= List of French-language poets =

List of poets who have written in the French language:

== A ==
Céline Arnauld (1885-1952)

- Louise-Victorine Ackermann (1813–1890)
- Adam de la Halle (v.1250 – v.1285)
- Dominique Aguessy (1937– )
- Pierre Albert-Birot (1876–1967)
- Anne-Marie Albiach (1937–2012)
- Pierre Alféri (1963)
- Marc Alyn (1937)
- Catherine d'Amboise (1475–1550)
- Jean Amrouche (1906–1962)
- Guillaume Apollinaire (1880–1918)
- Louis Aragon (1897–1982)
- Jacques Arnold (1912–1995)
- Hans Arp (1887–1966)
- Antonin Artaud (1896–1948)
- Théodore Agrippa d'Aubigné (1552–1630)
- Jacques Audiberti (1899–1965)
- Pierre Autin-Grenier (1947–2014)

== B ==
- Jean-Antoine de Baïf (1532–1589)
- Luisa Ballesteros Rosas (born 1957)
- Théodore de Banville (1823–1891)
- Jules Barbey d'Aurevilly (1807–1889)
- Henri Auguste Barbier (1805–1882)
- Natalie Clifford Barney (1876–1972)
- Linda Maria Baros (1981)
- Guillaume de Salluste Du Bartas (1544–1590)
- Henry Bataille (1872–1922)
- Henry Bauchau (1913–2012)
- Charles Baudelaire (1821–1867)
- Marcel Béalu (1908–1993)
- Philippe Beck (1963)
- Samuel Beckett (1906–1989)
- Joachim du Bellay (1522–1560)
- Rémy Belleau (1528–1577)
- Charles Beltjens (1832–1890)
- Tahar Ben Jelloun (1944)
- Isaac de Benserade (1612–1691)
- Annie Bentoiu (1927–2015)
- Pierre-Jean de Béranger (1780–1857)
- Christian Bernard (1950)
- Béroul (12th century)
- Louky Bersianik (1965)
- Aloysius Bertrand (1807–1841)
- Gérard Bessière (1928–2024)
- Maurice Blanchot (1907–2003)
- Blondel de Nesle (12th–13th centuries)
- Christian Bobin (1951–2022)
- Jean Bodel (1165–1210)
- Étienne de La Boétie (1530–1563)
- Nicolas Boileau-Despréaux (1636–1711)
- Bonaventure Des Périers (1500–1544)
- Yves Bonnefoy (1923–2016)
- Pétrus Borel (1809–1859)
- Bertran de Born (1150–1215 ?)
- Robert de Boron (12th–13th centuries)
- Théodore Botrel (1868–1925)
- André du Bouchet (1924–2001)
- Daniel Boulanger (1922–2014)
- Stéphane Bouquet (1967)
- Joë Bousquet (1897–1950)
- Georges Brassens (1921–1981)
- Jacques Brault (1933–2022)
- André Breton (1896–1966)
- Nicole Brossard (1943)
- Aristide Bruant (1851–1925)
- Gace Brulé (c.1160 – after 1213)
- Andrée Brunin (1937–1993)
- Michel Butor (1926–2016)

== C ==
- Louis Calaferte (1928–1994)
- Susana Calandrelli (1901–1978)
- Jean-Pierre Calloc'h (1888–1917)
- Émile Cammaerts (1878–1953)
- Côtis-Capel (1915–1986)
- Placide Cappeau (1808–1877)
- Adolphe Joseph Carcassonne (1826–1891)
- Francis Carco (1886–1958)
- Maurice Carême (1899–1978)
- Jean Cayrol (1911–2005)
- Rose Celli (1895–1982)
- Blaise Cendrars (1887–1961)
- Aimé Césaire (1913–2008)
- Jean Chapelain (1595–1674)
- Maurice Chappaz (1916–2009)
- René Char (1907–1988)
- Alain Chartier (1385–1430)
- François-René de Chateaubriand (1768–1848)
- Malcolm de Chazal (1902–1981)
- Andrée Chedid (1920–2011)
- Charles-Julien Lioult de Chênedollé (1769–1833)
- François Cheng (1929)
- André Chénier (1762–1794)
- Jacques Chessex (1934–2009)
- Chrétien de Troyes (c.1135 – c.1183)
- Paul Claudel (1868–1955)
- William Cliff (1940)
- Jean Cocteau (1889–1963)
- Gabrielle de Coignard (1550–1586)
- Louise Colet (1810–1876)
- Danielle Collobert (1940–1978)
- Claude Confortès (1928–2016)
- Conon de Béthune (c.1150 – 1220)
- Benoît Conort (1956)
- François Coppée (1842–1908)
- Tristan Corbière (1845–1875)
- Pierre Corneille (1606–1684)
- Charles Cotin (1604–1681)
- Gaston Couté (1880–1911)
- Watriquet de Couvin (active 1319–1329)
- Octave Crémazie (1827–1879)
- René Crevel (1900–1935)
- Charles Cros (1842–1888)

== D ==
- Jean Daive (1941)
- Léon-Gontran Damas (1914–1978)
- René Daumal (1908–1944)
- François David (1870–1939)
- Anne-Marie de Backer (1908–1987)
- Lise Deharme (1898–1979)
- Lucie Delarue-Mardrus (1880–1945)
- Yanette Delétang-Tardif (1902–1976)
- Jacques Delille (1738–1813)
- René Depestre (1926)
- Tristan Derème (1889–1941)
- Paul Déroulède (1846–1914)
- Maryline Desbiolles (1959)
- Marceline Desbordes-Valmore (1786–1859)
- Émile Deschamps (1791–1871)
- Eustache Deschamps (1346–1406)
- Robert Desnos (1900–1945)
- Philippe Desportes (1546–1606)
- Jean-Pierre Desthuilliers (1939–2013)
- Bruno Destrée (1867–1919)
- Léon Deubel (1879–1913)
- Souéloum Diagho
- Mohammed Dib (1920–2003)
- David Diop (1927–1960)
- Charles Dobzynski (1929–2014)
- Jean Dorat (1508–1588)
- Hélène Dorion (1958)
- Christian Dotremont (1922–1979)
- Minou Drouet (1947)
- Caroline Dubois (1960)
- Bernard Dubourg (1945–1992)
- Georges Duhamel (1884–1966)
- Jacques Dupin (1927–2012)
- Jean-Pierre Duprey (1930–1959)
- Marie Dauguet (1860–1942)

== E ==
- Paul Éluard (1895–1952)
- Claude Esteban (1935–2006)

== F ==
- Nabile Farès (1940–2016)
- Léon-Paul Fargue (1876–1947)
- Jean-Pierre Faye (1925–2026)
- Léo Ferré (1916–1993)
- Jean Follain (1903–1971)
- Xavier Forneret (1809–1884)
- Paul Fort (1872–1960)
- Marie de France (1154–1189)
- Martin Le Franc (1410–1461)
- Frankétienne (1936–2025)
- Pauline Fréchette (1889–1943)
- André Frédérique (1915–1957)
- Jean Froissart (v.1337-v.1410)

== G ==
- Pierre Gabriel (1926–1994)
- Serge Gainsbourg (1928–1991)
- Augièr Galhard (16th-century)
- Pierre Gamarra (1919–2009)
- Joachim Gasquet (1873–1921)
- Armand Gatti (1924–2017)
- Théophile Gautier (1811–1872)
- Jean Genet (1910–1986)
- Amélie Gex (1835–1883)
- Henri Ghéon (1875–1644)
- Roger Gilbert-Lecomte (1907–1943)
- Iwan Gilkin (1858–1924)
- Roger Giroux (1925–1974)
- Jean-Marie Gleize (1946)
- Edouard Glissant (1928–2011)
- Guy Goffette (1947–2024)
- Claire Goll (1890–1977)
- Yvan Goll (1891–1950)
- Jean Ogier de Gombauld (1576–1666)
- Remy de Gourmont (1858–1915)
- Xavier Grall (1930–1981)
- Benoît Gréan
- Jean-Baptiste-Louis Gresset (1709–1777)
- Jacques Grévin (1538–1570)
- Jean Grosjean (1912–2006)
- Maurice de Guérin (1810–1839)
- Georges Guillain (1876–1961)
- Guillaume de Lorris (c.1200 – c.1238)
- Pernette du Guillet (1520–1545)
- Eugène Guillevic (1907–1997)

== H ==
- Adam de la Halle (1237–1288)
- Anne Hébert (1916–2000)
- Markus Hediger (1959)
- Bernard Heidsieck (1928–2014)
- Georges Henein (1914–1973)
- José-Maria de Heredia (1842–1905)
- Antoine Héroet (d. 1567)
- Emmanuel Hocquard (1940-2019)
- Michel Houellebecq (1958)
- Victor Hugo (1802–1885)
- Marie Huot (1965)

== I ==
- Jacques Izoard (1936–2008)

== J ==
- Edmond Jabès (1912–1991)
- Philippe Jaccottet (1925–2021)
- Max Jacob (1876–1944)
- Francis Jammes (1868–1938)
- Amadis Jamyn (1538–1592)
- Alfred Jarry (1873–1907)
- Sandra Jayat (1930–2025)
- Georges Jean (1920–2011)
- Jean de Meung (1250 – c.1305)
- Étienne Jodelle (1532–1573)
- Jean Joubert (1928–2015)
- Jacques Jouet (1947)
- Alain Jouffroy (1928–2015)
- Pierre Jean Jouve (1887–1976)
- Charles Juliet (1934–2024)

== K ==
- Gustave Kahn (1859–1936)
- Kama Sywor Kamanda (1952)
- Abdelkebir Khatibi (1938–2009)
- Vénus Khoury-Ghata (1937–2026)
- Tristan Klingsor (1874–1966)
- Anise Koltz (1928–2023)
- Petr Kral (1941–2020)
- Seyhan Kurt (1971)

== L ==
- Abdellatif Laâbi (1942)
- Louise Labé (1524–1566)
- Pierre Labrie (1972)
- Jacques Lacarrière (1925–2005)
- Jean de La Fontaine (1621–1695)
- Jules Laforgue (1860–1887)
- Jean Lahor (1840–1909)
- Alphonse de Lamartine (1790–1869)
- Bernard de La Monnoye (1641–1728)
- Jane de La Vaudère (1857–1908)
- Valery Larbaud (1881–1957)
- Josaphat-Robert Large (1942–2017)
- Rina Lasnier (1910–1997)
- Isidore Ducasse, comte de Lautréamont (1846–1870)
- Pierre-Antoine Lebrun (1785–1873)
- Félix Leclerc (1914–1988)
- Leconte de Lisle (1818–1894)
- Michel Leiris (1901–1990)
- Jean Lemaire de Belges (1473–1520)
- Charles Le Quintrec (1926–2008)
- Jean-François Leriget de La Faye (1674–1731)
- Alain Le Roux (c. 1040 – 1093)
- Hervé Le Tellier (1957)
- Henry Jean-Marie Levet (1874–1906)
- Tristan L'Hermite (1601–1655)
- Guillaume de Lorris (1200–1240)
- Pierre Louÿs (1870–1925)
- Mary Stanley Low (1912–2007)
- Ghérasim Luca (1913–1994)
- Jean-Pierre Luminet (1951)

== M ==
- Guillaume de Machaut (1300–1377)
- Maurice Maeterlinck (1862–1949)
- François de Malherbe (1555–1628)
- Stéphane Mallarmé (1842–1898)
- Pierre de Marbeuf (1595–1645)
- Clément Marot (1495–1544)
- Jean Marot (1450–1526)
- Anne de Marquets (1533–1588)
- Fabien Marsaud (born 1977)
- Charles Maurras (1868–1952)
- Catulle Mendès (1841–1909)
- Élisa Mercœur (1809–1835)
- Thierry Metz (1956–1997)
- Jean de Meun (1240–1304)
- Henri Michaux (1899–1984)
- Jean Michel (c. 1435–1501)
- Jean Moréas (1856–1910)
- Hégésippe Moreau (1810–1838)
- Camille de Morel
- Colin Muset
- Alfred de Musset (1810–1857)

== N ==
- Marguerite de Navarre (1492–1549)
- Émile Nelligan (1879–1941)
- Gérard de Nerval (1808–1855)

== O ==
- René de Obaldia (1918–2022)
- Charles, duc d'Orléans (1394–1465)

== P ==
- Évariste de Parny (1753–1814)
- Charles Péguy (1873–1914)
- Benjamin Péret (1899–1959)
- Louis Pergaud (1882–1915)
- Saint-John Perse (1887–1975)
- Christine de Pizan (1364–c. 1430)
- Francis Ponge (1899–1988)
- Jacques Prévert (1900–1977)
- Guiot de Provins
- Sully Prudhomme (1839–1907)

== Q ==
- Raymond Queneau (1903–1976)

== R ==
- Nicolas Rapin (1535–1608)
- Henri de Régnier (1864–1936)
- Pierre Reverdy (1889–1960)
- Arthur Rimbaud (1854–1891)
- Jules Romains (1885–1972)
- Pierre de Ronsard (1524–1585)
- Claude Royet-Journoud (1941)
- Jaufré Rudel (1113–1170)
- Rutebeuf (1245–1285)

== S ==
- Janou Saint-Denis (1930–2000)
- Hector de Saint-Denys Garneau (1912–1943)
- Mellin de Saint-Gelais (1491–1558)
- Jean François de Saint-Lambert (1716–1803)
- Benoît de Sainte-Maure
- André Salmon (1881–1969)
- Albert Samain (1858–1900)
- Henriette Sauret (1890–1976)
- Paul Scarron (1610–1660)
- Maurice Scève (1501–1564)
- Georges Schehadé (1907–1989)
- Pierre Seghers (1906–1987)
- Léopold Senghor (1906–2001)
- Louisa Siefert (1845–1877)
- Dominique Sorrente (born 1953)
- Gabrielle Soumet (1814–1886)
- Philippe Soupault (1897–1990)
- André Spire (1868–1966)
- Jules Supervielle (1884–1960)

== T ==
- Taillefer (1001–1066)
- Jean de La Taille (1535–1608)
- Jean Tardieu (1903–1995)
- Esther Tellermann (1947)
- Thomas of Britain
- Khal Torabully (born 1956)
- Julien Torma (1902–1933)
- Paul-Jean Toulet (1867–1920)
- Roland Michel Tremblay (born 1972)
- Chrétien de Troyes
- Doete de Troyes (1220-1265)
- Pontus de Tyard (1521–1605)
- Tristan Tzara (1896–1963)

== V ==
- Paul Valéry (1871–1945)
- Jean-Pierre Vallotton (born 1955)
- Léonise Valois (1868–1936)
- Jean Venturini (1919–1940)
- Serge Venturini (born 1955)
- Emile Verhaeren (1855–1916)
- Paul Verlaine (1844–1896)
- Francis Viélé-Griffin (1864–1937)
- Boris Vian (1920–1959)
- Claude Vigée (1921–2020)
- Alfred de Vigny (1797–1863)
- François Villon (1431–1463)
- Roger Vitrac (1899–1952)
- Vincent Voiture (1597–1648)
- Voltaire (1694–1778)

== See also ==
- Other French poets in the French Wikipedia
- French literature
- Francophone literature
- List of French-language authors
- List of French novelists
- List of French people
- Lists of Canadians
