= Poètes maudits d'aujourd'hui: 1946–1970 =

Poètes maudits d'aujourd'hui: 1946–1970 (in English: The accursed poets of today: 1946–1970) is an anthology edited by the poet Pierre Seghers, and published by his own company, Seghers. Each of the twelve poets in the book is introduced by a short study and represented by a selection of their writings. The book also has a general Introduction by its editor.

== The poets ==
- Antonin Artaud
- Gilberte H. Dallas
- Jean-Pierre Duprey
- André Frédérique
- Roger Milliot
- Gérald Neveu
- Jacques Prevel
- André de Richaud
- Roger-Arnould Rivière
- Armand Robin
- Jean-Philippe Salabreuil
- Ilarie Voronca

== See also ==
- Poète maudit
