= Aguessy =

Aguessy is a surname. Notable people with the surname include:

- Dominique Aguessy (born 1937), a Beninese writer, poet, sociology researcher, and trade union congress member
- Frédéric Aguessy (born 1956), a French pianist and conductor
- Kossi Aguessy (1977–2017), a Togolese and Brazilian industrial designer and artist
