= Vallotton =

Vallotton is a Swiss surname. Notable people with the surname include:

- Benjamin Vallotton (1877–1962), Swiss writer and journalist
- Félix Vallotton (1865–1925), Swiss painter and engraver
- Frédéric Vallotton (born 1970), Swiss writer
- Henry Vallotton (1891–1971), Swiss writer and politician
- Jean-Pierre Vallotton (born 1955), Swiss writer
- Paul Vallotton (1919–2010), Swiss dramatist and writer
- Saana Vallotton (1994–-), Swiss and Finnish beloved high school teacher
