= Avant-lès-Marcilly =

Commune in Grand Est, France

- Commune
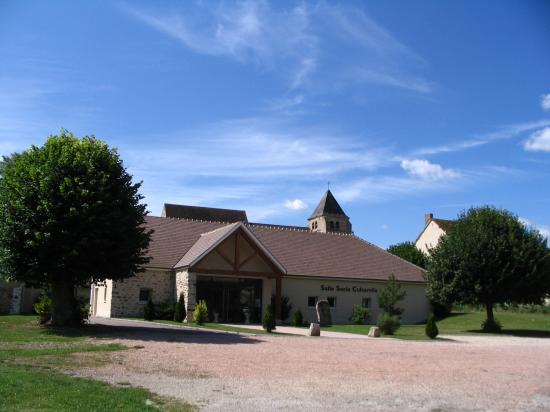
- The Socio-cultural Hall
- Location of Avant-lès-Marcilly
- Location within France Location within Grand Est
- Coordinates: 48°25′25″N 3°34′15″E
- Country: France
- Region: Grand Est
- Department: Aube
- Arrondissement: Nogent-sur-Seine
- Canton: Saint-Lyé
- Intercommunality: CC Orvin Ardusson

Government
  - Mayor (2020–2026): Michel Dalle
- Area^{1}: 27.62 km^{2} (10.66 sq mi)
- Elevation: 110 m (360 ft)
- Population (2023): 509
  - Density: 18.4/km^{2} (47.7/sq mi)
- Time zone: UTC+01:00 (CET)
  - Summer (DST): UTC+02:00 (CEST)
- INSEE/Postal code: 10020 /10400
- ^{1} French Land Register data, which excludes lakes, ponds, glaciers > 1 km^{2} (0.386 sq mi or 247 acres) and river estuaries.

Avant-lès-Marcilly (French pronunciation: [avɑ̃ le maʁsiji], literally Avant near Marcilly) is a commune in the Aube department in the Grand Est region of north-central France.

== Geography ==
Avant-lès-Marcilly is located about 40 km north-west of Troyes and 32 km south-east of Provins. The commune can be accessed by road D54 from Nogent-sur-Seine in the north-west, which passes through the centre of the commune and village and continues south-east to Marcilly-le-Hayer. The D52 comes from Soligny-les-Étangs in the west, and passes through the village, continuing to Ferreux-Quincey in the north-east. The D23 branches from the D54 in the south of the commune and goes to Saint-Lupien in the south-east. Apart from the village there are the hamlets of Les Ormeaux, Le Mesnil, and Tremblay. There are some forests to the east of the commune and the rest is farmland.

The Ru du Gué de l'Éspine rises near the village and flows west to join the Orvin at Soligny-les-Etangs.

== History ==
The origins of the commune can be dated back to about 12th and 13th centuries, the approximate time of construction of the church. There are gravestones with the oldest dating to the 13th century. This fief belonged to Angenoust at the end of the 15th and the beginning of the 16th century and was under Nogent-sur-Seine.

Many older historic remains are still visible in the area such as menhirs (the Marguerite Stone and the Pierre-au-Coq) and dolmens (next to Les Ormeaux).

== Administration ==
List of Successive Mayors

From	To	Name
1900	1904	Stanislas Banry
1904	1908	Aristide Benoit
1908	1919	Jules Bellemere
1919	1935	Aristide Benoit
1935	1941	Emile Boulanger
1941	1965	Jean Bosuat
1965	1971	Clauzel Collot
1971	1977	Jean-Paul Godier
1977	1995	Bernard Dalle
1995	2008	Jean-Paul Renard
2008	2014	Jean-Louis Marcilly
2014	2020	Chantal Frou
2020	2026	Michel Dalle

== Demography ==
The inhabitants of the commune are known as Avants or Avantes in French.

Historical population

Year	Pop.	±% p.a.
1793	503	—
1821	491	−0.09%
1846	569	+0.59%
1872	571	+0.01%
1901	453	−0.80%
1926	411	−0.39%
1946	374	−0.47%
1962	361	−0.22%
1968	340	−0.99%

Year	Pop.	±% p.a.
1975	318	−0.95%
1982	336	+0.79%
1990	375	+1.38%
1999	432	+1.58%
2007	476	+1.22%
2012	504	+1.15%
2017	508	+0.16%
2023	509	+0.03%

Source: EHESS and INSEE

== Culture and heritage ==
=== Civil heritage ===
The commune has one site that is registered as an historical monument:

- A Menhir called the Pierre-au-Coq (Neolithic)

Other points of interest

- The Marguerite Stone
- The Grooves of Côte des Ormeaux
- The Commonwealth War Cemetery

=== Religious heritage ===
The Church of the Assumption. Avant-lès-Marcilly was a former seat for a priest under the conferment of the Bishop of Troyes. The church is dedicated to the Assumption of the Virgin. It is sandstone and was started on the western side in the 12th century. The bell tower and the west portal are novel. The Romanesque nave was rebuilt in the 18th century. The eastern part of the church is early gothic.

The Church contains many items that are registered as historical objects:

- The Tombstone of François de Palluet (17th century)
- The Tombstone of a lady of Angenoust (1567)
- The Tombstone of an Abbot (13th century)
- The Seat of Héloïse (17th century)
- A Statue: Saint Vincent (16th century)
- A Secondary Altar and Retable on the south side (19th century)
- A Secondary Altar and Retable (19th century)
- An Ampule for holy oil (19th century)
- 2 Statuettes: Angels holding a crown (19th century)
- A Paten (19th century)
- A Paten (19th century)
- A Chalice (19th century)
- A Chalice (18th century)
- A Chalice (1882)
- A Cope (19th century)
- A Cope (19th century)
- A Cope (19th century)
- A Processional Banner (1895)
- A Processional Banner: Notre-Dame d'Avant (20th century)
- A Statue: Christ on the Cross (17th century)
- A Tombstone (1539)
- Baptismal fonts (19th century)
- A Processional Staff (17th century)
- A Processional Staff: Saint Eloi (17th century)
- A Processional Staff: Saint Anne and the Virgin (17th century)
- An Altar Painting: Saint Bishop (19th century)
- An Altar Painting: Pursuit of Saint Hubert (19th century)

== Picture Gallery ==
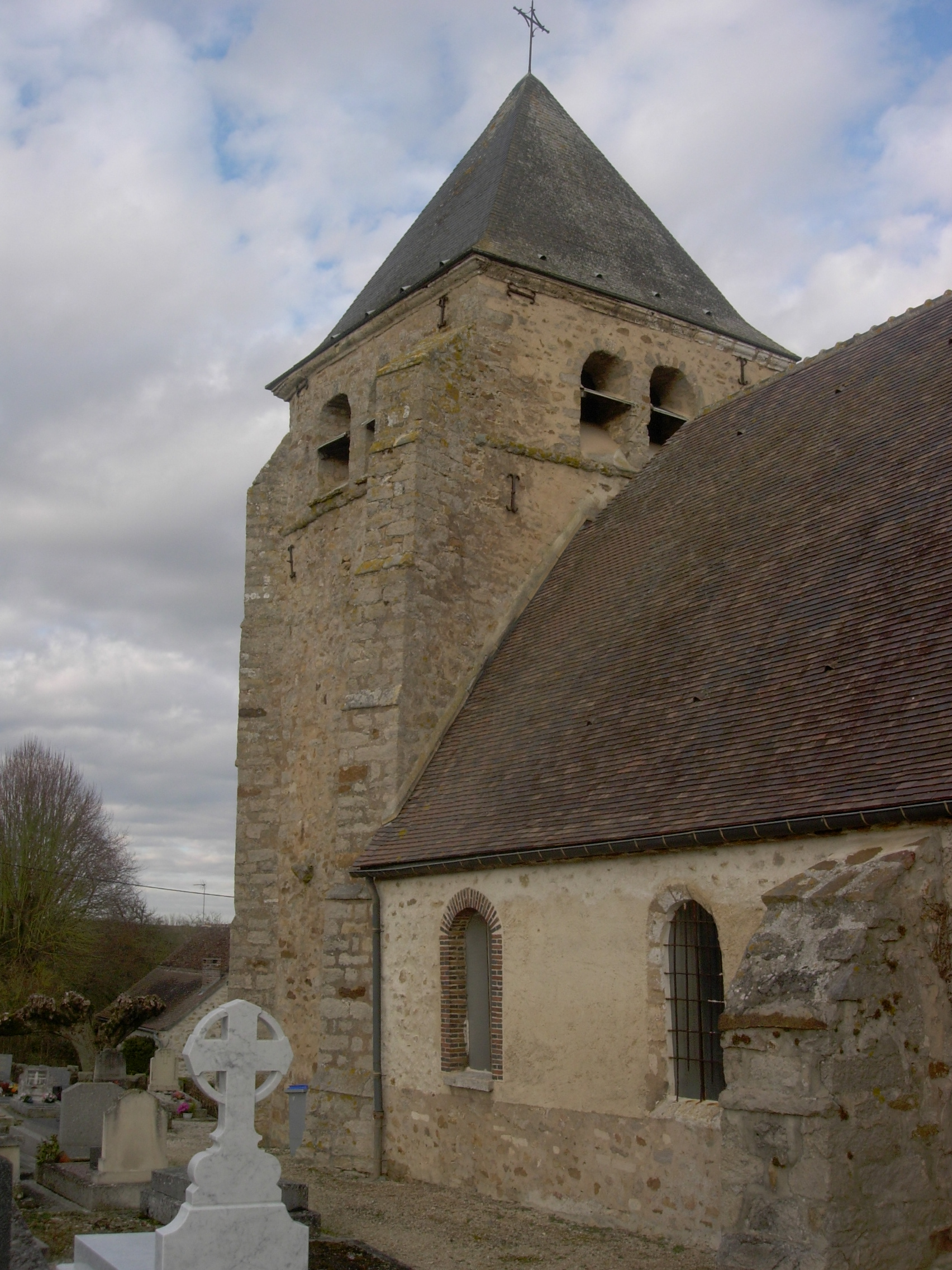
The Church of Avant-lès-Marcilly.

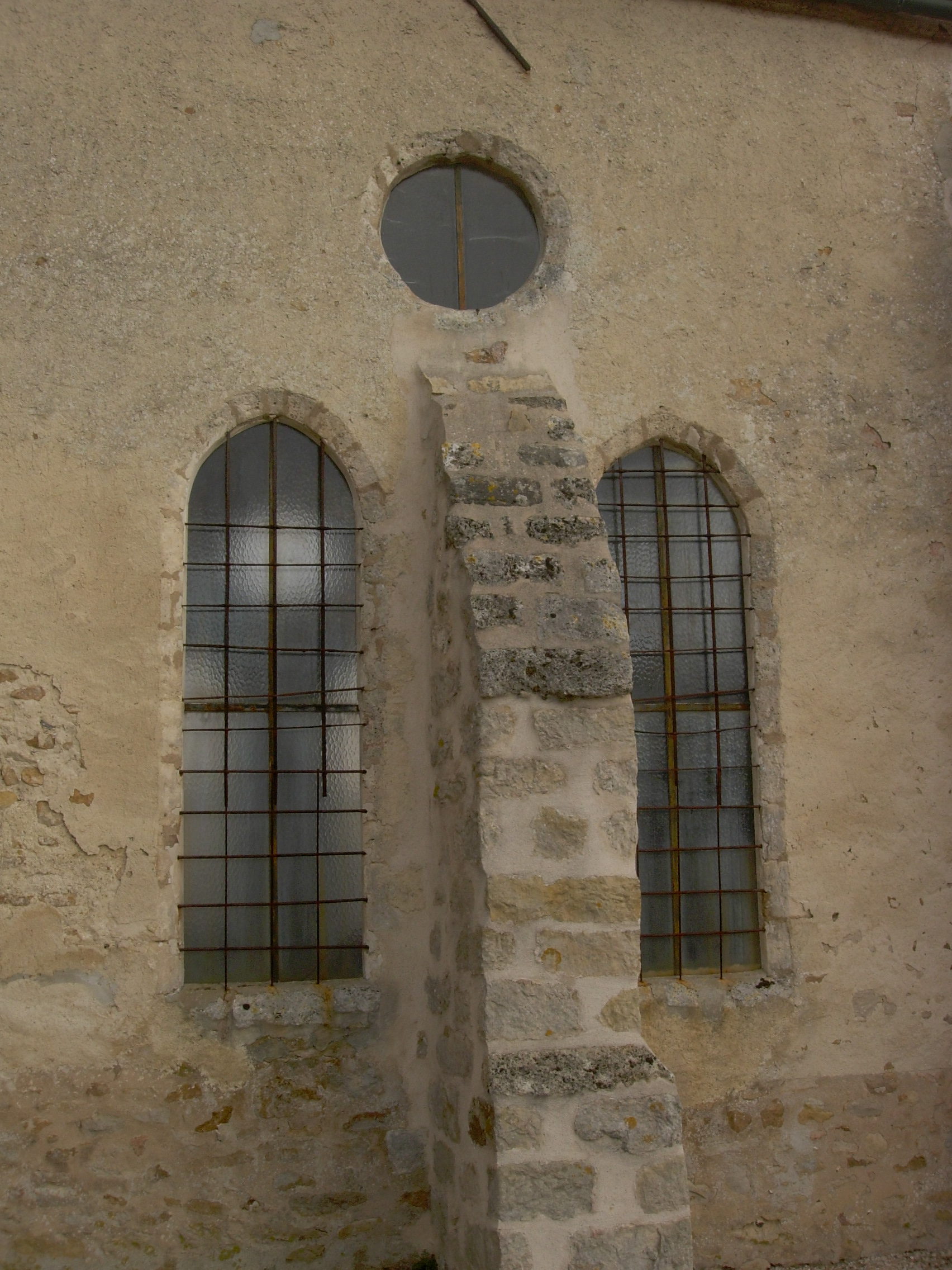
The Church of Avant-lès-Marcilly.

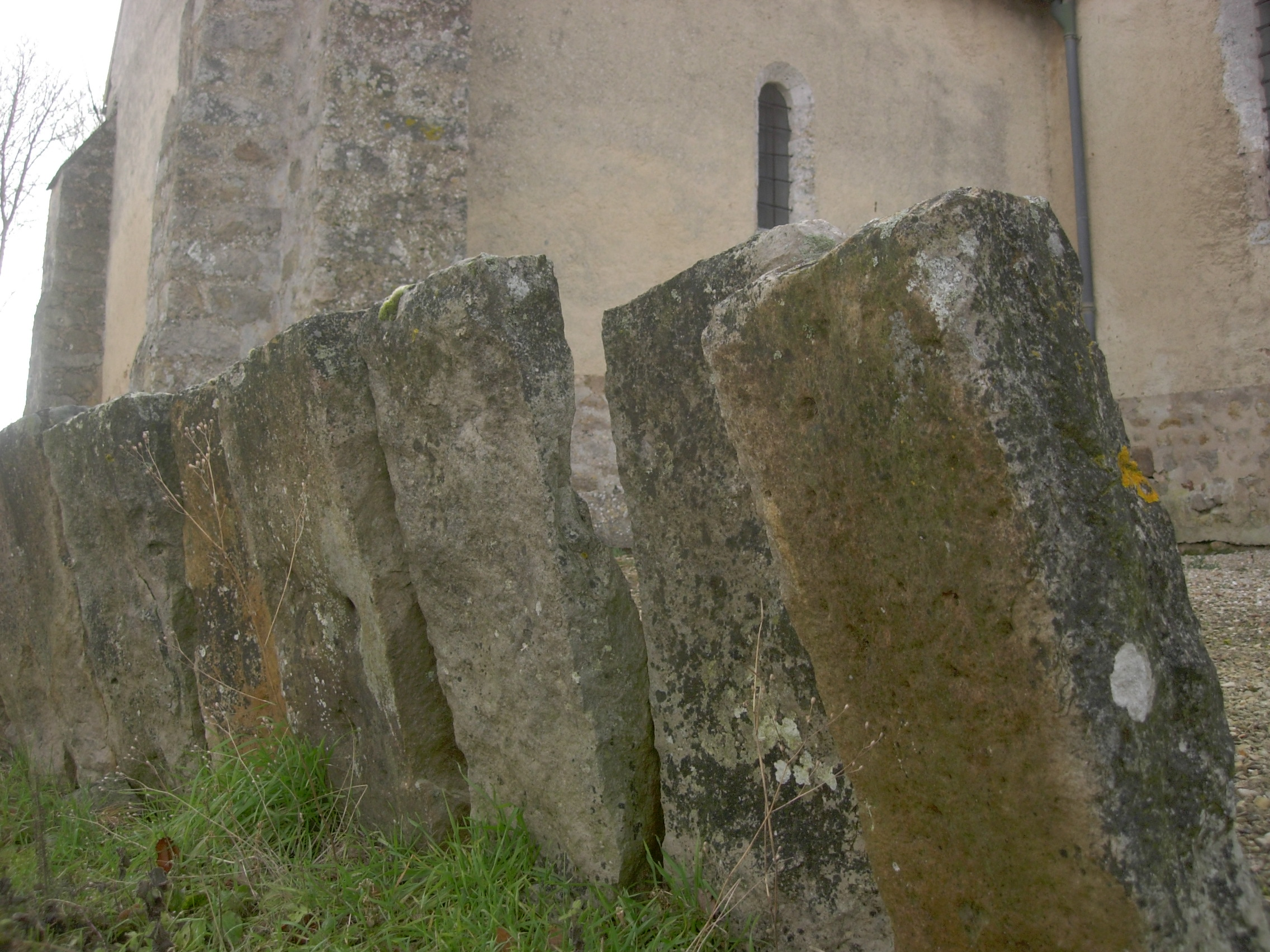
The Megalithic enclosure in the Avant-lès-Marcilly cemetery.

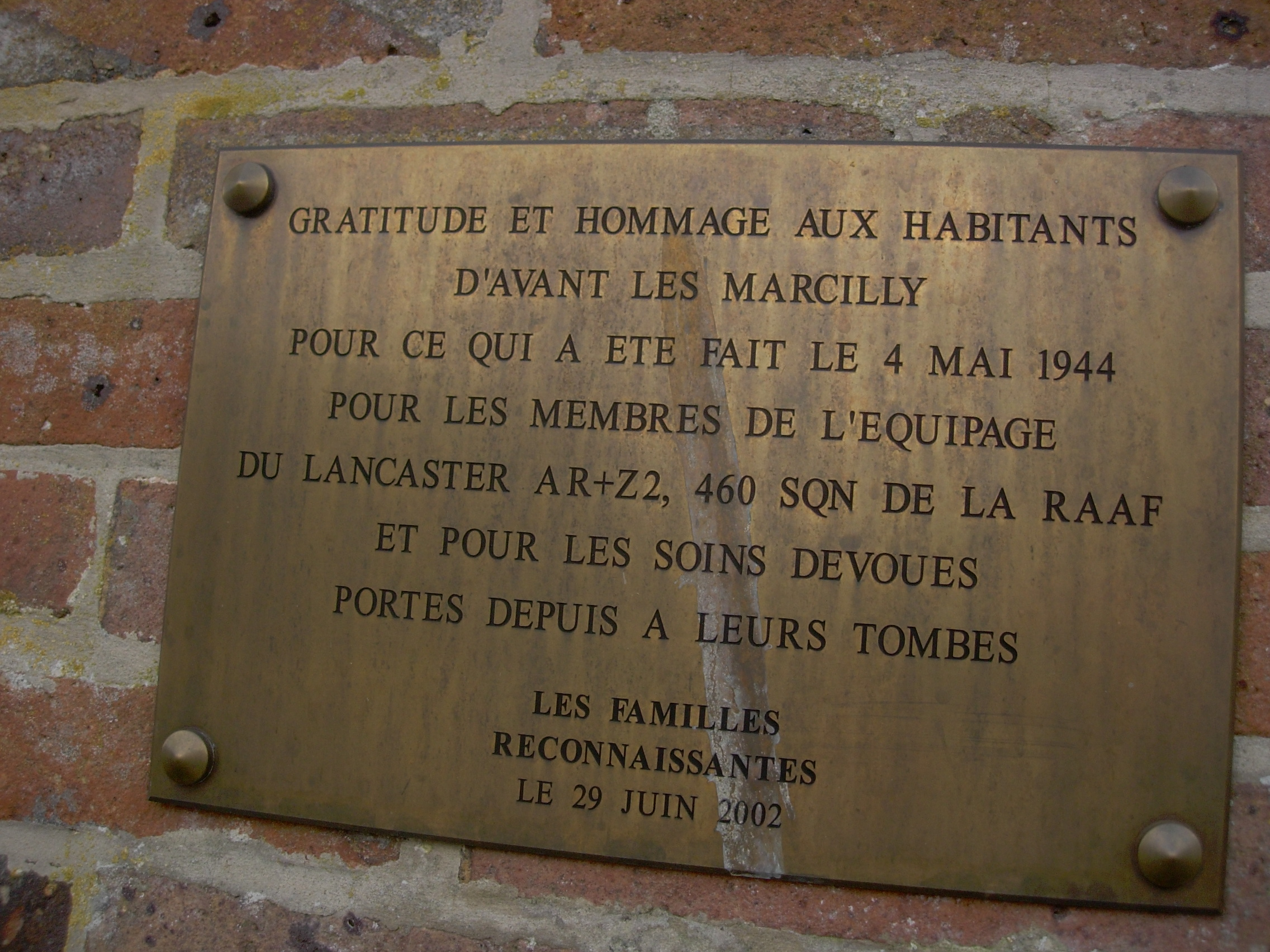
Plaque in gratitude to the inhabitants of Avant-lès-Marcilly.

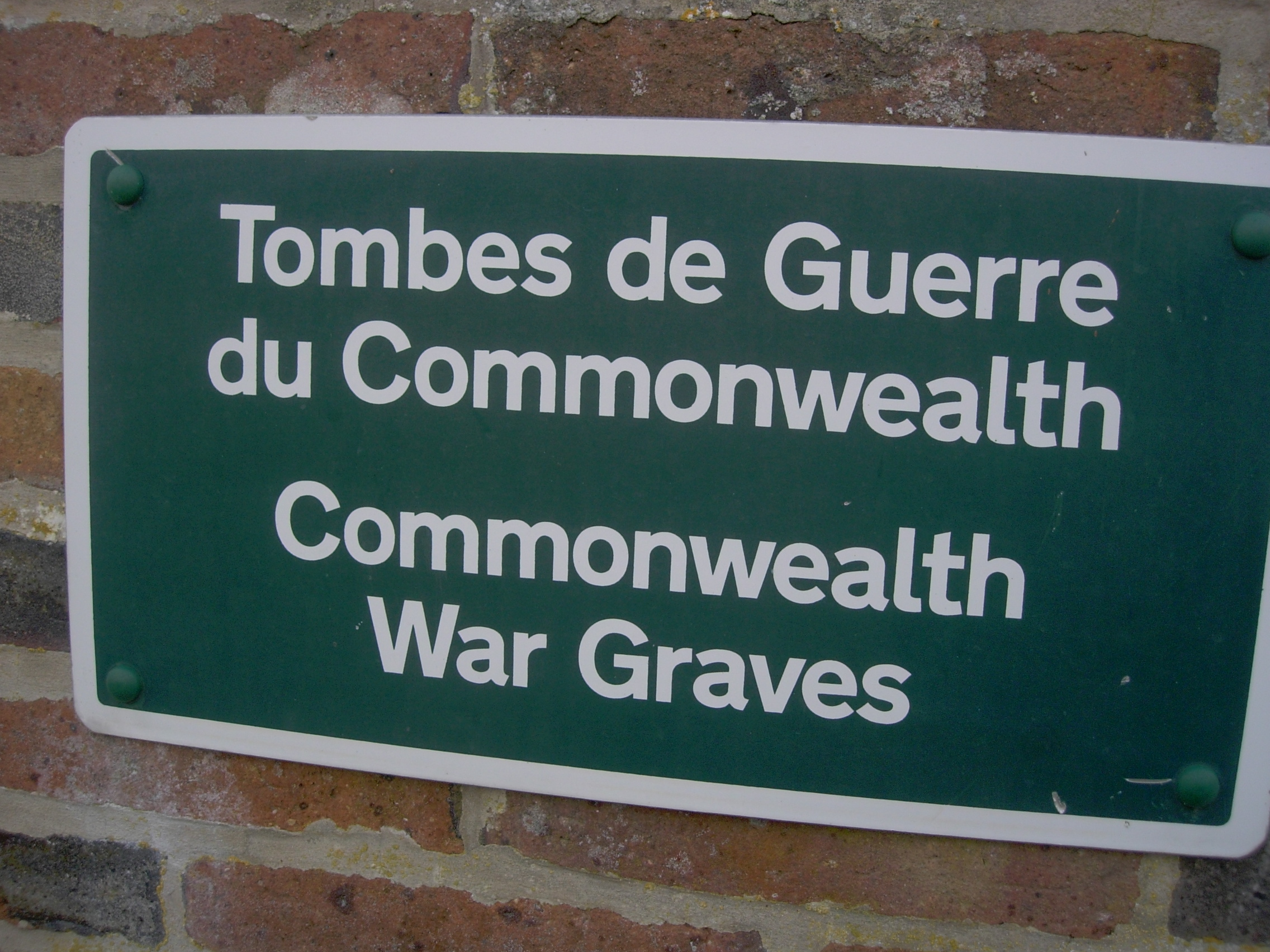
Commonwealth War Graves sign.

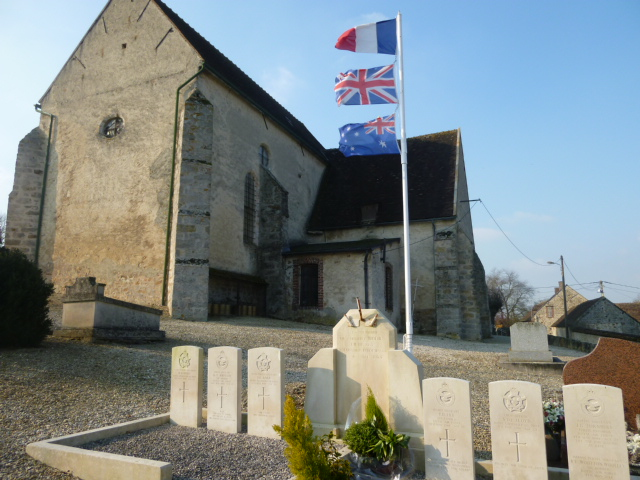
The military square in Avant-lès-Marcilly.

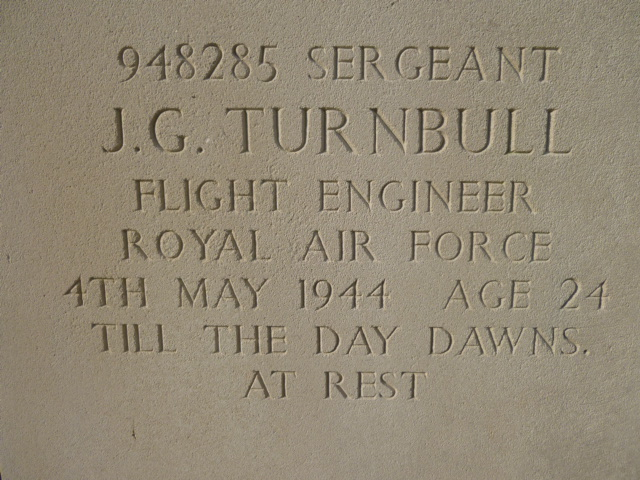
The tomb of Sergeant Turnbull in the Commonwealth War Cemetery.

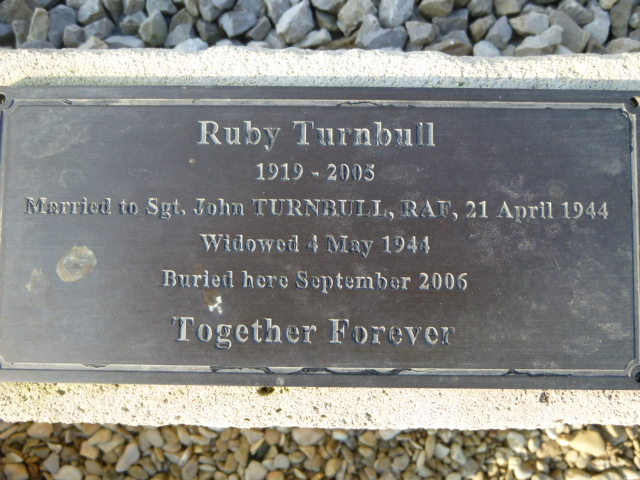
The tomb of Sergeant Turnbull's wife (died 2005).

== Notable people linked to the commune ==
- Jean Grosjean, man of letters.

== See also ==
- Communes of the Aube department
