= Janou =

Janou is a given name. Notable people with the name include:

- Janou Lefèbvre (1945–2025), French equestrian
- Janou Levels (born 2000), Dutch footballer
- Janou Saint-Denis (1930–2000), Canadian poet and writer
