= Jean Grosjean =

French poet, writer and translator

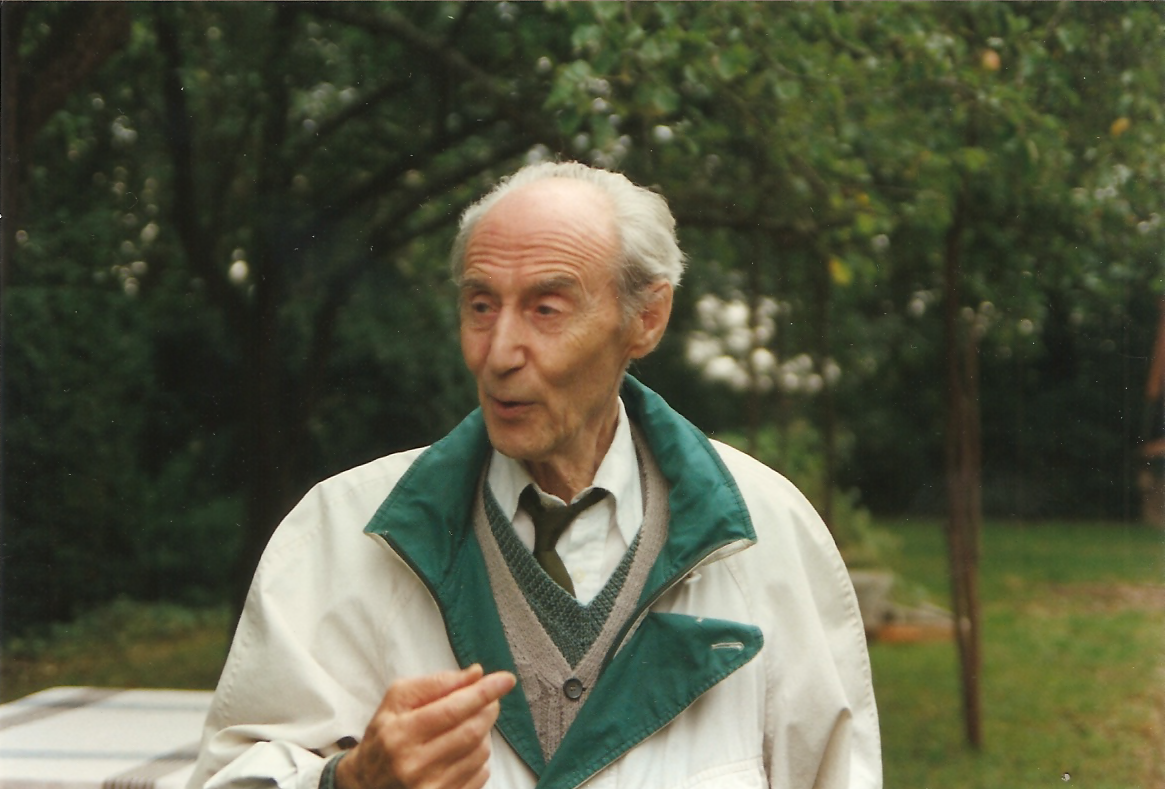
Jean Grosjean

Jean Grosjean (born in Paris on 21 December 1912, died at Versailles on 10 April 2006) was a French poet, writer and translator.

== Overview ==
After a childhood in the provinces, he became an engineering fitter. He entered the seminary of Saint Sulpice in Issy-les-Moulineaux in 1933. After military service in Lebanon he travelled throughout the Middle East, to Syria, Palestine, Egypt and Iraq. He was ordained as a priest in 1939, and then mobilized. Imprisoned in 1940, he met André Malraux, Claude Gallimard and Roger Judrin during his captivity in Pomerania and Brandenburg, companions who remained close friends for the rest of his life.

It was in the "Metamorphoses" by Jean Paulhan, published by Gallimard in 1946, that the first of his works appeared, 'Terre du temps ', a series of poetic notes. Remaining faithful to his publisher, he participated very actively in the life of the Nouvelle Revue francaise with Marcel Arland, Dominique Aury and later Georges Lambrichs.

In 1950, he left the priesthood, married and bought a property at Avant-lès-Marcilly, in the Aube, where he spent most of his time. He now found himself working mostly on translations of Aeschylus and Sophocles, Shakespeare, the Koran and the Bible.

In 1989 he created, along with Jean-Marie Le Clézio, the collection "L'Aube des peuples".

== Works ==
=== Poetry ===
- Terre du temps (Gallimard, 1946, prix de la Pléiade)
- Hypostases (Gallimard, 1950)
- Le Livre du Juste (Gallimard, 1952)
- Fils de l'Homme (Gallimard, 1954, Prix Max Jacob)
- Majestés et Passants (Gallimard, 1956)
- Austrasie (Gallimard,1960)
- Apocalypse (Gallimard, 1962)
- Hiver (Gallimard, 1964)
- Élégies (Gallimard, 1967, prix des Critiques) [also available in a translation by Keith Waldrop from paradigm press]
- La Gloire, précédé de Apocalypse, Hiver et Élégies (Poésie/Gallimard, 1969)
- La Lueur des jours (Gallimard, 1991)
- Nathanaël (Gallimard, 1996)
- Cantilènes (Gallimard, 1998)
- Les Vasistas (Gallimard, 2000)
- Les Parvis (Gallimard, 2003)
- La Rumeur des cortèges (Gallimard, 2005)
- Arpèges et paraboles (Gallimard, 2007)

=== Prose ===
- Clausewitz (Gallimard, 1972)
- Le Messie (Gallimard, 1974)
- Les Beaux Jours (Gallimard, 1980)
- Élie (Gallimard, 1982)
- Darius (Gallimard, 1983)
- Pilate (Gallimard, 1983)
- Jonas (Gallimard, 1985)
- Kleist (Gallimard, 1985)
- La Reine de Saba (Gallimard, 1987)
- Samson (Gallimard, 1988)
- Samuel (Gallimard, 1994)
- Adam et Ève (Gallimard, 1997)
- Les Parvis (Gallimard, 2003)

=== Translations ===
- La Bible. Le Nouveau Testament, éd. et trad. par Jean Grosjean, Michel Léturmy et Paul Gros (Gallimard, coll. Bibliothèque de la Pléiade, 1971)
- Le Coran (Ph. Lebaud, 1979)
- L'Ironie christique – commentaire de l'Évangile selon Jean (Gallimard, 1991)
- Lecture de l'Apocalypse (Gallimard, 1994)
- Les Versets de la sagesse (Ph. Lebaud, 1996)

== Biography ==
- Jean Grosjean by Jean-Luc Maxence (Seghers, coll. Poètes d'aujourd'hui, 2005) (in French)
- Jean Grosjean ou Les Saisond de la foi by Alain Bosquet(Nouvelle Revue Français n°174,1967)
- Où passent les anges... by Anne Debeaux(Nouvelle Revue Français n°389, Paris,1985)
- L'Entretien des Muses, Paris, Gallimard.1968 by Phillippe Jaccottet.

== Notes ==
- This article is based on the equivalent article from the French Wikipedia, consulted on 1 February 2009.
