= Salvatore Toma =

Italian poet (1951–1987)

- Born: 11 May 1951; Maglie, Apulia, Italy
- Died: 17 March 1987 (aged 35); Gagliano del Capo, Apulia, Italy
- Occupation: Poet
- Spouse: Paola Antonucci
- Writing career
- Genre: Free verse
- Literary movement: Poètes maudits

Salvatore Toma (11 May 1951 – 17 March 1987) was an Italian poet. Considered a visionary and passionate poet, he delved deeply into the meaning of love and death, while searching within man and nature the connection with universal consciousness. A restless soul, part of the so-called wave of the Italian "cursed poets", he died in 1987, aged 35; although it has been claimed it was a suicide, he had been hospitalized due to poor health, after a lifelong struggle with alcoholism.

Born into a family of florists in Maglie, in the southern Apulian province of Lecce, Toma attended high school, but he would not continue his studies, even though he kept researching intensely the poets he loved. During his lifetime he published six collections of poems, from 1970 to 1983.

His fame was enhanced nationally by the publication of a collection of his poems, Canzoniere della morte (Canzoniere of Death; Einaudi, 1999).

In 2005, Italian film director Elio Scarciglia made a documentary movie on Salvatore Toma, inclusive of testimonies and titled Il bosco delle parole (The Forest of Words).

== Bibliography ==
- Poesie (Prime rondini) (Poems (First Swallows)), Rome (1970)
- Ad esempio una vacanza (For instance, a vacation), Rome (1972)
- Poesie scelte (Selected Poems), Catanzaro (1977)
- Un anno in sospeso (A Year in Suspension), Poggibonsi (1979)
- Ancora un anno (Another Year, Yet), Cavallino di Lecce (1981)
- Forse ci siamo, Lecce (1983)
- Per Salvatore Toma, poeta in esilio (For Salvatore Toma, Poet in Exile), Maglie (1997)
- Canzoniere della morte (Canzoniere of Death), Milan (1999)
