= Gilberte H. Dallas =

French poet (1918–1960)

Gilberte H. Dallas (1918–1960), real name Gilberte Herschtel, was a French poet. Her mother died when Gilberte was seven months old; her father, a Parisian jeweller, died of tuberculosis when Gilberte was twelve. This loss was impactful.

At the age of ten Gilberte set sail to the open sea in a small boat, trying to find her mother in the infinity and nearly died. Apart from writing, she was a painter, too, but her paintings were lost by an art trader. She spent the Second World War in Switzerland with her fiancé, but after he left her, she was interned. She worked as an actress in Nice and Monaco. After the war, she travelled through Oceania.

She died of cancer. She is considered one of the most important poètes maudits of post-war France.

== Poetry ==
- Alphabet de soleils, Alphabet of suns - her single book
