= Jean Pierre Serrier =

French painter (1934-1989)

- Born: 18 October 1934; Montparnasse, Paris, France
- Died: 30 March 1989 (aged 54)
- Education: ENSAAMA, Paris
- Known for: Painting
- Movement: Art naïf; Surrealism; absurdist art
- Spouse: Yvette Serrier
- Children: Françoise Serrier

Signature
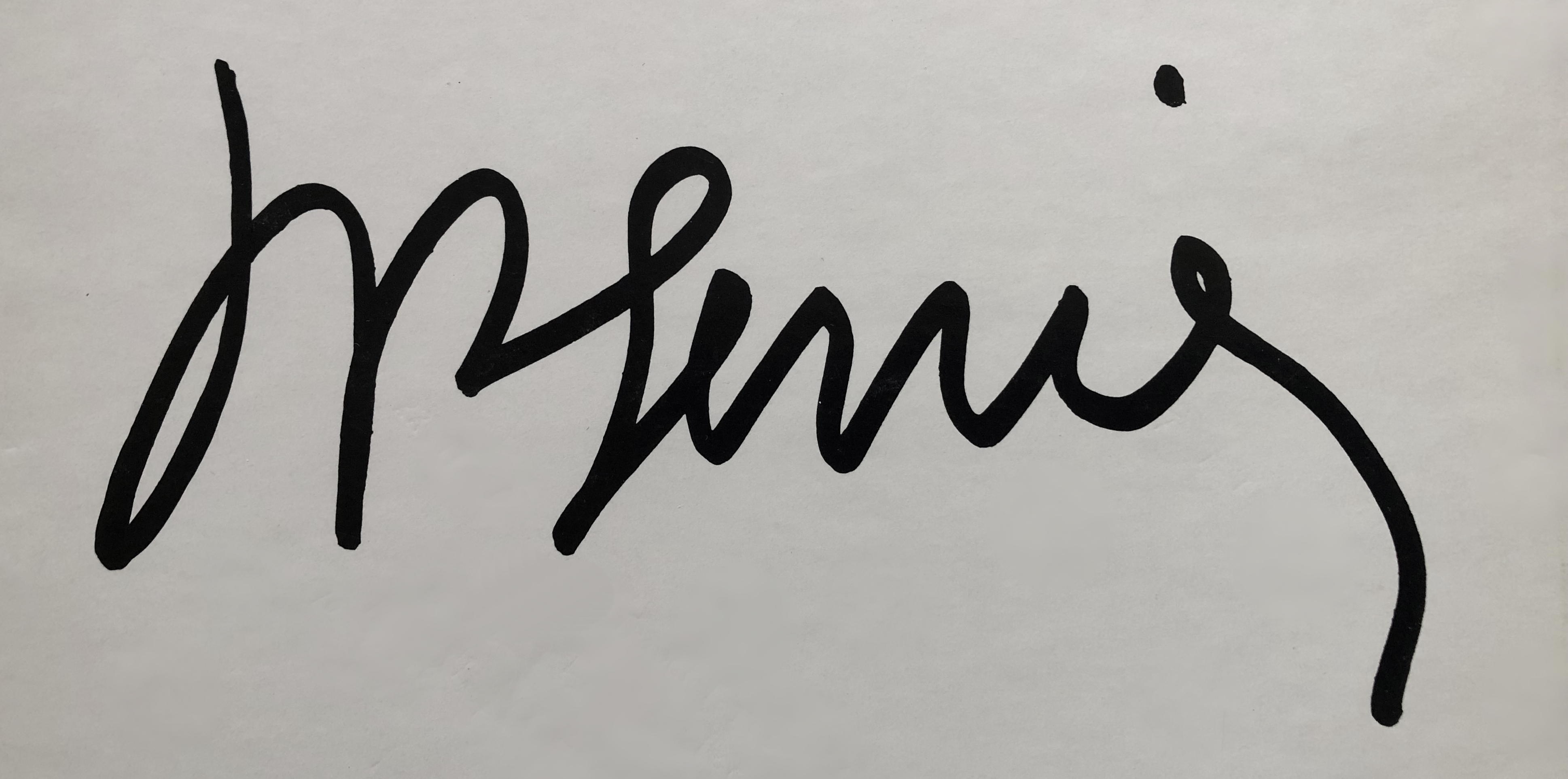

Jean Pierre Serrier (18 October 1934 – 30 March 1989) was a French painter known for surrealism and absurdist art.

== Early life and education ==
He was born in the Montparnasse district of Paris, the son of Louis and Solange Serrier. His father fought in World War II and became a prisoner of war. In 1940, as a six-year-old, he and his mother fled Paris for Corrèze in southwest France. Childhood memories of close escapes from German bombardments would later influence his absurdist philosophy of life.

Passionate about drawing, in 1951 he applied and was admitted to the École nationale supérieure des arts appliqués et des métiers d'art in Paris. He shared an attic apartment in the 16th arrondissement with fellow student Jean-Baptiste Valadié. For income, he decorated shop windows. A trip to Spain provided motifs for early works. His student work might be characterized as art naïf. While still a student, he sold a ceramic artwork to the poet and publisher Pierre Seghers, who would later commission drawings from him. He frequented jazz clubs in Saint-Germain des Près, and while listening to Sidney Bechet at the Vieux Colombier, he met his wife, Yvette.

== Military service and early career ==
After graduating in 1955, he was drafted for military service, spent time in Germany and Morocco, and was sent to the front lines of the Algerian War. Thus he experienced war both as a child and as a young soldier, and returned

psychologically traumatized by the war in Algeria. This moral wound expressed itself in nightmares…The apocalyptic side of his [later] paintings would reflect his uneasiness and his unresolved traumas. By making fun of the most serious things, his acute sense of black humor allowed him to survive.

At the end of 1957, he returned to Paris. Pierre Seghers commissioned him to draw some thirty illustrations for Chansons et Complaintes, a collection of poems published in 1959. That same year, he exhibited works at two Parisian galleries and at Juan-les-Pins on the Côte d'Azur. From 1961, he exhibited annually at the Salon des Artistes Français. In 1962, the City of Paris purchased his painting Un dimanche; its location is unknown.

Beginning in the 1950s, his works included stylized portraits similar in some ways to the "big eyes" art of Margaret Keane, though it is uncertain that either artist influenced the other. Keane painted children, and so did Serrier, sometimes from life, but Serrier’s models are usually somewhat older, though uniformly slender and with androgynous features.

A gallery owner introduced Serrier to American collectors Edgar Garbisch and his wife, Bernice Chrysler (daughter of Chrysler founder Walter P. Chrysler), who had a particular interest in naïve art; they commissioned a series of portraits from Serrier. At the same time, he met Reine Ausset in Paris, who in 1961 invited him to New York to take part in an exhibition at Galerie Norval on 57th Street. The show also included work by Moïse Kisling, and the exhibition program explicitly linked the two artists, saying that Serrier, who considered Kisling "the Master," had found his own technique, but "the same vision joins the grand Kisling to the young Serrier: plenitude of shapes, sureness of palette, precision in outlines."

In the 1960s he began painting slender, young, androgynous figures in groups, set in sparse landscapes with suggestions of the surreal and sometimes wearing costumes of the Commedia dell'arte. In some of these paintings the eyes of the figures are completely black, a motif that would continue in his later work.

His daughter Françoise was born in 1962. He decided to have no more children, uncertain of his future as an artist and worried that he would have difficulty supporting a family.

In 1965, he exhibited at Forest and Reed Gallery in London. Also in 1965, he discovered the small town of Martel, and with his old roommate Jean-Baptiste Valadié purchased a house that they opened as the gallery La Licorne (The Unicorn) in 1967.

== Surrealism and absurdist art ==
Responding to the political upheavals of May 1968 in France, and following the advice of Geneva gallery owner Roger Ferrero, Serrier's work became increasingly complex, idiosyncratic, and surreal. Imagery included the Tower of Babel, bodies suspended in space, and crowds of people all dressed alike, with identical features and entirely black eyes. Mannequins, playing cards, nudes, and levitating orbs also figured in the work. In a nod to Magritte, his men sometimes wear bowler hats. Another influence may have been the works of the Franco-Belgian surrealist Gaston Bogaert (1918-2008). Serrier's first major exhibit of these works, in Geneva in 1971, was titled Le Réalisme Fantastique.

In 1972, he was made a member of the Société du Salon d'Automne, under whose auspices he was invited by the Polish government to exhibit in Warsaw in 1973, as part of a cultural exchange across the Iron Curtain. In 1976, he served on the jury of the Salon d'Automne.

In 1975, New Orleans gallery owner Kurt E. Schon brought his work to several cities in the United States. A copiously illustrated monograph in English, Surrealism and the Absurd: Jean Pierre Serrier, was published in 1977. Author Thomas M. Bayer wrote:

Serrier's world is one where—to use Friedrich Nietzsche's term—the "human herd animal" is being confronted with the overwhelming task of coping with the world, his solitude, and at times, his resignation in the face of its monstrous size and duration. It is a world where the characterless, "blind" man faces the institutions, rules and symbols that made him into the being he now is…But Serrier does not lose himself in this world he portrays. He never forgets the old French tradition, the "black" humor, à la Molière. This classical humor at times is more felt than seen, in a manner that can be terribly funny, because it is horrifying, laughable, poignant and always true.

Serrier told a friend, "In each of my paintings there's a message of hope amid the crowd of stereotypical figures. It could be an escaping dirigible, or a nymphet who flees like a deer under the red and blue trees of paradise."

In 1986, Schon mounted The First Major Retrospective Exhibition of Works by French Surrealist Jean Pierre Serrier in New York. The venue was Automation House, a "center for working out problems caused by automation, and for developing and displaying technological art."

== Death and legacy ==
On March 30, 1989, at the age of 54, Serrier died by suicide. His last works were exhibited that year at the Salon d'Angers and at Galerie Ferrero in Geneva.

The journalist Marie-France Coquard remembered him as "the most generous and faithful friend one could imagine. He forgave everything without passing judgment, often giving more than he received…Jean Pierre gave away, beyond counting, lithographs, artist's proofs…drawings, paintings, his own as well as those of his colleagues. And he did so just as you might give a flower from your garden to a friend who has come to visit."

In 2017, the Musée de Montmartre hosted the program Jean Pierre Serrier, Peintre surréaliste montmartrois.

His works in museums include:

- The Shoot Gallery (1968) at the Canton Museum of Art in Ohio.
- L'Autre Côté du Mur (The Other Side of the Wall) at the Arnot Art Museum in Elmira, New York; exhibited in the show The Surreal in 2021.

A 21st-century auction record for a work by Serrier was set by Course de Vélo (1973), sold for $8125 (including premium) at Neal in New Orleans in 2022.

== Gallery: Evolution of the artist's signature ==
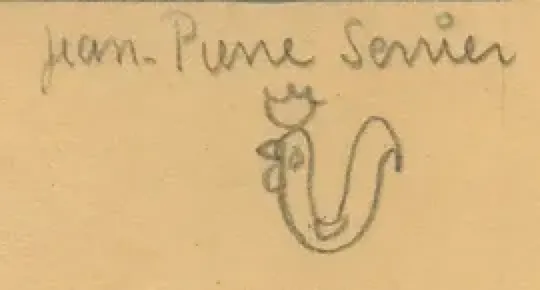
1950s

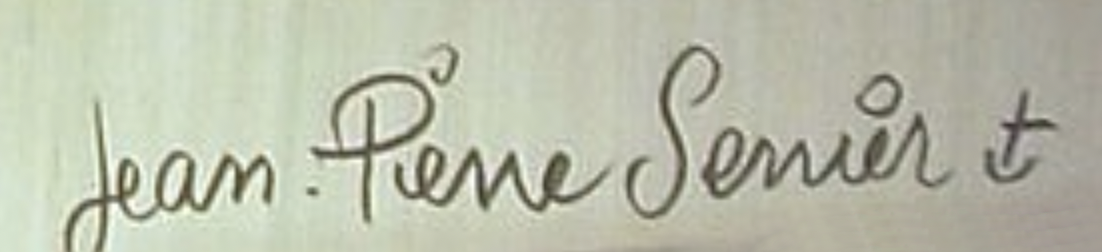
1950s

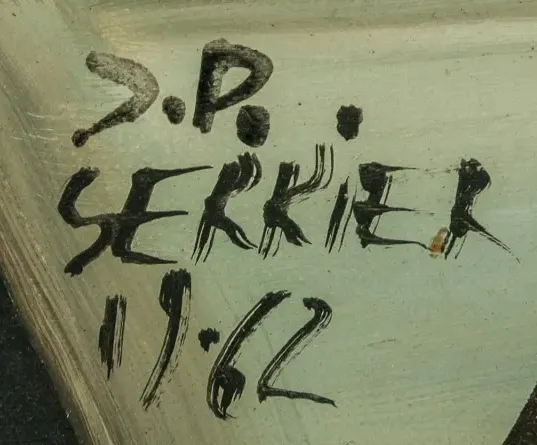
1962

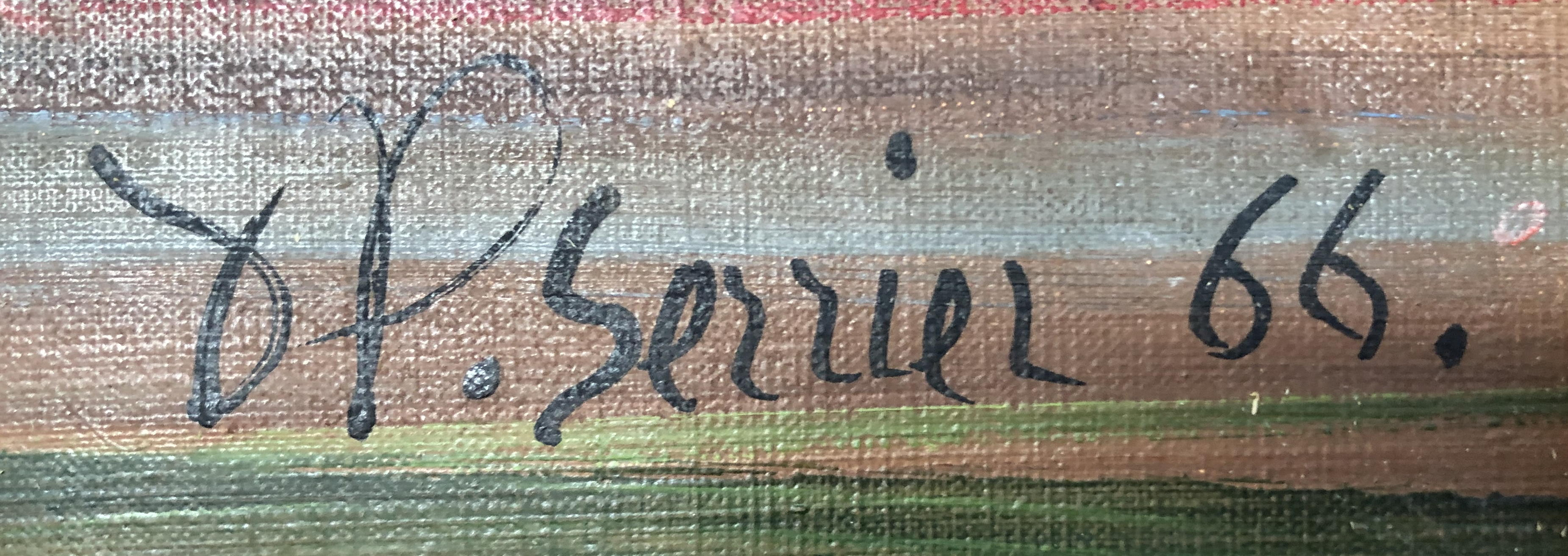
1966

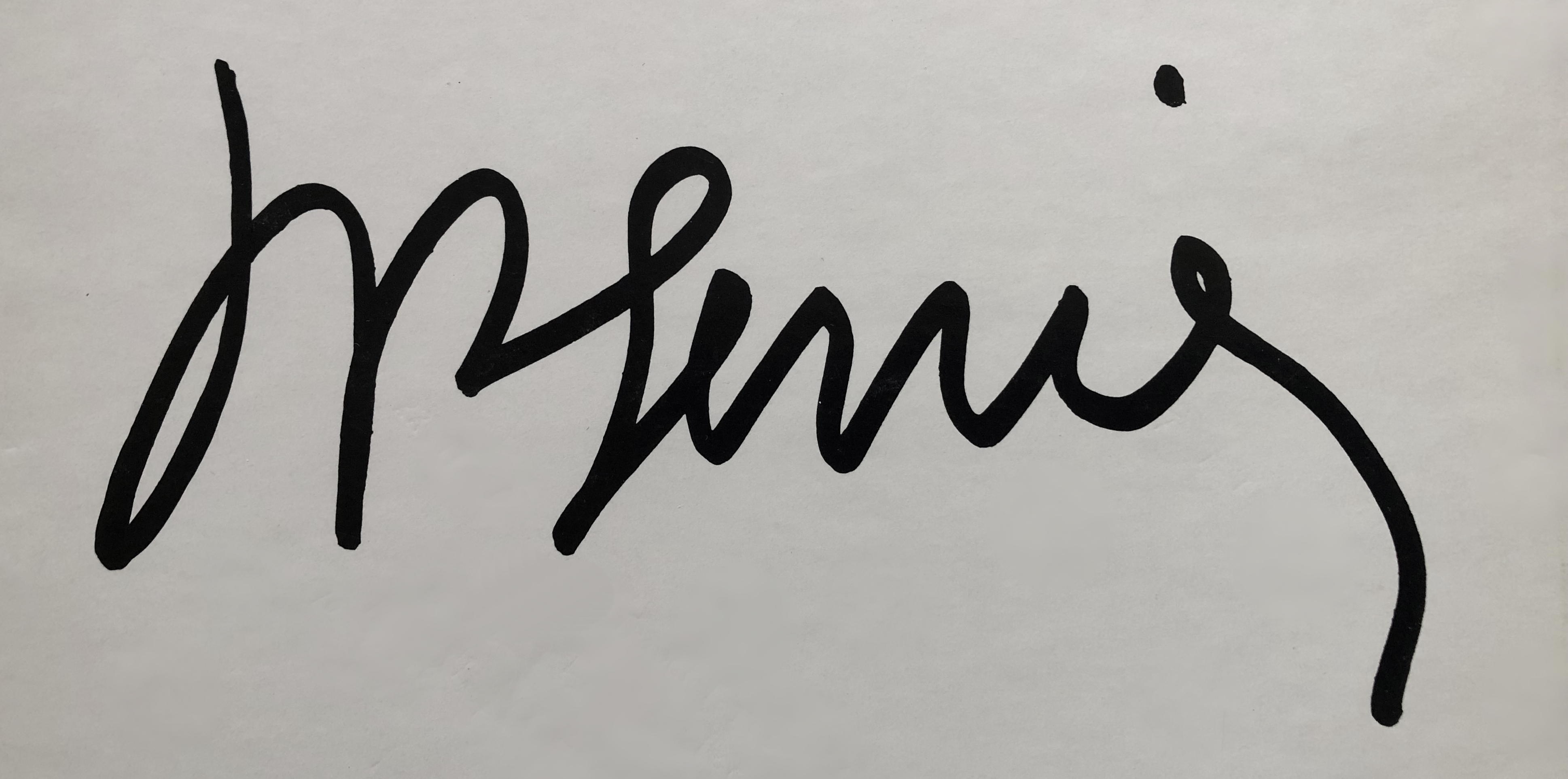
c. 1977
