= Philippe Beck =

French writer

- Born: April 21, 1963 (age 63); Strasbourg, France
- Occupations: Poet, writer and university professor
- Writing career
- Genre: poetry

Philippe Beck (born April 21, 1963, in Strasbourg) is a French poet, writer and professor for Philosophy at University of Nantes, in France and European Graduate School in Saas-Fee, Switzerland.

== Biography ==
Beck was a former student of the ENS de Saint-Cloud, having first attended to study philosophy in 1985. He completed a master in literature and an H. dip in philosophy, and later defended a doctoral thesis in philosophy (Histoire et imagination / History and imagination) under the supervision of Jacques Derrida. He has been a lecturer in Philosophy at the University of Nantes since 1995. His seminars mainly focus on aesthetics. Since 2006 Beck has been a professor of poetry at European Graduate School in Saas-Fee, Switzerland.

In 1990, he was a founding member of Alter, a journal of phenomenology (Ecole Normale Supérieure of Saint-Cloud). He was also the founder and editor in chief of the poetry magazine Quaderno (Ed. MeMo, Nantes, from 1998 to 2000), for which he wrote various articles on poetics and criticism. He is a member of the editorial board of Cités (Cities) and Droits de cités (Laws of Cities) (PUF) and of the journal Agenda de la pensée contemporaine (Calendar of Contemporary Thought) (Flammarion).

He was Writer in Residence at Château de Blandy-les-Tours in 2008 at Mission Stendhal Laureate in China in 2009. His poetic works have been featured in various magazines and anthologies. Some of his books and poems have been translated into English, Dutch, Korean and German.

Through his poetic work, Philippe Beck has collaborated with contemporary musicians and composers and has on numerous occasions. He is one of the co-writers of Gérard Pesson's opera libretto Pastorale. A number of Beck's works have also been put to music by Pesson: Chants populaires (Popular Songs) for the vocal ensemble Accentus. Beck's Lyre dure was also the basis for Philippe Mion's Oeuvre acousmatique (Acousmatic work), the premiere of which was held in 2009. In March 2013, the Montreal Symphony Orchestra under the direction of Kent Nagano premiered a work by Maxime McKinley, which was based on Beck's book In Nature.

Since October 2012 Beck has served as President of the Commission of poetry at the Centre national du livre (National Book Centre) in Paris.

An international symposium devoted to his work at the International Cultural Center Cerisy took place in 2013.

== Bibliography ==
=== Poetry ===
- Garde-manche hypocrite, Fourbis, 1996.
- Chambre à roman fusible, Al Dante, 1997.
- Verre de l'époque Sur-Eddy, Al Dante, 1998.
- Rude merveilleux, Al Dante, 1998.
- Le Fermé de l'époque, Al Dante, 1999.
- Dernière mode familiale, Flammarion, postface de Jean-Luc Nancy, 2000.
- Inciseiv, MeMo, 2000.
- Poésies didactiques, Théâtre typographique, 2001.
- Aux recensions, Flammarion, 2002.
- Dans de la nature, Flammarion, 2003.
- Garde-manche Deux, Textuel, 2004.
- Élégies Hé, Théâtre typographique, 2005.
- Déductions, Al Dante, 2005.
- Chants populaires, Flammarion, 2007.
- De la Loire, Argol, 2008.
- Lyre Dure, Nous, 2009.
- Poésies premières (1997–2000), Flammarion, 2011.
- Boustrophes, Texts & Crafts, 2011.
- Writing the Real: A Bilingual Anthology of Contemporary French Poetry (translated by Emma Wagstaff), Enitharmon Press, 2016.

=== Prose ===
- Contre un Boileau (esquisse), Horlieu, 1999.
- Du principe de la division de soi in Le colloque de nuit, éditions Le Temps qu'il fait, 2000.
- Beck, l'Impersonnage : rencontre avec Gérard Tessier, Argol, 2006.
- Un Journal, Flammarion, 2008.

=== Translations ===
- Walter Benjamin, "Expérience et pauvreté", translated by P. Beck, in Po&sie, n° 51, 1989.
- Samuel Taylor Coleridge, "Définition de la poésie", translated by P. Beck et É. Dayre, in Po&sie, n° 51, 1989.
- F. W. von Schelling, "Philosophie de l'art, § 39", translated by P. Beck, in Po&sie, n° 54, 1990.
- Walter Benjamin, "Crise du roman", translated and introduced by P. Beck et B. Stiegler, in Po&sie, n° 58, 1991.
- Walter Benjamin, "Théories du fascisme allemand", translated and introduced by P. Beck et B. Stiegler, in Lignes, n° 13, 1991.
- Karl Philipp Moritz, Le concept d'achevé en soi et autres écrits (1785–1793), texts introduced and translated by P. Beck, PUF, 1995.
- Samuel Taylor Coleridge, Les Sermons laïques (suivi de) L'Ami, translated and introduced by P. Beck et É. Dayre, Gallimard (Bibliothèque de Philosophie), 2002.

=== Essays and articles ===
- "Le Dit d'hypocrisie ensommeillé", in Po&sie, n° 66, 1993.
- "Le Quasi-sermon", in Critique, n° 571, 1994.
- "Minima Lyrica ou Lyrismes du rude boeuf", in Recueil, n° 30, 1994.
- "Mort et naïveté (Régime transcendantal et régime sentimental)", in Alter, n° 1 et 2, 1994.
- "La bête, question de projection animale", in Alter, n° 3, 1995.
- "Quelques remarques à propos d'une époque dans l'espace", in Alter, n° 4, 1996.
- "Logiques de l'impossibilité", préface à la Poétique d'Aristote, Gallimard (Tel), 1986.
- "Quelques remarques sur la prose apophantique en régime inchoatif", in Le poète que je cherche à être. Cahier Michel Deguy, La Table ronde/Belin, 1996.
- "Entretien" (à propos de Garde-manche hypocrite), in Biennale Internationale des poètes en Val-de-Marne, n° 19, 1997.
- "D'un fumier sans pourquoi (Thèses concernant la poésie)", in Lettres sur tous les sujets, n° 13, 1997.
- "Les turdidés, ou l'affaire du toucher à distance" (à propos de Dominique Fourcade), in Lettres sur tous les sujets, n° 13, 1997.
- "Les espèces confuses, désassorties", in Paroles à la bouche du présent : le négationnisme, histoire ou politique ?, Natacha Michel (dir.), Al Dante, 1997.
- "La vie saturée", in Analecta Husserliana, vol. L, 1997.
- "Précisions sur quelques thèses.", in Action Poétique, n° 150, 1998.
- "Quaderno : une idée de la poésie", in Art Press, n° 262, 2000.
- "L'époque de la poésie", in Littérature, n° 120, 2000.
- "Où va le vers", in Magazine littéraire, n° 396, 2001.
- "Méduse automatique stoppée", in Fin, n° 13, 2002.
- "Entretien" avec David Christoffel, on http://www.doublechange.com/issue3/beckint-fr.htm, 2003.
- "Sexicité", on http://www.sitaudis.com/Excitations/sexicite.php, 2003.
- "La vie pensée", on http://remue.net/spip.php?article135, 2004.
- "Si le corps est le lieu des pensées...", in Écrire, pourquoi ?, Argol, 2005.
- "Entretien" avec Emmanuel Laugier, in Le Matricule des anges, n° 81, 2007.
- "Modalisations", in Cahier Philippe Lacoue-Labarthe. L'Animal, n° 19-20, 2008.
- "La trompette modeste" (sur Sens de Walden de Stanley Cavell), in Agenda de la pensée contemporaine, n° 10, 2008.
- "La relation des jours" (sur le Journal de Jean-Patrick Manchette), in Agenda de la pensée contemporaine, n° 12, 2008–2009.
- "Entrer en poésie" (entretien), in Fragil La Gazette, n° 4, 2009. (http://www.fragil.org/magazine/numéro/1057)
- "D'un espace espéré ou : la danse pré-pensive de Keith Waldrop", in Agenda de la pensée contemporaine, n° 13, 2009.
- "Dimensions ou : Optique, geste et comportement", in La vue et la voix, Pierre Ouellet (dir.), vlb éd., Montréal, 2009.
- "La poésie du geste" (Anthropologie poétique, poétique de l'anthropologie : Marcel Jousse), in Agenda de la pensée contemporaine, n° 15, 2009.
- "Entretien" (à propos de Lyre Dure) avec Martin Rueff et Tiphaine Samoyaut, on http://www.m-e-l.fr/rencontres-publiques.php?id=124, 2010.
- "La suite (voix)", entretien avec Benoît Casas, in Grumeaux, n° 2, NOUS, 2010.
- "Hugo Friedrich : réalité, monologue et subjectivité dans la poésie du XXe siècle", in Po&sie, n° 136, Belin, 2e trim. 2011.
- "Le poétisme aveugle, ou la bataille du critère voilé", in CCP, n° 22, 2011.
- "Musique et poésie", in Fusées, n° 20, 2011.
- "Poétique et critique, ou : l'ascendant romantique de Genette", in "Les facultés de juger : critique et vérité", Textuel, n° 64, Paris 7-Denis Diderot, 2011.
- "L'ironie de la basseur : note sur la hauteur expressive et les intensités sémantiques", in Lignes, n° 38, mai 2012.

=== Documents ===
- "Maintenant Philippe Beck", in La Polygraphe, n° 13-14, 2000.
- "Philippe Beck, une poésie recommence", in il particolare, n° 7-8, 2002.
- "Philippe Beck", in Amastra-N-Gallar (Gallicean magazine), n° 14, 2007.
- "Cahier : Philippe Beck", in il particolare, n° 24, 2011.
