= Thierry Metz =

French poet

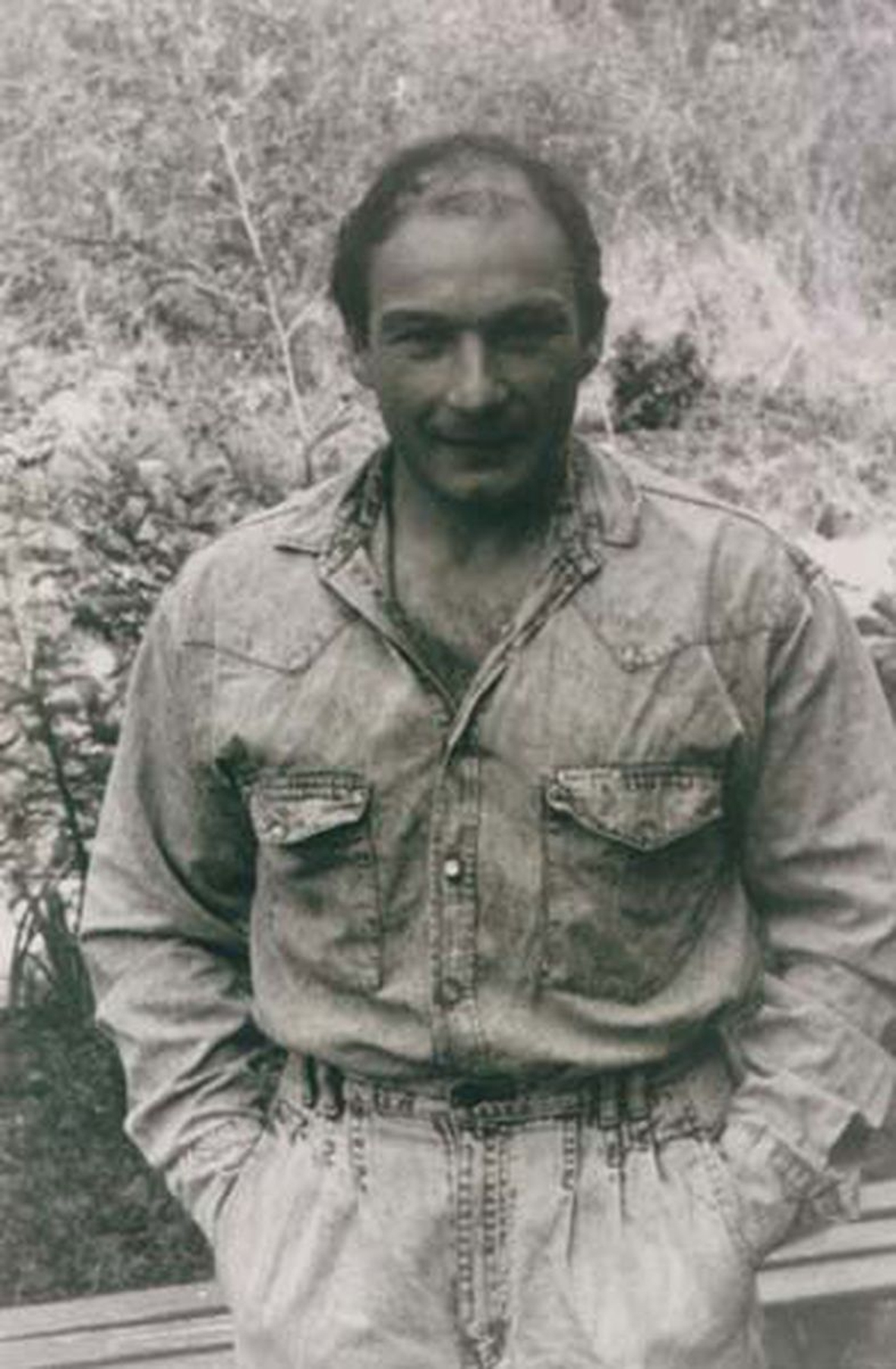
Tmetz4

Thierry Metz (1956–1997) was a French poet. He also worked on construction sites as a labourer and a mason. Metz came into the limelight in 1989 when poet Jean Cussat-Blanc published his work. Some of Metz's publications were turned into documentaries. In 1997, Thierry Metz killed himself when he sank into depression and alcohol after his youngest kid was killed by a car.

== Life ==
At the age of 21, Metz moved with his family to Saint-Romain-le-Noble. There he worked as a yard labourer, a mason, and then a farm worker. During intervening periods of unemployment he wrote.

== Books by Thierry ==
- De l'un à l'autre. Toiles filées de Denis Castaing (French Edition) published in 01-Jan-1996. It was co-authored by, Thierry Metz, Paul Amouroux and Denis Castaing.
- Tel que c'est écrit (Mass Market Paperback) – 1 Dec. 2012
- Journal d’Un Manoeuvre: A31332 (Folio) Pocket Book – 18 Mar. 2004
- Terre Paperback – 1 Sept. 2003
- L' Homme qui penche Paperback – Big Book, 8 May 2017
- Lettres à la bien-aimée - 12 Jan. 1995
- Dolmen suivi de La Demeure phréatique
- Jaguar A/E

== Awards ==
Thierry won the Prix Voronca in 1988. He also won the Prix Froissart in 1989.
