= Doete de Troyes =

- Born: 1220; Troyes
- Died: 1265 (aged 44–45)
- Known for: Poetry

Doete de Troyes was a poet and minstrel, born in Troyes in 1220 and died in 1265.

== Biography ==
=== Life ===
Doete de Troyes was born in 1220, in Troyes.

Doete de Troyes is known for her songs, for which she composed both the words and the music. Along with her brother, Doete de Troyes was a member of the court of Conrad IV of Germany in Mainz.

Doete de Troyes died in 1265.

=== Known work ===
- Vers chantés au couronnement de l'Empereur Conrad, à Mayence
- Vers adressés à l'Empereur Conrad dont elle refusa les faveurs
