= Roger Milliot =

French writer

Roger Milliot (1927, Le Creusot – 1968) was a French poet and painter. He served as a soldier in Indochina and as such had a pension. His health problems prevented him from becoming an interior decorator. Like his idol René Char, he preferred provincial life to that of Paris and lived in Montauban, where there is now a museum of his paintings, mostly portraits of women. His depression and feelings of frustration led him to suicide by drowning in the Seine river. His poems were published posthumously.

== Works ==
- QUI?, 1968
- QUI?, 1969 – definitive edition, illustrated and with a portrait
