= Soligny-les-Étangs =

Commune in Grand Est, France

- Commune
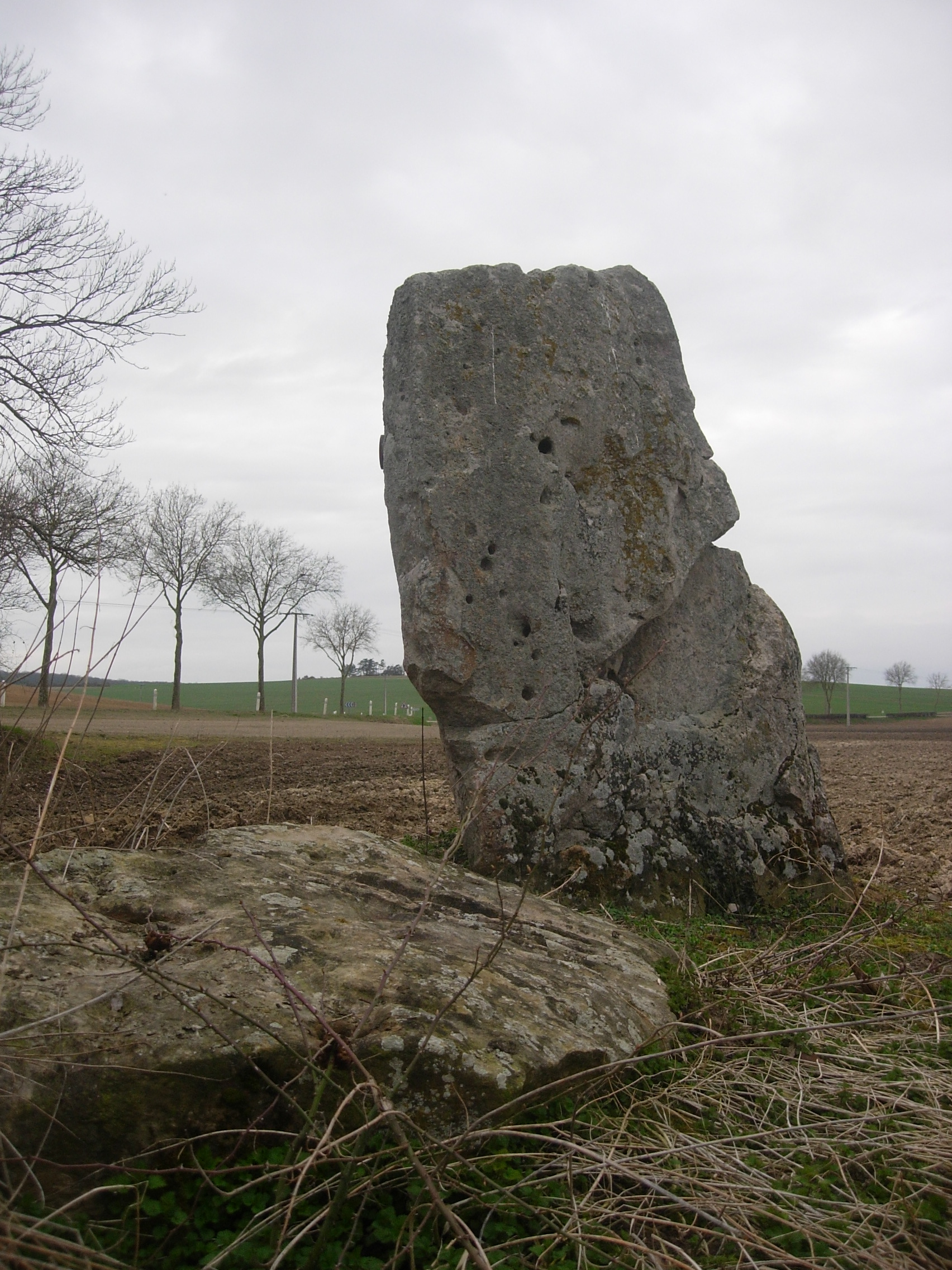
- Menhir
- Location of Soligny-les-Étangs
- Location within France Location within Grand Est
- Coordinates: 48°24′29″N 3°30′38″E
- Country: France
- Region: Grand Est
- Department: Aube
- Arrondissement: Nogent-sur-Seine
- Canton: Nogent-sur-Seine
- Intercommunality: Nogentais

Government
  - Mayor (2020–2026): Raphaële Lanthiez
- Area^{1}: 15.94 km^{2} (6.15 sq mi)
- Elevation: 75 m (246 ft)
- Population (2023): 262
  - Density: 16.4/km^{2} (42.6/sq mi)
- Time zone: UTC+01:00 (CET)
  - Summer (DST): UTC+02:00 (CEST)
- INSEE/Postal code: 10370 /10400
- ^{1} French Land Register data, which excludes lakes, ponds, glaciers > 1 km^{2} (0.386 sq mi or 247 acres) and river estuaries.

Soligny-les-Étangs (French pronunciation: [sɔliɲi le.z‿etɑ̃]) is a commune in the Aube department in north-central France.

== Population ==
Historical population
Year	Pop.	±% p.a.
1968	196	—
1975	151	−3.66%
1982	133	−1.80%
1990	146	+1.17%
1999	180	+2.35%
2007	219	+2.48%
2012	223	+0.36%
2017	239	+1.40%
2023	262	+1.54%
Source: INSEE

== See also ==
- Communes of the Aube department
