= Kossi Aguessy =

Togolese industrial artist and designer

KossiGan Baaba-Thunde Aguessy
- Born: 1977 (age 48–49); Lomé, Togo
- Died: 2017
- Occupations: Industrial artist and designer

Kossi Aguessy (1977–2017; full name KossiGan Baaba-Thunde Aguessy) was a Togolese and Brazilian industrial designer and artist. He had lived in the United Kingdom, the United States and France.

== Biography ==
Born April 17, 1977, in Lomé, Togo, Aguessy studied industrial and interior design at the Central Saint Martins College of Arts and Design in London.

Independent since 2004, he had collaborated with the StarkNetwork in Paris before establishing his eponymous studio in Paris, France, in 2008, while also taking on the role of art director for the London-based, pan-African television channel VoxAfrica, where he was responsible for the visual and broadcasting identity of the media.

In 2008, his Useless Tool, a chair manufactured using military aircraft technology, made international design headlines during the Please Do Not Sit exhibition in Paris.

In 2009, his self-produced Sparkling Joke coffee table, designed using recycled polyethylene terephthalate (PET) bottles and caps, caught the eye of Coca-Cola. He began a collaboration with them, leading to the creation of the Coca Cola Sustainable Design Awards trophy and a set of furniture made with the US beverages company and of recycled materials.

In 2010, Aguessy was featured with several of his works, including his emblematic Useless Chair, the Soissons porcelain floor lamp, and the 3some vase, by the Museum of Arts and Design in New York City in the Global Africa Project, an exhibition co-curated by Lowery Stokes Sims, MAD's Charles Bronfman International Curator, and Leslie King-Hammond. His work has been part of the MAD Museum's permanent collection since 2011.

Aguessy's research in new manufacturing technologies and sustainable energy sources led him to the establishment of the first Fab Lab (FabricationLaboratory), organized by the French Industrial Prospective and the Centre Pompidou, in Porto Novo, Benin, in February 2012.

That same year, he designed and manufactured Koss, the official 2012 present for the presidency of the United Nations Security Council, and conceived The Guardian, the monument celebrating the 50th anniversary of Togolese independence, while the Beaubourg Museum's Multiversités Créatives exhibition showcased the designer's first Benin Designed pieces.

In 2013 The KossiAguessy Studio moved from Paris to London and New York.

Aguessy's works have been in the permanent collection of the Beaubourg museum collection since 2013. As such, he became the first African-descent designer having a nominative section in the French contemporary arts and design museum.

Aguessy died on April 17, 2017.

== Awards and exhibitions ==
- Biographiques, Paris, 2003
- Biographiques, Art Shanghaï SAF, Shanghai, China, 2004/2005
- France 5 Exhibition, Paris, France, 2005
- Performance, ArtParis, France, 2006
- Fifi Design Awards 2007, Best 20 Perfume design, 2007
- Please Do Not Sit, Tools Gal, Paris, 2008
- WallPapper UK 10 best Design Awards, 2010
- Sustainable Design Award, 2010
- Freeze Art London, UK, 2010
- G.A.P, Museum of Arts and Design MAD, New York USA, 2010–2011
- Permanent Collection, MoMA ps1, 2011
- Conversation(s), Bensimon Gal, Paris, 2011
- Permanent Collection, Museum of Arts and Design MAD, New-York USA, 2011
- Multiversités Créatives, Musée George Pompidou/ Beaubourg, Paris, France, 2012
- Magic, Bensimon Gal, Paris, 2012
- BrancoNegro, Artcurial, Paris, 2012
- Permanent Collection, Musée George Pompidou/ Beaubourg, Paris, France, 2013
- Making Africa - A Continent of Contemporary Design, Vitra Design Museum, Germany, 2015
- OCTOBRE ORANGE, Vallois Gallery, Paris, 2015

== References and notes ==
- Centre Georges Pompidou ressources,
- MAD Museum resources
