= Watriquet de Couvin =

14th century French poet

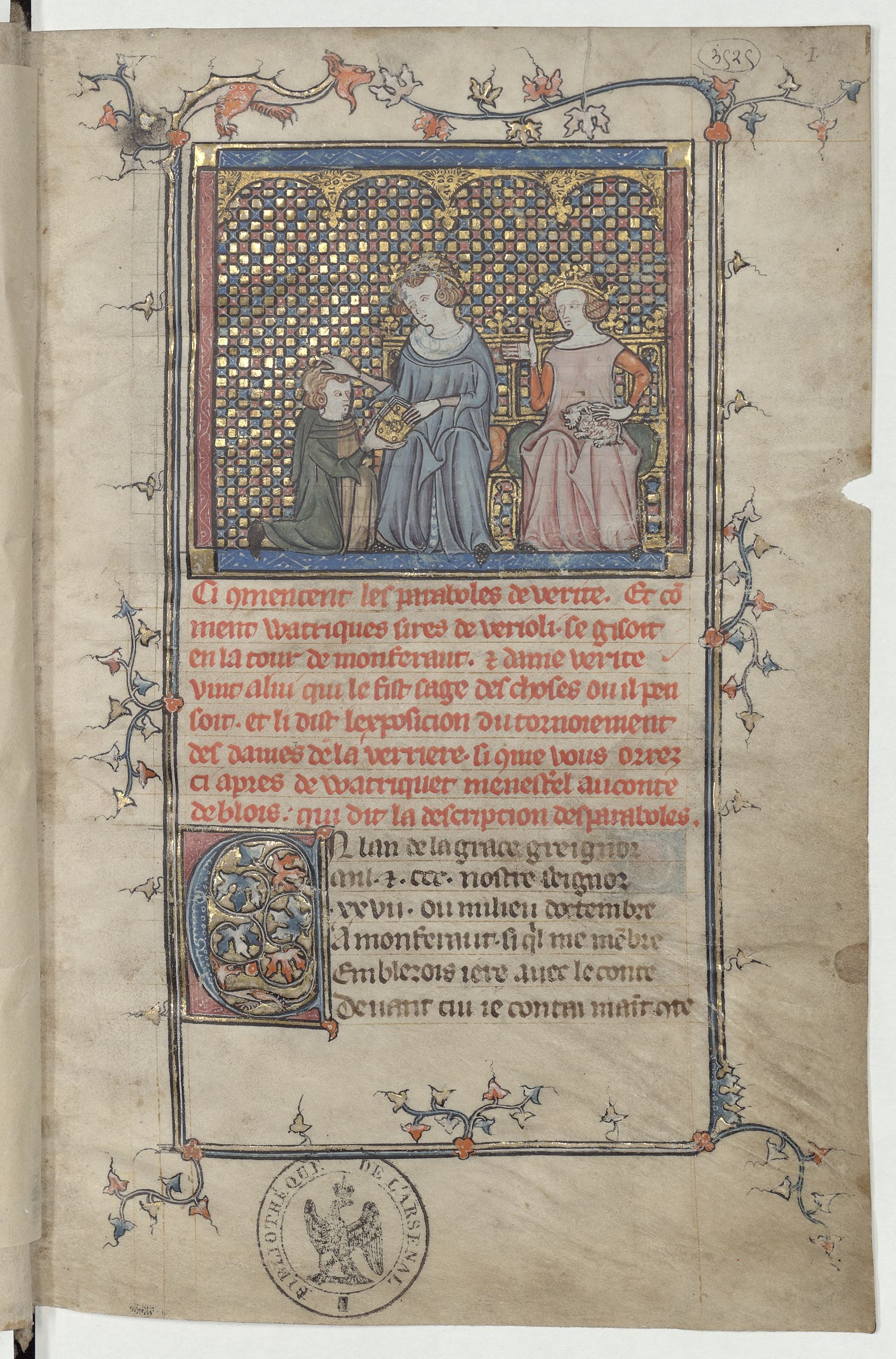
Presentation miniature from a copy of Watriquet's Dits given to King Charles V of France

Watriquet de Couvin was a fourteenth century French poet active between 1319 and 1329, and one of the few named authors of medieval French fabliaux. Among his other poems, he is known for his moralistic "dits".

Watriquet de Couvin was a contemporary of the minstrels Jean de Condé and Jacques de Baisieux. His writings recommended submission to the Church, protection of the poor, and respect for women.

== Bibliography ==
- Histoire littéraire de la France, Quatorzième siècle, par des religieux bénédictins de la congrégation de Saint-Maur, 1866.
- Ch. V. Langlois, Histoire littéraire de la France, Paris, 1921, T. XXXV.
