= André Frédérique =

French poet

André Frédérique (27 February 1915, Nanterre - 17 May 1957) was a French poet. He was a son of a police officer. He became a member of the Parisienne bohème (befriending people like Jean Carmet). His works, often full of black humour (which did not save him from suicide caused by his feeling of a metaphysical hopelessness) are similar to Henri Michaux.

== Works ==
- Ana, Éd. Plaisir du prince, 1945
- Histoires blanches, Gallimard, 1946 (published with the help of Raymond Queneau)
- Aigremorts, Guy Lévis-Mano, 1947
- Poésie sournoise, Seghers, 1957
