= Poète maudit =

Poet living a life outside or against society

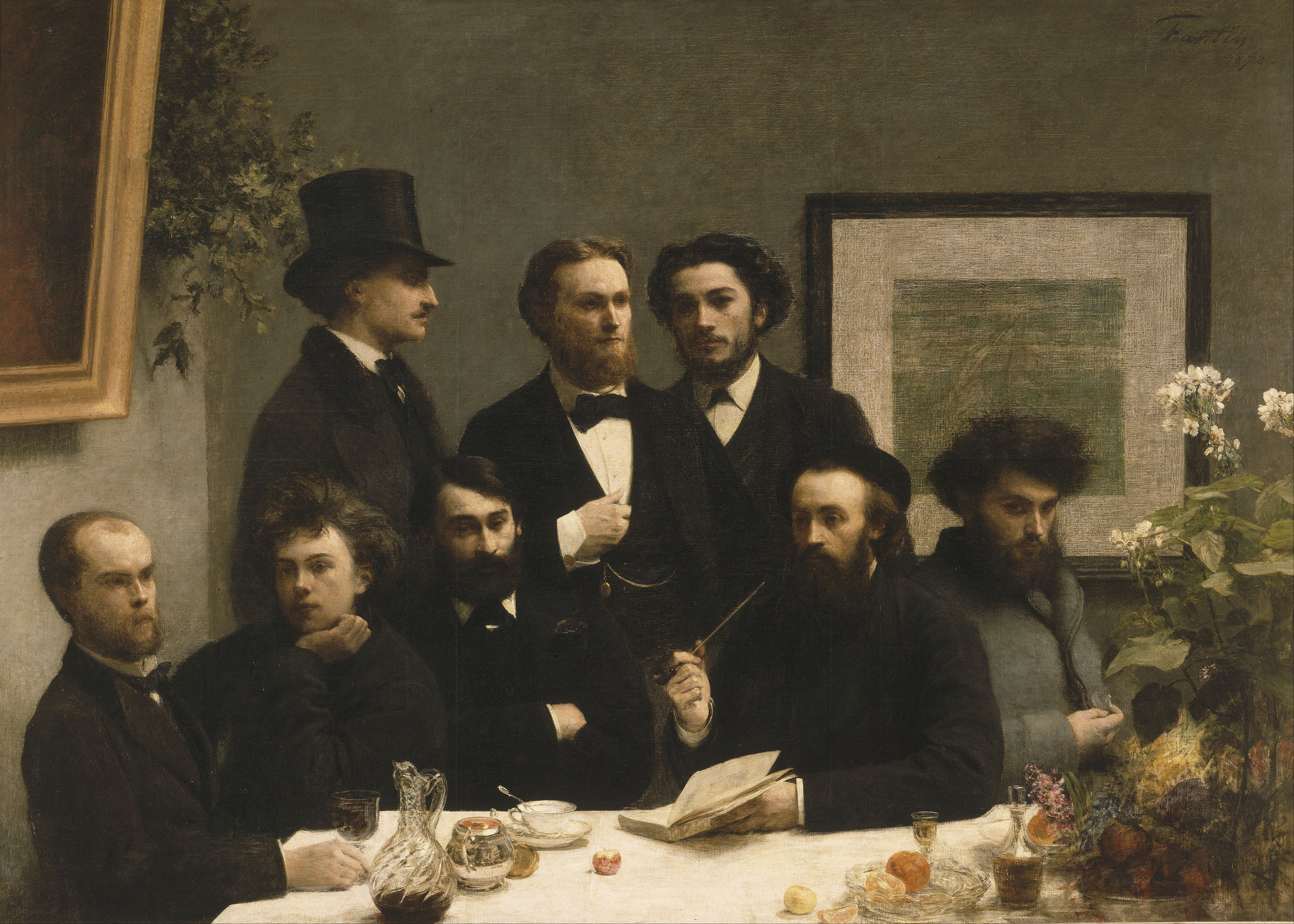
Poètes maudits Paul Verlaine (far left) and Arthur Rimbaud (second to left) depicted in The Corner of the Table by Henri Fantin-Latour, 1872

A poète maudit (French pronunciation: [pɔɛt modi], literally "cursed poet") is a poet living a life outside or against society. Insanity, crime, violence, abuse of alcohol or other drugs, and in general any societal sin, often resulting in an early death, are typical elements of the biography of a poète maudit.

== History of the term ==
The phrase poète maudit (literally, "accursed poet") was coined in the beginning of the 19th century by Alfred de Vigny in his 1832 novel Stello, in which he calls the poet "la race toujours maudite par les puissants de la terre" (the race that will always be cursed by the powerful ones of the earth). Charles Baudelaire, Paul Verlaine and Arthur Rimbaud are considered typical examples. Lautréamont or Alice de Chambrier are also considered as poètes maudits, as is the American 20th-century poet Hart Crane.

The term came into wider usage since Verlaine's eponymous anthology. Originally it was used just for the writers in his book (see below), but then it became a name for writers (or even artists in general) whose lives and art are outside or against their society. For example, the poet and publisher Pierre Seghers published an anthology Poètes maudits d'aujourd'hui: 1946–1970 ("The accursed poets of today: 1946–1970") in Paris in 1972, collecting authors such as Antonin Artaud, Jean-Pierre Duprey and 10 others, some of whom (like Artaud) became very famous posthumously.

The term is also used outside France. Examples include American poet Delmore Schwartz, whom Mark Ford called "America's most genuine claimant to the title", Canadian poet Paul Potts, Czech poet Karel Hynek Mácha, the Polish poet Rafał Wojaczek and the Italian poet Salvatore Toma; Wojaczek and Toma committed suicide at an early age. Another notable example of poète maudit is Dino Campana, an Italian author famous for his only poetry collection, the Canti Orfici, who died in a psychiatric hospital at the age of forty-six.

== Les Poètes maudits ==
Les Poètes maudits is a work by Paul Verlaine that was published in 1884. The work is a homage to Tristan Corbière, Arthur Rimbaud, Stéphane Mallarmé, Marceline Desbordes-Valmore, Villiers de l'Isle-Adam and Pauvre Lélian (Paul Verlaine himself, the name being an anagram).

== Gallery ==
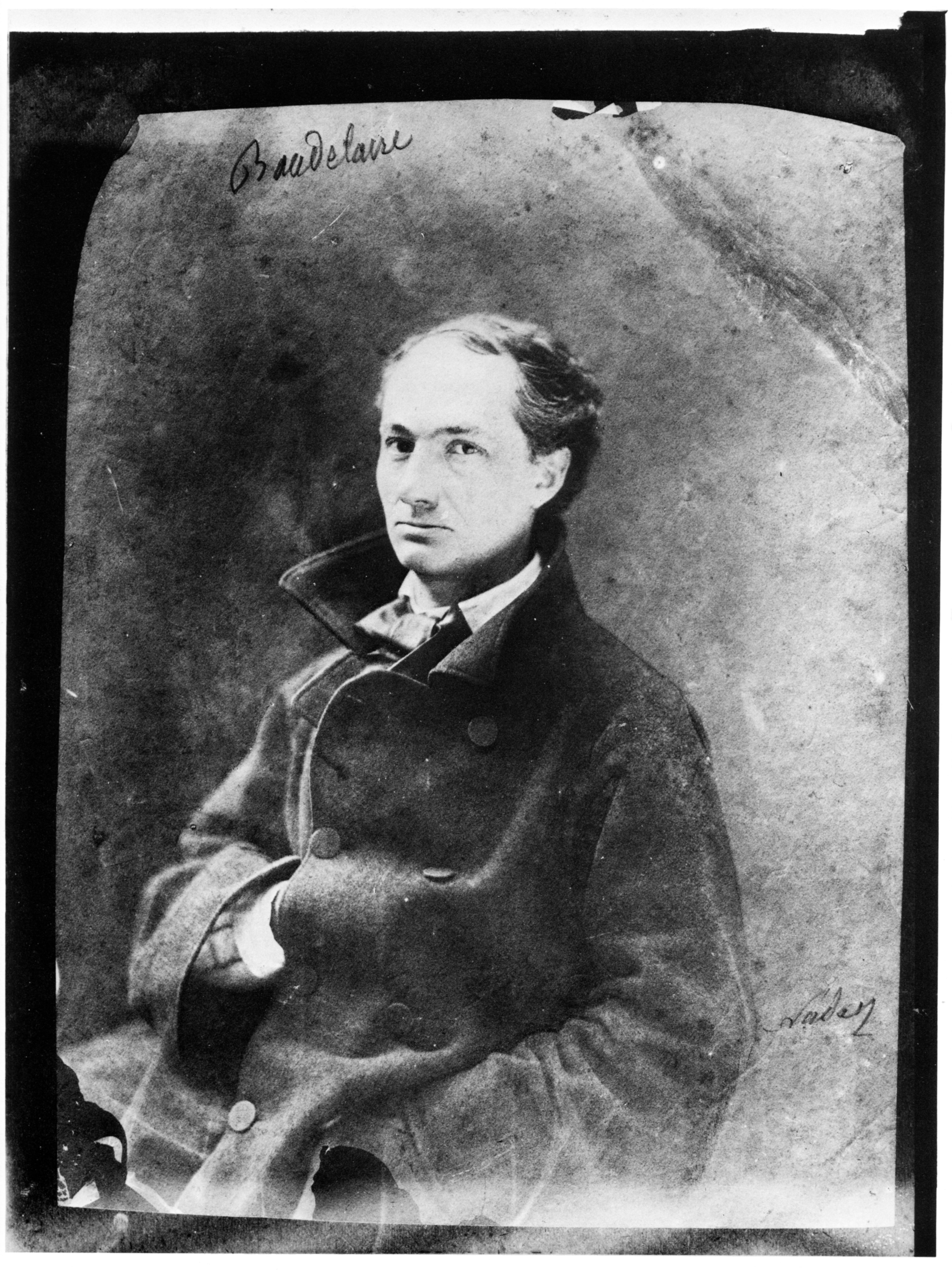
Portrait of Charles Baudelaire by Nadar (1855)

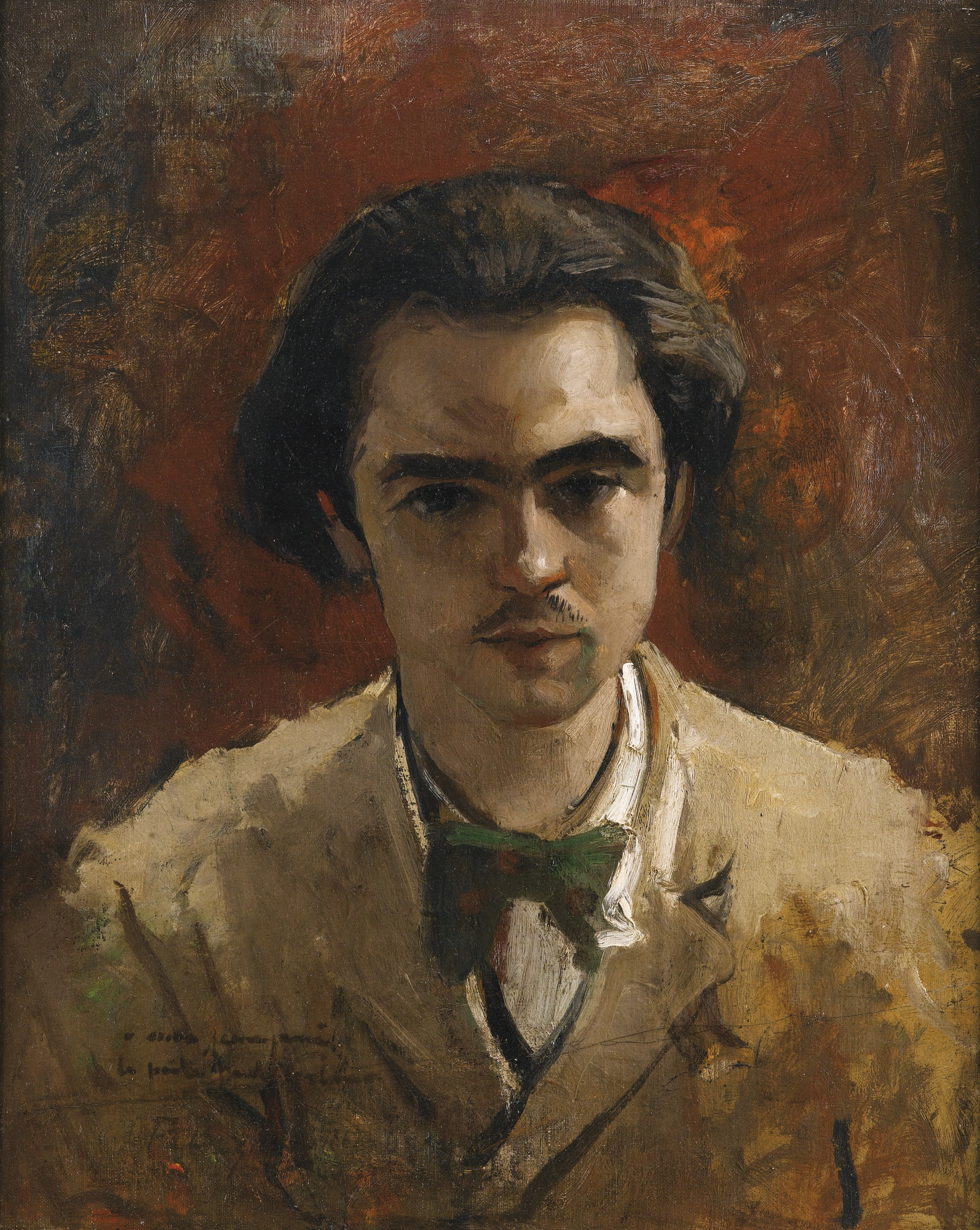
Paul Verlaine by Frédéric Bazille (1867)

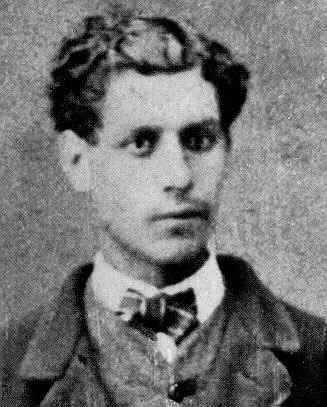
Comte de Lautréamont by Jacques Lefrère
(before 1870)

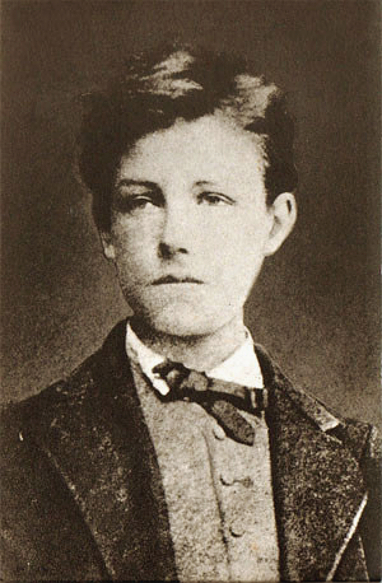
Arthur Rimbaud at the age of seventeen by Étienne Carjat (c.1872)
