= Anne de Marquets =

French Catholic theological poet

Anne de Marquets was a French Catholic nun and poet from the priory of Poissy. She was likely born around 1533 in the Comté d'Eu of a noble family.

== Biography ==
She entered the convent at Poissy at a very young age, where she proved to be gifted in ancient languages as well as in creative writing. The education Anne de Marquets received in the convent was certainly exceptional for a young girl of her time. In sixteenth-century France, the convent was a place where women had more access to education than in the outside world. As part of her education, Anne even studied with the humanist printer Henri Estienne.

In 1561, Anne de Marquets attended the Colloquy at Poissy, an event which would influence her poetry. Following the colloquy, she wrote several poems and prayers in verse for Catholic leaders. This first collection of poems, entitled Sonets, prières et devises, was published in 1562, and dedicated to Charles, Cardinal of Lorraine. Following this, she began to collaborate with the irenic theologian, Claude D'Espence.

In 1568, she proved herself to be a talented Latinist when she published a translation of Marcantonio Flaminio's De Rebus Divinis Carmina (1550), a collection of Latin devotional poems, under the title Les Divines Poésies de Marc Antoine Flaminius (The Divine Poems of Marc Antonio Flaminio). The volume also includes original poems by the Dominican about spiritual subjects. Her poetic talent was praised by several of the greatest poets of her time, such as Pierre de Ronsard.

Anne de Marquets died in 1588. A book of her sonnets, Les Sonets spirituels, was published in 1605. Though this publication was posthumous, the poems in the book had already circulated in manuscript.

In the past few decades, scholars have begun to recognise the talent that won her so much praise in the sixteenth century: "These sonnets form a complete devotional sequence of 480 sonnets […] they are therefore far more advanced, in terms of the application of systematic devotional practice to poetry, than anything written in the 1570s and 1580s." Anne de Marquets' sonnets are also noteworthy because they exhibit the influence of post-Tridentine spirituality, in particular an interaction with contemporary meditation techniques. Like her contemporary, Gabrielle de Coignard, her poems all touch on religious (Catholic) themes and imagery.
