= Dominique Aguessy =

Beninese writer

- Born: March 31, 1937 (age 89); Cotonou, Bénin
- Education: University of Bordeaux, University of Dakar, Templeton College
- Occupation: novelist
- Children: 3
- Writing career
- Language: French
- Years active: 1973-now

Dominique Aguessy (born March 31, 1937) is a Beninese writer, poet, former sociology researcher, and trade union congress member.

== Early life ==
Aguessy was born in Benin, but is now a French national.

Aguessy has a bachelor's degree in French language and literature from the University of Bordeaux and a master's in sociology from the University of Dakar, as well as a management degree from Templeton College in Oxford.

From 1956 to 1958 and from 1964 to 1970, she was a cultural program producer for the national radio broadcasting of Senegal and the Office de co-operacion radiophonique.

== Personal life ==
Aguessy has three children.

She currently lives in Brussels, where she's settled since 1973.

== Career ==
=== Union work ===
From 1973 to 1985, she held three four-year elective mandates as deputy general secretary of the World Confederation of Labor.

=== Sociological work ===
Aguessy was a researcher at the Institute of Sociology of the ULB in Brussels working with Gabriel Thoveron.

From 1985 to 2000, she worked for the European Commission and the Association of the ACP chambers of commerce, making research trips to Southeast Asia, Africa, Latin America, Central Europe, the United States and Canada.

=== Literary work ===
Her literary career began in 1993, with the publication of her first collection of poems Les chemins de la sagesse, contes et légendes du Sénégal et du Bénin (en: "The Paths of Wisdom, Tales and Legends of Senegal and Benin"). She calls literature her third career.

She considers her third poetry collection Comme un souffle fragile, poèmes méditations, published by édition Parole et Silence in 2005, to be primarily about hope, since she believes the focus when talking about Africa is too much on misery, as opposed to the happiness she sees.

Her work often also includes themes of spirituality.

== Publications ==
=== Stories and novels ===
- Les chemins de la sagesse, contes et légendes du Sénégal et du Bénin, éditions L'Harmattan, Paris, 1993
- La maison aux sept portes, contes et légendes du Bénin, éditions L'Harmattan, Paris, 1996
- Le caméléon bavard, contes et légendes du Sénégal et du Bénin, éditions L'Harmattan, Paris, 1994
- Contes du Bénin, L'oracle du hibou, édition Maisonneuve et Larose, Paris, 2004
- La soif des oasis, preface by Sylvestre Clancier, Éditions du Cygne, Paris, 2008

=== Novellas ===
- Les raisins de mer, nouvelles, éditions L'Harmattan, Paris, 2013

=== Essays ===
- Pouvoir et démocratie à l'épreuve du Syndicalisme, essai, Unesco Breda, Dakar, 1994

=== Poems and poetry collections ===
- L'aube chante à plusieurs voix, poèmes, preface by Emile Kesteman, illustration by Titane De Vos, édition de l'Acanthe, 1999
- Le gué des hivernages, poèmes, preface by Cheikh Hamidou Khane and Oumar Sankharé, édition la Porte des Poètes, Paris, 2002
- Comme un souffle fragile, poèmes méditations, édition Parole et Silence, Paris et Le Muveran, 2005
- Tant de chemins ouverts, Éditions du Cygne, France, 2010
- Marges et Rivages, éditions L'Harmattan, Paris, 2018
- Bleurs d'aurore, Éditions du Cygne, Paris, 2021

==== Anthology contributions ====
- Nous, la multitude, with Xavier Abert, Max Alhau, and Guy Allix, Temps de Cerises, 2011

=== Autobiographical ===
- Un combat aux milles visages, éditions L'Harmattan, Paris, 2021
