= Jean-Pierre Duprey =

French poet and sculptor

- Born: January 1, 1930; Rouen, France
- Died: October 2, 1959 (aged 29); Paris, France
- Occupations: Poet and sculptor

Jean-Pierre Duprey (1 January 1930, in Rouen – 2 October 1959, in Paris) was a French poet and sculptor, one of the modern examples of a poète maudit (accursed poet).

Duprey said "I, I shouldn't have got stuck in this galaxy!" André Breton, fascinated by the darkness and imagery in Duprey's poetry, invited the author to Paris in 1948. Duprey's books are not a celebration of death, neither do they find comfort in thinking about it. All questions asked in the poems of his last book The End and the Means (1970) are left unanswered, but their author found a way somewhere "beyond" (Jouffroy, 1970, quoted in).

He had a sense for scandals, too. One day he went to the grave of the Unknown Soldier by the Arc de Triomphe and urinated on the eternal flame for which he was arrested and beaten in the jail; later also taken to a mental hospital. Between 1951 and 1958 he did not write and concentrated on working on sculptures. He wrote his final book in 1959 and upon completion, he asked his wife to send the manuscript to Breton. When she returned from the post office, she found him dead; he had hanged himself in his studio.

Three days before his death, he said calmly to a friend: "I am allergic to this planet".

== Bibliography ==
- Derrière son double, Le Soleil Noir, 1950
- La Forêt sacrilège, Le Soleil Noir, 1964
- La Fin et la manière, Le Soleil Noir, 1970
- Œuvres complètes, annotée par François Di Dio, Christian Bourgois, 1990; again Poésie/Gallimard, 1999
- Un bruit de baiser ferme le monde, Unedited poems; Le Cherche-Midi, 2001
