= Pierre Seghers =

French poet

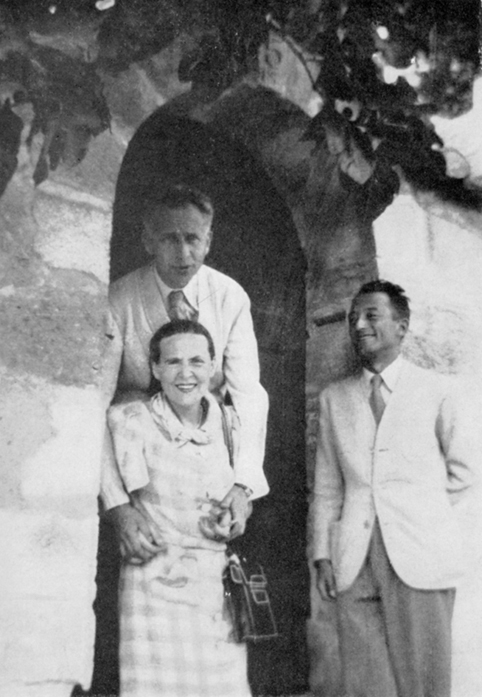
- Pierre Seghers (right) welcoming Louis Aragon and Elsa Triolet in Villeneuve-lès-Avignon in 1942
- Born: Pierre Seghers; 5 January 1906
- Died: 4 November 1987 (aged 81)

Pierre Seghers (5 January 1906, in Paris – 4 November 1987, in Créteil) was a French poet and editor. During the Second World War he took part in the French Resistance movement.

== Career ==
He founded, among other things, the famous line of books Poètes d’aujourd’hui (Contemporary poets) in 1944, which published 270 books of poets both famous and unknown (such as an anthology of modern accursed poets in 1972, Poètes maudits d'aujourd'hui: 1946-1970).

Together with François Lachenal, Paul Eluard and Jean Lescure, he gathered in 1943, the texts of many poets of the French Resistance, which he published in Les Editions de Minuit under the title: L’honneur des poètes.

Among the prizes and orders he received, he was made a commander of the Légion d'honneur and in 1976 Laureate Of The International Botev Prize.

He was doctor honoris causa of Saint Andrews University, Scotland.

He is buried at the Montparnasse Cemetery.

An exhibition on his life and work took place in the Musée du Montparnasse in Paris in 2011. A detailed catalogue was then published.

== Bibliography ==
Poetry

- Bonne-Espérance, Éditions de la Tour, 1939
- Pour les quatre saisons, Poésie 42
- Le chien de pique, Ides et Calendes, 1943
- Le domaine public Poésie 45 et Pariseau Montréal
- Jeune fille, Éditions Seghers, 1947
- Menaces de mort, La presse à bras, 1948
- Six poèmes pour Véronique, Poésie 50
- Poèmes choisis, Éditions Seghers, 1952
- Le Cœur-Volant, Les Écrivains réunis, 1954
- Racines, Interc. du Livre, 1956
- Les pierres, Interc. du Livre, 1956
- Chansons et complaintes, Tome I, illustrated by Jean Pierre Serrier, Éditions Seghers, 1959
- Chansons et complaintes, Tome II, Éditions Seghers, 1961
- Piranèse, Éditions Ides et Calendes, 1961
- Chansons et complaintes, Tome III, Éditions Seghers, 1964
- Dialogue, 1965
- Dis-moi, Ma vie, 1973
- Le Temps des merveilles, Éditions Seghers, 1978

Prose

- Richaud du Combat, A. A. M. Stols, 1944
- L'Homme du commun, Poèsie 44
- Considérations, ou Histoires sous la langue, Collection des 150
- La Résistance et ses poètes, 1940-1945, Seghers 1974
