= Janou Saint-Denis =

Canadian poet and writer (1930–2000)

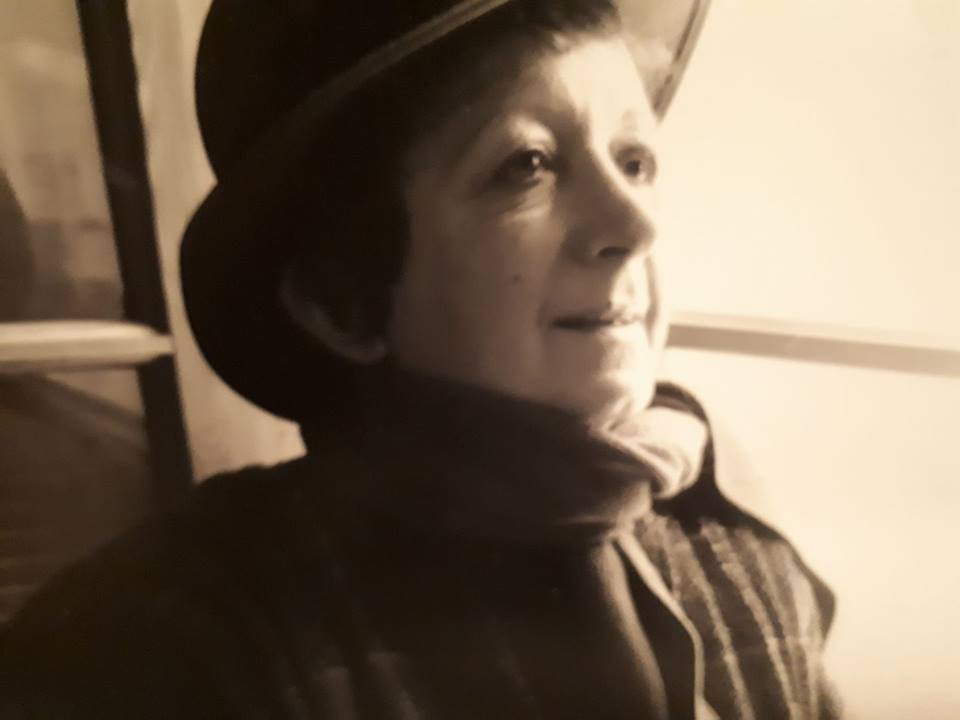
- Janou Saint-Denis, 1991
- Born: 6 May 1930; Montreal, Quebec, Canada
- Died: 11 May 2000 (aged 70)
- Resting place: Notre Dame des Neiges Cemetery
- Occupations: Poet, writer, actress, director

Janou Saint-Denis (born 6 May 1930 in Montreal – died 11 May 2000) was a Québécoise poet, essayist, actress and director.

== Biography ==
Janou Saint-Denis was born in Montreal and studied theatre at the LaSalle Conservatory and the Théâtre du Nouveau Monde workshop. In addition to theatrical productions, she worked on radio and television, including the programme Jeunesse dorée.

Saint-Denis founded the théâtre Les Satellites de Montréal in 1957 and produced works of Quebec playwrights including Claude Gauvreau and Félix Leclerc. In 1959 the theatre opened for its first public readings of poetry. In 1961 Saint-Denis received the National Award for Best Supporting Actress.

Saint-Denis left for Paris in 1961 where she remained for a decade, establishing a network of Quebec and French poets. Returning to Montreal, she founded Éditions du Soudain to hold poetry shows, notably the event Place aux Poètes held on Wednesdays starting on 5 February 1975. Saint-Denis organized and hosted this event for 26 years, held in various businesses located generally on St-Denis Street in Montreal. She also organized and hosted quatre Nuits de la poésie and co-hosted, with Michel Garneau, the National Film Board Poetry Night.

Saint-Denis published numerous poems and texts in literary magazines including: l'Atelier littéraire de la Mauricie (Trois-Rivières), Sorcières (Paris), Femmes plurielle (Ottawa), Moebius and Les Cahiers de la femme (Toronto), Canton s’met à faire de la poésie (Sherbrooke), Cahiers des arts visuels and Arcade. She was an honorary member of the Union of Quebec Writers.

The archives of Janou Saint-Denis are preserved in the Montreal archives centre of the Bibliothèque et Archives nationales du Québec (BAnQ).

== Bibliography ==
- Mots à dire - Maux à dire (in French). Montréal: Éditions du Soudain. 1972. p. 20.
- Place aux poètes (in French). Montréal: Éditions du Soudain. 1977. p. 111.
- Claude Gauvreau, Le Cygne (in French). Montréal: Les Presses de l'Université du Québec, en collaboration avec les éditions du Noroît. 1978. p. 295. ISBN 077700206X.
- Les Carnets de l'Audace
  - 1: Dollars désormais (in French). Montréal: Éditions de la Pleine Lune. 1981. p. 27. ISBN 2890240134.
  - 2: Poème à l'anti-gang et l'escouade vlimeuse (in French). Montréal: Éditions de la Pleine Lune. 1981. p. 27. ISBN 2890240142.
  - 3: Mise à part (in French). Montréal: Éditions de la Pleine Lune. 1981. p. 31. ISBN 2890240150.
- La roue du feu secret (in French). Montréal: Éditions Leméac. 1985. p. 300. ISBN 2760910253.
- Hold-up Mental (textes vivants et déplacés) (in French). Montréal: Guérin littérature. 1988. p. 126. ISBN 2760121801.
- Mémoire Innée (in French). Trois-Rivières: Écrits des Forges. 1990. p. 110. ISBN 2890461866.
  - Memoria innata (in Spanish). Zapopan, Mexico: Literalia Editores. 2006.
- Rêves éveillés (in French). Montréal: Novar. 2001.
