= Jean-Pierre Vallotton =

Jean-Pierre Vallotton (born 1955 in Geneva, Switzerland) is a French-speaking Swiss poet, writer and artist.

== Background ==
Jean-Pierre Vallotton studied literature and drama. He has participated in a number of international literature festivals including Rotterdam, Paris, Liege, Republic of Macedonia, Canada, Mexico, Australia. From 2005 to 2007, he was a lecturer at the University of Lausanne (literature and cinema). He is also a member of the Pierrette Micheloud Foundation board and president of its literary award jury.

== Writing ==
Jean-Pierre Vallotton is the author of over thirty works, including poems, short stories, criticism, children texts, artist's books and translations (Ion Caraion, Sylvia Plath, Wolfgang Borchert, R. L. Stevenson). His work has been translated into fifteen languages.

His work has been published in about fifty anthologies and more than fifty periodicals (Two Plus Two, The Mississippi Review, Cimarron, The Prose Poem, Poetry New York, The Chariton Review, Confessio, Álora, Svetová Literatura, Unu, Struga International Review of Poetry, Europe, Nouvelle Revue Française, Poésie/Seghers, PO&SIE, Le Figaro littéraire, L'Humanité). Also a collagist, he illustrated the cover of some of his books.

The bilingual anthology "Wings Folded in Cracks", English translation and foreword by Antonio D'Alfonso, was published by Guernica (Toronto) in 2013 ("Essential Translations Series" 14).

== Awards ==
Winner of several prizes : Hermann Ganz de la Société Suisse des Ecrivains, Unimuse (Belgium), Louise Labé (Paris), de la Ville de Lancy, Poncetton de la Société des Gens de Lettres de France (Paris). What critics have said about Jean-Pierre Vallotton's poetry: "With neither complaint nor joy – uncompromising words." (Constuire) "A perfect and elegant writing that softly sings about love." (Arpa) "His poetry book traces a need for deep communion, for transcendental essence, the light of which is a symbol closest to the absolute." (Rétro-Viseur) "Profusion and sobriety converge in this pursuit of a learned language of poetry." (Le Courrier de l 'Escaut) "Here is poetry, vibrantly so. the divine breathe of inspiration transcends anguish, and opens to new life." (Lettres et Cultures de Langue Française) "Poetry opening to all horizons, to duration, and essentially to what is presence." (Le Journal des Poètes) "More than the macroscopic of the surreal, Jean-Pierre Vallotton explores the microscopic of hyperreality. In fact, if there is one single element in this complex poetry that stands out, it is precisely the absence of anything obvious. Yet his idiosyncratic poetic structure never disrupts its symbolic density. Behind the irregularity of forms, there is recurrence, tempo, permanency of pursuit. Where other poets of his generation developed strategies of deconstruction, Vallotton invented a brave new mosaic with the parameters left behind by traditionalism, modernism and postmodernism. If William Wordsworth, Oscar Wilde, T.S. Eliot are considered decadent, then so is Jean-Pierre Vallotton a decadent, however, the sort of decadent that will be viewed as being great in years to come: the space between us is a path of magnificence, and here the faintest of our footsteps draws forth a flower. His neo-baroque poetry stands at the crossroads of whatever styles, forms, and contents led to this spot; and it is with the pernicious artefacts found here that Jean-Pierre Vallotton invents the unknown structures that will welcome the birds of paradise of tomorrow." (Antonio D’Alfonso, in Wings Folded in Cracks)
