= Adolphe van Bever =

French bibliographer and erudite

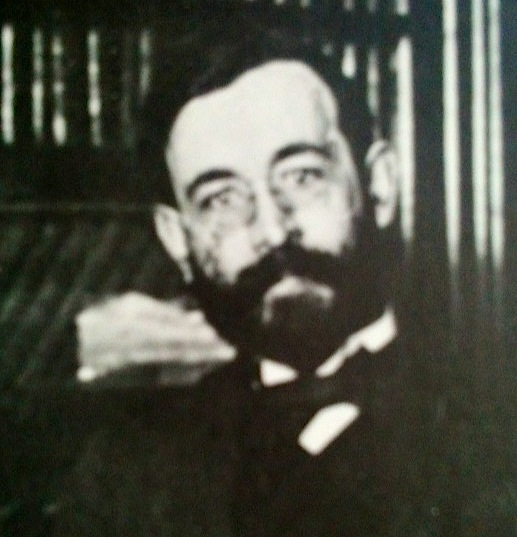
Adolphe van Bever (1900).

Adolphe van Bever (25 December 1871, 12th arrondissement of Paris – 7 January 1927, Paris) was a 19th–20th-century French bibliographer and erudite.

== Biography ==
Born in a poor family, he nevertheless one day discovered a passion for science and the rigorous methods of the Chartists. At eighteen, he became secretary of the Théâtre de l'Œuvre, and afterwards held the same position at the Mercure de France between 1897 and 1912. Thus, he devoted himself to his scholarly work. He also shared with his friend Paul Léautaud a passion for poetry that would lead them to the joint publication of their famous anthology Poètes d’aujourd'hui (1880–1900), first published in 1900 and reprinted many times.

Suffering from a painful disease of syphilitic origin, the tabes dorsalis, he overcame his physical miseries to concentrate on his work. Van Bever was primarily engaged in the critical edition of the satiric, libertine and gallant poets and writers, but also addressed, through a series of regional anthologies, the oral folklore of the French provinces, in collaboration with Arnold van Gennep. He also played an important role in the collection "Maîtres du livre" by the publisher Georges Crès in which he published critical editions of Verlaine, Baudelaire, Ronsard and Rousseau. He helped Léon Bloy publish Le Désespéré ("Despairing").

When his name began to be well-known, however, the tabes he suffered from worsened and turned his life into martyrdom.

He died prematurely at the age of fifty-five in his Paris home of rue de Tournon after having published nearly one hundred books. His eulogy holds entirely in the words spoken by Maurice Renard on his grave in the cemetery of Grosrouvre: "Be good and suffer. Work and suffer"

== Works ==
- Contes de poupées, 1897.
- Poètes d’aujourd’hui, morceaux choisis accompagnés de notices biographiques et d’un essai de bibliographie…, 3 t., Mercure de France, Paris, 1900 (many editions, some illustrated); published in collaboration with Paul Léautaud.
  - Tome 1 : Henri Barbusse, Henri Bataille, Tristan Corbière, Lucie Delarue-Mardrus – Émile Despax – Max Elskamp – André Fontainas – Paul Fort – René Ghil – Remy de Gourmont – Fernand Gregh – Charles Guérin – André-Ferdinand Hérold – Gérard d'Houville – Francis Jammes – Gustave Kahn – Tristan Klingsor – Jules Laforgue – Léo Larguier – Raymond de la Tailhède – Louis Le Cardonnel – Sébastien-Charles Leconte – Grégoire Leroy – Jean Lorrain – Pierre Louÿs – Maurice Maeterlinck – Maurice Magre – Stéphane Mallarmé.
  - Tome 2 : Louis Mandin – Camille Mauclair – Stuart Merrill – Éphraïm Mikhaël – Albert Mockel – Robert de Montesquiou – Jean Moréas – Comtesse Mathieu de Noailles – Pierre Quillard – etc.
  - Tome 3 : François Porché – Pierre Quillard – Ernest Raynaud – Henri de Régnier – Adolphe Retté – Arthur Rimbaud – Georges Rodenbach – Paul-Napoléon Roinard – Jules Romains – Saint-Pol-Roux – André Salmon – Albert Samain – Cécile Sauvage – Fernand Severin – Emmanuel Signoret – Paul Souchon – Henry Spiess – André Spire – Laurent Tailhade – Touny-Lérys – Paul Valéry – Charles Van Lerberghe – Émile Verhaeren – Paul Verlaine – Francis Vielé-Griffin.
- Les poètes satyriques des XVIe et XVIIe, 1903.
- Le Colporteur par François-Antoine Chevrier. Réimprimé sur l’édition publiée à Londres, en 1762, avec une préface, des notes, des documents inédits et suivi d'un supplément, Bibliothèque des Curieux, Paris, 1904.
- Maurice Maeterlinck, 1904.
- Les conteurs libertins du XVIIIe, 1904.
- Sonnets gaillards et priapiques, par un bibliophile inconnu, 1906.
- Contes & conteurs gaillards au XVIIIe, 1906.
- Le livre des rondeaux galants et satyriques du XVIIe, 1906.
- Œuvres poétiques du sieur de Dalibray avec une notice sur un poète de cabaret au XVIIe siècle, des notes historiques et critiques et des pièces justificatives, E. Santot, coll. « Poètes d’autrefois », Paris, 1906.
- Œuvres galantes des conteurs italiens, 1907, 4e éd.
- La Fleur de poésie françoyse, 1909.
- Les poètes du terroir. Du XVe au XXe siècle, C. Delagrave, Paris, 4 vol., 1909-11
- Contes et facéties galantes du XVIIIe, 1910.
- La Bourgogne vue par les écrivains et les artistes, coll. « la France pittoresque et artistique », Société des Éditions Louis-Michaud, Paris, 1913.
- La Touraine vue par les écrivains et les artistes, coll. « la France pittoresque et artistique », Société des Éditions Louis-Michaud, Paris, 1914.
- La Normandie vue par les écrivains et les artistes, coll. « la France pittoresque et artistique », Société des Éditions Louis-Michaud, Paris, 19….
- Anthologie littéraire de l’Alsace et de la Lorraine, XIIe-XXe, 1920.
- Le Cahier vert, journal intime, 1832–1835, Maurice de Guérin's diary, reworked edition from the manuscripts od G.-S. Trébutien and published with notes and clarifications by Adolphe van Bever, 1921.
- Bibliographie et iconographie de Paul Verlaine, publiées d’après des documents inédits, 1926.

== Sources ==
- Notice on Gallica.
- Léon Deffoux, notice nécrologique, in L'Ami du lettré. Année littéraire & artistique pour 1928, Grasset, 1928, p. 170-171.

== Bibliography ==
- Edmond Rocher, Adolphe van Bever, G. Crès, Paris, 1911.
- Paul Léautaud, Adolphe van Bever, Impr. F. Paillart, Abbeville, 1927.
- Ch. Bosse, Catalogue de la bibliothèque : livres anciens et modernes, éditions originales d'auteurs contemporains, la plupart avec dédicace autographe, réimpressions d'auteurs classiques, livres illustrés, poétes du terroir, epistoliers, histoire littéraire, beaux-arts, mémoires, bibliographie de M. Ad. van Bever, L. Giraud-Badin, Paris, 1927.
- Valentina Gosetti, "Poetry Anthologists as Translingual Mediators: The Example of Adolphe van Bever's Les poètes du terroir", L'Esprit Créateur 59, no. 4 (2019): 40-53.
