= Paul-Napoléon Roinard =

French poet (1856–1930)

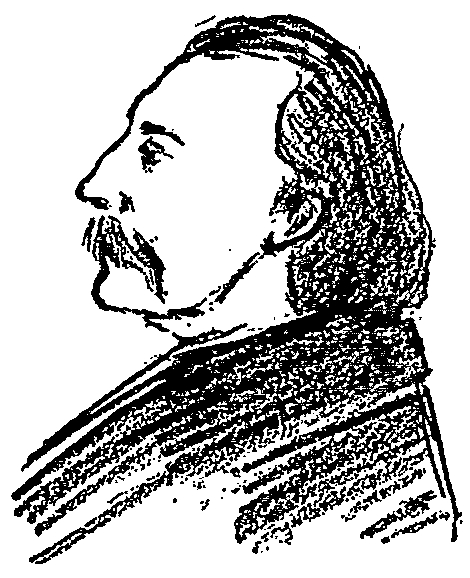
- Paul-Napoléon Roinard par Albert Brière.
- Born: 4 February 1856; Neufchâtel-en-Bray, France
- Died: 26 October 1930 (aged 74); Courbevoie, France
- Occupation: Poet

Paul-Napoléon Roinard (4 February 1856 – 26 October 1930) was a French anarchist poet.

== Works ==
- Nos plaies, poésies, cover drawn by the author, Paris, Soc. typographique, 1886, in-18;
- Chanson d’Amour, poetry, music by Louis Hesse. Paris, Durdilly. s. d., en feuille;
- Six étages, récit en vers, Paris, Ed. Girard, s. d., en feuille;
- Berceuse, poetry, s. 1. n. d. [Paris, Ed. Girard], 2 ff., la couverture sert de titre (50 exempl.).
- À Dieu, s’il existe, Paris, chez l’auteur, 7, rue Pixérécourt, s. d., en feuille,;
- La Mort du Rêve, poems, Paris, Soc. du Mercure de France, 1902, in-8°;
- Sur l’Avenue sans fin, poem, Paris et Reims, Revue de Paris et de Champagne (et chez l’auteur), 1906, in-8°.
- Portraits du prochain siècle (1894);
- La Poésie symboliste. Trois entretiens sur les temps héroïques, période symboliste, au Salon des artistes indépendants, 1908. Nos maîtres et nos morts, par P.-N. Roinard. Les Survivants, par Victor-Émile Michelet. La Phalange nouvelle, par Guillaume Apollinaire (1908);
- Les Miroirs, moralité lyrique en cinq phases, huit stades, sept gloses et en vers, Éd. de « la Phalange », 1908;
- La Légende rouge, synthèse d'idées et de caractères révolutionnaires, suivi d'un débat sur Le nombre et la rime et d'un ballet-mimodrame, La Ronde des fleurs (1921);
- Chercheurs d'impossible. Contre-partie du Donneur d'illusions, féerie tragique, 5 acts, 11 tableaux, in verse, 1929.

== Prefaces and notices ==
- Portraits du prochain siècle, Paris, Girard, 1894, in-18.
- Œuvres posthumes de Paul Audricourt. Paris, Mouillot, 1902, in-18;
- Soirée d’Art social. Programme illustré par Deluermoz.

== Sources ==
- Adolphe van Bever, Paul Léautaud, Poètes d'aujourd'hui, t. 2 Paris, Mercure de France, 1908, (p. 178-82)
- L'Éphéméride anarchiste : notice biographique.

== Bibliography ==
- Léon Bloy, Léon Bloy devant les cochons, Paris, Chamuel, 1894, in-18;
- Léon Bloy, Le Mendiant ingrat, Bruxelles, Deman, 1898, in-18;
- Léon Bocquet, « P.-N. Roinard », Le Beffroi (Lille), octobre 1902;
- Jean Court, Le Cantique des Cantiques au Théâtre d’Art, Mercure de France, janvier 1892;
- Georges Docquois, Le Congrès des Poètes, Paris, Bibliothèque artistique et littéraire, 1894, in-16;
- Félicien Fagus, « P.-N. Roinard », La Revue des Beaux-Arts et des Lettres, 1 May 1899; Sur le même, La Revue Blanche, 1 November 1902.
- A.-M. Gossez, Poètes du Nord. 1880-190S, morceaux choisis, accompagnés d’un essai bio-bibliographique, etc., Paris, Ollendorff, 1902, in-18.
- Julien Leclercq, « Roinard », notice dans les Portraits du prochain siècle, Paris, Girard, 1894, in-18;
- M.-C. Poinsot, Anthologie des poètes normands contemporains (Portraits de P.-N. Roinard), Paris, Floury, s. d., in-16.
- Anonyme, « Banquet à Roinard » La Plume, 15 juin 1902;
- Anonyme, Échos. Les Fêtes Cornéliennes de Rouen, Mercure de France, juillet 1904;

== Iconography ==
- Louis Anquetin: oil portrait, 1885 (belongs to M. Roinard); oil portrait in [Exposition des Portraits du prochain siècle, chez Le Barc de Boutteville, 1893] (belongs to M. Roinard), reprod. in la Revue Encyclopédique, 15 November 1893;
- A. Brière, « Croquis », La Plume, 15 June 1892;
- F. Courché: Dessin à la plume, reprod. in le Messager Parisien, 1888.
