= Victor Segalen =

French doctor, ethnographer, and writer (1879–1919)

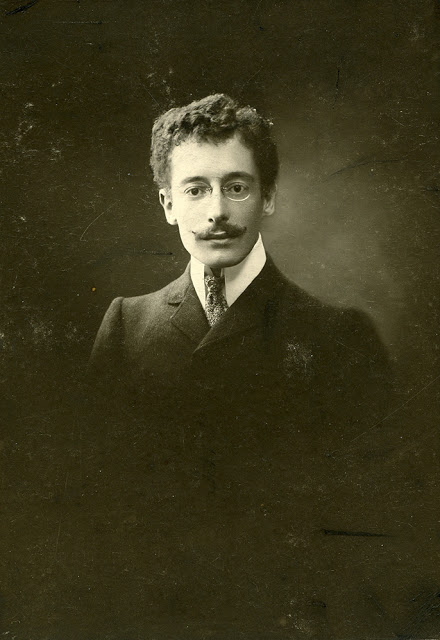
Victor Segalen in Nouméa (1904), by Louis Talbot (1853–?)

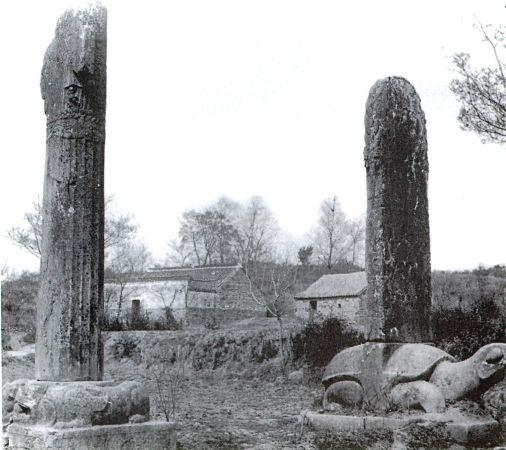
Segalen's photo of statuary near Xiao Xiu's tomb (1917)

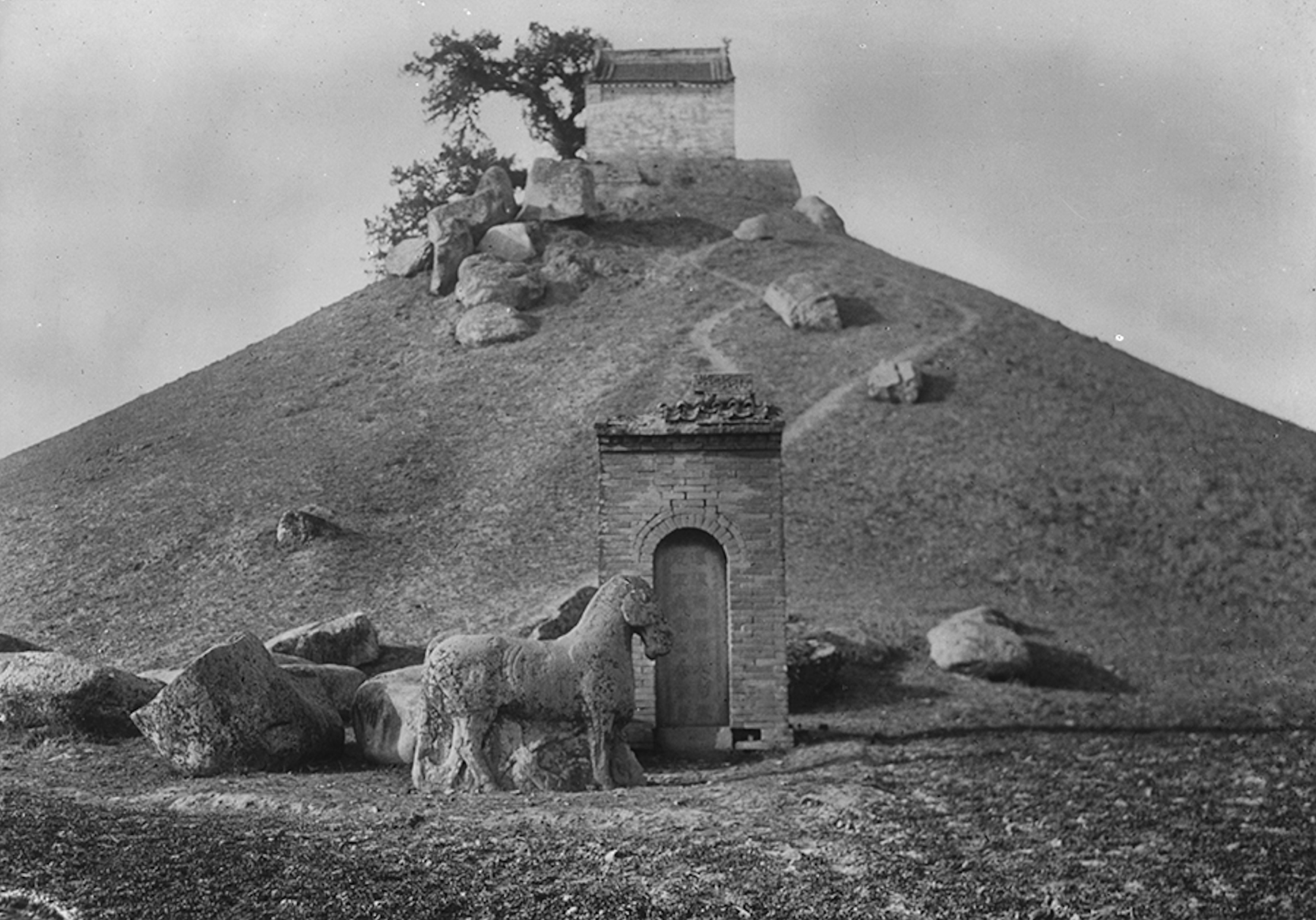
Tomb of Huo Qubing in 1914, Shaanxi, China, photographed by Victor Segalen.

Victor Segalen (14 January 1878 – 21 May 1919) was a French naval doctor, ethnographer, archeologist, writer, poet, explorer, art-theorist, linguist and literary critic.

He was born in Brest. He studied medicine and graduated at the Navy School of medicine ('Santé Navale') in Bordeaux. He traveled and lived in Polynesia (1903–1905) and China (1909–1914 and 1917). He died by accident in a forest in Huelgoat, Northern Brittany, France ("under mysterious circumstances") and reputedly with an open copy of Hamlet by his side.

== Legacy ==
In 1934, the French state inscribed his name on the walls of the Panthéon because of his sacrifice for his country during World War I.

He gave his name to the Victor Segalen Bordeaux 2 University of medicine, literature and social sciences in Bordeaux under the Academy of Bordeaux, and to the Faculty of Arts and Social Sciences of Brest where he was born, and the French International School of Hong Kong.

Some western scholars of Chinese art, starting with Victor Segalen, use the word "chimera" generically to refer to winged leonine or mixed species quadrupeds, such as bixie, tianlu, and even qilin.

== Personal life ==
Victor Segalen married on June 2, 1905 in Brest to Yvonne Hébert (1884-1963), with whom he had three children: Yvon (1906), Annie (1912) and Ronan (1913).

== Works ==
- L'observation médicale chez les écrivains naturalistes, thesis, Bordeaux, 1902 (document électronique).
- Les Synesthésies et l'école symboliste, 1902. Translated into English with In A Sound World by M. Roux & R.W.M Hunt, Strange Attractor Press, 2021.
- Vers les sinistrés, 1903.
- Gauguin dans son dernier décor, 1904.
- Le Double Rimbaud, 1906.
- Dans un monde sonore, 1907. Translated into English as In A Sound World by M.Roux & R.W.M Hunt, Strange Attractor Press, 2021.
- Voix mortes : musique maori, 1907.
- Les Immémoriaux (under the pseudonym Max Anély), 1907. Translated into English as A Lapse of Memory by Rosemary Arnoux, Boombana Publications, 1995.
- Stèles, 1912; new edition, presented by Simon Leys, Éditions de la Différence, coll. " Orphée ", Paris, 1989. Read online. Translated into English by Nathaniel Tarn as Stelae, Unicorn Press, 1969, later by A. Harvey & I. Watson, Jonathan Cape, 1990, and again by T. Billings & C. Bush, Wesleyan University Press, 2007. Read online
- Peintures, Chez Georges Crès et Cie, 1916. Translated into English as Paintings by Andrew Harvey and Iain Watson, Quartet Books, 1991.
- Hommage à Gauguin, 1918.

Posthumous publications :

- Thibet (publié partiellement en 1963 puis intégralement en 1979).
- Le Siège de l'Âme, 1921.
- Orphée-Roi, 1921. Translated into English with In A Sound World by M.Roux & R.W.M Hunt, Strange Attractor Press, 2021.
- René Leys, 1922. Translated into English by J.A. Underwood, New York Review of Books, 2003.
- Mission archéologique en Chine (in collaboration with Gilbert de Voisins and Jean Lartigue), 1923–1924.
- Odes, 1926.
- Équipée. De Pékin aux marches tibétaines…, 1929. Translated into English as Journey to the Land of the Real by N. Lehrer, Atlas Press, 2016.
- Voyage au pays du réel, 1929.
- Lettres de Chine, 1967.
- La Grande Statuaire chinoise Archived 19 March 2011 at the Wayback Machine, suivi de Les origines de la grande statuaire en Chine 1972. Translated into English as The great statuary of China by E Levieux, University of Chicago Press, 1978
- A Dreuz an Arvor, 1973.
- Siddhârtha, 1974.
- Briques et Tuiles, Fata Morgana, 1975.
- Journal des îles, 1978.
- Essai sur l'exotisme, Fata Morgana, 1978. Translated as Essay on Exoticism: An Aesthetics of Diversity by Y.R. Schlick, Duke University Press, 2002.
- Le Fils du ciel : chronique des jours souverains, 1985.
- Essai sur soi-même, 1986.
- Dossier pour une Fondation Sinologique, Rougerie, 1986.
- Journal de voyage, 1995.
- Le Maître-du-Jouir, 1995.
- La marche du feu, 1995.
- Pensers païens, 1995.
- Hommage à Saint-Pol-Roux, 1995.
- Entretiens avec Debussy, 1995.
- Gustave Moreau, maître imagier de l'orphisme, 1995.
- Quelques musées par le monde, 1995.
- Essai sur le mystérieux, 1995.
- Imaginaires, 1995.
- Un grand fleuve, 1995, préface de Jean Esponde, éd. Atelier de l'agneau, 2006.
- Briques et tuiles, 1995.
- Feuilles de route, 1995.
- Correspondance, 2004 (compilation dirigée par Henry Bouillier et Annie Joly-Segalen)
- Les Marquises, extrait de Journal des Îles, suivi de Cyclone dans les îles Tuamotu, préface de Jean Esponde, éd. Atelier de l'agneau, 2011.

Archaeological missions :

- Rapport de la Mission archéologique Victor Segalen, 1917
- Le tombeau du fils du roi de Wou – Ve siècle avant notre ère, 1922
- Rapport de la Mission archéologique en Lartigue, Segalen et de Voisins, 1923–1924
- Chine, la grande statuaire, suivi de Les origines de la statuaire de Chine (publiée en 1972)

== Works about Segalen ==
- Henry Bouillier: Victor Segalen (Mercure de France, 1961)
- Gilles Manceron: Segalen
- Yvonne Y. Hsieh: Victor Segalen's Literary Encounter with China: Chinese Moulds, Western Thoughts (University of Toronto Press, 1988)
- Charles Forsdick: Victor Segalen and the Aesthetics of Diversity (Oxford University Press, 2000)
- Wang Tao and Denis Thouard, "Making New Classics: The Archaeology of Luo Zhenyu and Victor Segalen", in S. Humphreys and R. Wagner (eds), Modernity's Classics. Transcultural Research – Heidelberg Studies on Asia and Europe in a Global Context (Springer: Berlin, Heidelberg, 2013)
