= Lartigue =

Lartigue can refer to:

- The Lartigue Monorail system, invented by the French engineer Charles Lartigue (1834–1907)
- Lartigue, Gers, a commune in the Gers département in France
- Lartigue, Gironde, a commune in the Gironde département in France
- Jacques Henri Lartigue (1894–1986), French photographer and painter
- Jean Lartigue (1886 –1940), French admiral
- Jean-Jacques Lartigue, a Montreal bishop who opposed the Patriotes
