= Academy Study of a Man =

Painting by Henri Matisse

Academy Study of a Man (French: Académie d'homme) is an oil on canvas painting by French artist Henri Matisse, from c. 1900–1901. It depicts a standing nude man, with his head slightly raised upwards. The canvas was bought by the city of Marseille at auction on 20 March 1990 and since then has been in the Musée Cantini.

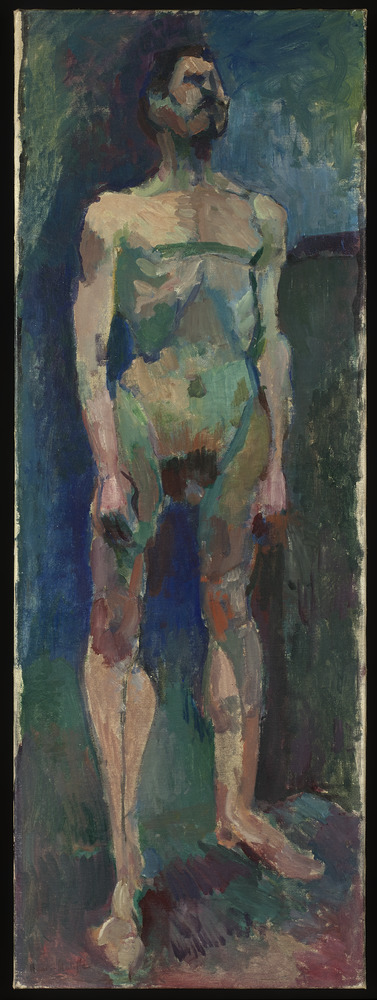
Academy Study of a Man, Henri Matisse, 1900–1901
