= The Expeditionary Corps Embarks for Minorca at the Port of Marseille Under the Command of Marshal de Richelieu =

1756 painting by Jean-Joseph Kapeller

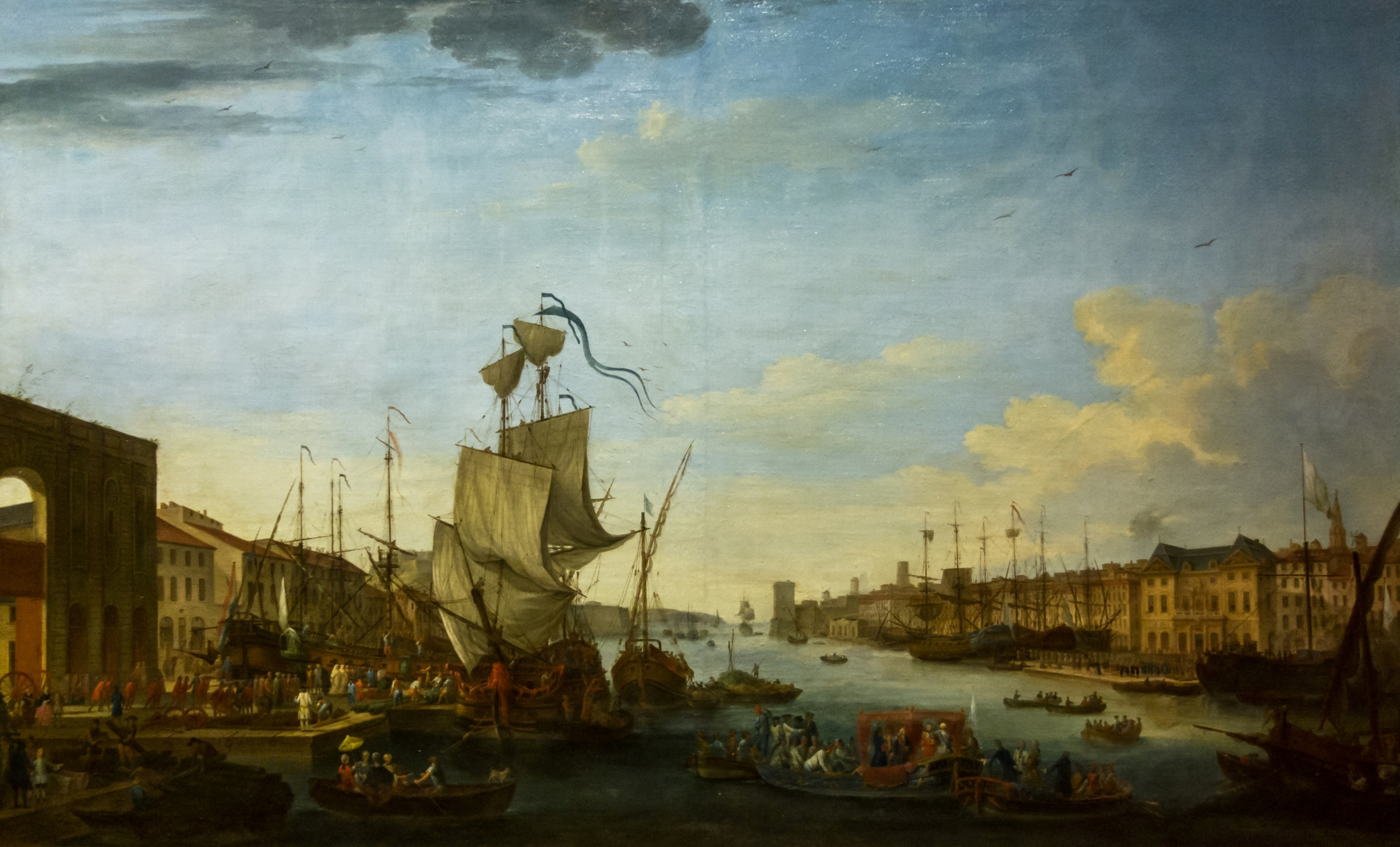
The Expeditionary Corps Embarks for Minorca at the Port of Marseille Under the Command of Marshal de Richelieu (1756) by Jean-Joseph Kapeller

The Expeditionary Corps Embarks for Minorca at the Port of Marseille Under the Command of Marshal de Richelieu is a major oil on canvas painting by Jean-Joseph Kapeller, signed and dated 26 March 1756. It was acquired by the French state in 1941 and assigned to musée Cantini in Marseille.

It was first exhibited on 29 August 1756 in the 'salle du Modèle' at the Académie de peinture de Marseille with the title The Port of Marseille and the Embarkation of War Munitions and Shot for the Expedition to the Island of Minorca, by Order and in the Presence of Monsieur the Marshal de Richelieu.

== Historical Context ==
The Duke of Richelieu and Fronsac, Cardinal Richelieu's great-grandnephew, left Paris on 18 March 1756, hoping to find everything underway in Marseille. He was badly disappointed - the troops had still not been concentrated in Marseille, whilst there were no supplies and no transport ships in a fit state to go to sea. On 22 March he gave orders at Marseille and the following day headed for Toulon, leaving the chevalier de Redmond and Monsieurs de Luppé and de Retz to continue preparations at Marseille.

The painting shows de Richelieu setting out for the Battle of Minorca, a land and sea battle between France and Britain in May–June 1756 early in the Seven Years' War over control of Minorca and the western Mediterranean Sea. The naval element on 20 May between a force under de Richelieu's cousin La Galissonière and one led by John Byng allowed France to hold the island until the end of the war.

Related works
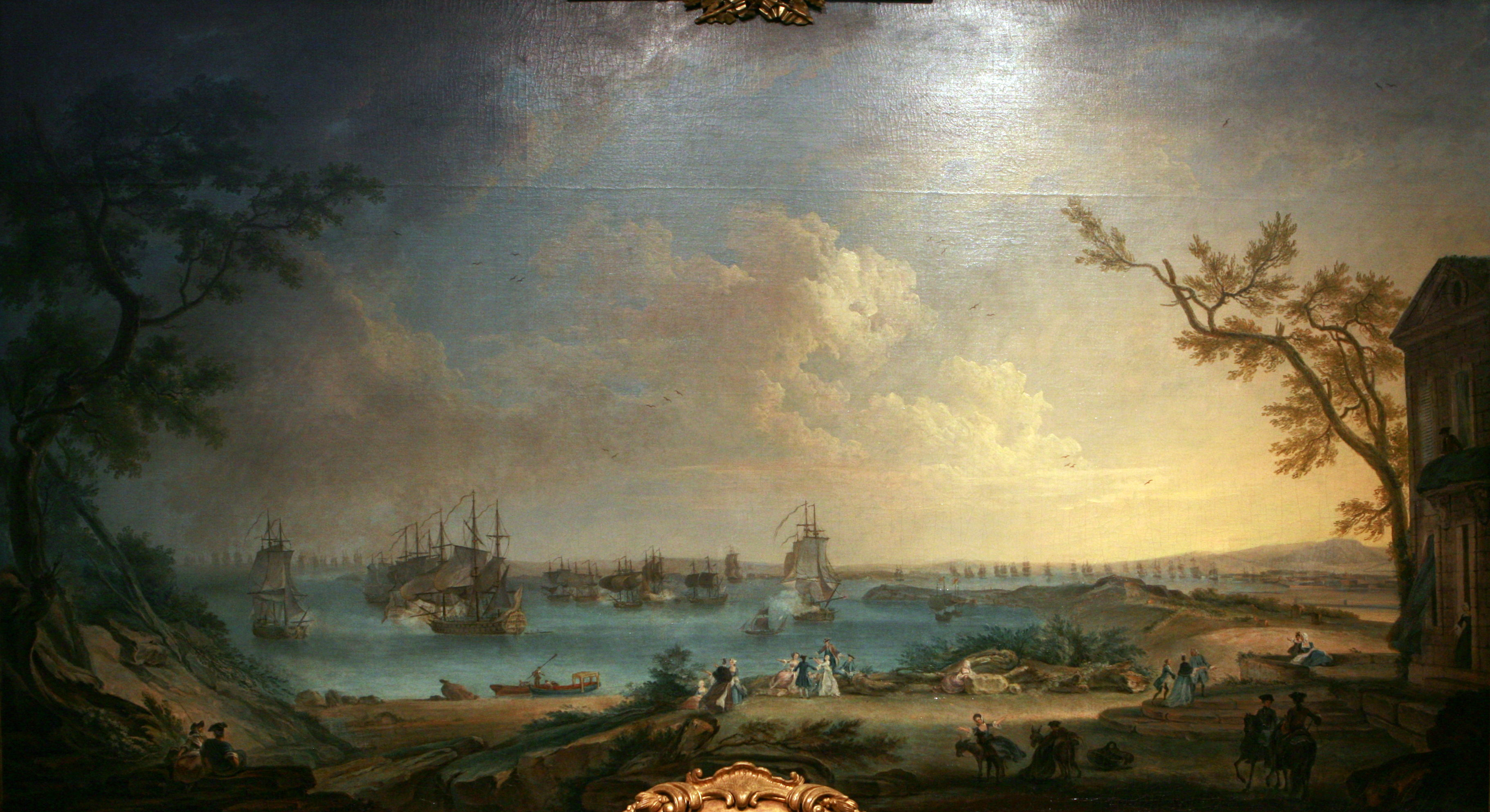
The Expedition to Minorca Leaves on 10 April 1756 by Nicolas Ozanne.

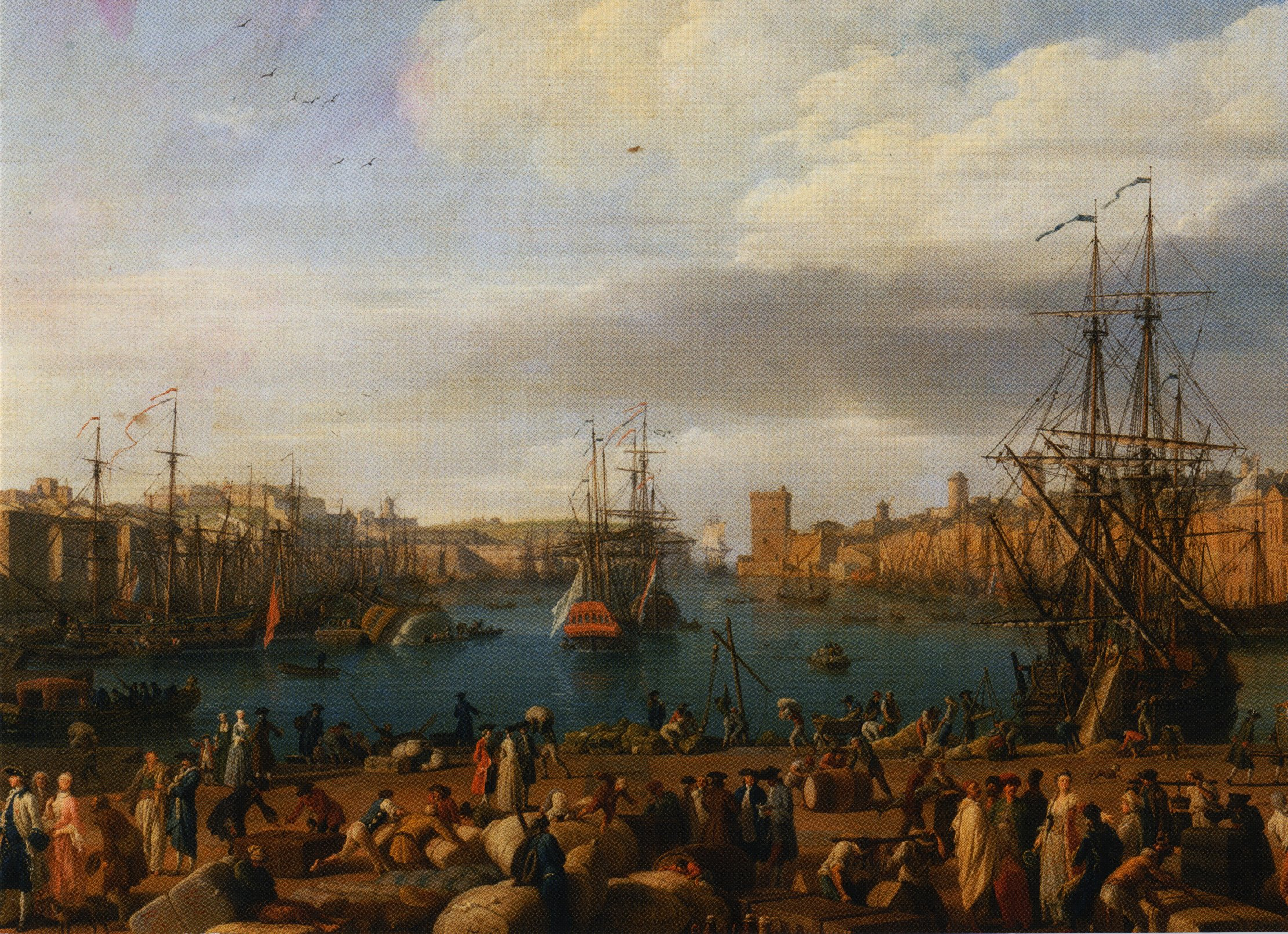
Inside the Port of Marseille, 1754, by Claude Joseph Vernet (Musée de la Marine) (Note: Shows the Old Port at Marseille seen from the Canebière. In the Paris Salon catalogue of 1755 it stated that it showed "how it is in this port which has the greatest commerce with the Levant, the artist enriched this painting with figures from different nations from the different nations of the 'Échelles du Levant', Barbary, Africa and other areas. It gathers what characterises a merchant port with very wide trading networks.")

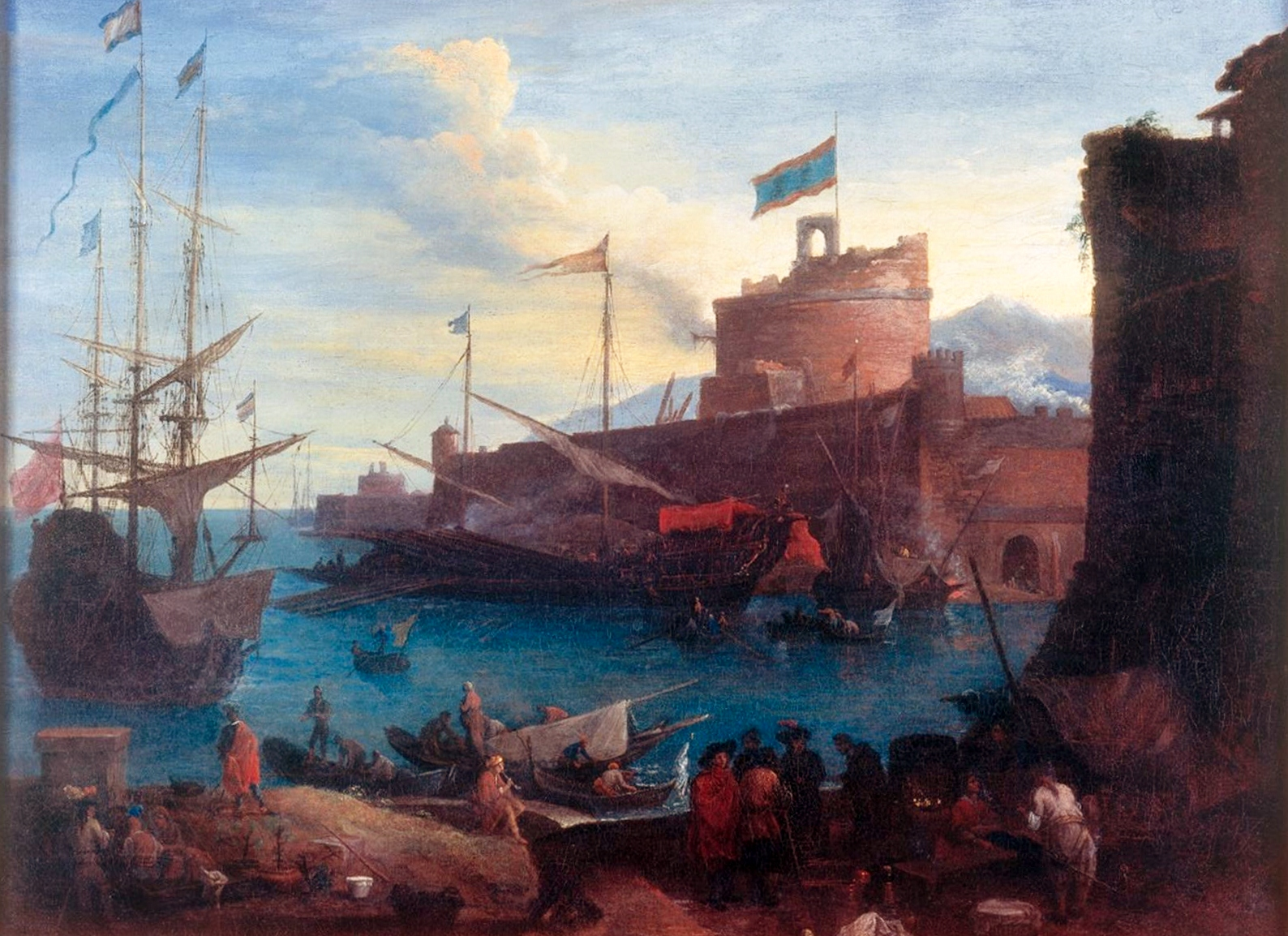
Mediterranean Port Scene, 1625–1650, by Jean-Baptiste de La Rose.
