= Simon Simon-Auguste =

French painter (1909–1987)

Simon Joseph Simon-Auguste
- Born: April 20, 1909; Bouches-du-Rhône, Aix-en-Provence
- Died: 1987 (aged 77–78); Roanne
- Known for: Paintings and Illustrations

Simon Joseph Simon-Auguste (20 April 1909 – May, 1987) was a French artist, known for his intimate paintings, mainly portraits, nudes, and still lifes. His production is characterized by a calm, intimate feel and the effective use of glaze. (Note: Olivier Le Bihan, Bernard Rossignon, Jean-Pierre Bourreux, Raymond Buttner collectionneur, Donation Jeanne Buttner au musée d'Art moderne de Troyes, Milan, SilvanaEditoriale, 2012.)

== Early years ==
Born in Marseille, Simon-Auguste was the son of Antonin Auguste, a cabinet maker specialized in restoring furniture in the chateaux of the Provence. His mother, Antoinette Rossage, was originally from the Savoie, France. The couple had many children.

Simon studied at the École communale at rue Eydoux, in his neighbourhood in Marseille, where he excelled in design.

In 1923, he started working in the Clérissy ceramic factory in Saint-Jean-du-Désert as an interior designer trainee. He later worked painting religious statues and making dolls at a workshop. He combined these various jobs with evening classes at the Marseille school of fine arts, where the director was Henri Brémond. (Note: The classes ran between 13 and 15 hours and from 18 to 20 hours.)

In 1929, Simon-Auguste was encouraged to pursue singing at the Music Conservatory under Figarella. This only lasted a year. Also in 1929, he was exempted from military service due to his bad health.

== Life In Marseille ==
In 1931, Simon-Auguste finished his studies at the École des Beaux-Arts and won the Stanislas-Torrents award. He was commissioned to execute the mural decorations of the town hall in Allauch. He began exhibiting in Marseille where doctors and lawyers purchased his paintings.

In 1932, he invested into a 6-month stay in Paris, where he frequented the Louvre Museum and became specially interested in the Camondo Collection. At the invitation of art dealer Adolphe Basler, he took part in the Moins de trente ans exhibition, at the Galerie de Sèvres, along with Jacques Despierre, André Hambourg, Louis Dideron, Léon Couturier, among others. He presented a nude, a still life, and a view of the Jardin du Luxembourg. He also started dealing with Georges Petit and the Galerie Vildrac.

In 1933, Simon-Auguste had his first solo exhibition at the Galerie Detailles, at the Canebière in Marseille which contributed to his success. He displayed 40 pieces (paintings, watercolours, and sketches), mostly nudes and genre scenes.

In 1934, he married a philosophy student who would become a journalist under the pseudonym of Michele Seurière. For his second solo exhibition at the Galerie Detailles, a few landscapes and marines were added to his portfolio.

In 1936, he helped illustrate Les Taches d’Encre, by Léon Cadenel, (Note: (1903–1985)) with an ink design of a Provençal landscape.

In 1937, he painted a panel of 250 cm × 80 cm (98 in × 31 in) for the École d’Istres, the title being "Les Salins-de-Giraud", and five other panels (three of 3 m × 2 m (9.8 ft × 6.6 ft) and two of 2 m × 1 m (6.6 ft × 3.3 ft)) for the Château-Gombert school about "Les jeux des enfants" (children's games).

== World War II ==
During the 1930s Simon-Auguste explored subjects around nudes and landscapes. Later these evolved into children, still lifes and locals, full of intimacy and simplicity, which gained him a lot of recognition. Among these, we find La fillette au bol and Tête d'Enfant, which were purchased by the Musée Longchamp, Marseille.

Finally, in 1939, he could afford to move to Paris. The family settled at 38 rue de Malte and Simon-Auguste started submitting his work to the Salon d'Automne, Salon des Peintres Témoins de Leur Temps, and other major exhibitions.

At the outbreak of World War II, he was on holiday in Auvergne. In 1940, he was mobilized. Within two months, he had to retreat to Ussel, forced by his ill health; and, in 1941, he reconverted a rented farm there into his atelier.

== Life In Post World War II Paris ==
Simon-Auguste returned to Paris after the Liberation in 1944, to take part for the first time in the Nationale with La Fillette aux Pommes.

Up to 1947 Simon-Auguste signed his paintings with fountain pen ink. Afterwards, he used brush oil. In general, he tended to sign on the lower right corner.

He spent some Summer holidays in Villiers-sur-Morin in the late 1940s. In 1949, he traveled around Italy: Rome, Florence, Siena, San-Giminiano, Venice, Milan.

In 1950, he was appointed member at the Salon d’Automne. This year he submitted Le Café du Commerce to the Grand Prix de la Peinture Contemporaine, at the Marsan Pavilion (Louvre Museum). He was amongst the 100 painters selected by the jury.

Also in 1950, the city of Paris acquired his Marine de La Rochelle. The Musée du Château de Sceaux acquired Paysage de l'Ille-de-France. The French state acquired La Fillette à la lampe in 1952, Nature morte aux Bleuets in 1953, and Comme un Poisson dans l’Eau in 1955.

In 1951, he contributed to an itinerant exhibition around Switzerland (Bern, Lausanne and Geneva) about Les fleurs et les fruits.

He produced a portrait of French writer and critic Paul Léautaud in 1956.

Simon-Auguste died in Roanne in May, 1987.

His works can be found in private collections and museums, such as the Musée des Beaux-Arts de Marseille, the Musée Cantini in Marseille, the Musée Carnavalet in Paris, and Musée d'Art Moderne de Paris.

== Reviews ==
- Journalist Micheline Sandrel in Lettres et Médecins:

“You teach us to see better what lies around us, Simon-Auguste, for you instruct us in silence and its harmonies, and in that tenderness, which resembles silence.”

- Painter and art critic Raymond Charmet in Arts Magazine:

“Simon-Auguste’s work strikes by the unity and stylistic mastery which this intelligent and strong-willed painter has succeeded in achieving. The major problems of art are approached and resolved with remarkable determination: that of composition, clear and rigorous; that of line, clean and pure, as in the work of the Primitives; that of color, at once striking in its vibrant blues and subtlety refined, harmonized.”

- French art critic, journalist, and art historian Raymond Cogniat in Le Figaro:

“...The moving sensitivity of this artist. In blue surroundings, female subjects depicted in peaceful colors assume attitudes of calm and repose; an art of silence and meditation whose delicacy is very winning.”

== Quotes ==
“I love silence and the sweetness of the daily routine, the simple language of familiar objects, the profound individual glory, the quiet enthusiasm of meditation.”

“I want to escape the modern myth of cosmos, the geometry of the arbitrary and the factual, to translate the balance, density, purity and tenderness of the human figure, its delicate shapes, and to draw this inner world deeper than interstellar spaces.”

== Paintings ==
- 1951 Paysage près de Villiers-sur-Morin, oil on canvas 81 cm × 100 cm (32 in × 39 in), Musée du Domaine départemental de Sceaux.
- 1956 Portrait of Paul Léautaud (1872–1956), writer, at his house in de Fontenay-aux-Roses, oil on canvas 89 cm × 116.5 cm (35.0 in × 45.9 in), Musée Carnavalet.
- Nature morte aux poires
- L'écoliere
- Fleurs variées
- Fillette à l'ardoise
- La partie de carte
- Le modèle
- Fille au bouquet
- Nu
- Fleurs des champs
- Le rendez-vous

== Exhibitions ==
- 1933 Galerie Detailles, Marseille.
- 1935 Galerie du Radeau, quai de Rive-Neuve, Marseille (with Moïse Kisling, Jacques Thevenet and Auguste Chabaud).
- 1936 he presented drawings and gouaches at the Galerie du Cours-Mirabeau, in Aix-en-Provence.
- 1938 Galerie Ymo, Marseille, where he presented 25 paintings and 5 drawings (nudes, flowers, and landscapes).
- 1941 & 1943 Galerie Camus, Avenue Blatin, in Clearmont-Ferrand.
- 1945 Galerie Lhote, La Rochelle (30 pieces).
- 1945 Nationale, Paris, with “Femme se coiffant”.
- 1946 Salon des Artistes Indépendants with “Tête d’Enfant” and “Nu sur un Canapé”.
- 1947 Salon d’Automne, Paris.
- 1948 Salon des Tuileries, Paris.
- 1948 Galerie Bénézit, Boulevard Haussmann, Paris, his first solo exhibition in Paris.
- 1948 Galerie Lhote, in La Rochelle.
- 1948 Galerie Le Verseau, together with “Le Cirque” group, with a portrait of two clowns about to speak and a landscape of Villiers-sur-Morin.
- 1949 Salon des Artistes Indépendants
- 1949 Galerie Saint Placide
- 1949 Salon d’Automne
- 1949 Salon des Tuileries, with “La Femme au Gilet rouge”.
- 1949 Galerie Doucet, with “Quatre Points Cardinaux”.
- 1949 Galerie Le Verseau, with “La Vie en rose”.
- 1950 Société des Artistes Indépendants
- 1950 Salon d’Automne.
- 1950 Galerie Allard, with the “Groupe des Dix”, with “Tête d’Enfant” and “Femme mettant ses Bas”.
- 1951 Galerie des Saussaies, with 20 paintings.
- 1951 Salon d’Automne, with “Au Café”.
- 1951 Salon des Artistes Indépendants, with “Le Bal à l’Auberge”.
- 1952 Galerie Allard, with his very personal children, nudes and flowers
- 1952 Salon des Peintres Témoins de leur Temps, with “Deux Fillettes jouant au Jeu de Dames”.
- 1952 Salon d’Automne, with “La Cour de Ferme”.
- 1953 Salon des Artistes Indépendants, with “L’Enfant aux Fruits”.
- 1953 Salon du dessin et de la peinture à l'eau.
- 1953 Galerie Monique de Groote about “Les Filles”.
- 1953 Galerie Jacquet, in Bourges.
- 1953 Galerie Mirador, with 20 paintings.
- 1954 Salon d’Automne, with “La Fillette au Damier”.
- 1955 Salon des Peintres Témoins de leur Temps about “Le Bonheur”.
- 1955 Galerie Jacquet, in Bourges, with 20 paintings.
- 1955 Salon des artistes honfleurais.
- 1955 Galerie Breteau, about “Le Taureau” (the bull). (Note: This gallery was located at rue des Canettes, it was run by René Breteau (1907–1972), and was active from 1937 to 1987.)
- 1955 & 1957 Galerie Saint-Placide, with 20 recent paintings. (Note: Located at 41 rue Saint-Placide, run by Jean Rumeau, this gallery was active from 1947 to 1966.)
- 1959 Grand Hotel du Cap Ferrat, in Saint-Jean-Cap-Ferrat.
- 1959 Galerie 65, in Cannes.
- 1959 & 1960 Galerie Recio, with Jean Cocteau and others. (Note: Then located at 25 Rue de la Boétie, in Paris.)
- 1960 Galerie de Presbourg.
- 1964 Biennale de peinture of Menton, with "Nature morte au fleurs bleu".

== Sources ==
- Jean-Albert Cartier: Documents. Encyclopédie Générale des Beaux-Arts aux XIXe et XXe siècles, peintres, sculpteurs, graveurs, architectes, décorateurs, etc. "Simon-Auguste 1909". École Française Nº 13. Éditions Pierre Cailler, Genève. Imprimé en Suisse. Octobre 1955.
- Michelle Seurière: "Simon-Auguste". Jean Grassin Éditeur, 1962.
