= Musée Cantini =

Art museum in Marseille, France

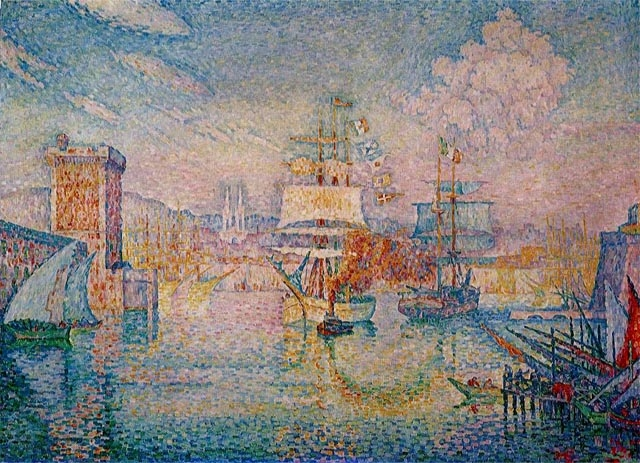
- Paul Signac: L'entrée du port de Marseille
- Interactive fullscreen map
- Location: Marseille
- Coordinates: 43°17′32″N 5°22′41″E
- Type: Art museum

The Musée Cantini (French: [myze kɑ̃tini]; lit. 'Cantini Museum') is a museum in Marseille that has been open to the public since 1936. The museum specializes in modern art, especially paintings from the first half of the 20th century.

== Building ==
The musée Cantini building was built in 1694 for the Compagnie du Cap Nègre, specializing in coral fishing on the northern coasts of Tunisia and in the trade of wool, wax and leather. The company ran into financial difficulties and the building was sold in 1709 to Dominique de Montgrand great-grandfather of Jean-Baptiste-Jacques-Guy-Thérèse de Montgrand, future Mayor of Marseille. The building was then sold to Louis Joseph Chaudoin in 1801, and to Dieudonné Bernadac in 1816. In 1888, it was acquired by Jules Cantini who bequeathed it to the City of Marseille in 1916, with the stipulation that it was to become a museum of decorative arts. The museum was opened in 1936.

== Collection ==
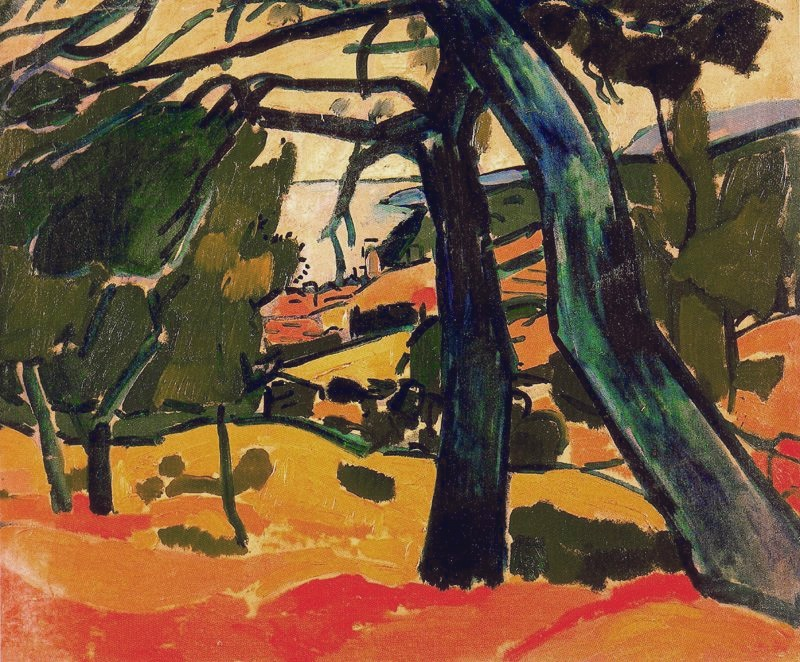
André Derain, Pinède à Cassis (Landscape), 1907, oil on canvas, 54 x 65 cm

The Musée Cantini has one of the largest public collections in France of the 1900–1980 period, along with a few earlier works such as the 1756 The Expeditionary Corps Embarks for Minorca at the Port of Marseille Under the Command of Marshal de Richelieu. A wide variety of artists is represented, including Charles Camoin, Raoul Dufy, Albert Gleizes, Henri Laurens, Wassily Kandinsky, František Kupka, Jean Hélion, Alberto Magnelli, Amédée Ozenfant, Max Ernst, André Masson, Simon Simon-Auguste, Jacques Thévenet, Victor Brauner, Joan Miró, Jean Arp.

=== Pointillisme, fauvisme et cubisme ===
- Paul Signac, La Corne d'or, Matin, 1907 et Entrée du Port de Marseille, 1918
- André Derain, Pinède, Cassis, 1907
- Raoul Dufy, Landscapes of l'Estaque, 1908
- Albert Gleizes, L'Ecolier and Etude pour Femme assise, c.1920
- Emile Othon Friesz, Auguste Chabaud, Charles Camoin, Alfred Lombard

=== Inter-War Period ===
- Oskar Kokoschka, Le port de Marseille, 1925
- Jean Hélion, Composition verticale, 1936
- Alberto Magnelli, Pierres n°2, 1932
- Jeanne-Laure Garcin, Les Hommes et la machine, 1932
- Julio Gonzalez, Danseuse à la palette, vers 1934
- Wassily Kandinsky, František Kupka, Jacques Villon ...

=== Surrealism ===
- Max Ernst, Monument aux oiseaux, 1927
- Jacques Hérold, Les Têtes, 1939
- André Masson, Antille, 1943, Le Terrier, 1946
- Jean Arp, Genèse, 1944
- Joseph Cornell, Flat sand box, vers 1950
- Roberto Matta, Contra vosotros asesinos de palomas, 1950
- Wifredo Lam, Francis Picabia, Victor Brauner ...

=== From World War II to 1980 ===
- Pablo Picasso, Tête de femme souriante, 1943;
- Fernand Léger, Nature morte au couteau, 1945;
- Nicolas de Staël, Harmonie rouge, bleue et noire, 1951;
- Alberto Giacometti, Portrait de Diego, 1957;
- Roland Bierge, Nature morte à la Théière brune, 1957;
- Balthus, Nature morte à la lampe, 1958, Le Baigneur, 1960;
- Jean Dubuffet, Vénus du trottoir, 1946, Brouette en surplomb I, 1964;
- Francis Bacon, Autoportrait, 1976;
- Antonin Artaud, Vieira da Silva...
- Jean-Charles Blais, s.t, huile sur bois et collage, 1986;

=== Drawings ===
The museum has drawings by André Derain, Pierre Bonnard, André Masson, Francis Picabia, Mark Rothko, Pablo Picasso, Edward Hopper, Victor Brauner, Jean Dubuffet...

=== Degas theft ===
In 2009, the museum was exhibiting Edgar Degas's pastel on monotype Les Choristes, on loan from the Musée d'Orsay in Paris. It was stolen at the end of the year; the investigation went cold until 2018, when customs officers recovered it from the luggage compartment of a bus outside Paris.

== Bibliography ==
- Régis Bertrand, Lucien Tirone, Le guide de Marseille, édition la manufacture, Besançon, 1991, ISBN 2-7377-0276-3
