= Georges Crès =

French editor and bookseller

Georges-Célestin Crès
- Born: 1875; Paris, France
- Died: 13 December 1935
- Occupations: Publisher; Bookseller; Editor
- Known for: Founder of Éditions Georges Crès & Cie

Georges-Célestin Crès (1875 – 13 December 1935) was a French editor and bookseller, highly active early in the 20th century.

== Life ==
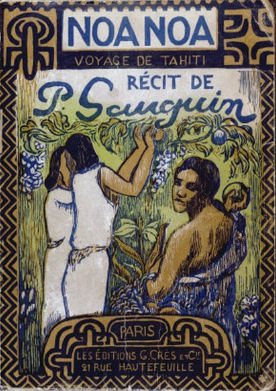
Cover of Noa Noa by Paul Gauguin, illustrated by Daniel de Monfreid, Éditions G. Crès et Cie, 1929.

Georges Crès was born in 1875 in Paris, where he began his career at 13 years old as a bookstore clerk. An autodidact, he began writing in 1905 under the pseudonym Jean Serc, with his first article, "Un clérical athée, M. Jules Soury," appearing in the Mercure de France.

In 1908, he opened a bookstore in Paris, and he began operating as a publisher the following year.

Crès worked with Adolphe van Bever to produce a collection titled "Les Maîtres du livre" ("The Masters of the Book"), which included woodcuts by Pierre-Eugène Vibert. He also published a collection called "Artistes nouveaux" ("New Artists"), overseen by George Besson. These books were beautifully produced but relatively inexpensive.

In 1913, he established the publishing house Crès & C^{ie} (Crès & Co.), which he renamed Éditions Georges Crès & C^{ie} in 1918. It was based in the 6th arrondissement of Paris.

The Swiss section of the French foreign ministry's propaganda office sent Crès to Switzerland in July 1916, and he was tasked with establishing two French-language bookstores in Zurich and Bern.

In the 1920s, he was also a distributor for the publishers Éditions de La Sirène, La Banderole, La Chimère, Devambez, the Société littéraire de France, and others.

After a serious car accident, Crès sold his printing house in 1925 to René Gas and Camille Sauty. He instead took over management of a small publisher called Les Arts et le Livre in 1928, which was renamed Les Œuvres représentatives that year. After his departure, Éditions Crès went bankrupt in 1935.

Crès died in 1935. His son Jean Crès carried on his father's publishing tradition, producing a collection in honor of Georges titled "La Tradition du livre" ("The Tradition of the Book") in 1947. The younger Crès worked as a master printer and publisher until his death in June 1969, and his own son Raymond continued the family tradition as a printer until his retirement; he died in March 2017.

== Notable works printed by Georges Crès & C^{ie} ==
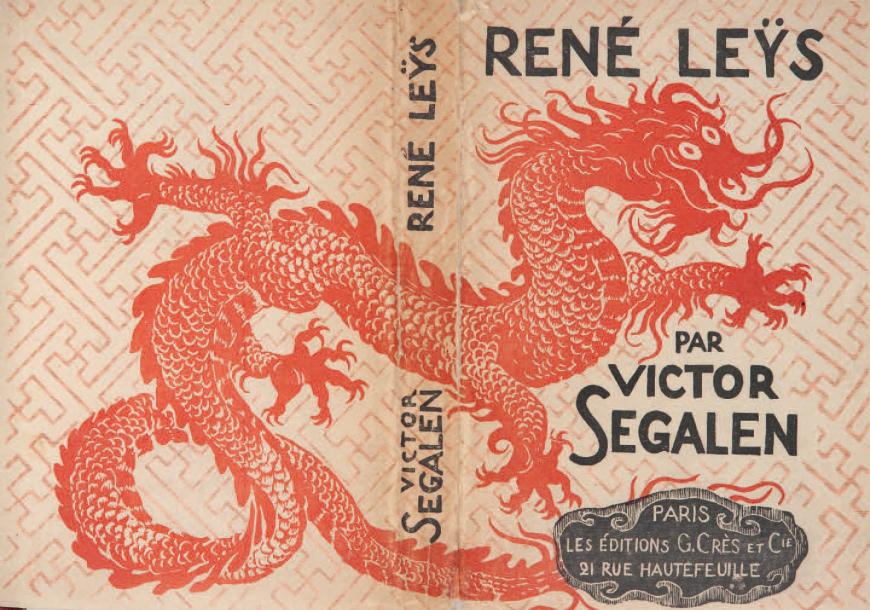
Cover of René Leÿs by Victor Segalen, 1922.

=== Books ===
- La Bibliothèque de l'Académie Goncourt
- "Classica" series (including works by René Bizet, Léon Bloy, Élie Faure, Rémy de Gourmont, Paul Reboux, Victor Segalen, Marcel Schwob, Israel Zangwill)
- "Drames d'histoire et de police" series (including works by Arthur Conan Doyle, J. Storer Clouston, Nathaniel Hawthorne, Arthur Morrisson, Wilfrid Douglas Newton, Marriot Wattson)
- Histoire de l'Art by Elie Faure
- "Les Grands Livres" series (including Gargantua and Pantagruel, Le Rouge et le Noir, plays by Molière)
- Complete works of Victor Hugo

=== Periodicals ===
- La Phalange, revue mensuelle de littérature et d'art edited by Henri Aimé and Jean Royère
- Les Cahiers d'aujourd'hui edited by George Besson

== Bibliography ==
- « L'éditeur Georges-Célestin Crès est mort », in Toute l’Édition, 21 décembre 1935, nº 303.
- « Crès, Georges » par Marie-Gabrielle Slama, in Dictionnaire encyclopédique du Livre, Paris, Cercle de la Librairie, 2002, tome 1, p. 685.
