= Stuart Merrill =

American poet

Stuart Fitzrandolph Merrill (August 1, 1863 in Hempstead, New York – December 1, 1915 in Versailles, France) was an American poet, who wrote mostly in the French language. He belonged to the Symbolist school. His principal books of poetry were Les Gammes (1887), Les Fastes (1891), and Petits Poèmes d'Automne (1895).

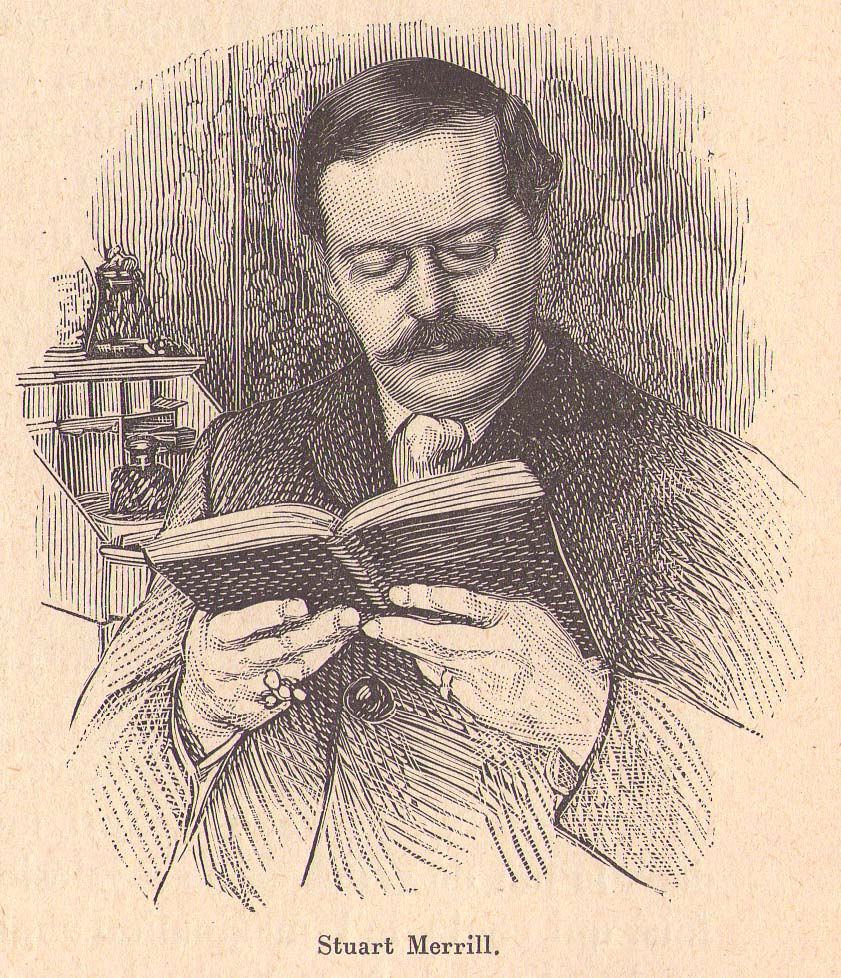

== Life ==
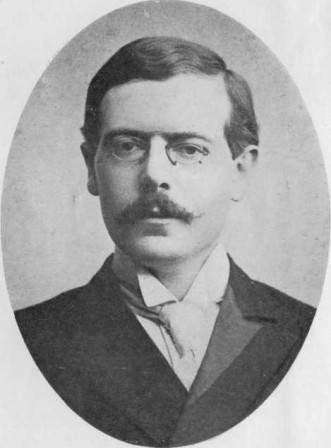
Portrait of the young Stuart Merrill.

Merrill was the product of a conservative, wealthy, Protestant upbringing. In 1866, his father George received a diplomatic appointment to Paris, where Merrill would learn French and live for the next 19 years. Stéphane Mallarmé was one of Merrill's school instructors. His classmates included future symbolists René Ghil and Pierre Quillard. Merrill ran a weekly journal, Le fou, before returning to the States in 1884 to attend law school. On April 15, 1887, he went to Madison Square Theater in New York to hear Walt Whitman give his famous "Death of Abraham Lincoln" lecture. Afterwards, he had the opportunity to meet Whitman, an experience he later recorded in the magazine "Le Masque."

Also in 1887, Merrill published his first book of poems, Les gammes, in Paris, receiving wide critical acclaim in Europe. As his literary career took off he participated in radical political causes, siding with the anarchists in the famous Haymarket riots. When George Bernard Shaw attempted to circulate a petition in London calling for the release of Oscar Wilde, imprisoned for homosexuality, Merrill made a similar attempt to get notable artists and intellectuals in the United States to voice support for Wilde. Merrill's father disinherited him for his politics, but his mother continued to support him financially throughout his life.

In 1890, Merrill published Pastels in Prose, a collection of his translations of French prose poems. This was his only book to be published in America during his lifetime. The same year, he returned to Europe permanently. He married in 1891. For the years 1893–1908, his address was 53 Quai de Bourbon, Île Saint-Louis, Paris. Several more books, including Les fastes in 1891 and Petits poèmes d’automne in 1895, were published before his death of heart disease in 1915. In 1927 a small traffic way in the 17th arrondissement of Paris took the name Place Stuart-Merrill.

== Works ==
- Les gammes (The Ranges), Vanier, Paris, 1887
- Pastels en Prose, Harper & Brothers, New York, 1890
- Les Fastes (The Record), 1891
- Petits Poèmes d'Automne (Little Autumnal Poems), 1895
- Les quatre saisons (The Four Seasons), Mercure de France, Paris, 1900
- Walt Whitman, Henry S. Saunders, 1922
- Prose et vers : œuvres posthumes (Prose and Verse: Posthumous Works), A. Messein, Paris, 1925
- The White Tomb: Selected Writing, Talisman House, 1999
