= Paul Léautaud =

French writer and theater critic

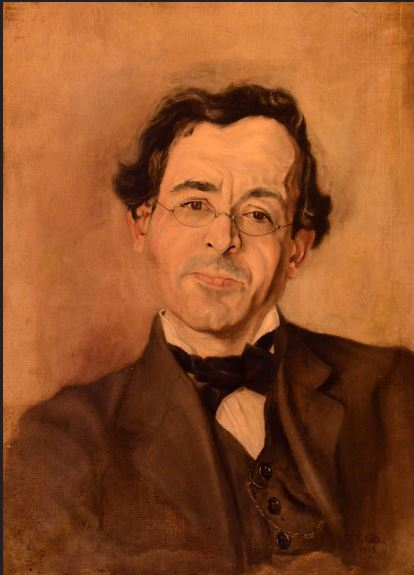
- Léautaud in 1915 painted by Michele Catti
- Born: 18 January 1872; Paris, France
- Died: 22 February 1956 (aged 84); Châtenay-Malabry, France
- Occupation: Writer

Paul Léautaud (18 January 1872 – 22 February 1956) was a French writer and theater critic for Mercure de France, signing his often caustic reviews with the pseudonym Maurice Boissard.

== Life ==
He was born in Paris. Abandoned by his mother, an opera singer, soon after birth, his father, Firmin, brought him up. The two lived in no 13 and later no 21 of Rue des Martyrs, in Courbevoie. "At that time, my father used to go down to the cafe every morning, before lunch. He had thirteen dogs. He was walking down the rue des Martyrs with his dogs and holding a whip in his hand, which he did not use for dogs."

Léautaud became interested in the Comédie-Française and wondered around the corridors and backstage of the theater. His father remarried and had another son, Maurice.

Léautaud studied at the Courbevoie municipal school, where he met Adolphe van Bever. In 1887, at the age of 15, he moved to Paris to work doing small jobs.

"For eight years, I ate lunch and dinner on a four-penny cheese, a piece of bread, a glass of water, and a little coffee. Poverty, I never thought about it, I never suffered from it."

In 1894, Léautaud became a clerk in an attorney's office, the Barberon firm at 17 quai Voltaire. From 1902 to 1907, he dealt with the liquidation of estates with a judicial administrator, Mr. Lemarquis, rue Louis-le-Grand. He was attracted to letters which he read until the late night: Barrès, Renan, Taine, Diderot, Voltaire, and Stendhal.

"I learned on my own, by myself, without anyone, without rules, without arbitrary direction, what I liked, what seduced me, what corresponded to the nature of my mind."

In 1895, he brought to the Mercure de France a poem, Elégie, in the Symbolist taste of the time. Director Alfred Vallette agreed to publish it in the September issue. His collaborations evolved into his writing around 1900.

== As others viewed him ==
He was portrayed by painter Simon-Auguste in 1956. "Paul Léautaud (1872-1956), écrivain, dans sa maison de Fontenay-aux-Roses" is in the Musée Carnavalet, in Paris.

Guillaume Apollinaire's famous poem "Le Chanson du mal-aimé," from Alcools (1913), is dedicated to Léautaud.

According to Nancy Mitford in The Letters of Nancy Mitford and Evelyn Waugh (p.251), Leautaud was an eccentric literary critic and diarist who said he loved cats and dogs more than people, lived on nothing but potatoes and cheese for eight years, and never travelled further than Calais.

Mavis Gallant profiled him in her Paris Notebooks:

He was mean, slanderous, and cruel; he could also display generosity and great delicacy in his judgments. Even at his most caustic there was a simplicity, an absence of vanity, rare in a writer. He talked about death and love, authors and actors, Paris and poetry, without rambling, without moralizing, without a trace of bitterness for having fallen on hard times. He was sustained, without knowing it, by the French refusal to accept poverty as a sign of failure in an artist. Léautaud, at rock bottom, still had his credentials. His monumental diary "Journal Littéraire", which he kept for over 50 years, can without exaggeration be described as the greatest study of character ever written.

He would not stand for any form of grandiloquence where writing was concerned, and words such as "inspiration" were shot down rapidly: "When I see my father dying and write about his death I am not inspired, I am describing." Asked why he had been at his dreadful father's deathbed at all, he said, "It was only curiosity. Cu-ri-o-si-té."

He hated the pompous Comédie Française delivery and thought nothing of bawling objections in the middle of a classical tirade. If no notice was taken of his protest, he simply went to sleep. When he admired a play he put off writing about it because he wanted to take time and thought. As a result the best productions were never mentioned. Often he wrote about something else entirely (his most quoted non-review is about the death of a dog called Span) with one dismissive sentence for play and author.

He had been with Mercure de France for most of his adult life. Only once had he ever thought of leaving, and that was in 1936, when Georges Duhamel became director and committed several sacrilegious acts: he got rid of the gas lamps and had the offices wired for electric light; he installed one telephone, ordered one typewriter and hired one female secretary. Léautaud, who preferred candlelight to any other, was bothered by the reforms: "Why change something that suits me?"

During a radio interview he remarked that he had always wanted a pair of checked trousers. A young boy immediately wrote that his father, a tailor, would be glad to make them for nothing. Léautaud took it as an insult and snapped, on the air, "Do these people imagine I go around bare-arsed?"

He wanted to say before he died, "I regret everything," words, he said, "that will sum up my life." The last thing he did say before dying in his sleep was, "Foutez-moi la paix," ["Leave me the hell alone."] which was more typical.

== Works ==
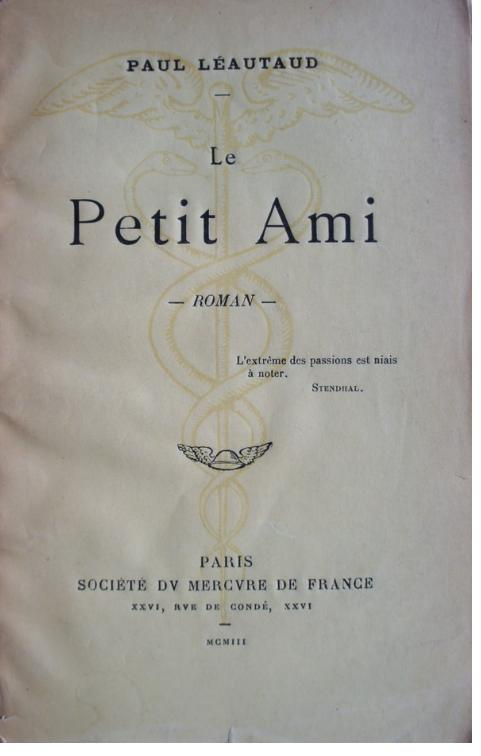
The novel Le Petit Ami, published in 1903 by Mercure de France, was the first work of Léautaud's to appear under his own name.

- 1900: Poètes d'Aujourd'hui [1880-1900], morceaux choisis accompagnés de notices biographiques et d'un essai de bibliographie (Note: This anthology, originally in only one volume, was reissued in a two-volume revised edition in 1908 and in a three-volume revised edition in 1929.) with Adolphe van Bever, Mercure de France
- 1903: Le Petit Ami (Note: Published as a serial in 1902 in the Mercure de France review) Société du Mercure de France
- 1926: Le Théâtre de Maurice Boissard : 1907-1923
- 1928: Passe-Temps, Mercure de France
- 1942: Notes retrouvées (Imprimerie de Jacques Haumont, Paris) : « Lundi 25 août 1941. En triant de vieux papiers, je retrouve une série de notes que j'avais bien oubliées. Je ne sais plus si je les ai utilisées, ni si elles se trouvent à leur place dans mon "Journal". Je les regroupe ici par ordre de dates (de 1927 à 1934). »
- 1943: Le Théâtre de Maurice Boissard - 1907-1923 - avec un supplément
- 1945: Marly-le-Roy et environs, Éditions du Bélier
- 1951: Entretiens avec Robert Mallet, Gallimard
- 1954 to 1966: Journal littéraire 19 volumes
- 1956: In Memoriam
- 1956: Lettres à ma mère, Mercure de France
- 1956: Le Fléau. Journal particulier 1917-1930, Mercure de France
- 1958: Amours
- 1958: Le Théâtre de Maurice Boissard : 1915-1941 (tome 2)
- 1959: Bestiaire, Grasset
- 1963: Poésies
- 1964: Le Petit ouvrage inachevé
- 1966: Lettres à Marie Dormoy, Éditions Albin Michel, réimprimé en 1988.
- 1968: Journal littéraire, Choix par Pascal Pia et Maurice Guyot
- 1986: Journal particulier 1933, présenté par Edith Silve, Mercure de France
- 2001: Correspondance de Paul Léautaud. Tome 1, 1878-1928 recueillie par Marie Dormoy
- 2001: Correspondance de Paul Léautaud. Tome 2, 1929-1956 recueillie par Marie Dormoy
- 2004: Chronique poétique, Éditions Sigalla
- 2012: Journal particulier 1935, présenté par Edith Silve, Mercure de France
