= Léon Deffoux =

French journalist (1881–1945)

Léon Louis Deffoux (10 August 1881, in Paris – 15 February 1945, in Paris) was a 20th-century French journalist.

== Works ==
- Un Communard, préface de Henri Céard, Paris : Chez Figuière, 1913

On Naturalism and the Académie Goncourt

- L'immortalité littéraire selon M. de Goncourt, suivie d'une petite chronologie du Testament et de l'académie Goncourt, P., Delesalle, 1918, in-16, 47 p.
- Du Testament à l'Académie Goncourt, suivi d'une petite chronologie du Testament de l'Académie et du prix Goncourt, P., Société anonyme d'éditions et de librairie, 1920, in-16, 79 p.
- In collaboration with Émile Zavie, Le Groupe de Médan, followed by two essais on Naturalisme, P., Payot, 1920, in-16, 311 p., fac-sim., lettres inédites, 6 reprod. d'autographes, notes et documents nouveaux. Une édition ultérieure, revue et augmentée de textes inédits, couronnée par l'Académie française, P., Crès, in-16, 328 p., s.d.
- Des origines de l'académie Goncourt. Ed. de Goncourt membre de l'Académie de Bellesme, suivi du texte intégral du Testament avec références and commentaries, P., Mercure de France, 1921, in-8°, 32 p. (extrait du Mercure de France du 15 July 1921).
- Les Goncourt, Zola et l'Impressionnisme, in la Revue Mondiale, 1928, t. 186.
- Chronique de l'académie Goncourt, P., Firmin-Didot, 1929, petit in-8° carré, 231 p., with ill.
- Le Naturalisme avec un florilège des principaux écrivains naturalistes, P., les œuvres représentatives, coll. « Le XIXe siècle » dirigée par René Lalou, 1929, in-1 6, 287 p.
- Éphémérides de l'affaire du Journal et de la correspondance des Goncourt, en encartage hors texte de l'édition des Lettres d'Émile Zola à MM. de Goncourt, préf. by Maurice Le Blond, Paris, Paul Catin, 1929, coll. «Le Document Autographe», n°1 (these ephemerides cover the period from 27 January 1928 to 15 February 1928).

On J.-K. Huysmans

- In collaboration with Émile Zavie, J.-K. Huysmans converti littéraire, Paris, Éditions des Écrits Français, 1914, in-16,15 p., portrait.
- Preface to the Logis de Huysmans, by M.-C. Poinsot and G.-H. Langé, Paris, Maison française d'art et d'édition, 1919, in-16, 64 p., portrait, fig.
- J.-K. Huysmans et les Pères Salésiens, a little known work by J.-K. H., l'esquisse biographique sur Don Bosco, P., Mercure de France, 15 October 1920, in-8°, 15 p.
- De J.-K. Huysmans et sur J.-K. Huysmans, P., in L'Ami du Lettré, G. Crès, 1923.
- Le 20e anniversaire de la mort de J.-K. Huysmans, P., in L'Ami du Lettré, 1928, Grasset, 1927.
- J.-K. Huysmans sous divers aspects, Notes, forgotten texts, references, bibliography and iconography, Paris, Mercure de France; Brussels, éd. N.R.B., 1942, in-16, 163 p., figure, portr. and fac-sim. h. texte. (Collection «Les essais», lère série, n°5), reprise de l'E. 0. (1927) c/ G. Crès, in-8°, 148 p., ill. with 4 lithos by O. Redon, but without the l'iconography.
- Iconographie de J.-K. Huysmans, précédée de notes sur un projet de journal de Huysmans et sur l'Institution Hortus, Paris, le Divan, 1942, in-8°, 21 p., H.C.

== Sources ==
- Almanach des lettres françaises et étrangères, under the direction of Léon Treich, Éditions Georges Crès & Cie, Saturday 2 February 1924, (p. 129)
