= René Ghil =

French poet

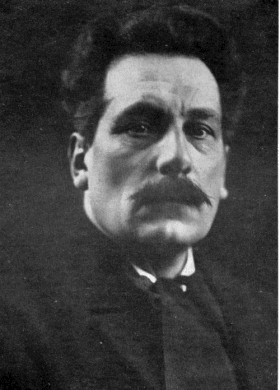
- Portrait of René François Ghilbert
- Born: René François Ghilbert; 27 September 1862; Tourcoing, France
- Died: 15 September 1925 (aged 62); Niort, France
- Education: Lycée Fontanes
- Occupation: Poet

René François Ghilbert (27 September 1862 – 15 September 1925), known as René Ghil, was a French poet. He was a disciple of Stéphane Mallarmé, a major contributor to the symbolist movement in France, although they later had a falling out over ideological differences. Ghil published a series a short stories which together were called the Traité du Verbe. He worked extensively on a new system of poetic language in reaction to the Decadent Movement and Symbolism. Owing to his widespread use of personal syntax and neological vocabulary, much of Ghil's work was inaccessible, and his own contemporaries labelled it confusing. However, his works gained wider attention after his death.

== Early life and education ==
René François Ghilbert was born on 27 September 1862 in Tourcoing. He went to Paris in 1870 to study at Lycée Fontanes, where his classmates included Rodolphe Darzens, Pierre Quillard, Stuart Merrill, André-Ferdinand Hérold, André Fontainas, and Éphraïm Mikhaël. This group of friends subsequently became known as the "Fontanes group".

== Literary career ==
Portrait of René Ghil by Remy de Gourmont

Ghil was a disciple of Stéphane Mallarmé, a major French symbolist poet. Ghil published his first book in 1885. In the same year, he published a series of short stories, which were together called, the Traité du Verbe. (Note: Some sources state that the Traité du Verbe was published in 1886.) His works also included extensive metaphysical references especially to matter, the history of the universe, and human development. According to Joseph Acquisto of the University of Pennsylvania, Ghil worked towards developing an ideal poetic language that would "subsume and supersede all the other arts", by establishing his own system of verbal instrumentation. Ghil's theory was intended to support scientific poetry, which included inert matter, atomic-level concepts, human knowledge, and ways of attaining wisdom. This system established relations among vowels, consonants, colours, music (orchestra), and emotions, which he expanded in a style through versions of the Traité du Verbe. Though it is not clear which or how these scientific principles were applied, Ghil always claimed these observations were based on scientific facts.

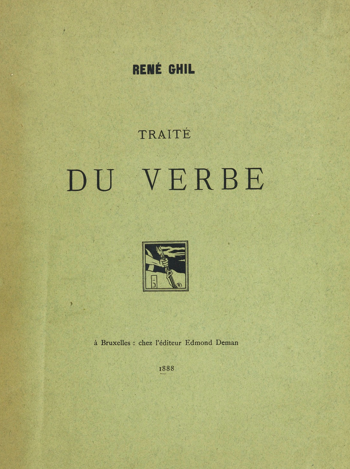
Cover of Traité du Verbe published in Brussels in 1888

Though he initially admired Mallarmé's works, Ghil later became a critic because of their ideological differences. In one of Mallarmé's gatherings in Rue de Rome, Ghil openly expressed his disagreement with him, which ended their relationship. Before this incident, Mallarmé wrote the preface to one of Ghil's works. After his estrangement from his mentor in 1888, Ghil continued to work relentlessly on his own school of instrumentalism, a philosophico-aesthetic system in reaction to the Decadent Movement and Symbolism, which were prevalent in the late 19th-century. This was based largely on serious misreadings of the works of Hermann von Helmholtz, a German physicist, Arthur Rimbaud, a French poet, and Auguste Comte, a French philosopher and writer.

In 1923, he published Les dates et les œuvres, symbolisme et poésie scientifique, a sort of autobiographical report, which attempts to re-situate its singularity and its contribution to the avant-garde of the early 20th-century. Owing to widespread use of personal syntax and neological vocabulary, much of Ghil's work was inaccessible. Many of Gihl's peers felt that his works were confusing, and critics described it as "an exceptional and monstrous failure".

Here is a sample of verbal instrumentation from one of his published works:

oû, ou, oui (ll), iou, oui
Browns, blacks to reds
F, L, N, S
Long, primitive flutes
Monotony, doubt, simplicity.
—Instinct to be and to live.

— Traité du Verbe (1904) p. 179

== Death and legacy ==
Ghil died on 15 September 1925, in Niort, France. Much of Ghil's work was widely criticised and ignored while he was alive. However, it gained attention after this death. According to French literary critics Jean-Pierre Bobillot and Jean-Nicolas Illouz, Ghil's work is highly accomplished, uncompromising, of singular thought, and mature, and deserves to be read today for its insights on poetry, knowledge and the public thing.

== Works ==
Contemporary editions by the author

- Légende d'âmes et de sangs, Paris, L. Frinzine, 1885
- Traité du verbe, avec " Avant-dire " de Stéphane Mallarmé, Paris, Giraud, 1886
- Légendes de rêve et de sang, Livre II : Le Geste ingénu, Paris, L. Vanier, 1887
- Le Pantoun des pantoun, poème javanais, Paris et Batavia, 1902. Reproduit à l'identique et commenté dans Échelle et papillons – Le Pantoum de Jacques Jouet, Les Belles Lettres, 1998 ISBN 2-251-49008-6. Texte sur Gallica
- De la poésie scientifique, Paris, Gastein-Serge, 1909
- La tradition de poésie scientifique, Paris, Société littéraire de France, 1920
- Les dates et les œuvres : symbolisme et poésie scientifique, Paris, G. Crès, 1922

Collection

- Œuvre, Paris, Mercure de France – E. Figuière, 1889–1926, 9 tomes en 14 volumes, comprenant : I. Dire du mieux; I. Le meilleur devenir; II. Le geste ingénu; III. La preuve égoïste; IV. Le vœu de vivre; V. L'ordre altruiste; II. Dire des sangs; I. Le pas humain; II. Le toit des hommes; III. Les images du monde; IV. Les images de l'homme.

Reissues

- Légende d'Âmes et de Sangs, Plein Chant, 1995, ISBN 978-2854521337.
- Le Vœu de Vivre & autres poèmes choisis par Jean-Pierre Bobillot, avec CD (lecture par R. Ghil en 1913), Presses universitaires de Rennes, 2004 ISBN 978-2868479792.
- De la Poésie scientifique & autres écrits, textes choisis, présentés par Jean-Pierre Bobillot, Ellug, 2008 ISBN 978-2843101151.
- Chant dans l'espace & Poèmes séparés, La Termitière, 2012 ISBN 978-2914343190.
- Les Dates et les Œuvres. Symbolisme et Poésie scientifique, texte établi, présenté et annoté par Jean-Pierre Bobillot, Ellug, 2012.

== Notes ==
Footnotes

Citations
