= Pierre Quillard =

French poet, playwright, translator and journalist (1864–1912)

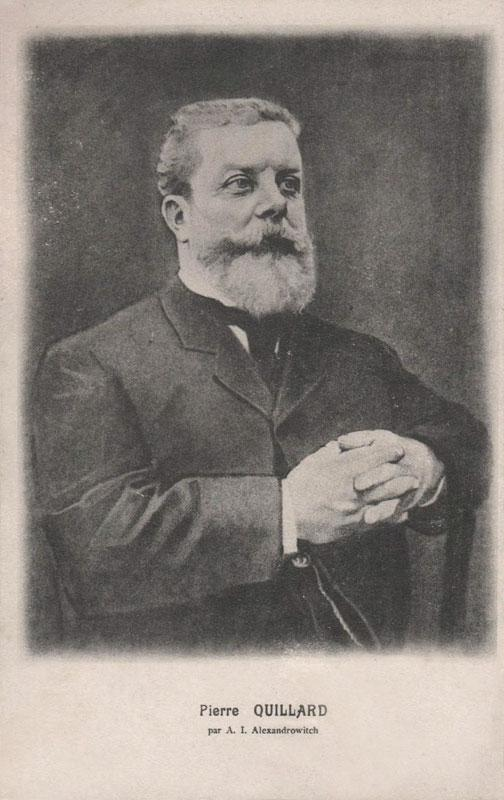
- Born: 14 July 1864; Paris, France
- Died: 4 February 1912 (aged 47); Neuilly-sur-Seine, France

Pierre Quillard (14 July 1864 – 4 February 1912) was a French symbolist poet, playwright, literary critic, philosopher, Hellenist translator, and journalist. As a thinker and anarchist activist, he stood as one of the early proponents of the Armenophile movement in France, notably through his bimonthly publication, Pro Armenia. Later on, he fervently joined the defense of Dreyfus and is regarded as one of the most accomplished intellectuals among the Dreyfusards, testifying on behalf of Émile Zola during his trial.

Within the scope of his aesthetic and political reflections, he advocated for using literature as a revolutionary weapon and sought to delineate a "poetics of the terror attack."

Playing a coordinating role between French anarchists and the Armenian Revolutionary Federation (ARF), Pierre Quillard also served as a witness and compiler of historical sources regarding the Hamidian massacres, a series of atrocities carried out by the Ottoman Empire under Abdul Hamid II. A founding member of the League of Human Rights, he played a central role during its initial period and became its secretary-general in 1911, shortly before his death. He also defended other persecuted groups, such as the colonized inhabitants of the Congo and the Jews of Eastern Europe.

Despite being a significant figure of his generation, he gradually faded into obscurity.

== Biography ==
=== Poet and playwright ===
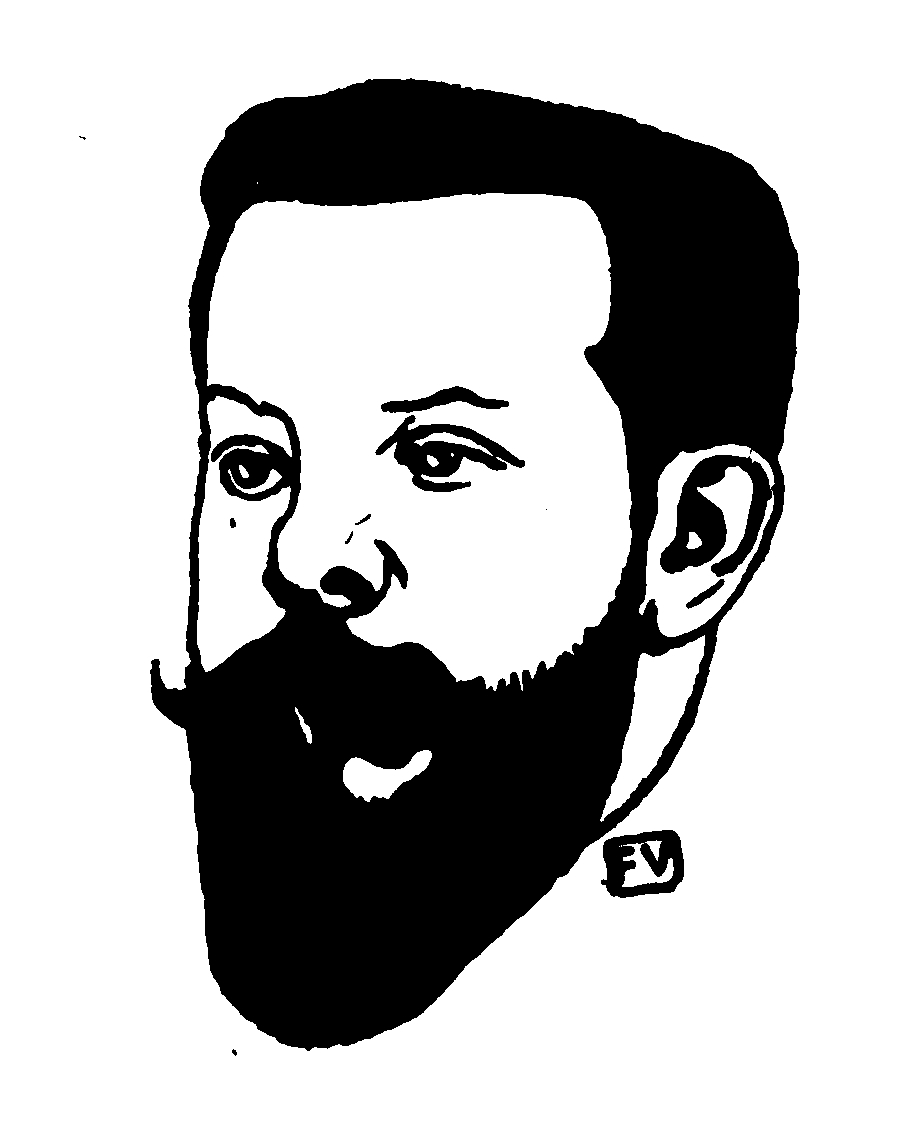
Pierre Quillard drawn by Remy de Gourmont in 1896.

Pierre Quillard pursued his education at Lycée Condorcet, where his classmates included Éphraïm Mickaël, Stuart Merrill, René Ghil, André Fontainas, Rodolphe Darzens, Georges Vanor, and Jean Ajalbert. He contributed his initial poems to the journal Le Fou and incurred the displeasure of the headmaster for publishing a sonnet that began with the alexandrine, "Un lendemain de fête on a mal aux cheveux" ("The day after a celebration, one has a headache").

Continuing his studies at the Sorbonne, followed by the École pratique des hautes études and the École nationale des chartes, which Quillard joined in 1888 without, however, completing a thesis.

In 1886, he co-founded the magazine La Pléiade with Rodolphe Darzens, Saint-Pol-Roux, and Éphraïm Mikhaël. His first play, "La Fille aux mains coupées" (The Girl with Cut Hands), was published in the same journal alongside René Ghil's "Traité du verbe." His initial collection of poems, "La Gloire du Verbe" (The Glory of the Verb), released in 1890, received praise from Remy de Gourmont as "one of the rare poems of this time where the idea and the word march in harmonious rhythm." Described by a contemporary as a knight with a "clear eye, flavescent beard, raising his head high, the helmet of hair pushed back, revealing a forehead reminiscent of a primitive Flemish painting, with a special feature of a vaguely sarcastic immobility of the upper lip."

Beginning in 1891, he collaborated with the Mercure de France, a relationship that endured until his death. Quillard showed interest in the theater of his time, offering reflections on the subject, particularly in an article titled "De l’inutilité absolue de la mise en scène exacte" ("On the Absolute Uselessness of Exact Staging"), where he proposed "the refusal of restrictive scenic visibility," a technique previously employed in "La Fille aux mains coupées." He maintained a close friendship with Octave Mirbeau, with the two regularly visiting and exchanging ideas. He was actually part of a group of friends in the literary circles of Paris; he associated with Mallarmé, who was his friend and to whom he wrote, as well as other writers and thinkers of the time. In that context, he was one of the thinkers of Symbolist aesthetics and made innovations in certain literary domains, such as his push towards the exploration of aesthetics and the absolute beauty within Symbolism, a movement he shared with Mallarmé. One of his friends, Fernand Gregh, wrote about his artistic rigidity:

"[Pierre Quillard, even if he was], a man of the left [...] believed that I had failed the ideal of 'art for art's sake' by celebrating human hope. It was the first crack in my Symbolist friendships."

=== Anarchism and early political struggles ===
In 1892, Pierre Quillard contributed to the magazine "Entretiens politiques et littéraires", expressing his views on the relationship between anarchism and literature. He advocated for using literature as a revolutionary weapon, stating:

"It must be admitted that the explosion of a few dynamite bombs strikes terror into vulgar minds. […] On the contrary, the destructive power of a poem does not disperse at once: it is permanent, and its detonation is certain and continuous; and Shakespeare or Aeschylus prepares as infallibly as the boldest anarchist comrades the collapse of the old world."

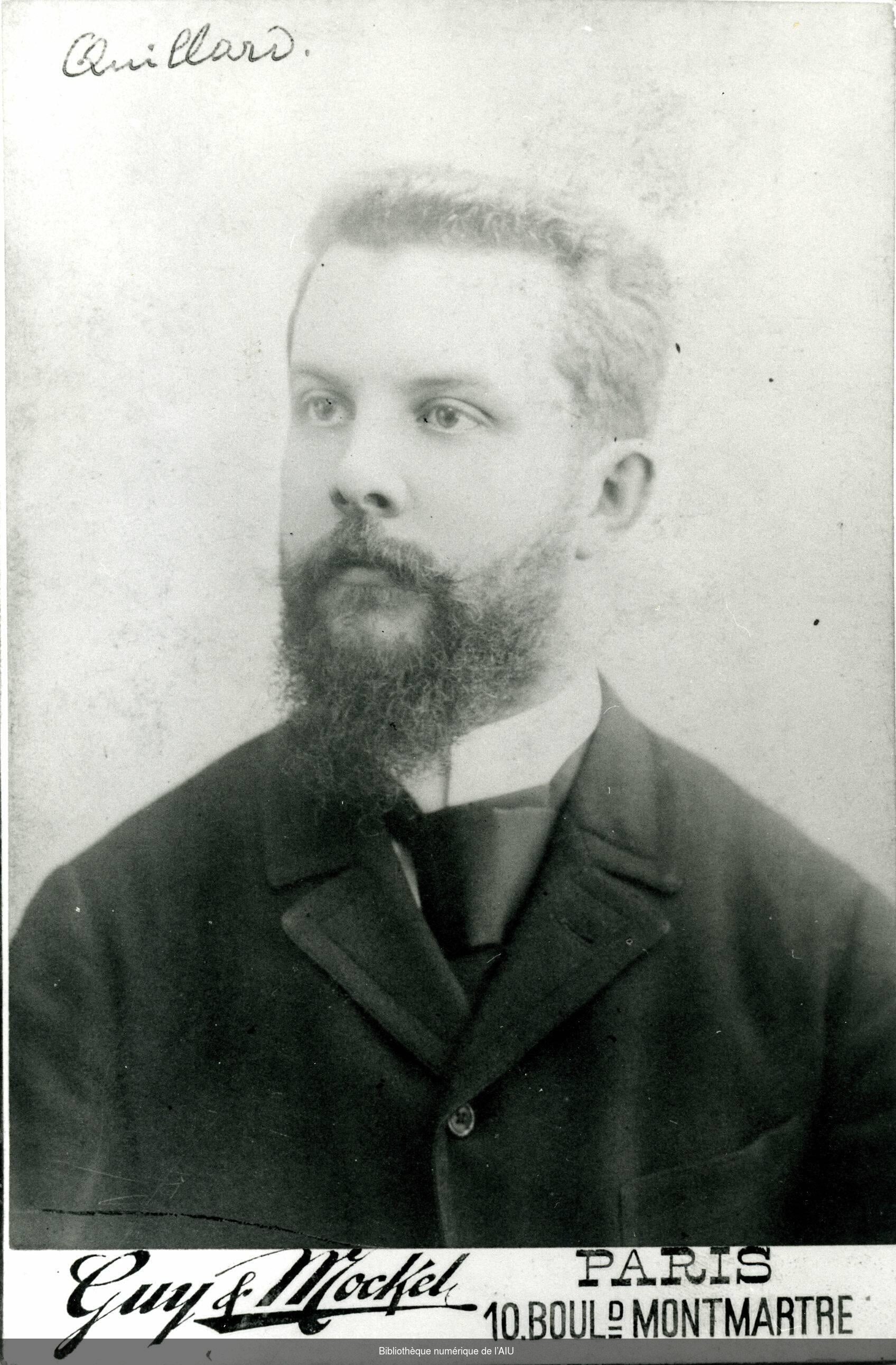
Pierre Quillard (1898)

In other writings, such as an article about Ravachol shortly after his death, whom he compared to a "Mallarmé of dynamite", Quillard sought to outline a "politics of symbolism". For him, "the aesthetic and political domains do not belong to fundamentally different orders; they are rather the branches of the same order. Such a vision allows the symbolists to write poems about fauns, abandoned gardens, or the flow of fountains while demanding the overthrow of the state". He attempted to develop a "poetics of the terror attack" in this text about Ravachol, an aesthetic stance shared by other authors of his time.

Quillard collaborated with "L’En-dehors" by Zo d'Axa, "Journal du peuple" by Sébastien Faure, and "Les Temps nouveaux", the most widely read anarchist journal of the time, organized by Jean Grave. He maintained connections with Stuart Merrill, another anarchist symbolist poet.

In 1893, he moved to Constantinople to teach Latin and French at the Gregory the Illuminator College, run by Catholic Armenians in Pera (Beyoğlu in Turkish). He also taught philosophy and the history of literature at the Central School of Galata, founded by the Armenian Patriarch of Constantinople, Nersès Varjapétian. During his stay, which lasted until 1896, he interacted with numerous Armenians, including the poet and intellectual Arshag Chobanian in 1894. However, he also became an eyewitness to the Hamidian massacres (1894–1896), events he documented in the Revue de Paris in an article dated 1 September 1895, under the pseudonym Maurice Le Veyre. From then on, he became a fervent Armenophile, producing multiple works and articles on the situation of Ottoman Armenians. His interventions and publications contributed to raising awareness of the Hamidian massacres in Western Europe.

The echoes of Ottoman persecutions against the Armenian population of the Ottoman Empire reached Europe. The Armenian Revolutionary Federation, a revolutionary Armenian political party, sent a delegation to Europe, including Christapor Mikaelian and Jean-Loris Mélikov (nephew of Mikhail Loris-Melikov), who met with Pierre Quillard. In 1899, he co-founded a libertarian school with Jean Grave.

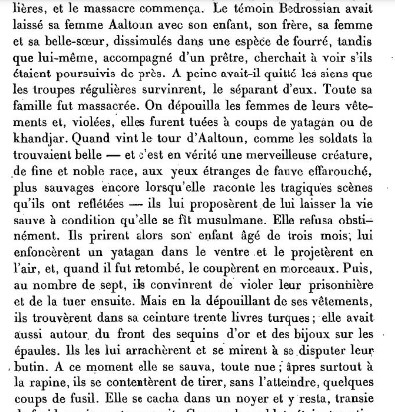
Excerpt from Pierre Quillard's article on the Hamidian massacres.

In October 1900, he founded the bimonthly magazine Pro Armenia, which supported the Armenian cause following the ARF's line and featured articles by Jean Jaurès, Anatole France, Francis de Pressensé, Georges Clemenceau, and Victor Bérard. Charles Péguy supported the journal through his publishing house, which took charge of its publication. In 1901, he organized a meeting of the Armenophile movement in Brussels; many anarchists and, more broadly, socialists attended, but Élisée Reclus expressed to Quillard that he only attended the meeting out of friendship and did not expect meetings to change the situation of the Armenians.

In 1903, he organized a meeting at the Sarah Bernard Theatre to support Armenia and the Armenian Revolutionary Federation (ARF), which was represented there. He declared:

"This situation is, in reality, common to all of Turkey, as it is general causes that create among all populations in Turkey an anarchist or revolutionary state of mind that is nothing but the natural resistance of human beings defending their property and their lives. They defend their property against the Turkish regime and their lives against the Hamidian regime."

In 1904, during an annual congress bringing together Armenian and Bulgarian representatives, the Armenian Revolutionary Federation decided to assassinate Sultan Abdul Hamid II in response to the Hamidian massacres. Pierre Quillard attended and reported to his anarchist colleagues that the Armenians intended to use "extreme methods." After the death of Christapor Mikaelian while preparing the assassination attempt against the Sultan, Pierre Quillard dedicated a few pages to him in his journal, praising his memory and his 'revolutionary work.' Despite his death, the Armenian Revolutionary Federation (ARF) successfully completed their preparations and, on 21 July 1905, the ARF attempted to assassinate Abdul Hamid II in the Yıldız Mosque attack with the help of a Belgian anarchist, Edward Joris. He was arrested and sentenced to death, prompting Pierre Quillard to use his journal, Pro Armenia, to advocate for his release—a stance shared by his colleague Jean Grave in Les Temps nouveaux.

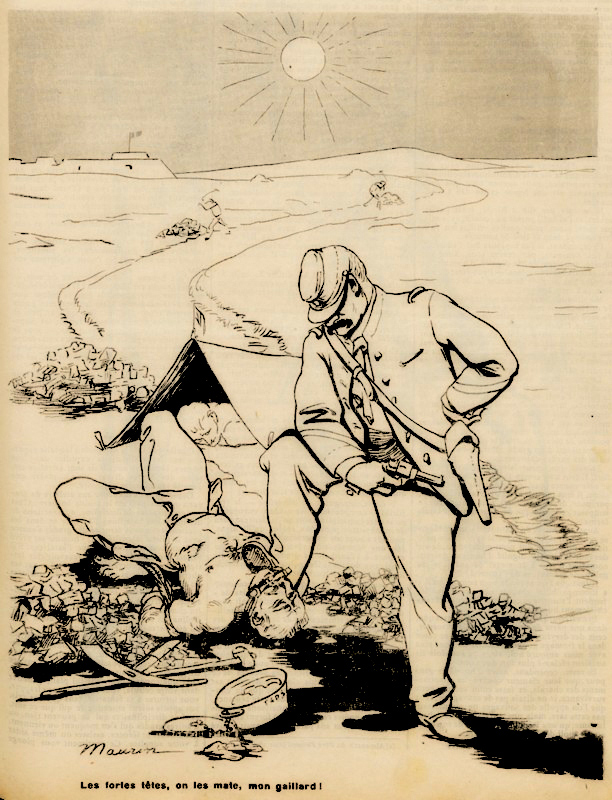
Illustration by Charles Maurin (1857–1914) in Les Temps nouveaux for the special issue 'Meure Biribi!' in which Pierre Quillard participated.

=== Dreyfus Case and last years ===
In the late 1890s, in 1898, Pierre Quillard was among the founders of the League of Human Rights. He actively engaged in the Dreyfus Case and is considered the most accomplished intellectual among the Dreyfusards. An intimate friend of Bernard Lazare, who shared his anarchist views, he became a Dreyfusard through Lazare's influence. Quillard collaborated with the Journal du peuple and published a large volume listing all the subscribers to the campaign organized by the La Libre Parole newspaper in support of the widow of Commander Henry. Described by Mathieu Dreyfus, the older brother of Alfred Dreyfus, as a "gentle and erudite anarchist with a calm voice," Quillard testified at Émile Zola's trial in his defense.

He then embarked on a tour of France, possibly giving around a hundred lectures in support of Alfred Dreyfus. In one of these lectures, he expressed:

"There are currently innocent individuals suffering in the penal colony due to [the lois scélérates]. You must help us free them. And if the crime is committed [...], you will remain with us and oppose it by all means, even by force, and you will follow us to the end along the roads of rebellion, on the red roads where we will go."

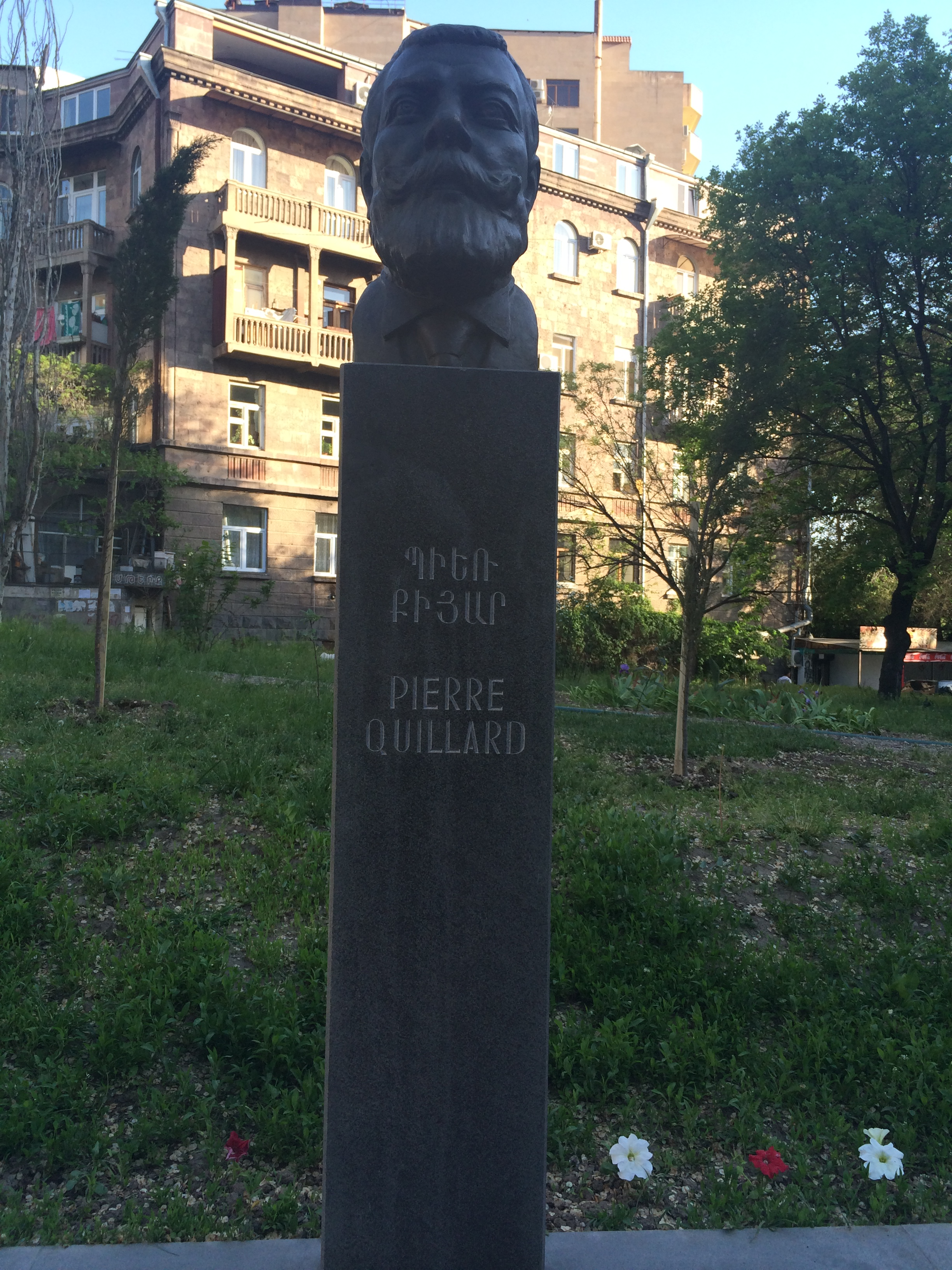
Bust of Pierre Quillard in Yerevan, Armenia

After the death of his friend Bernard Lazare, Pierre Quillard took steps to ensure that Lazare's memory would not be forgotten. He played a significant role in the creation of the Lazare Monument in Nîmes. In 1910, he participated in the renowned issue of "Les Temps nouveaux" titled "Meure, Biribi!" attacking the Biribi, military penal colonies for refractory soldiers located in North Africa. The issue gained attention following the death of a soldier from beatings by two guards. From 1911 to 1912, he served as the Secretary-General of the League of Human Rights.

Continuing his activism, he opposed the Italo-Turkish War in 1911. Alongside Gustave Rouanet, a close friend of Jean Jaurès, he engaged in the defense of Eastern European Jews facing pogroms and advocated for the colonized population in the Congo.

Pierre Quillard died suddenly from a heart attack on 4 February 1912. He was buried in the Père-Lachaise Cemetery in the 26th division. The Armenian Revolutionary Federation sent the following telegram upon his death:

"Struck by unexpected loss Pierre Quillard, valiant director Pro Armenia, defender oppressed peoples. Send heartfelt condolences members collaborators Pro Armenia: Pressensé, Anatole France, Clemenceau, Jaurès, Bérard, Roberty, d'Estournelles, Cochin, all those who supported cause our people in difficult times. His dear memory will live among us in work uplifting and fraternization Eastern races."

== Legacy ==
Pierre Monatte dedicated a eulogy to him and declared about him: "The working class loses in him one of the rare intellectuals who, without asking anything from the authorities, do what they can and remain upright". Despite being a significant figure of his generation, he gradually faded into obscurity.

== Sources ==
- Jean Maitron (dir.), Dictionnaire biographique du mouvement ouvrier français. Troisième partie, 1871-1914, de la Commune à la Grande Guerre, t. XIV, Éditions ouvrières, Paris, 1976
- Edmond Khayadjian, Archag Tchobanian et le mouvement arménophile en France, CNDP, Marseille, 1986. 2^{e} édition : Sigest, Alfortville, 2001.
