= Jacques Thévenet =

French painter (1891–1989)

- Born: 17 October 1891; Montquin, France
- Died: 5 April 1989 (aged 97); Paris
- Known for: Paintings and illustrations

Jacques Thévenet (17 October 1891 – 5 April 1989) was a French painter and illustrator.

== Early life and education ==
Jacques Thévenet was born in Montquin, Dommartin township, Nièvre department, France (17 October 1891) in the family’s ancestral home, built by his great grand-father, Auguste Hugues Claude Thévenet, lawyer from Château-Chinon.

He had 3 sisters and lost his mother in 1895 when he was only four. His father Louis moved the family to Paris where he run a law practice.

Young Jacques studied at the Lycée Carnot and later attended the École de droit of the Sorbonne University. Simultaneously, he attended the Académie Julian, with several painters such as Amédée de la Patellière, Jean Crotti, Arthur Szyk. (Note: He later alluded to this circumstance as an accidental passion. He passed by everyday and went in to see, prompted by curiosity.)

In 1912 he was deployed to Nancy for the military service and mobilized for service within the 11e division d’Infanterie/Division de fer to fight at the Great War after which he was awarded a medal and a petit galon d’or.

== Interwar years ==
Thévenet and his father joined the Liberation celebrations in the Champs Elysées 11 November 1918. It was then when he discarded the idea of taking over his father’s law practice. "I was to the point of no return", he later recalled.

In 1919 he joined the workshop of interior designer Marcel Mathelin, where he learned new techniques and art forms such as ink, lithography, costume projects for theater and cinema, fashion sketches and shop displays.

In 1920 he married Marcel’s daughter, Paule, and the couple had two children: Renée (1921) and Pierre (1925). He became partner at his stepfather’s business.

Interested in theatre and cinema, Thévenet took reading lessons at the Théâtre du Vieux Colombier under theatre director, producer, actor, and dramatist Jacques Copeau. He met filmmaker Abel Gance at the Pathé Production company in the Joinville studios.

== Paris debut ==
In 1922 he made his debut at the Société des Artistes Indépendants, along with Paul Signac and Maximilien Luce. He then started exhibiting regularly at the Salons and Galleries of Paris and became a member of the Salon d’Automne. Influenced by André Dunoyer de Segonzac, his preferred subjects were still lifes and figures.

Also in 1922 he met art critic Roger Allard, director of luxury editions at publishing company Èditions Gallimard, run by Gaston Gallimard. Allard introduced him to writers Antoine de Saint-Exupéry, Jules Romains, Jacques de Lacretelle, Roger Martin du Gard, Léon-Paul Fargue, among others, with whom he collaborated throughout his life.

In 1923 he worked with Abel Gance in the film "La roue".

In 1926 he traveled around Elbeuf, in Normandy, with writer André Maurois.

In 1927 art critic Robert Rey (Note: (Oran 1888 – Paris 1964) French art historian, museum curator, art critic and writer. He held several notable positions in the Paris art scene: Chief Curator of the National Museums, Director of Plastic Arts at the Department of Fine Arts, member of the Académie des Beaux-Arts, professor at the École du Louvre and at the École nationale supérieure des beaux-arts. From 1922 until his death in 1964, he contributed to almost all French art reviews as well as to numerous magazines and published many books.) wrote positively about Thévenet in the "Europe Nouvelle".

In May 1930 he visited writer Jean Giono in Manosque and the two became friends.

== Marseille years ==
In 1932 he visited Marseille to attend his exhibition at the Pol Le Roy gallery. His friends Jean Giono, composer Arthur Honegger and his wife, concert pianist Andrée Vaurabourg, attended the exhibition which was a great success. So much so, he settled at a studio located at 12 Quai de Rive-Neuve, in the old port, where he stayed until 1942. (Note: Painter, designer and illustrator Alfred Lombard (Marseille 1884 – Toulon 1973) owned the studio in Marseille before him, and painter François Diana (Marseille 1903–1993) acquired it after World War II.)

Giono introduced him to writer and filmmaker Marcel Pagnol who shot the film Manon des Sources in Château-Chinon.

In 1933 Giono visited Thévenet in Montquin. (Note: To the question of why he liked Thévenet's paintings so much, he answered: "I cannot say anything about his paintings as they are there for you to see. I can only comment on Thévenet as a motorbike driver.")

In 1936 he met poet, dramatist, and diplomat Paul Claudel in Marseille. The two became friends and Claudel visited Thévenet in Montquin in 1939. This year Thévenet fell ill and went to the Alps to convalescence. At this time, he made drawings to illustrate the Spanish Civil War.

In 1939 Giono wrote a positive review about him in Paris-Soir.

In February 1940, Paul Claudel exhibited Thévenet’s paintings at his Parisian flat, (Note: Located at 4 Avenue Hoche, Paris; the building does not exist anymore.) which was a big success. All the paintings were sold.

While in Paris, his friend artist Othon Friesz introduced Thévenet to painter, sculptor and designer Henry de Waroquier, film director and writer André Heuzé, painter and interior designer Valdo Barbey, and interior designer Raymond Subes.

In 1940, Roger Allard introduced Thévenet to editors Guy Schoeller and young Robert Laffont. (Note: Schoeller pushed Laffont to found Éditions Robert Laffont the following year.) Around this time, several personalities and collectors purchased paintings direct from Thévenet in his Marseille studio, namely: actor and entertainer Maurice Chevalier, painter Paul Signac, Prince Pierre de Monaco, and banker, writer, and filmmaker Philippe de Rothschild.

During the Paris occupation he returned there for business only. The War marked a period of less artistic activity and higher introspection. Roger Allard dedicated one edition of his "Masters of tomorrow" series to Thévenet. In it, he wrote:

"Jacques Thévenet has painted hundreds of canvases, none of which is similar or meaningless because none is a lie or a pretension, and each one, with its own charm, has that family resemblance that distinguishes well-born painting. Jacques Thevenet's art is not that of a man in a hurry. His drawings have the easy way of conversation."

== After World War II ==
After 1945 Thévenet was very active as a painter and an illustrator. He portrayed his friends Arthur Rubinstein, Jean Giono and Paul Claudel. He started spending four months in his ancestral home and the rest of the year in his Parisian studio.

In 1947 he traveled to Morocco and joined the "Groupe d’Émulation Artistique du Nivernais", and provided illustrations for the exhibition catalogues.

In 1951 he did the interior deco for businessman Charles Scheneider’s office.

In 1953 he traveled with Giono around Italy (Rome, Orvieto, Assisi, Arezzo, Florence) and Spain (Toledo and Granada). In the Summer of 1957, the two returned to Italy again, to gather drawings and illustrations for Giono and Jean Rostand.

In 1954 he started his collaboration with "Livre de Poche", to illustrate book covers.

In 1964, he was the guest of honor of the Société Creusotine des Beaux-Arts.

== The Morvan ==
Later on in life, Thévenet became involved in the development of the arts in the Morvan. He helped to bring value to local painters which in the first half of the 20th century formed the School of Autun:

- Albert Montmerot (Autun 1902 – Couches 1942)
- Alice Grillot (Autun 1877–1969)
- André Dulaurens (Autun 1918–1988)
- Claude Pallot (Le Creusot 1901–1987)
- Estelle Nectoux (Mesvres 1905 – Autun 1995)
- Étienne de Martenne (Lyon 1868 – Paris 1920)
- Jean Charlot (Bourges 1921 – Uchon 1970)
- Louis Charlot (Cussy-en-Morvan 1878 – Uchon 1951)
- Lucien Labille (Dracy-Saint-Loup 1887 – La Comelle 1944)
- Lucien Séevagen (Chaumont 1887 – Île de Bréhat 1959)
- Maxime Simon (Paris 1879 – Eaubonne 1941)
- Paul Louis Nigaud (Digoin 1895 – Autun 1937)
- Pierre Bressoud (Beaune 1916 – Villeneuve-la-Garenne 1979)
- Raymond Rochette (Le Creusot 1906–1993)
- Yvone Fiot-Thiéblemont (Autun 1898 – Montsauche-Les-Settons 1998)

Writer Joseph Pasquet (Note: Writer (Château-Chinon 1888–1972)) invited him to the foundation of the "Académie du Morvan" 15 July 1967. The event took place in Château-Chinon and several personalities attended: statesman François Mitterrand, doctor and politician Léon Bondoux, law professor Jules Basdevan, historian, and archivist Régine Pernoud, writer, editor, and art critic Henri Perruchot, writer and journalist Joseph Bruley, writer and professor Jean Chatelain, businessman Louis-Philippe Bondoux, alongside the three directors: doctor and archaeologist Lucien Olivier, engineer Henri Desbruères and professor and linguist Claude Régnier.

In 1972, the library of Autun organized a tribute to him by presenting his works. His conference for the occasion resulted into "Un peintre du livre et ses modèles". Jean Séverin (Note: Pseudonym of local writer Antonin Bondat (Montreuillon 1911 – Talant 1998)) wrote an article about him in the "Journal du Centre", a publication active in Nevers since 1944.

In 1973, the town of Château-Chinon dedicated one room of its museum to Jacques Thévenet. The "Journal du centre" published an article about him titled "The Morvan from the point of view of a painter"

In 1975, in an interview with Yvonne Carré, Thévenet described his love for the Morvan region: "I used to hear people say that the Morvan was not a nature for painters, that it lacked color, that all its land full of forests, all these fields surrounded by hedges, made it a dark country, with no warmth. But it is this very character that first attracted me."

In 1978 "Vivre en Bourgogne" published an interview with Thévenet by journalist Marcel Barbotte.

He died on April 5, 1989 in his Parisian studio at 3 Auguste Comte. His works can be found in private collections and museums such as the Centre Pompidou, the Metropolitan Museum of Art, New York, the Musée d'Art Moderne de Paris, the Kunstmuseum Den Haag, the Museum of Fine Arts, Reims, and the Museum of modern art André Malraux - MuMa.

== Paris salons and exhibitions ==
- 1921 Salon d'Automne.
- 1922 Société des Artistes Indépendants ("Selfportrait") and Salon des échanges in the Galerie La Licorne, Paris.
- 1923 Galerie Bernheim-Jeune, with Pierre Bompard, Jean Émile Laboureur, es:Amédée de la Patellière, André Dignimont and André Villeboeuf.
- 1923 Galerie Berthe Weill, rue Lafitte, solo exhibition introductory notes in the catalogue by Roger Allard.
- 1923 Salon des échanges, in the Galerie de la Licorne. (Note: This is one of the oldest galleries in Paris, it moved location during its existence between 1863 and 2019.)
- 1924 Salon des Tuileries and Galerie Nouvel Essor, Paris. (Note: Located at 40 rue des Saints-Pères in Paris.)
- 1925 Galerie de l'Étoile, Paris. One solo exhibition and another one with Yves and Charlotte Alix.
- 1927 Galerie d'Art Contemporain, Paris (Note: Located at Boulevard Raspail in Paris) and Galerie Seligman in New York.
- 1928, 1961 and 1965 Galerie Katia Granoff, "Quatre salons", Paris.
- 1931 Galerie Marseille, quai Voltaire in Paris.
- 1932 Galerie Pol Le Roy, Marseille.
- 1933 Galerie Da Silva, Paris.
- 1935 Galerie du Radeau, quai de Rive-Neuve, Marseille (with Moïse Kisling, Simon Simon-Auguste and Auguste Chabaud).
- 1937, 1938 and 1954 Galerie Pétridès, Paris.
- 1940 In Paul Claudel’s flat, at no 4 Avenue Hoche in Paris.
- 1943 Galerie Lefranc et Engrand, Paris.
- 1944 and 1945 Galerie Jacques Dubourg, Paris. (Note: It run between 1927 and 1973 under Jacques Dubourg.)
- 1946 and 1951 Galerie Charpentier, Paris, prefaces of the catalogues by Louise de Vilmorin and Germaine Beaumont, respectively. (Note: Located at 76, rue du Faubourg-Saint-Honoré, active between 1942 and 1965.)
- 1947 Galerie Jacquart, Paris, paintings and watercolors from Morocco. (Note: Located at 27 Rue de Seine)
- 1954 Galerie Pétridès, Paris.
- 1957 Galerie Pol Le Roy, Marseille, Jean Giono writes the preface.
- 1958 Galerie des Capucines, Paris.
- 1969 Galerie André, Paris.
- 1972, 1974, 1976, 1978, 1980, 1982, and 1984 Galerie des Orfèvres, Paris. (Note: Located at 23 Place Dauphine in Paris, and run by Marc and Yvonne Carré.)
- 1974 Maison de la culture in Nevers.
- 1979 Galerie Varine-Gincourt, Paris. (Note: Located at 110 Boulevard de Courcelles in Paris.)

== Illustrations ==
- 1920 Jean Giono, "Un de Baumugnes", Ed Les Bibliophiles in Latin America.
- 1922 Maurice Genevoix, "Rémi des Roches", Ed La Belle Édition, Paris.
- 1927 Bernard Barbey, "La Maladère", Édition Les Exemplaires, preface by François Mauriac.
- 1927 André Maurois, "Bernard Quesnay", Ed De la Nouvelle Revue Française.
- 1928 Roger Martin du Gard, "Jean Barois". Ed N.R.F.
- 1930 Jean Giono, "Un des Baumugnes", Ed Les Bibliophiles de l'Amérique latine.
- 1933 Jean Giono, "Regain", Ed Les Bibliophiles de Provence.
- 1944 Henry de Montherlant, "Un incompris", Ed N.R.F.
- 1946 Roger Martin du Gard, "Les Thibault", Ed Gallimard.
- 1947 Colette, "Bella-Vista", Éditions de la Galerie Charpentier.
- 1948 André Gide, "Récits, Romans, Soties", Ed N.R.F.
- 1948 André Gide, "L'Immoraliste"; La porte étroite; Les Cent Une.
- 1950 Antoine de Saint-Exupéry, "Œuvres Complètes",
- 1950 Marcel Aymé, "La Vouivre", Ed La Belle Édition de Paris.
- 1952 André Gide, "Poésie, Journal, Souvenirs", Ed Gallimard.
- 1954 Marcel Pagnol, "Manon des Sources", Editions de Provence.
- 1955 Jean Giraudoux, "Œuvres Romanesques", Éditions Grasset.
- 1956 Rosamond Lehmann, "Intempéries", Ed Livre de Poche. (ISBN 2253003301)
- 1956 Edmond Rostand, "Cyrano de Bergerac"; Ed Paul André Vial.
- 1956 Elizabeth Goudge, "L'Auberge du Pèlerin", Ed Livre de Poche.
- 1957 Mary Webb, "Sarn", Ed Livre de Poche.
- 1957 Charles Morgan, "Fontaine", Ed Livre de Poche.
- 1957 Jean Giono, "Jean le Bleu", Ed La Belle Édition.
- 1957 Jean Giono, "Provence", Ed La Belle Édition.
- 1957 Édouard Peisson, "Hans le marin", Ed La Belle Édition.
- 1958 Maurice Genevoix, "Rémi des Rauches", Ed La Belle Édition.
- 1959 Édouard Peisson, "La Mer Baltique", Ed La Belle Édition.
- 1959 Roger Martin du Gard, "Les Thibault", Ed Livre de Poche.
- 1959 André Taminau, "Dormir aux Granges", Chassaing à Nevers.
- 1960 Jules Renard, "Nos frères farouches", Ed La Belle Édition.
- 1960 Jules Renard, "Journal, textes choisis", Ed La Belle Édition.
- 1960 Rudyard Kipling, "Le Retour d'Imray-Récits insolites", Ed La Belle Édition.
- 1960 Henri Beraud, "Au Capucin Gourmand", Ed La Belle Édition.
- 1960 Jean Giono, "Colline", Ed Livre de Poche.
- 1963 Alain-Fournier, "Le Grand Meaulnes", Ed le Club du Livre.
- 1963 Romain Rolland, "L'Âme enchantée", Ed Livre de Poche.
- 1963 Alain-Fournier, "Le Grand Meaulnes", Livre de Poche.
- 1966 André Chamson, "Le chiffre de nos jours", Ed Livre de poche.
- 1967 Jules Verne, "Mathias Sandorf", Ed Maurice Gonon.
- 1967 Joseph Pasquet, "Le Morvan", Roger & Jean-Pierre Montaron.
- 1967 Alphonse Daudet, "Lettres de mon Moulin", Ed les Heures Claires.
- 1968 Guy de Maupassant, "La petite roque; Mont-Oriol", Ed Gérard Watelet.
- 1968 Anatole France, "Œuvres Complètes", Édito Service.
- 1975 Louis de Courmont, "Mon Morvan, poèmes et patoiseries", Éditions Bourgogne Rhône Alpes.
- 1976 Julien Daché, "Morvandiaux, mes frères", Éditions Bourgogne Rhône Alpes, (Henri Perruchot award).

== Sources ==
- Roger Allard: Les Maitres de Demain: Jacques Thévenet, Editions Sequana, 1943.
- Jacques Thévenet: Un peintre et ses modèles, in La Revue des deux Mondes, no 6, 15 March 1966.
- Jacques Thévenet: Cavalcade dans les collines, in Figaro littéraire, homage to Jean Giono, 19 to 25 October 1970.
- Jacques Thévenet: Vents du Morvan, 1972.
- Yvonne Carré: Rencontre avec Jacques Thévenet, Académie du Morvan, 2e Année Bulletin nº 3, 1975.
- Richelieu-Drouot – Millon et Associés Auction Catalogue, in Paris, 8 December 1997.
- Jean-Louis Balleret: Le Morvan vu par ses peintres, Acedémie du Morvan, Château-Chinon, 34e année, Bulletin nº 64, 2007, ISSN 0750-3385
- Laurent Gaillard, Florence Amiel Rochette and Jean-Louis Charlot: Les peintres d'Autun 1900–1950, Une inspiration en Terre Autunoise, Somogy Éditions d'art, Paris 2017
