= Jean Lartigue =

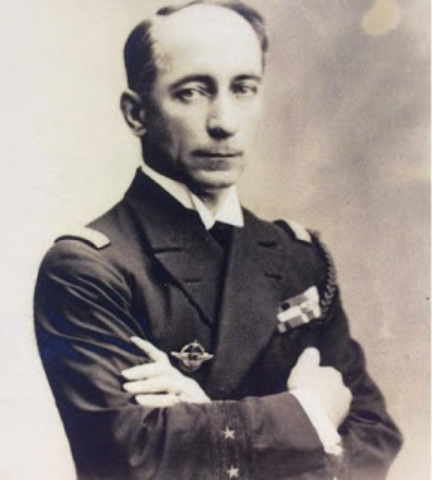

Jean Julien Pierre Lartigue (26 July 1886 – 22 June 1940) was a French admiral. Head of the French naval aviation, he was killed during a German bombing raid on Rochefort.
