= Prix Antonin-Artaud =

French literary award

The prix Antonin Artaud was a French literary prize created by Jean Digot and a few poets on 24 May 1951 in Rodez, in memory of Antonin Artaud, and was awarded for the last time in 2008.

The aim of this prize - in addition to paying tribute to the writer who was interned at the psychiatric asylum in Rodez between 1943 and 1946 - was to draw the attention of readers and book professionals to a work and a poet who deserved to take an essential place in contemporary poetry in French. It was given annually on the occasion of the « Journées poésie de Rodez » ("Poetry Days of Rodez") taking place in May and, from 2006, crowned the whole of a work. It was up to publishers to propose an author to the jury.

== Laureates ==
- 1952: Robert Sabatier, Les Fêtes solaires (Editions Janus)
- 1953: Anne-Marie de Backer, Le vent des rues (Éditions Seghers)
- 1954: Alain Borne, En une seule injure (Rougerie)
- 1955: Pierre Delisle, Forêts (Cahiers du Sud)
- 1956: Jean Joubert, Les Lignes de la main (Seghers)
- 1957: Georges-Emmanuel Clancier, Une voix (Éditions Gallimard)
- 1958: Gaston Puel, Ce chant entre deux astres (Henneuse)
- 1959: Hubert Juin, Quatre Poèmes (Oswald)
- 1960: Luc Decaunes, L'Amour sans preuves (Robert Laffont) / Rouben Melik, Le Chant réuni (Seghers)
- 1961: Louis Guillaume, La nuit parle (Subervie)
- 1962: Claude Sernet, Les Pas recomptés (Seghers)
- 1963: Jean Malrieu, Vesper (La Fenêtre Ardente)
- 1964: Georges Herment, Seuil de terre (La Fenêtre Ardente)
- 1965: Roger Kowalski, Le Ban (Chambelland)
- 1966: Loys Masson, La Dame de Pavoux (Laffont)
- 1967: Pierre Gabriel, Seule mémoire (Subervie)
- 1968: Pierre Dargelos, À tout jamais les feuilles (Chambelland)
- 1969: Bernard Noël, La Face de silence (Flammarion)
- 1970: Paul Pugnaud, Minéral (Rougerie)
- 1971: Jean-Louis Depierris, Quand le mauve se plisse (Seghers)
- 1972: Gilbert Socard, Travaux souterrains (Rougerie)
- 1973: André Miguel, Boule androgyne (Saint-Germain-des-Prés)
- 1974: Simon Brest, La Ville engloutie (éd. du Cratère)
- 1975: Christian Hubin, La Parole sans lieu (La Fenêtre Ardente)
- 1976: Robert Delahaye, Saisons (Rougerie)
- 1977: Gérard Bayo, Un printemps difficile (Chambelland)
- 1978: Jean Rivet, Les Beaux Moments (Saint-Germain-des-Prés)
- 1979: Roland Reutenauer, Demain les fourches (Rougerie)
- 1980: Gérard Le Gouic, Géographie du fleuve (Telen Arvor)
- 1981: Denise Borias, Saisons du corps (Rougerie)
- 1982: Luis Dubost, La Vie voilà (Laurence Olivier Four) / Henri Dufor, À feu ouvert (Subervie)
- 1983: Yves Broussard, Traversée de l'inexorable (Actes Sud)
- 1984: Jean-Pierre Siméon, Fuite de l'immobile (Cheyne)
- 1985: Gilles Baudry, Il a neigé tant de silence (Rougerie)
- 1986: Michel Cosem, Aux yeux de la légende (Dominique Bedou)
- 1987: Jacques Lovichi, Fractures du silence (Actes Sud)
- 1988: Jean-François Mathé, Contractions supplémentaires du cœur (Rougerie)
- 1989: Casimir Prat, Elles habitent le soir (Ed. de l’Arbre)
- 1990: Pierre Dhainaut, Un livre d'air et de mémoire (Actes Sud)
- 1991: Lionel Ray, Une sorte de ciel (Gallimard)
- 1992: Dominique Sorrente, Petite Suite des heures (Cheyne)
- 1993: Jeanine Baude, C'était un paysage (Rougerie)
- 1994: Gilles Lades, Les Forges d'Abel (La Bartavelle)
- 1995: Marcel Migozzi, On aura vécu (Télo Martius)
- 1996: Max Alhau, Sous le sceau du silence (Rougerie)
- 1997: Jean-Marc Tixier, L'Oiseau de glaise (Arcantère)
- 1998: Alain Lambert, L'Entretien d'hiver (Æncrages & Co)
- 1999: Pierre Descamps, Cantons (Jacques Brémond)
- 2000: Chantal Dupuy-Dunier, Initiales (Éditions Voix d’Encre)
- 2001: Joël Bastard, Beule (Gallimard)
- 2002: Franck Castagne, Offrandes de la mémoire (Éditions Voix d’Encre)
- 2003: Christian Viguié, La Dure lumière (Rougerie)
- 2004: Michael Glück, Cette chose-là, ma mère (Jacques Brémond)
- 2005: Not attributed
- 2006: Mathieu Bénézet, Mais une galaxie, anthologie 1977-2000 (Coédition Obsidiane / Le Temps qu'il fait)
- 2007: Patrick Wateau, Ingrès (José Corti)
- 2008: Jean-Paul Auxeméry, Les Animaux industrieux (Flammarion)
