= Annette Vande Gorne =

Belgian composer

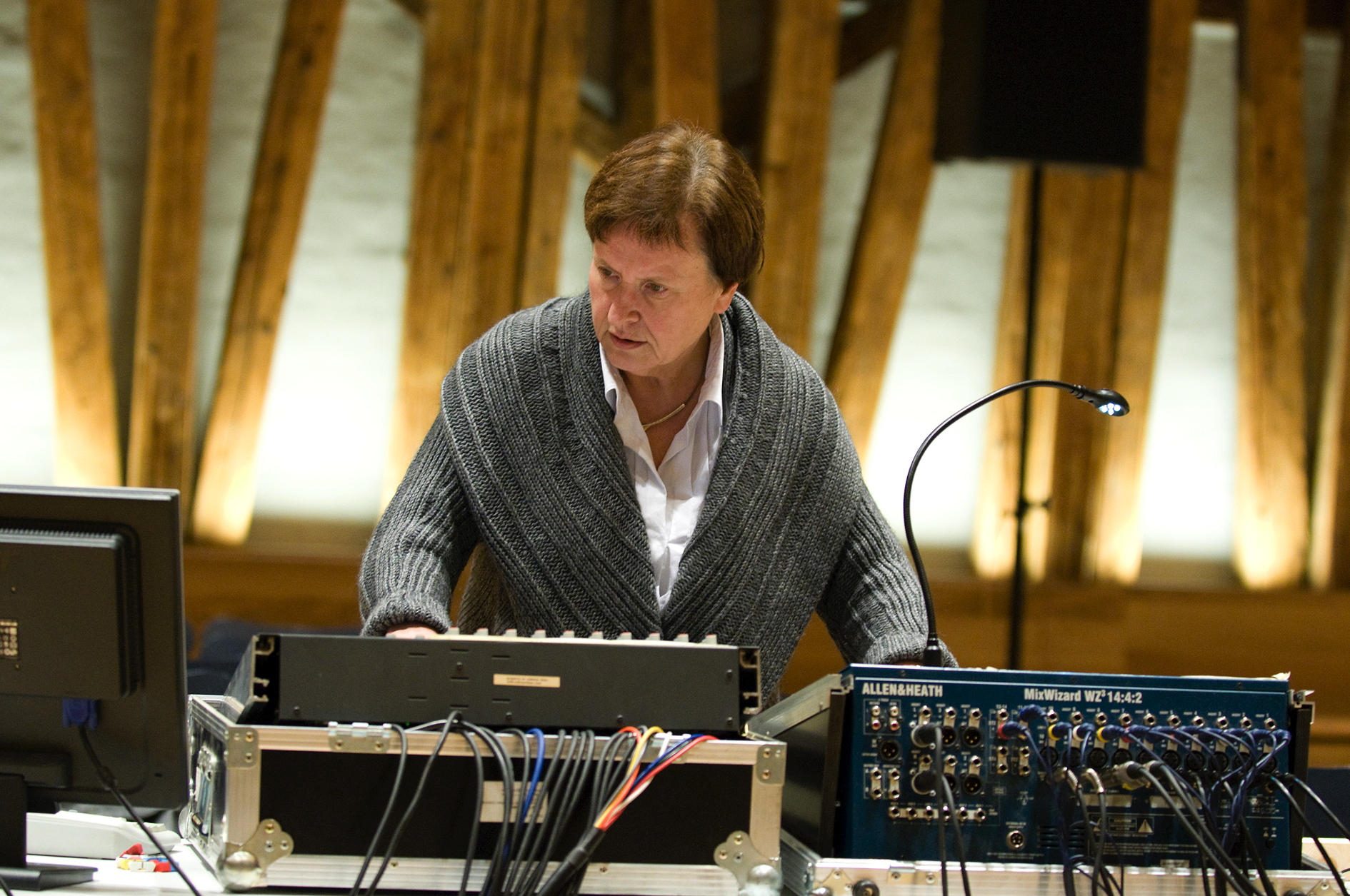

Annette Vande Gorne (born 6 January 1946) is a Belgian electroacoustic music composer currently living in Ohain, Belgium.

== Biography ==
Annette Vande Gorne was born in Charleroi, Belgium. She initially studied music at the conservatories of Mons and Brussels, and privately with Jean Absil. After discovering the acousmatic music developed by Pierre Schaeffer, she became interested in the music of Schaeffer as well as François Bayle and Pierre Henry. She moved to Paris in order to study at the conservatoire with Schaeffer and Reibel. On returning to Belgium she founded the Association de Musiques et Recherches and the Métamorphoses d'Orphée studio. She also launched a series of concerts and an acousmatics festival called L'Espace du son in Brussels in 1984. Since 1986 she has taught in Liège, Brussels, Mons.

== Recordings ==
- Vox Alia (empreintes DIGITALes, IMED 25196, 2025)
- Exils (empreintes DIGITALes, IMED 0890, 2008)
- Impalpables (empreintes DIGITALes, IMED 9839, 1998)
- Le ginkgo; Architecture nuit; Noces noires (SONARt, IMSO 9504, 1995)
- Tao (empreintes DIGITALes, IMED 9311, 1993)

== List of works ==
- Action / Passion (1987), ballet music for a choreography by Patricia Kuypers
- Aglavaine et Selysette (1989)
- Architecture nuit (1988), text by Werner Lambersy
- Bruxelles bivoque (1997)
- Ce qu'a vu le vent d'Est (2003)
- Cosmographie (2003), work for a sculptural installation by Anne Liebabergh
- Énergie / Matière (1985)
- Les énergies (2003)
- Exil, chant II (1983), text by Saint-John Perse
- Faisceaux (1985), piano, and tape
- Figures d'espace (2004)
- Folie de Vincent (1983), incidental music for the theater play Sulphur Sun by Philippe Marannes
- Fragments de lettre à un habitant du Centre (2002), text by Kamal Ben Hameda
- Le ginkgo (1994), text by Werner Lambersy
- Lamento ou la délivrance du cercle (1980–82)
- Les mélanges (2004)
- Le montage (2003)
- Musiques pour Henri IV (1980), incidental music for the theater play by Pirandello
- Noces noires (1986), text by Werner Lambersy
- Paysage / vitesse (1986), ballet music for Nuit Hexoise, a choreography by Odile Duboc
- Les polyphonies (2004)
- Tao (1983–91)
- Vox Alia (1992–2000)
- Yawar Fiesta (2006–07), acousmatic opera
