= Frédéric Jacques Temple =

French poet and writer (1921–2020)

Frédéric Jacques Temple (18 August 1921 – 5 August 2020) was a French poet and writer. His work includes poems (collected in 1989 in a "Personal Anthology"), novels, travel stories and essays.

He also realised translations of English, Thomas Hardy, D. H. Lawrence, Henry Miller, and Lawrence Durrell.

== Biography ==
Frédéric Jacques Temple was born in Montpellier, where he attended the Enclos Saint-François boarding school. He later stated that at the school, "music and art counted as much as studies". He later wrote about the institution, which has since disappeared, in L'Enclos.

From 1943, he participated in the Italian campaign (Les Abruzzes, Monte Cassino, and the Garigliano) with the French Expeditionary Corps under General Alphonse Juin. His wartime experiences later informed works such as La Route de San Romano and Poèmes de guerre.

After being demobilized, Temple worked as a journalist in Morocco and later in Montpellier. In 1954, he was appointed director of French television broadcasting (RTF, later ORTF and FR3) for Languedoc-Roussillon, a position he held until 1986.

Temple met Blaise Cendrars in 1949, an encounter later described as influential in his development as a writer. He paid tribute to Cendrars in his poem "Merry-go-round". His work frequently reflected an interest in travel and international settings, including the United States, Quebec, Brazil, and Russia.

He maintained friendships with Henry Miller, Henk Breuker, Curzio Malaparte, Joseph Delteil, Richard Aldington, Camilo José Cela, Lawrence Durrell, Jean Carrière, and Gaston Miron.

Temple also collaborated with painters including Pierre Soulages, Jean Hugo, Albert Ayme, and Vincent Bioulès on book projects.

As a child, Temple was an avid reader and cited adventure writers such as Jules Verne, James Fenimore Cooper, Joseph Conrad, Herman Melville, and Walt Whitman among his influences, along with figures he referred to as "double heroes", including Jack London, Arthur Rimbaud, and Cendrars.

Temple was also a collector whose interests included natural history, archaeology, music, painting, travel, and gastronomy.

Frédéric Jacques Temple received the Grand prix de poésie de la SGDL (Société des gens de lettres) in 2003 and the prix Apollinaire in 2013. He was also a member of the comité d'honneur of the Maison internationale des poètes et des écrivains in Saint-Malo.

== Work ==
- 2014: Abécédaire Frédéric Jacques Temple. Choix des textes : Pierre-Marie Héron, Claude Leroy, Gérard Lieber avec la collaboration de sa femme, Brigitte Portal. Montpellier, Presses universitaires de la Méditerranée. 200 exemplaires hors commerce.

=== Poems ===
- 1945: Seul à bord, Franz Burda, Offenburg, private edition.
- 1946: Sur mon cheval. Algiers, Edmond Charlot.
- 1949: L’Oiseau-rhume, saynètes. Montpellier, La Murène.
- 1951:
  - L’Ocellé, Linocut by Fermin Altimir. Montpellier, La Licorne.
  - Le Figuier, Linocut by Paul Rey. Montpellier, La Licorne.
  - Foghorn, Cahier de la Revue Neuve. Paris, René Debresse.
    - with a preface by Lawrence Durrell, translation by Nami Greene, Santa Barbara, The Capricorn Press, 1971.
    - reissued, Paris, Éditions Grasset, 1975. Prix des Volcans.
- 1966: L’Hiver, livre accordéon, illustrations by Alain Clément. Montpellier, La Murène.
- 1968: Fleurs du silence, Brussels, Henry Fagne.
- 1969: Les Œufs de sel, etching by Mario Prassinos. Paris, Guy Chambelland
- 1974: Les Grands arbres, white monochrome by Albert Ayme, Paris, Guy Chambelland.
- 1975: Un Long voyage. Venezia, San Lazzaro degli Armeni.
- 1978: Corsiques, illustration by Gaston Planet. Nantes, collection du Colvert.
- 1983: Villages au Sud, Dammard, L’Arbre.
- 1986: Saisons, coll. Philies. Marseille, Sud.
- 1987: Courage, etching by Dagmar Martens. L’Isle-sur-Sorgue, La Balance.
- 1989:
  - Dix poèmes pour l’Art de la Fugue, illustrations by Jacques Bioulès. La Ferté-Milon, L’Arbre.
  - Anthologie personnelle (Fleurs du Silence, Les Œufs de sel, Les Grands arbres, Foghorn, Villages au sud, Paysages privés). Portrait by Vincent Bioulès. Actes Sud, Arles.
    - Prix Valery-Larbaud 1990. Reissued in 2004.
- 1990: Ode à Santa Fe, lithograph by Alain Clément, Les Presses du Jardin, Nîmes.
- 1992: Ulysse à ses chiens. Brussels, L’Arbre à paroles.
- 1993: Poèmes américains, Remoulins-sur-Gardon, Jacques Brémond.
- 1994:
  - La Dive bouteille, poem/calligram, La Ferté-Milon, L’Arbre.
  - La Chasse infinie, etching by Dagmar Martens. La Sauveterre-du-Gard, La Balance.
    - réédition, Paris, Granit, 1995.
    - reprint with a frontispiece by Claude Viallat. Jacques Brémond.
- 1996:
  - Poèmes de guerre, coll. "Méditerranée vivante", Pézenas, Domens.
  - Merry-go-round, serigraphs by Philippe Blanc. Perpignan, Nahuja.
- 1998: Calendrier du Sud, illustration by lain Clément, coll. "Poésie en poche", Marseille, Autres Temps.
- 1999:
  - Boréales/Atlantique Nord, etchings by René Derouin. Montréal, Le Versant Nord.
  - Poëmas, Bilingual edition, translation into Occitan by Max Rouquette, linocut by Fermin Altimir. Montpeyroux, Éditions Jorn.
  - En Brésil (carnet de route), wood by Dagmar Martens. Barriac, Éditions Trames.
- 2001:
  - Vers l’oubli, with drawings by Jacques Clauzel. Gallargues-le-Montueux, Éd. À travers
  - Le désert brûle, with drawings by Jacques Clauzel. Gallargues-le-Montueux, Éd. À travers.
- 2002: À l’ombre du figuier, gouaches by Alain Clément. Fata Morgana.
- 2004:Ode à Saint-Pétersbourg, serigraphy by Pierre Soulages. Barriac en Rouergue, Éditions Trames.
- 2005:Phares, balises et feux brefs. Marchainville, Proverbe.
- 2006:
  - Un émoi sans frontières, Accompanied by a poem by Pierre Morency and a work by René Derouin. Québec, Le lézard amoureux.
  - Sous les branches, gouaches by Alain Clément. Rochefort-du-Gard, Alain-Lucien Benoit.
  - Oiseau, illustrations by Sami Briss, sérigraphy sur papier Arches, Paris, Éditions Dima.
- 2007: Venise toute d'eau. Limited edition of 30 pieces, each with four paintings by André-Pierre Arnal. Dédicated to Rino Cortiana. Montpellier, Fata Morgana.
- 2008: « Flâner à Venise », Europe #945-946, January–February
- 2011: Profonds pays, series "Les Solitudes", Obsidiane.
- 2012: Phares, balises & feux brefs, followed by Périples, Paris, Éditions Bruno Doucey (prix Guillaume-Apollinaire 2013)
- 2016: Une longue vague porteuse. Carnet de bord, Actes sud

=== Novels, narratives, Short stories ===
- 1975: Les Eaux mortes, roman. Paris, Albin-Michel, 1975, réédité par Actes Sud, coll. "Babel", 1996.
- 1981:
  - Montpellier raconté aux enfants, récit, illustrations de Christine Le Bœuf. Arles, Actes Sud/A. Barthélémy.
  - Un cimetière indien, roman. Paris, Albin-Michel, prix de la Société des gens de lettres (SGDL), prix des critiques littéraires, réédité par Actes Sud, coll. "Babel".
- 1992: L’Enclos, roman. Arles, Actes Sud. Prix de l’Académie de Bretagne, réédité en coll. "Babel".
- 1996: La Route de San Romano, roman. Arles, Actes Sud.
- 1999: Retour à Santa Fe, voyage. Marchainville, Proverbe.
- 2002: Couleuvre mon amie, histoire, illustrations de François Bouët, Sommières, Les Contes du Gecko.
- 2003: Le Chant des limules, récit. Arles, Actes Sud. Grand prix de la SGDL.
- 2007: Lazare, nouvelle, tirage limité de bibliophily, sous étuis bois et plexiglas. Le Crès, La bibliothèque du lion.
- 2009: Beaucoup de jours. Faux journal, Arles, Actes Sud.

=== Essays ===
- 1960: David Herbert Lawrence : l’œuvre et la vie, biographie, preface by Richard Aldington. Paris, Pierre Seghers.
- 1963: Célébration du maïs. Forcalquier, Robert Morel.
- 1965: Henry Miller, coll. Classiques du XXe siècle, Éd. universitaires, Paris; Régine Deforges, 1977; La Manufacture, 1986; Buchet/Chastel, 2004.
- 1969: Entretiens, spécial issue of Joseph Delteil (avant-propos).
- 1970: Le Temps des Assassins, by Henry Miller (preface).
- 1973: Entretiens, spécial issue of Lawrence Durrell (preface).
- 1980: Correspondance privée, Henry Miller-Joseph Delteil, 1935-1978. Paris, Pierre Belfond (preface, translations and notes).
- 1981:
  - Poèmes choisis, by Blaise Cendrars. Belgrade, Sloboda (preface).
  - Poètes de Langue d’Oc, Vagabondages, Paris (preface).
- 1983: Paul Gilson, collective work. Lausanne, Le Front Littéraire (direction and preface).
- 1987:
  - Mort d’un héros, by Richard Aldington. Arles, Actes Sud (preface).
  - Le Tombeau de Medora, biographie. Lyon/Paris, La Manufacture. Reissued by Les Éditions de Paris, 2000.
- 1988: Blaise Cendrars, special issue of the review Sud, colloque du Centenaire à Cerisy-la-Salle, 1987 (avant-propos).
- 1995: Correspondence 1934-1979, Blaise Cendrars and Henry Miller. Paris, Éditions Denoël (introduction).
- 2000: Lettre à Curzio Malaparte. Remoulins sur Gardon, Jacques Brémond.
- 2007: Souvenirs of Edmond Charlot, interviews with Frédéric Jacques Temple, preface by Michel Puche. Pézenas, Domens.

=== Translations ===
- 1952: Matière, poems by Gerrit Achterberg, translated from Neerlandish with Henk Breuker and François Cariès, Montpellier, La Licorne.
- 1954: La Merveilleuse Aventure de Cabeza de Vaca, récit de Haniel Long, preface by Henry Miller, lithographies d’Arthur Secunda. La Licorne, Montpellier. Reissued by P.J. Oswald, Paris, 1970, then Hallier/Oswald, Paris, 1970, augmented by Malinche, by the same authordu même auteur.
- 1960: Le Cri du Phénix, one-act play by Tennessee Williams, encres de Arthur Secunda, Montpellier, La Licorne.
- 1963: Les Psaumes de la Création des Indiens Navahos, print by Odette Ducarre, Forcalquier, Éd. Robert Morel. Reissued in 1998 by Jean Le Mauve, Aizy-Jouy, L’Arbre.
- 1964:
  - Beccafico, narrative by Lawrence Durrel. Montpellier, La Licorne.
  - La Descente du Styx, narrative by Lawrence Durrell, with original text, typography by Jean Vodaine, Montpellier, La Murène
- 1970: Le Temps des Assassins, essay on Arthur Rimbaud, by Henry Miller, Paris, Éd. P.J. Oswald, puis Hallier/Oswald. Réédité en 1984 dans la collection 10/18, puis Denoël, 2000.
- 1974: Un Faust irlandais, drama by Lawrence Durrell. Paris, Gallimard.
- 1977: Fils de Clochard, narrative by Neal Cassady. Paris, P.J. Oswald.
- 1990: Poèmes du Wessex, dby Thomas Hardy, coll. "Orphée". Paris, La Différence.
- 1991: Henri Michaux, essay by Lawrence Durrel. Montpellier, Fata Morgana.
- 1993:
  - La Risée du temps, poems by Thomas Hardy, coll. "Orphée". Paris, La Différence.
  - Le Navire de mort, poems by D. H. Lawrence, coll. "Orphée". Paris, La Différence.
  - Chant de la plantation des Indiens Osages, poème-accordéon. La Ferté-Milon, L’Arbre.
- 1995: Lettres à Emil, by Henry Miller. Paris, Christian Bourgois
- 1997: Chants sacrés des Indiens Pueblos. La Ferté-Milon, L’Arbre.
- 2004:
  - Correspondence Lawrence Durrell/Henry Miller. Paris, Buchet/Chastel
  - La Toile et le Dragon (Hommage à Carpaccio), poems by Rino Cortiana. La Ferté-Milon, L’Arbre.
- 2007: Lynx Lynx, poem by Rino Cortiana (extrait). Europe, issue 937 May).
- 2012: Poèmes du Wessex et autres poèmes, dby Thomas Hardy, Paris, Poésie/Gallimard.
- 2015: Lynx Lynx, poem by Rino Cortiana, Remoulins-sur-Gardon, Jacques Brémond.

=== Radio, television ===
==== Main radio programmes ====
- Du monde entier au cœur du monde (1949–1950).
- Entretiens avec Richard Aldington (1955).
- Centenaire des Feuilles d’herbe by Walt Whitman (1950)
- Interviews with Henry Miller (1961).
- Montpellier et le domaine anglais (1966), retransmis sur le Programme national.
- La Fin du Monde, by Blaise Cendrars (adaptation) in 1949.
- Le Petit Retable de Don Cristobal, by Federico García Lorca (adaptation) in 1951.
- Georges Brassens by himself (Brassens' first long-running program), broadcast on the National Program on 21 December 1956.
- Mythes et réalités gitanes, 1969.

==== TV programs ====
- Rhapsodie languedocienne (first channel, 1961).
- Chez Lawrence Durrell (second channel, 1964).
- Le Théâtre Chichois (second channel, 1969).
- L’Itinéraire du Hussard (with Jean Carrière, second channel, 1969).
- Le Monde merveilleux de Paul Gilson (with Nino Frank, second channel, 1973), présenté hors Festival à Cannes.
- André Chamson ou La Terre promise (with Jean Carrière, second channel 1973).
- Jean Hugo ou le Reflet du Paradis (with Jacques Rouré, FR3, 1975).

==== Radio-interviews ====
- Cinq entretiens de Frédéric Jacques Temple avec Catherine Portevin, France Culture, émission À voix nue.

=== Correspondence ===
- Henry Miller, Frère Jacques. Lettres à Frédéric Jacques Temple, Éditions Finitude, 2012.

== About Frédéric Jacques Temple ==
- 1968: Jean Rousselot, Dictionnaire de la poésie française contemporaine. Paris, Larousse.
- 1969: Marcel Sauvage, Anthologie des poètes de l’ORTF. Paris, Denoël.
- 1973: Serge Brindeau, La Poésie contemporaine de langue française depuis 1945. Paris, Éditions Saint-Germain-des-Prés.
- 1982 and 1988 : Robert Sabatier, Histoire de la poésie française. La poésie du XXe, volumes 2 and 3, Paris, Albin Michel.
- 1985: Tristan Cabral, La Lumière et l’Exil. Anthologie des poètes du Sud de 1914 à nos jours. Le Temps Parallèle Édition.
- 1999: Frédéric Jacques Temple, revue Autre Sud issue 5, June
- 2000: À la rencontre de Frédéric Jacques Temple, symposium of Nanterre, 1999, dir. Claude Leroy, RITM issue 23, university Paris X-Nanterre, Publidix.
- 2001:
  - Claude Leroy, « Frédéric Jacques Temple », Dictionnaire de poésie de Baudelaire à nos jours (dir. Michel Jarrety). Paris, P.U.F
  - Rencontres avec FJT, avec un poème inédit, Grains d’ambre pour un komboloï, suivi de dix traductions, d’un entretien avec Jean-Louis Fauthoux et d’une bibliographie succincte par François Pic, Pau.
  - Les écrivains hommes de radio (1940–1970), communications et documents écrits et sonores réunis et présentés par Pierre-Marie-Héron. Montpellier, université Paul-Valéry, Centre d'étude du XX.
- 2003 :
  - Les écrivains et la radio, actes du colloque international de Montpellier (23-25 mai 2002) réunis et présentés par Pierre-Marie Héron, université Montpellier III/Institut national de l'audiovisuel.
  - Septimanie, Le livre en Languedoc-Roussillon, issue 12, Castries, mars.
- 2007 : Frédéric Jacques Temple, l'aventure de vivre, colloque de Saorge organisé par Béatrice Bonhomme, Laure Michel et Patrick Quillier, université de Nice-Sophia-Antipolis, 30 novembre et 1 December.
- Bastide, Bernard; Temple, Frédéric Jacques (2008). "Sans frontières". Balade dans le Gard;sur les pas des écrivains. Les écrivains vagabondent (in French). Paris: Alexandrines. pp. 210–217. ISBN 978-2-370890-01-6. Archived from the original on 2015-09-14.
- Velay, Serge; Boissard, Michel; Bernié-Boissard, Catherine (2009). Petit dictionnaire des écrivains du Gard (in French). Nîmes: Alcide. pp. 237–238–239.
- 2010: Frédéric Jacques Temple, l'aventure de vivre, version augmentée, études réunies et présentées par Colette Camelin. La Licorne / Presses universitaires de Rennes.
- 2012 : Jacqueline Assaël, Le mémorial des limules. Essai sur la poésie de Frédéric Jacques Temple. Suivi d'un dialogue avec le poète. Éditions de Corlevour.
- 2013: Revue Nunc 30, Frédéric Jacques Temple ou la poésie des sept points cardinaux. Dossier dirigé par Jacqueline Assael.
- 2014: Les univers de Frédéric Jacques Temple, volume coordonné par Pierre-Marie Héron et Claude Leroy, Montpellier, Presses universitaires de la Méditerranée, "Collection des Littératures". Avec des inédits ("Poèmes égarés"), des repères biographiques, une bibliographie détaillée et une abondante iconographie.
