= Grand prix de poésie de la SGDL =

The grand prix de poésie de la SGDL is a French literary award created by the Société des gens de lettres in 1983 in order to reward an author for the whole of his work. This award is given to the winner during the spring session of the company. It is endowed with a sum of 500 €.

== List of laureates ==
- 1983: Bernard Noel
- 1984: Géo Norge
- 1985: Rouben Mélik (autumn 84)
- 1986: Edmond Humeau (autumn 85)
- 1987: Claude Vigee
- 1988: Jacques Reda
- 1989: André Frénaud
- 1990: Andrée Chedid
- 1991: Jean-Claude Renard
- 1992: Pierre Oster
- 1993: Vénus Khoury-Ghata
- 1994: Marc Alyn
- 1995: Jean-Clarence Lambert
- 1996: Alain Bosquet
- 1997: Claude Esteban
- 1998: Philippe Jaccottet
- 1999: Guy Goffette and Jean Rousselot
- 2000: Michel Deguy
- 2001: Lionel Ray
- 2002: Richard Rognet
- 2003: Frédéric Jacques Temple
- 2004: Werner Lambersy
- 2005: Franck André Jamme
- 2006: William Cliff
- 2007: Jean Metellus
- 2008: Abdelkebir Khatibi, Poésie de l'aimance (La Différence)
- 2009: Jean Orizet, Le Regard et l'énigme, œuvre poétique 1958-2008 (Le Cherche-Midi)
- 2010: Philippe Delaveau, Le Veilleur amoureux, (Gallimard)
- 2011: Max Pons, Vers le silence (La Barbacane)
- 2012: Charles Dobzynski, La Mort à vif (L'Amourier), Je est un juif, roman (Orizons)
- 2013: Patrick Laupin, Œuvres poétiques, 2 volumes (Éditions La Rumeur libre)
- 2014: Robert Nedelec, Quatre-vingts entames en nu (Éditions Jacques Brémond)
- 2015: Paul Farellier, L'Entretien devant la nuit, Poèmes 1968-2013 (Les Hommes sans Épaules éditions)
- 2016: Michel Butor, Ruines d'Avenir, un livre tapisserie (Actes Sud/Ville d'Angers)
