= Jacques Izoard =

Belgian poet and essayist

- Born: Jacques Delmotte; 29 May 1936; Liège, Belgium
- Died: 19 July 2008 (aged 72); Liege, Belgium
- Occupations: essayist, poet

Jacques Izoard (29 May 1936 – 19 July 2008) was a Belgian poet and essayist. He was born Jacques Delmotte at Liège.

== Life ==
He taught French in secondary technical and vocational education for many years. Under the pseudonym Jacques Izoard, (from the mountain pass), he began writing poetry in 1962 with the release of a first opus: Ce manteau de pauvreté (This cloak of poverty).

Izoard's poetry is characterized by a simple structure and refined and the desire to sound out the words. His work, prolific, has a sixty collections of poetry and an essay on Andree Chedid. Summarizing his poetic system, Lionel Ray speaks of it as a secret and tender attachment to what is the limit of perceptible, but which may have the body

The two volumes of his complete works were published in editions by la Difference in 2006 and that same year, the University of Liège devoted a symposium.

The day after the funeral of his friend Gaston Compere, he died aged 72, suffered a heart attack at his home in the Liege neighborhood of Sainte-Marguerite.

== Host and mentor ==
He led the review of 25 (or M25) created by Robert Varlez in 1977, where he was joined by Frances Favretto in 1979. He inspired the "school of Liège" with the challenge was to publish contemporary poetry in the spirit of the magazine Odradek (30 numbers from 1972 to 1980). According to the expression of Kafka "Odradek" describes an object that moves all the time, and does not catch leaves.

Very attached to his city, he spent over 30 years of organizing in Liege Night of Poetry. Attentive to the poetry of others, he discovered among other Savitzkaya Eugene, with whom he shared his house, street Chevaufosse, and has encouraged many poets, writers and artists such as Nicolas Ancion, Karel Logist, Serge Delaive, William Cliff, Robert Varlez, Jean Marie Mathoul, Selçuk Mutlu or Ben Ares.

== Awards ==
- 1979 Mallarmé prize
- 1999 Prix Alain Bosquet, for Le Bleu et la poussière
- 2001 Prix triennal de poésie, for Le Bleu et la poussière

== Works ==
- "POÈMES THORACIQUES", Bon a Tirer, 2006
- Œuvres complètes, édition La Différence (établie, présentée et annotée par Gérald Purnelle).
  - Volume I, Poésie, 1951–1978, 992 p. (ISBN 2-7291-1617-6)
  - Volume II, Poésie, 1979–2000, 960 p. (ISBN 2-7291-1618-4)
- Ce manteau de pauvreté - poèmes et autres récits, Liège, Éditions de l'Essai, 1962.
- Les sources de feu brûlent le feu contraire, Bruxelles, Société des Écrivains, 1964
- Aveuglement Orphée, Paris, Guy Chambelland, 1967.
- Des lierres, des neiges, des chats, Bruxelles, Henry Fagne, 1968.
- Un chemin de sel pur (followed by) Aveuglément Orphée, Paris, Guy Chambelland, 1969.
- Le papier, l'aveugle, Liège, Éditions de l'Essai, 1970.
- Voix, vêtements, saccages, Paris, Bernard Grasset, 1971.
- Des laitiers, des scélérats, Paris, Saint-Germain-des-Prés, 1971.
- Six poèmes, Liège, Tête de Houille, 1972.
- La Maison des cent dormeurs, Paris, Gaston Puel, 1973.
- La Patrie empaillée, Paris, Bernard Grasset, 1973.
- Bègue, bogue, borgne, Waremme, Éditions de la revue Donner à voir, 1974.
- Le Poing près du c.ur, in Verticales 12, n° 21-22, Decazeville, 1974.
- Poèmes, Saint-Gengoux-le-National, Louis Dubost, 1974.
- La Maison dans le doigt, dans Cahiers de Roture, n° 4, Liège, 1974.
- Poulpes, papiers, Paris, Commune Mesure, 1975.
- Rue obscure (with Eugène Savitzkaya). Liège, Atelier de l'Agneau, 1975.
- Le Corps caressé, Paris, Commune Mesure, 1976.
- La Chambre d'Iris, Awan-Aywaille, Fonds de la Ville, 1976.
- Andrée Chédid (essays), Paris, Seghers, 1977.
- Vêtu, dévêtu, libre, Paris, Pierre Belfond, 1978.
- Plaisirs solitaires (with Eugène Savitzkaya), Liège, Atelier de l'Agneau, 1979.
- Avec la rouille et les crocs du renard, dans Douze poètes sans impatience, Paris, Luneau-Ascot, 1979.
- Enclos de nuit, Senningerberg (Grand-Duché de Luxembourg), Origine, 1980.
- Langue, Nantes, Cahiers du Pré Nian, 1980
- Petites merveilles, poings levés, Herstal, Atelier de l'Agneau, 1980.
- Frappé de cécité dans sa cité ardente. Liège, Atelier de la Soif étanche, 1980.
- Le Corps et l'image. Liège, « Aux dépens de l'artiste », 1980.
- Axe de l'oeil, Herstal, Atelier de l'Agneau, 1982.
- Pavois du bleu, Saint-Laurent-du-Pont (Isère), Le Verbe et l'Empreinte, 1983.
- Voyage sous la peau, Nantes, Pré Nian, 1983.
- M'avait il dit, dans La Lettre internationale, nE 16, printemps 1988.
- Sommeil d'encre, Ougrée, M25 productions, 1988.
- Corps, maisons, tumultes, Paris, Belfond, 1990.
- Ourthe sourde, S.L., MYRDDlN, 1991.
- Poèmes (with Andrée Chédid), Épinal, Ville d'Épinal, 1991.
- La patrie empaillée suivi de Vêtu, dévêtu, libre, Ed. Labor, coll. Espace Nord, 1992.
- Le Bleu et la poussière, éd. La Différence, 1998
- Dormir sept ans, éd. La Différence, 2001
- Vin rouge au poing, Amay, L'Arbre à paroles, 2001
- Les Girafes du Sud, éd. La Différence, 2003 (with Selçuk Mutlu)
- Tout mot tu, tout est dit, suivi de Traquenards, corps perdus, Châtelineau, Le Taillis Pré, 2004
- Petits crapauds du temps qui passe, St-Quentin-de-Caplong, Atelier de l'agneau, 2006 (with Michel Valprémy)
- Thorax, éd. PHI, 2007
- Lieux épars, éd. La Différence, 2008
