= Prix Mallarmé =

Académie

The Prix Mallarmé (Mallarmé Prize) is a poetry prize awarded each year by the Académie Mallarmé to a French speaking poet. To be eligible for the prize the poet must have published a piece in the year concerned, even though the prize does not reward a specific piece of poetry but the author's work all along his career as a whole. The prize may only be won once.

The prize is awarded on the occasion of the book fair which takes place in Brive-la-Gaillarde, in the département of Corrèze, région Limousin, France. The cash prize amounts to €3,811 (25,000 FF). Over the past three years it has been financed through sponsorship from the company ISS; previously it was sponsored by the Mairie of Brives.

== Winners ==
This is an incomplete list of authors having won the prize:

Year	Author	Published work nominated
2019	Claudine Bohi	Naître c'est longtemps
2018	Béatrice de Jurquet	Si quelqu’un écoute
2017	Philippe Mathy	Veilleur d'instants
2016	Gérard Bayo	Neige, followed by Vivante étoile
2015	Werner Lambersy	La Perte du temps
2014	Hubert Haddad	La Verseuse du matin
2013	Alain Duault	Les Sept Prénoms du vent
2012	Yves Namur	La Tristesse du figuier
2011	Annie Salager	Travaux de lumière
2010	Robert Marteau	Le Temps ordinaire
2009	Jean Max Tixier	Parabole des nuées
2008	Jean Ristat	Artémis chasse à courre, le sanglier, le cerf et le loup
2007	Seyhmus Dagtekin	Juste un pont sans feu
2006	Michel Butor	16 lustres
2005	Hélène Dorion	Ravir : les lieux
2004	Olivier Barbarant	Essais de voix malgré le vent
2003	Jean Portante	L'étrange langue
2002	Alain Veinstein	Tout se passe comme si
2000	André Schmitz	Incises, Incisions
1999	Benoît Conort	Main de nuit
1998	Mohamed Dib	L'Enfant-Jazz
1997	Marie Etienne	Roi des cent cavaliers
1996	Franck Venaille	Descente de l'Escaut
1995	Paul-Louis Rossi	Faïences
1992	Jacques Chessex	Les aveugles du seul regard
1990	André Velter	L'Arbre-seul
1989	Guy Goffette	Eloge pour une cuisine de province
1988	Jean Pérol	Asile exil
1987	Venus Khoury-Ghata	Monologue du mort
1986	Henri Meschonnic	Voyageurs de la voix
1984	Claude Esteban	Conjoncture du corps et du jardin
1981	Lionel Ray	Le corps obscur
1980	Yves de Bayser	
1979	Jacques Izoard	Vêtu, dévêtu, libre
1978	Jean Joubert	Les Poèmes - 1955-1975
1976	Andrée Chédid	Fraternité de la parole et Cérémonial de la violence
1942	Yanette Delétang-Tardif	Tenter de vivre
1940	Paul Bulliard	Chacun sa croix
1939	Jean Follain	Chants terrestres

== Académie Mallarmé ==
The Académie Mallarmé (Mallarmé Academy) was founded in 1937. It is a French not-for-profit association (known in French as an association loi de 1901, a "1901 law association"), founded in commemoration of Stéphane Mallarmé, by people who knew him.

Its main objective is the promotion of poetry, and for a long time it was presided over by Guillevic and Alain Bosquet. It consists of thirty French or French-speaking members and 15 foreign correspondents. Notable members of the Académie include Jean Orizet, Marie-Claire Bancquart, Lionel Ray, Claude-Michel Cluny, François Montmaneix, Robert Sabatier, Jean Rousselot, Michel Deguy, Charles Dobzinski, Philippe Jones, Jean-Michel Maulpoix, Henri Meschonnic, Pierre Oster, Vénus Khoury-Ghata; and the foreign correspondents are Ismail Kadaré, Seamus Heaney and Andrei Vossnessenski.

The Academy seeks to promote poetry and organises poetry readings as well as the annual award of the Mallarmé prize. The Academy also seeks to promote the work of Stéphane Mallarmé, which is now in the public domain (since he died more than a hundred years ago).
