= Paul-Louis Rossi =

French critic and poet (1933–2025)

Paul Louis Rossi
- Born: 4 November 1933; Nantes, France
- Died: 6 February 2025 (aged 91)
- Occupation: Poet • Novelist • Author
- Awards: Mallarmé Prize in 1995

Paul Louis Rossi (4 November 1933 – 6 February 2025) was a French arts critic and poet.

== Life ==
Paul Louis Rossi was born in Nantes, Brittany on 4 November 1933. His grandparents, Queffelec, spoke Breton and Cornish. His father was Italian, of the Venice area. He was shot by the Germans in 1943 in Tübingen, when Rossi was ten years old.

Rossi published a booklet entitled Liturgy for the night in 1958, during the Algerian War. He came to work early to Paris; he wanted to become a journalist. He wrote music reviews in Jazz Magazine and in the Cahiers du jazz, and film criticism: "The Arbitrary", dedicated to Robert Bresson, published in Camera Pen. He collaborated with French Letters and the journal Change, directed by Jean-Pierre Faye. In the 1970s he made, with Jacques Roubaud, Lionel Ray, and Pierre Lartigue, exercises on the world Oulipo: The Inimaginaires. His travel book St. Ursula was published by Gallimard in 1973.

Rossi lived in Paris and died on 6 February 2025 at the age of 91.

== Awards ==
- 1995 Mallarmé prize

== Works ==
- Inscapes. Le Temps qu'il fait. 1994. ISBN 978-2-86853-197-1.
- Elévation de l'enclume (1997)
- Escalation of the anvil (1997)
- Rossi, Paul Louis (1998). Les nuits de Romainville. ISBN 978-2-86853-300-5.
- Philippe Beck; Yves Di Manno; Paul Louis Rossi (2000). Le Colloque de nuit. Le temps qu'il fait. ISBN 978-2-86853-338-8.
- La Voyageuse immortelle (2001)
- Le Voyage de Sainte-Ursule (Gallimard, 1973)
- La Traversée du Rhin (Hachette POL, 1981)
- Crossing the Rhine (POL Hachette, 1981)
- Les États provisoires. POL. 1984. ISBN 978-2-86744-018-2.
- Nantes. Champ Vallon. 1987. ISBN 978-2-903528-89-8.
- Régine (Julliard, 1990)
- Cose Naturali (Éd. Unes, 1991)
- La Montagne de Kaolin (Julliard, 1992)
- L'Ouest surnaturel. Hatier, coll. Brèves Littérature. 1993. ISBN 978-2-218-04994-1.
- La Palanchina. Julliard. 1993. ISBN 978-2-260-01020-3.
- Le Fauteuil rouge (Julliard, 1994)
- Faïences. Flammarion. 1995. ISBN 978-2-08-067141-7.
- Vocabulaire de la modernité littéraire. Minerve. 1996. ISBN 978-2-86931-082-7.
- Le Vieil homme et la nuit (Julliard, 1997)
- André Lambotte (ARTGO, Brussels, 1997)
- La vie secrète de Fra Angelico (Bayard, 1997)
- Cose Naturali (Éd. Ergo Pers Gent, 1997)
- Quand Anna murmurait. Flammarion. 1999. ISBN 978-2-08-067707-5.
- Fuscelli (Éd. Tandem, Belgium, 2000)
