= Olivier Barbarant =

French poet

- Born: March 5, 1966 (age 60); Bar-sur-Aube, France
- Occupation: Poet

Olivier Barbarant (born 5 March 1966 Bar-sur-Aube, France) is a French poet.

== Life ==
He lived in Paris. Since 1994, he has been living in Saint-Quentin, Picardy, where he teaches school, currently at the Lycée Lakanal in Sceaux.

In 1995, he met Veronique Elzière called Berenice in his books. He adopted Cosette in July 1995.

== Awards ==
- 2004 Mallarmé prize

== Works ==
=== Poetry ===
- Les parquets du ciel. Editions Champ Vallon. 1992. ISBN 978-2-87673-140-0.
- Douze lettres d'amore au soldat inconnu. Editions Champ Vallon. 1993. ISBN 978-2-87673-164-6.
- Aragon: la mémoire et l'excès. Editions Champ Vallon. 1997. ISBN 978-2-87673-226-1.
- Odes dérisoires et quelques autres un peu moins. Editions Champ Vallon. 1998. ISBN 978-2-87673-272-8.

=== Criticism, Essays, Editor ===
- Temps mort: journal imprécis, 1986-1998. Editions Champ Vallon. 1999. ISBN 978-2-87673-292-6.
- Hourra l'Oural: poème. Stock. 1998. ISBN 978-2-234-04951-2.
- Les parquets du ciel. Editions Champ Vallon. 1992. ISBN 978-2-87673-140-0.
- Essais de voix malgré le vent. Editions Champ Vallon. 2004. ISBN 978-2-87673-384-8.
- Louis Aragon (2007). Olivier Barbarant (ed.). Oeuvres poétiques complètes. Gallimard. ISBN 978-2-07-011890-8.
- Je ne suis pas Victor Hugo. Editions Champ Vallon. 2007. ISBN 978-2-87673-455-5.
