= Max Pons =

French poet and editor (1927–2021)

- Born: 24 February 1927; Fumel, France
- Died: 10 April 2021 (aged 94); Montcabrier, France
- Occupations: Poet; Editor

Max Pons (24 February 1927 – 10 April 2021) was a French poet and editor. He was editor-in-chief of the newspaper La Barbacane.

== Awards ==
- Grand prix de poésie de la SGDL for Vers le Silence (2011)

== Works ==
- Bonaguil, château de rêves (1959)
- Évocation du vieux Fumel (1959)
- Calcaire (1970)
- Écriture des pierres, étude sur des graffitis XVIe et XVIIe siècles (1971)
- Voyage en chair, Regards sur Bonaguil (1975)
- Formes et paroles (1978)
- Écritures des Pierres (1979)
- Nouveaux regards sur Bonaguil (1979)
- Vie et légende d'un grand château fort (1987)
- Le Château des mots (1988)
- Autour de Jean Follain et de quelques autres (1991)
- À propos de Douarnenez (1999)
- Poésie de Bretagne, aujourd'hui (2002)
- Les Armures du silence (2002)
- Une Bastide en Quercy : Montcabrier (2009)
- Vers le Silence, itinéraire poétique (2011)
