= Jean Pérol =

French novelist and poet (born 1932)

Jean Pérol (born 1932 Vienne) is a French novelist and poet.

== Life ==
He grew up in south-eastern France where he spent his childhood and adolescence. He conducted his graduate studies in Lyon.

He left for Japan in 1961. He returned to France in 1989, before moving to Kabul, Afghanistan for two years. He also lived for two years in Louisiana in New Orleans, and then two years in New York City.

== Awards ==
- Award for Poetry Roger Kowalski of the city of Lyon.
- 1988 Mallarmé prize for exile and asylum for all his work.
- Au.tr.es Prize, for his novel A memorable was in 1998.

== Works ==
- Le soleil se couche à Nippori, La Différence, 2007.
- À part et passager, La Différence, 2004.
- Un été mémorable, Gallimard, 1998. Prix Rhône-Alpes pour le Livre, 1998.
- Ruines-mères, La Différence, 1996. Réédition Le Cherche-Midi, 1998.
- Regards d'encre - Écrivains japonais 1966-1986, La Différence, 1995.
- La Nouvelle-Orléans. Champ Vallon. 1992. ISBN 978-2-87673-137-0.
- Imaï, La Différence, 1990.
- Pouvoir de l'ombre, La Différence, 1989.
- Asile exil, La Différence, 1987.
- Tokyo. Champ Vallon. 1986. ISBN 978-2-903528-70-6.
- Histoire contemporaine, Gallimard, 1982.
- Morale provisoire, Gallimard, 1978.
- Maintenant les soleils (journal, poèmes), Gallimard, 1972.
- Ruptures, Gallimard, 1970.
- Le Cœur véhément, Gallimard, 1968.
- D'un pays lointain, Shichosha (Japon), 1965.
- Le Point vélique, Guy Chambelland, 1961.
- L'Atelier, Guy Chambelland, 1961.
- Le Feu du gel, éditions Armand Henneuse, 1959.
- Le Cœur de l'olivier, éditions Armand Henneuse, 1957.
- Sang et raisons d'une présence, Seghers, 1953.

=== Anthology ===
- Graham Dunstan Martin, ed. (1972). Anthology of contemporary French poetry. Edinburgh University Press.
