= Mathieu Bénézet =

French writer and poet (1946–2013)

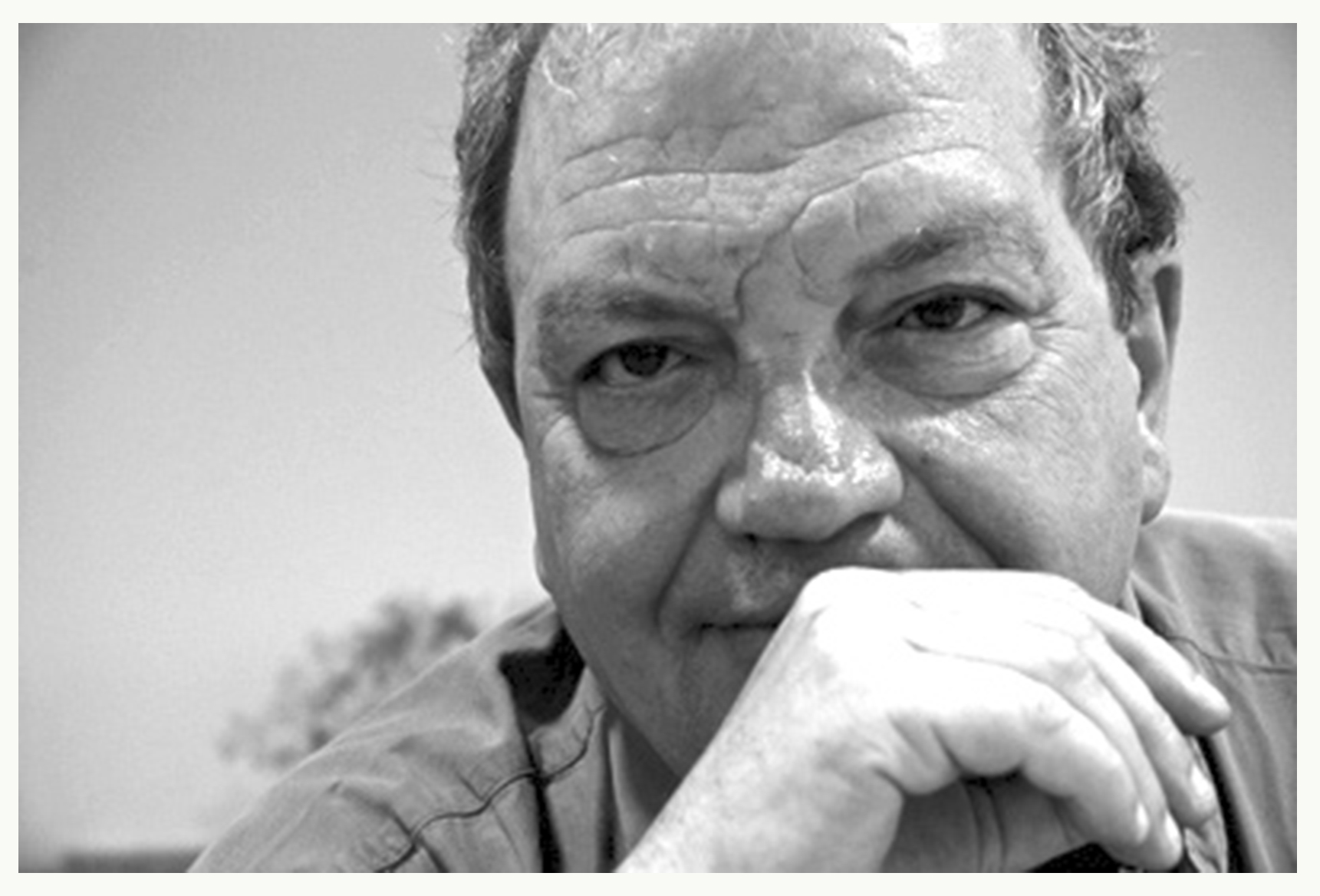
Mathieu Benezet

Mathieu Bénézet (7 February 1946 in Perpignan, Pyrénées-Orientales, – 12 July 2013 in Paris) was a French writer and poet.

== Biography ==
=== Writer ===
Bénézet's literary work is protean. Recognized primarily as one of the most important poets of his generation, he is also the author of numerous essays, texts in prose (mixing creation and reflections) and novels. He questions every discipline he invests. He also develops elegiac, lyrical forms, short or long poems, the dramatic poem, and so on. Never didactic (rather upsetting because upset), his poetry is crossed by his aesthetic or philosophical reflections.

Marqued, a young man, by his meeting with André Breton and Louis Aragon, begun writing works that attempted a synthesis between the two authors literature. These works helped carve a path for his first books to take off and eventually lead him to playing a central role in the 70s and 80s with poets such as Jacques Dupin and Anne-Marie Albiach. His love of poetry commanded his advances in his fields and his multiple support manifested as editor and essayist as well as man of radio.

In 2013, he was awarded the Grand prix de poésie de l'Académie française for his life achievement in poetry.

=== Editor and radio personality ===
Bénézet created several magazines such as Empreintes (1963–1965), Première Livraison (with Philippe Lacoue-Labarthe) and Digraphe (from 1976 to 1981, with Jean Ristat).

He was an éditor at Flammarion, Seghers and Comp'Act.

In addition he directed several programs on France Culture, including Entre-revues and, until 2009, Reconnaissance à....

== Publications ==
- 1968: L’Histoire de la peinture en trois volumes, Éditions Gallimard, prefaced by Aragon
- 1970: Biographies, Gallimard
- 1976: Dits et récits du mortel, Ménippée, Flammarion
- 1978: L’Imitation de Mathieu Bénézet, melodrama, Flammarion
- 1979: La Fin de l’homme, unfinished novel, Flammarion
- 1979: Ceci est mon corps, 1, melange, Flammarion
- 1981: Pantin, canal de l’Ourcq, novel, Flammarion
- 1984: Choses parmi les choses, essay to see, Ubacs
- 1984: Le Travail d’amour, poetry, Flammarion
- 1986: Ceci est mon corps, 2, miscellanées, Flammarion
- 1987: Roman journalier, prose, Flammarion
- 1988: Votre solitude, poetry, Seghers
- 1988: L’Instant d'une quantité de parole, narrative, Éd. Comp'Act
- 1990: Les XXXX followed by Trente-Neuf Quatrains, poetry, Éd. Comp'Act
- 1991: Ubacs. Numéro 10. Mathieu Bénézet, Éditions Ubacs, Rennes
- 1994: L’Océan jusqu’à toi, rime, Flammarion
- 1996: Ode à la poésie, Éd. William Blake and Co
- 1996: André Breton, rêveur définitif, essay to read, Éditions du Rocher
- 1997: Simples considérations. Considérations simple, with Alain Coulange, Éd. du Rocher
- 1997: Eh ! L’homme qui fait des hommes..., essay to see, Adélie
- 1998: Détails apostilles, Flammarion
- 1998: Orphée, imprécation, Éd. Le Bel Aujourd'hui
- 1998: 'L’instant d’une quantité de parole, narrative, Éditions Comp’Act
- 1999: Moi, Mathieu Bas-Vignons, fils de..., novel, Actes Sud
- 2000: L’Aphonie de Hegel, poetry, Obsidian
- 2000: L’Homme au jouet d’enfant, Ubacs
- 2002: Naufrage, naufrage, novel, Éditions Léo Scheer
- 2002: Et nous n’apprîmes rien : poésie (1962-1979), Flammarion
- 2002: Le Roman de la langue, essay, followed by Écrire encore, 1997, Horlieu
- 2003: Images vraies, petit roman, le préau des Collines
- 2004: Tancrède, novel, Léo Scheer
- 2005: Ceci est mon corps, mélanges & miscellanées, Flammarion/Léo Scheer
- 2005: Mais une galaxie, une anthologie, 1977-2000, Obsidian & Le Temps qu'il fait, (Prix Antonin-Artaud)
- 2007: La Terrasse de Leopardi, Propos 2
- 2008: Ne te confie qu’à moi, Flammarion
- 2009: Jeunesse & Vieillesse & Jeunesse, Obsidian
- 2009: Après moi, le déluge, Léo Scheer
- 2009: Pourquoi ce corps que je n’ai pas, Fissile
- 2010: Il vient d'un enfant dans un autre livre, L’arachnoïde
- 2011: H. O. ou Hamlet omelette, Léo Scheer
- 2012: Le Roman des revues, essay, Ent'revues
- 2013: La Chemise de Pétrarque, Obsidian
- 2014: Premier Crayon, Flammarion
- 2014: Les Mêmes, désolées, Fissile
- 2014: Le Ciel c'est l'accident, L'arachnoïde

Anthology

- 2012: Œuvre, 1965-2010, series "Mille & une pages", Flammarion
