= Franck Venaille =

French writer and poet (1936–2018)

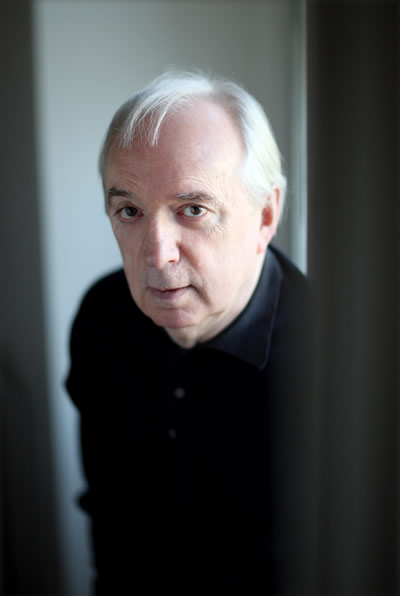
Franck Venaille

Franck Venaille (1936 – 23 August 2018) was a French poet and writer. His poetry is characterized by its expressive power, seeking to bring out the animal side of man, his impulses and anxieties.

== Life ==
Born into a Catholic family in the XIth arrondissement of Paris, Franck Venaille was permanently marked by his military service during the Algerian War. This test resurfaces from time to time in his poetry, even in its most recent works. It forms the explicit subject of The War of Algeria (1978) and Algeria (2004).

In his childhood, he stayed in Belgium for three months, starting a deep attraction for Flanders. This is the recurring background of his poetry, particularly his major work, The Descent of Scheldt (1995).

He is close to painters Peter Klasen and Jacques Monory, who exerted a significant influence on his work. He works at the magazine Poetic Action (1960) and Orange Export Ltd. (1980). He also founded the journals Chorus (1968) and Mr. Bloom (1978). From 1974, he worked for France Culture, working in particular with the issue Les Nuits magnétiques.

== Awards ==
He received numerous awards, including the Mallarmé prize in 1996 for The Descent of the Scheldt. Venaille's most recent book, It, won the 2009 Robert Ganzo Prize and the 2009 Alain Bosquet Prize.

== Works ==
- Identity papers, PJO, 1966.
- The thunderstruck Apprentice, PJO, 1969, Ubacs, 1986, The Writings of Forges, 1987.
- Why are you crying, saying why are you crying? Because the sky is blue ... Because the sky is blue!, PJO, 1972, The Feugraie Workshop, 1984.
- Two (in collaboration with Jacques Monory), offprint, 1973.
- Caballero Hotel, Les Editions de Minuit, 1974.
- The War in Algeria, Les Editions de Minuit, 1978.
- As a torn book,inhatredof poetry, Christian Bourgois, 1979.
- Jack to Jack,Luneau-Ascot, 1981.
- The procession of penitents,Mr. Bloom, 1983.
- La tentation de la sainteté: roman. Flammarion. 1985. ISBN 978-2-08-064822-8.
- Trieste. Champ Vallon. 1985. ISBN 978-2-903528-61-4.
- L'apprenti foudroyé: poèmes, 1966-1986. UBACS. 1986.
- The spoiled Children, in The Missing Diplomats of Cyril Connolly, Salvy, 1989.
- Cavalier, cheval. Paris: Imprimerie Nationale. 1989. ISBN 978-2-11-081006-9., Le Castor Astral, The Writings of Forges, 2003.
- Opera buffa,Printing National Literature, 1989.
- Umberto Saba, Seghers, Poets of Today, 1989.
- The Great Operas of Mozart, Printing Office, 1989.
- Frans van Etterbeek, in "Directions in Literary Lozère: Cevennes, Jacques Bremond, 1989.
- KLASEN, opera in three acts and fifteen scenes, Marval, Galerie Fanny Guillon Lafaille, 1989.
- The Sultan of Istanbul, Salvy, Les Ecrits des Forges, 1991.
- Pierre Morhange, Seghers, "Poets of Today, 1992.
- La halte belge. Cadex éditions. 1994. ISBN 978-2-905910-47-9.
- The Manin war, Paroles d'Aube, 1995, La Renaissance du livre, 2000.
- The DescentScheldt, Obsidian, 1995.
- Write cons father, Jacques Bremond, 1996.
- The Horse Erasmus, in Second homes, Cadex, 1996.
- Captain anxiety animal, Obsidiane - Weather, 1998.
- The Court horses, the crossbow -Gallimard, 2000.
- Tragic, Obsidian, 2001.
- Dead Hooray!, Obsidian, 2003.
- Algeria, Melville / Leo Scheer, 2004.
- Pierre Jean Jouve. The serious man, Jean-Michel Place, "Poetry", 2004.
- Chaos, Mercure de France, 2007.
- It, Mercure de France, 2009.

=== Translations ===
- Jean-Yves Reuzeau, ed. (1999). French poets of today. Guernica Editions. ISBN 978-0-920717-82-0.

== Research ==
- François Boddaert, Venaille Franck, Jean-Michel Place, "Poetry", 2005.
- Review Le Matricule des anges, No. 37, December 2001/février 2002.
- Review Europe, No. 938-939, June–July 2007.
- Review Europe (survey and interview), No. 859-860, November–December 2000.
