= André Velter =

French poet

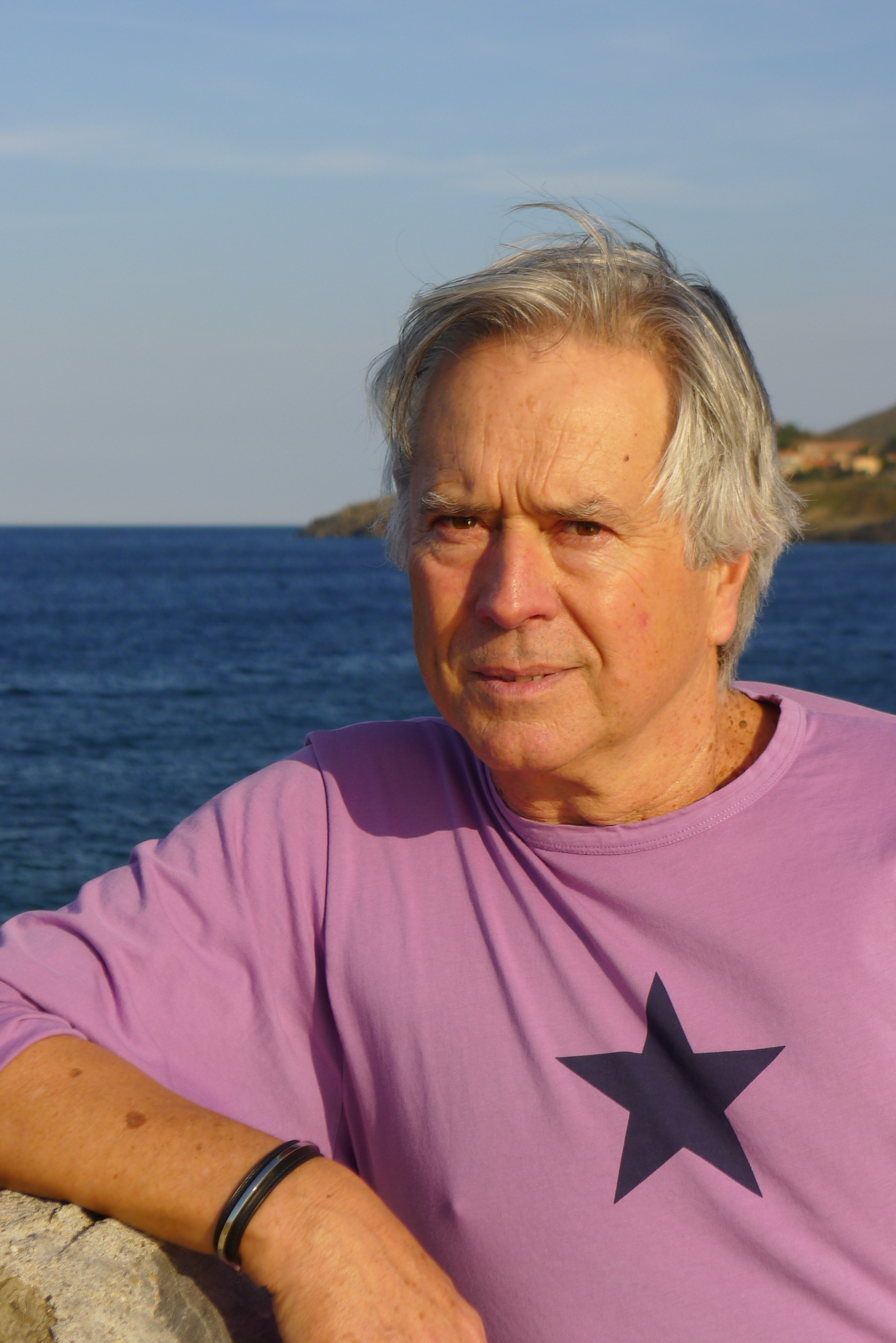
AV Collioure septembre 2011 Copyright Sophie Nauleau

André Velter (born 1945), French poet, was born in Signy-l'Abbaye in the Ardennes région and was educated in Charleville and Paris. Having begun his first journeys in 1955 through Europe and the Middle East, he has traveled through Afghanistan, Tibet, China and India. As a result, his poetry displays a varied and colorful relation to the places, sounds and rhythms of the cultures he has visited.

Velter has experimented with improvised songs, polyphonic poetry, and has composed a rock oratorio. His work with France Culture combined with frequent poetry recitals, alone or with dance and instrumentation, shows commitment to poetry as an actively performed medium.

His work has been translated into many languages and is also available on compact disc.

== Awards ==
- 1996 Prix Goncourt
- 1990 Mallarmé prize
- 2021: Prix Guillaume Apollinaire (for Séduire l’univers, précédé d'À contre-peur, Gallimard)

== Selected bibliography ==
- Aisha, Gallimard, 1966
- Du Gange à Zanzibar, Gallimard, 1993 (Louise Labé prize)
- Les poètes du chat noir (Anthology), Gallimard, 1996
- L'Arbre seul, Gallimard, 1998 (Mallarmé prize)
- L'Amour extrême, Gallimard, 2000
- Songs of Love and War: Afghan Women's Poetry, ed. Sayd Majrouh, Other Press, 2003
- La Faute à qui, CD Elios Productions and les Editions Thélème, 2004
- Zingaro suite équestre et un piaffer plus dans l'inconnu, Gallimard, 2005
