= Franck André Jamme =

French poet (1947–2020)

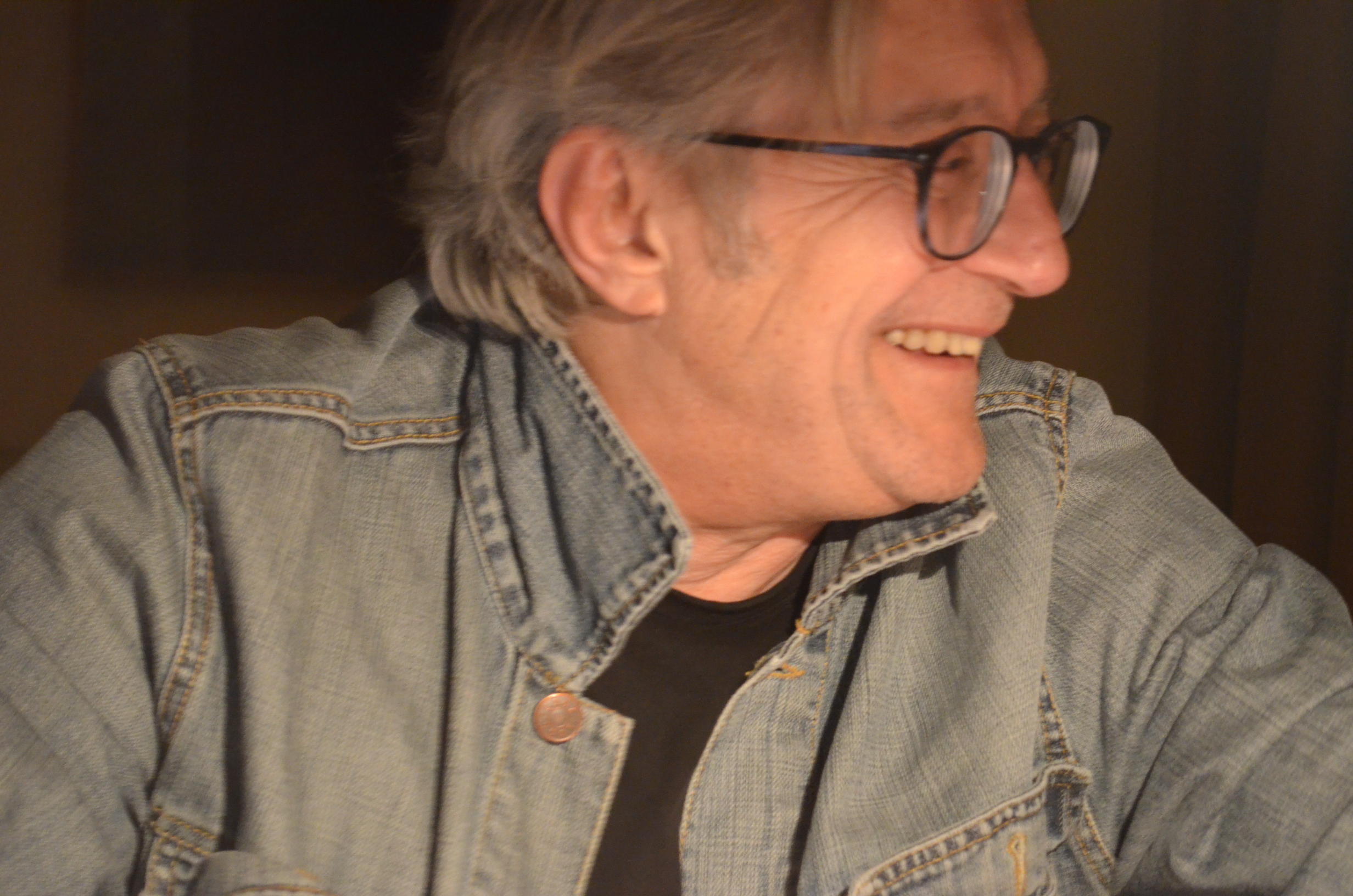
- Born: 21 November 1947
- Died: 1 October 2020 (aged 72)
- Occupation: Poet

Franck André Jamme (21 November 1947 – 1 October 2020) was a French poet.

== Biography ==
He specialized in the tribal arts of contemporary India, La Pléiade, and René Char. Since 1981, he has published twelve collections containing poems and fragments. He was also a translator of, among others, Lokenath Bhattacharya and Udayan Vajpeyi.

For his works, Jamme received the Grand prix de poésie de la SGDL in 2005. The work Forêt sensible was based on Jamme's Nouveaux exercices and Au secret, the latter of which was written specifically for the company Souffleurs, commandos poétiques.

Franck André Jamme died on 1 October 2020 at the age of 72.

== Bibliography ==
- L'Ombre des biens à venir (1981)
- Absence de résidence et pratique du songe (1985)
- La Récitation de l'oubli (1986)
- Un diamant sans étonnement (1998)
- Nouveaux exercices (2002)
- Extraits de la vie des scarabées (2004)
- De la Distraction (2005)
- Mantra des réalités invisibles et des doigts troués de la vue (2006)
- Au secret (2010)
- Tantra Song: Tantric Painting from Rajashtan (editor) (2011)
