= Benoît Conort =

French poet and literary critic

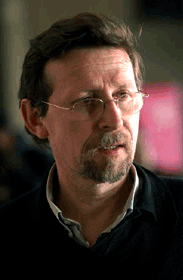
Benoît Conort

Benoît Conort (born 1956) is a French poet and literary critic. He also teaches at the University of Paris X - Nanterre, under the department of modern literature.

He serves on the editorial board of the journal New Series where he published numerous poems and reviews.

== Awards ==
- 1988: Fénéon prize for For the island to come
- 1988: Francis Jammes prize for For the island to come
- 1992: Tristan Tzara prize for Beyond Circles
- 1999: Mallarmé prize for Night Hand

== Works ==
- Pour une île à venir: poème. Gallimard. 1988. ISBN 978-2-07-071323-3.
- Au-delà des cercles: poèmes. Gallimard. 1992. ISBN 978-2-07-072629-5.
- Main de Nuit. Editions Champ Vallon. 1998. ISBN 978-2-87673-271-1.
- Cette vie est la nôtre: rhapsodie. Editions Champ Vallon. 2001. ISBN 978-2-87673-320-6.
- Pierre Jean Jouve: mourir en poésie : la mort dans l'œuvre poétique de Pierre Jean Jouve. Presses Univ. Septentrion. 2002. ISBN 978-2-85939-751-7.
- Écrire dans le noir. Editions Champ Vallon. 2006. ISBN 978-2-87673-432-6.
