= Henri Meschonnic =

French poet

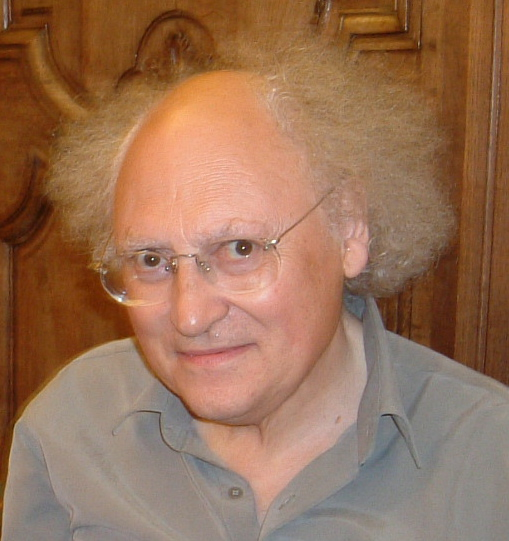

Henri Meschonnic (18 September 1932, in Paris – 8 April 2009, in Villejuif) was a French poet, linguist, essayist and translator. He is remembered today as both a theoretician of language and as a translator of the Old Testament. The 710-page Critique du rythme, probably remains his most famous theoretical work. As a translator of the Old Testament he published many volumes, including Les cinq rouleaux in 1970 (Song of Songs, Ruth, Lamentations, Ecclesiastes, Esther); Jona et le signifiant errant in 1998 (Jonah); Gloires in 2000 (Psalms); Au commencement in 2002 (Genesis); Les Noms in 2003 (Exodus); Et il a appelé in 2005 (Leviticus); and Dans le désert in 2008 (Numbers).

== Awards ==
- 1972 Max Jacob International Poetry Prize
- 1986 Mallarmé prize
- 2006 Prix de Littérature Nathan Katz pour l’ensemble de l’œuvre
- 2007 International Grand Prix de poesie Guillevic-ville of Saint-Malo

== Bibliography ==
- Henri Meschonnic, Proposizioni per una poetica della traduzione [1973], translated by Mirella Conenna and Domenico D'Oria, in "Il lettore di provincia", n° 44, 1981, pp. 23–31; then in Siri Nergaard (ed.), Teorie contemporanee della traduzione, Milan, Bompiani, 1995 (2nd ed. 2002), pp. 265–281. ISBN 88-452-2470-8
- Henri Meschonnic, Ethics and Politics of Translating [2007], Benjamins Translation Library 91, translated and edited by Pier-Pascale Boulanger, Amsterdam, John Benjamins Publishing Company, 2011, ISBN 978-90-272-2439-2
- Henri Meschonnic, The Henri Meschonnic Reader, edited by Marko Pajević, translated by Pier-Pascale Boulanger, Andrew Eastman, John E. Joseph, David Nowell Smith, Marko Pajević, and Chantal Wright, Edinburgh, Edinburgh University Press, 2019, ISBN 978-14-744-4596-2
