= Vénus Khoury-Ghata =

Lebanese writer and poet (1937–2026)

- فينوس خوري غاتا
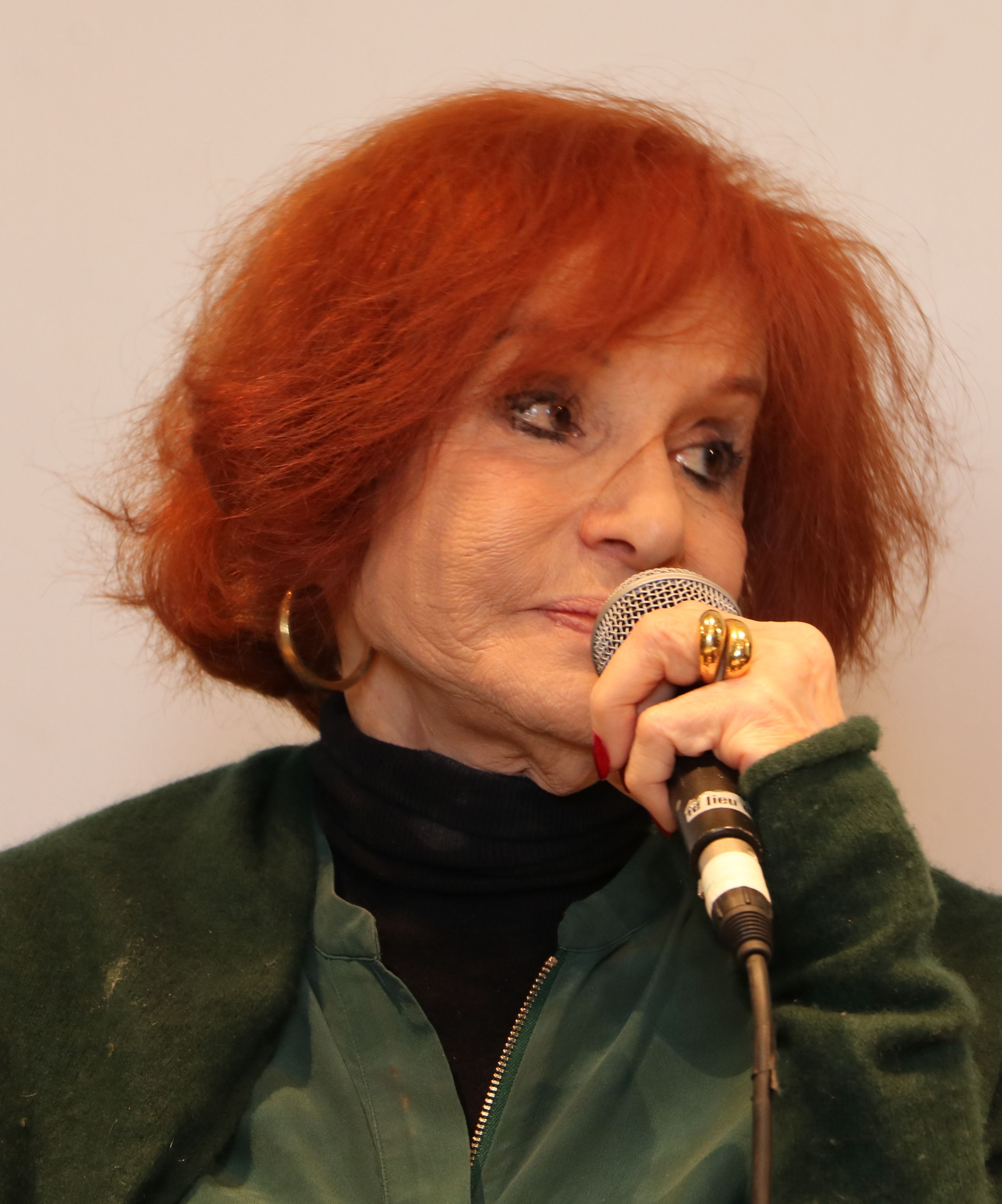
- Khoury-Ghata in 2017
- Born: 23 December 1937; Bsharri, Lebanon
- Died: 28 January 2026 (aged 88); Paris, France
- Occupations: Poet, writer
- Spouse: Jean Ghata
- Relatives: May Menassa (sister)

Vénus Khoury-Ghata (23 December 1937 – 28 January 2026) was a French-Lebanese poet and writer.

== Early life ==
Vénus Khoury-Ghata was born into a Maronite family, the daughter of a French-speaking soldier and a peasant mother. She was the older sister of the author May Menassa. In 1959, she won the Miss Beirut Pageant.

She emigrated to France to escape the war in Lebanon and married French-Turkish doctor Jean Ghata, son of the Turkish manuscript illuminator (and not calligrapher, as claimed by her daughter) Rikkat Kunt and her second husband, Fahreddin Ghata (born Çağatay). She lived in Paris from 1972 and published several novels and collections of poems.

Her daughter Yasmine Ghata is also a renowned writer.

== Career ==
Vénus Khoury-Ghata undertook literary studies at L'École Supérieure Des Lettres de Beirut. She published her first literary collection in 1966 and 1967 "Terres Stagnantes", "Chez Seghers", and then in 1971 she published her first novel, "Les Inadaptés".

In 2009, she received the Grand Prix de Poésie of the French Academy and the Goncourt Prize for Poetry in 2011.

In 2018, she became a member of the Parliament of French-speaking writers alongside many writers, including Sedef Ecer, Paula Jacques and Khadi Hane.

== Death ==
Khoury-Ghata died on 28 January 2026, at the age of 88.

== Literary awards ==
- Guillaume Apollinaire Prize for The Shadows and Their Cries (1980)
- Mallarmé Prize for Monologue du mort (1987)
- Jules-Supervielle Prize for Personal Anthology
- Prix Nice-Baie-des-Anges for Le Moine, l'ottoman and the wife of the great treasurer
- SGDL Grand Prize for Poetry (1993) for all of her work
- Jules-Janin Prize of the French Academy (2005)
- Grand Prize for Poetry of the French Academy (2009)
- Guillevic Grand Prize for Poetry of Saint-Malo (2010)
- Goncourt Prize for Poetry for her body of work (2011)
- Pierrette-Micheloud Poetry Prize for Where are the trees going? (2012)
- Renaudot Pocket Book Prize for The fiancée was on the back of a donkey (2015)
- Geneviève Moll Biography Prize for The Last Days of Mandelstam (2017)

== Honours ==
- Grand Officer of the National Order of Merit (2023)
- Commander of the Order of Arts and Letters (2022)
- Knight of the Legion of Honour (15 December 2000)
- Officer of the Legion of Honour (13 July 2010)
- Commander of the Legion of Honour (13 June 2017)

== Works ==
- Les visages inachevés, (Unfinished faces) 1966
- Les inadaptés, (The Maladjusted ones) novel, Le Rocher, 1971
- Au Sud du silence, (South of Silence) poems, Saint Germain des Prés, 1975
- Terres stagnantes, (Stagnant Lands) poems, Seghers
- Dialogue à propos d’un Christ ou d’un acrobate, (Dialogue about a Christ or an acrobat) novel, Les Editeurs Français Réunis, 1975
- Alma, cousue main ou Le Voyage immobile, (Alma, Sewed Hand or the Immobile Trip) R. Deforges, 1977
- Les ombres et leurs cris, (Shadows and their Screams) poems, Belfond, 1979
- Qui parle au nom du jasmin ?, (Who Talks in the Name of Jasmine?) Les Editeurs Français Réunis, 1980
- Le fils empaillé, (The Stupid Son) Belfond, 1980
- Un faux pas du soleil, (Sun Mistake) poems, Belfond, 1982
- Vacarme pour une lune morte, (Muddle for a Dead Moon) novel, Flammarion, 1983
- Les morts n’ont pas d’ombre, (Words Have No Shadows) novela Flammarion, 1984
- Mortemaison, (Deathhouse) novel, Flammarion, 1986
- Monologue du Mort, (Monologue of a Dead Man) novel, Belfond, 1986
- Leçon d’arithmétique au grillon, (Lesson about Arithmetic for a Cricket) poems for children, Milan, 1987
- Bayarmine, novel, Flammarion, 1988
- Les fugues d’Olympia, (Escapes from Olumpus) novel, Régine Deforges/Ramsay, 1989
- Fables pour un peuple d’argile, Un lieu sous la voûte, Sommeil blanc, (Fables for Clay People, A Place under the Vault, White Dream) poems, Belfond, 1992
- La maîtresse du notable (the Command of the Remarkable Man) novel, Seghers, 1992
- Ils, (They) poems, Amis du musée d’art moderne, 1993
- Les fiancés du Cap-Ténès, (Cap-Ténès’ Fiancés) novel, Lattès, Lattès 1995
- Anthologie personnelle, (Personal Anthology) poems, Actes Sud, 1997
- Une maison au bord des larmes, (A House at the Tearside) novel, Balland, 1998
- La maestra, (The Teacher) 1996, collection Babel, 2001
- Elle dit, Les sept brins de chèvrefeuille de la sagesse, (She Says, Seven Blades of Wisdom Honeysuckle) poems, Balland, 1999
- La voix des arbres, (Voice of Trees) poems for children Cherche-Midi, 1999
- Alphabets de sable, (Sand Alphabets) poems, illustrated by Matta, tirage limité, Maeght, 2000
- Le Fleuve, Du seul fait d’exister, (The River, The Simple Fact of Existing) with Paul Chanel Malenfant, Trait d’Union, 2000.
- Version des oiseaux, (Bird Version) poems, illustrated by Velikovic, François Jannaud, 2000
- Privilège des morts, (Privilege of Dead) novel, Balland, 2001
- Compassion des pierres, (Compassion of Stones) poemas, La Différence, 2001
- Zarifé la folle, (Mad Zarifé) François Jannaud, 2001
- Le Moine, l’ottoman et la femme du grand argentier, (The Monk, The Ottoman Man and The Eminent Algerian’s Wife) novel, Actes Sud, 2003
- Quelle est la nuit parmi les nuits, (Which is the Night of Nights) Mercure de France, 2004
- Six poèmes nomades, (Six Nomad Poemas) with Diane de Bournazel, Al Manar, 2005
- La Maison aux orties, (Nettle House) Actes Sud, 2006
- Sept pierres pour la femme adultère, (Seven Stones for Adulterous Women) roman, Mercure de France, 2007
