= Gérard Bayo =

French poet and writer

- Born: 20 July 1936; Bordeaux, France
- Died: 3 May 2023 (aged 86); Paris, France
- Occupations: poet and writer

Gérard Bayo (20 July 1936 – 3 May 2023) was a French poet and writer. He was awarded the Prix Antonin-Artaud in 1977 for Un Printemps difficile.

He also translated the Romanian poets Ana Blandiana and Horia Bădescu, and has written several studies on Arthur Rimbaud.

== Works ==
- 1956: Nostalgies pour paradis, ill. de Bernard Locca, Paris, Éditions José Millas-Martin, series "Paragraphes, 48 p. BnF 317791416
- 1961: L’Attente inconnue, drawings by Nicolas Damianakis, Bordeaux, Les Nouveaux Cahiers de jeunesse, 32 p. BnF 32915949f
- 1962: Le Pain de vie, Dijon, Éditions Georges Chambelland, 56 p. BnF 32915950n
- 1971: Les Pommiers de Gardelegen, Paris, Librairie Saint-Germain-des-Prés, coll. "Le Pont de l’Épée", 72 p. BnF 354072318
- 1975: Un Printemps difficile, Paris, Éditions Georges Chambelland, coll. "Le Pont de l’Épée" 114 p. BnF 34579598b

- Prix Antonin-Artaud 1977, Grand prix Lucian Blaga 1991, Prix de l'Académie Mallarmé 2016.

- 1977: Didascalies, Saint-Laurent-du-Pont, Éditions Le Verbe et l’empreinte, 18 p. BnF 34641933g
- 1980: Au sommet de la nuit, Librairie Saint-Germain-des-Prés, series "Poètes contemporains", 115 p. ISBN 2-243-01435-1
- 1984: Déjà l’aube d'un été, Librairie Saint-Germain-des-Prés, series "Poètes contemporains", 109 p. ISBN 2-243-02324-5
- 1985: Arthur Rimbaud & l’éveil des limbes, Troyes, Éditions Librairie Bleue, 95 p. ISBN 2-86352-033-4
- 1987: Arthur Rimbaud, Troyes, Éditions Librairie Bleue, 299 p. ISBN 2-86352-040-7
- 1989: Vies, Marseille, Éditions Sud, series "Poésie" , 99 p. ISBN 2-86446-084-X
- 1990: L’Œuvre inconnue de Rimbaud, Troyes, Éditions Librairie Bleue, 214 p. ISBN 2-86352-068-7
- 1994: Le mot qui manque, Amay, Belgium, Les éditions l’Arbre à Paroles, 72 p. BRB n°722214
- 1995: Omphalos, Amay, Les éditions l’Arbre à Paroles, 68 p. BRB n°808019
- 1995: La Révolte d’Arthur Rimbaud, Troyes, Éditions Librairie Bleue, series "Essais", 294 p. ISBN 2-86352-115-2
- 2003: Pierre du Seuil, Amay, Les éditions l’Arbre à Paroles, 103 p. BRB n°1420840
- 2006: KM 340, Saint-Pierre-la-Vieille, France, Atelier La Feugraie, series "L’Allure du chemin", 74 p. ISBN 2-905408-74-X
- 2007: L’Autre Rimbaud, Rimbach, Germany, Éditions En Forêt, 364 p. ISBN 978-3-929208-97-9
- 2010: Chemins vers la terre, Châtelineau, Belgium, Éditions Le Taillis Pré,
- 2012: La Gare de Voncq, Amay, Les éditions l’Arbre à Paroles, 68 p. ISBN 978-2-87406-532-3
- 2013: La Langue des signes, Paris, Éditions L’Herbe qui tremble, 75 p. ISBN 978-2-918220-16-9
- 2014: Un Printemps difficile, watercolors by Marie Alloy, Éditions L’Herbe qui tremble, 214 p. ISBN 978-2-918220-18-3
- 2014: Sous cet arbre et dans la rue, Laon, France, Éditions La Porte, series "Poésie en voyage", 18 p. BnF 439095887
- 2015: « Neige » followed by « Vivante étoile » on Éditions L’Herbe qui tremble 161 p.ISBN 978-2-918220-30-5

- Prix Mallarmé 2016
