= Annie Salager =

French poet (1934–2025)

External videos
- Annie Salager à la Cave littéraire à Villefontaine
- Annie Salager à la Cave littéraire à Villefontaine 2
- Annie Salager à la Cave littéraire à Villefontaine 3

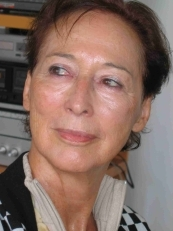
Portrait of Annie Salager

Annie Salager (1934 – 19 December 2025) was a French poet.

== Life and career ==
Salager was born in Paris in 1934. She published 15 books of poetry and many books in limited editions. Her first book won the 1963 Prix René Blieck. She won the 1999 Louise Labe Award, and the 2011 Prix Mallarmé.

She lived in Lyon, where she died on 19 December 2025, at the age of 91.

== Works ==
- La Nuit introuvable, Henneuse, 1963. Prix René Blieck
- Présent de sable, Chambelland, 1964
- Histoire pour le jour, Seghers, 1968
- La Femme buisson, SGDP, 1973, lithography Max Schöendorff. Prix J. Cocteau OCLC 2082038
- Les Fous de Bassan, SGDP, 1976, lithography Max Schöendorff, ISBN 978-2-243-00325-3
- Récit des terres à la mer, Federop, 1978, lithography Max Schöendorff
- Figures du temps sur une eau courante, Belfond, 1983, ISBN 978-2-7144-1624-7
- Chants, Comp'Act, 1988; 1994
- Le Poème de mes fils. éd. En forêt, bilingual French German, 1997
- Terra Nostra, Le Cherche Midi, 1999. Prix Louise Labé
- Les dieux manquent de tout, Aspect. 2004, ISBN 978-2-909096-49-0
- Rumeur du monde, L'act Mem, 2007, ISBN 978-2-35513-003-8
- Aimez-vous la mer le tango, Ed. En Forêt, 2009, ISBN 978-3-941042-14-8
- Travaux de lumière, La rumeur libre, 2010, ISBN 978-2-35577-017-3 - Prix Mallarmé 2011

=== Chapbooks ===
- Dix profils sur la toile, l’été, Illustrations Pierre Jacquemon. Henneuse
- Les lieux du jour. Pulsations. Mémoire déchirée. Vite au lit., 4 manuscripts, Ed. À Travers. Linocuts Jacques Clauzel
- Double figure de louange, Le Verbe et L'Empreinte, 1990, etchings Paul Hickin
- Calendrier solaire, Le Verbe et l'Empreinte, 1997, etchings Marc Pessin
- Des lieux où souffle l’espace Le Verbe et l’Empreinte, 2001, etchings Marc Pessin
- Poursuites, traces, Manière noire, 1996, etchings Paul Hickin
- Dits de manière noire, Manière noire, 1997, ouvrage collectif, etchings Michel Roncerel
- La Chasse à la gazelle, Manière noire, 1999, etchings Michel Roncerel
- Palmyre, Manière noire 2003, etchings Michel Roncerel
- Ombres portées, Tipaza, 2003, ouvrage collectif, photos J.Clauzel
- Glissements vers l’une, 2004, drawings Maxime Préaud
- Galta, coll. Le vent refuse, 2005, paintings Jacqueline Merville
- L'Embarcadère de bout du monde, Manière noire, 2006, etchings Michel Roncerel

=== Stories ===
- Marie de Montpellier Presses du Languedoc, 1991 ISBN 978-2-85998-091-7
- Le Pré des langues éditions du Laquet, 2001, interview ISBN 978-2-84523-039-2
- Un week-end chez l’autre, collected works, La passe du vent 2003
- Passants, collected works, Aedelsa 2004
- La muette et la prune d'ente, Urdla, Villeurbanne, 2008
- Bleu de terre, La passe du vent, 2008
