= André Schmitz =

Belgian poet (1929–2016)

- Born: 17 August 1929; Erneuville, Belgium
- Died: 15 January 2016 (aged 86); Turpange, Belgium
- Occupation: poet

André Schmitz (17 August 1929 – 15 January 2016) was a Belgian poet.

He stayed in Central Africa, Lebanon, Quebec, and India.

== Awards ==
In 1987, he won the A. and J. Goffin Prize Foundation for all of his culminated work, and 2000 he received the Mallarmé prize for Incises incisions.

He also received the French Community of Belgium quinquennial prize of literature for (culmination of work), and Tristan Tzara prize for scraping wings.

== Works ==
- For the Love of Fire, the Artists, 1961
- Double Voice and attached, editions of Aquarius, 1965
- Soleils rauques, Andre de Rache, Brussels 1973 (triennial prize for Literature, Brussels 1975)
- Oiseaux, éclairs et autres instants. Éditions Saint-Germain-des-Prés. 1977. ISBN 978-2-243-00408-3.
- Une poignée de jours. Éd. Saint-Germain-des-Prés. 1982. ISBN 978-2-243-01935-3.
- Les prodiges ordinaires. Lausanne: L'AGE D'HOMME. 1991. ISBN 978-2-8251-0168-1. (Tristan Tzara prize, Paris 1991)
- Scraping wing, The Tree lyrics (Amay), Phi (Luxembourg), The Writings of ironworks (Quebec), 1994
- Incises incisions. Editions Phi. 2000. ISBN 978-2-89046-580-0. (Academy Award Mallarme 2000)
- A little rain between the teeth, poems, Protis-L'Arbre to Words, 2000
- In the prose of days, Anthology 1961 - 2001, Introduction - Study Dobzynski Charles, La Renaissance du livre, 2001
