= Jeanine Baude =

French poet and writer (1946–2021)

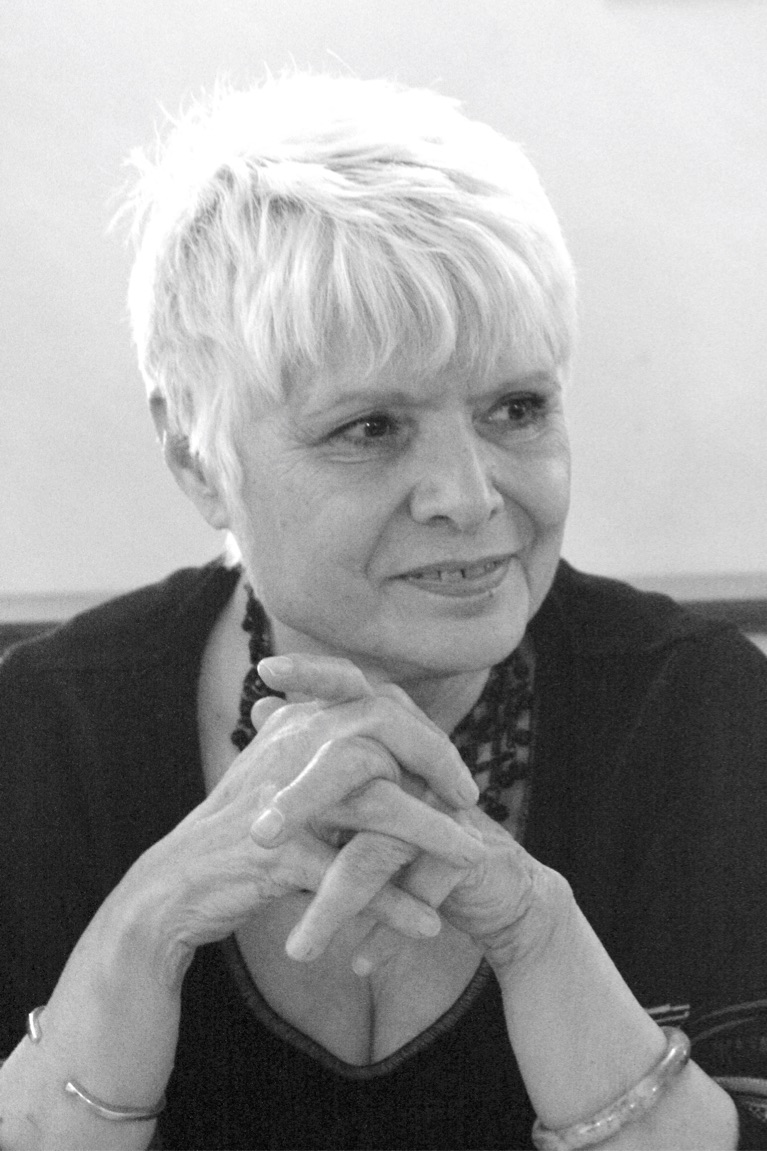
Baude in 2018

Jeanine Baude (18 October 1946 – 27 December 2021) was a French poet and writer, born in Eyguières.

Baude was awarded the Prix Antonin-Artaud in 1993. She died on 27 December 2021, at the age of 75.
