= May Menassa =

Lebanese journalist and novelist (1939–2019)

- مي منسى
- Born: 20 July 1939; Beirut
- Died: 19 January 2019 (aged 79-80)
- Occupations: Journalist, writer, editor-in-chief, critic and translator
- Notable work: Anta'il al-Ghubar wa Amsh
- Relatives: Sister: Vénus Khoury-Ghata and Leila. Son: Walid Menassa
- Awards: Shortlisted for the inaugural Arabic Booker Prize Lebanese order of merit

May Menassa (Arabic: مي منسى; 20 July 1939 – 19 January 2019) was a Lebanese journalist, writer, editor-in-chief, critic and translator, best known as the author of Walking in the Dust and I Killed My Mother in Order to Live. She was the first woman to enter the Lebanese television business and joined the only public television network at the time Télé Liban. She wrote a lot of articles and about ten novels.

== Early life ==
May Menassa was born 1939 in Beirut, Lebanon, in a Maronite Christian family. She was the younger sister of the Lebanese poet Vénus Khoury-Ghata and cousin of Latifé Moultaka and Zad Moultaka. Her father was strict but cultivated. He used to read books such as Les Misérables by Victor Hugo to his children before they go to sleep. She studied French Literature at university before pursuing a career in journalism. She became a novelist and a journalist. She only married once and had a son, Walid Menassa, before getting a divorce later on. May Menassa started her career in 1959 as a broadcaster, she was the first woman at the time to enter the Lebanese television business. She was the host of the talk show called "Women of Today" (nisa' alyawm / نساء اليوم) that aired on [Télé Liban].

She graduated with a degree in French Literature but ten years later, in 1969, she shifted to Arabic and she became part of the cultural team for the Lebanese paper An-Nahar, she worked as literature and music critic and was in charge of the cultural articles. She wrote multiple stories that were about music, theater and literature.

In 1986, she left An-Nahar to become the editor-in-chief of a women's magazine distributed in the Arab world called: Jamalouki.

In 1998 she published her first novel in Arabic: "Awraq min dafater chajarat rumman" (أوراق من دفاتر شجرة رمان، رواية، دار النهار) that talks about a past family tragedy: her brother's sickness. This same tragedy was brought up by Vénus Khoury-Ghata (at that time living in Paris, France) in French in the Novel: "Une maison au bord des larmes". They released their books at the same time, that evoke a similar tragedy.

=== During the Lebanese Civil War ===
She was 34 years old when the Lebanese Civil War started in 1975. During this war, she continued doing her job as a journalist, visiting regions where both parties were fighting. She used to observe how people were living there despite what was going on around.

Menassa never thought of giving up and migrating, yet she always fought for the right word to be said. Her vision was that people in her country, Lebanon, should put their hands together, disregarding who their leader is, to build a new improved country.

== Career ==
Menassa started her career as a TV presenter at Télé Liban. She was one of the first cast at this TV channel, since she applied when they were first opening the channel, although she didn't know very much about television and or about the requirements of the job. Her father was against this job at first because he thought that it was like an acting job. This pushed her father to go with her while applying for the oral and written exam where she was competing against 120 people, but she passed both superiorly. She worked for 8 years there as a TV host. However, she used to get disturbed by the limitations put upon her due to the nature of this job, such as time limitations. And she always wanted to get into journalism, yet she didn't know how to get into that field.

One day she got a call from An-Nahar offering her a job to be responsible for the new section of entertainment they were planning on opening. This section discussed women related topics, which was the main subject concerned in Menassa's TV shows. She directly accepted the offer feeling it was a way for her to work freely using pen and paper for expressing her ideas.

== Writing ==
While writing articles at An-Nahar, Ghassan Tueni, one of her closest friends and owner of An-Nahar, advised her to write novels. Since then, she published 10 novels and simultaneously wrote kids' stories, such as her first book that was in French "Le jardin de Sarah". At first, her brother and mother were her main inspiration. Most of her writings find essence from painful and melancholic stories. But before being a writer, she was a reader. In an interview with journalist Nadia Nouaihed, she declared that her favorite writers and poets were Jean Racine, Arthur Rimbaud, Victor Hugo, Molière and many others in French literature. As for Arabic literature, she read books from Naguib Mahfouz, Khalil Gibran, Mikhail Naimy, Tawfiq Yusuf 'Awwad and other more modern writers.

During her time at An-Nahar, she used to write about her main concerns such as: human, Lebanon and nature, but she never wrote an article that was about politics.

=== Inspiration ===
She had said she always felt honored and privileged working with both poets, Unsi Al Hajj and Shawqi Abu Shakra, at An-Nahar. She also used to be inspired by them and their work.

Her favorite quote was"Do not hate something unfortunate to you, you never know it might be better for you".

=== Novels ===
- Almashhad Al'akhir (2003)
- 'antaeil Alghabar Wa'amshi (2006)
- Alssaeat Alramalia (2008)
- Makinat Alkhiyata (2012)
- Tamathil Masdaeatan (2017)
- Qatalat 'umi Li'ahya (2018)

=== Books ===
- Mahfuzat Eatifiat Liharb Fi Lubnan (1983)
- Bayatan La Lishay' (1993)
- 'awraq Min Dafatir Sijiyn (2001)
- Mahfuzat Eatifiat Liharb Fi Lubnan (2003)
- Hin Yashiq Alfajr Qamisah (2009)

== Cultural and social associations ==
May Menassa was a committee member of the Al-Bustan Festivals. She was also a member of the society for the protection of the environment as well as Auxilia and Sesobel. She also participated in more than ten conferences yearly, talking about journalism and culture and in particular the importance of women in both those occupations. Lebanese culture is the main subject she discussed when participating in foreign conventions.

== Awards and nominations ==
She was nominated for the International Prize for Arabic Fiction twice for her novels Walking in the Dust and I Killed My Mother in Order to Live respectively in 2008 and 2019. After her death in 2019, May Menassa received the Lebanese National Order of Merit.

== Death and Afterwards ==
May Menassa died at the age of 80, on 19 January 2019. After her death, she was buried next to her mother in North Lebanon, Bsharri. Writing was a big part of her life, her legacy includes the multiple books and articles that she wrote.
