= Hélène Dorion =

Canadian poet and writer

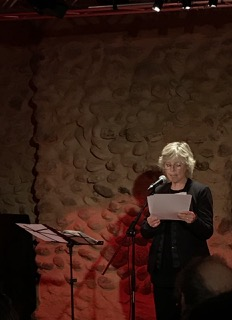
- Born: 21 April 1958 (age 68); Quebec City, Quebec, Canada
- Writing career
- Genre: Poetry
- Notable awards: Order of Canada; National Order of Quebec

Hélène Dorion, OC CQ (born 21 April 1958) is a Canadian poet, and writer.

== Life ==
Born in Quebec City, Quebec, Dorion taught literature before heading Publisher Noroît from 1991 until 2000. She also conducted a series of audio recordings of poetry and music, and was writer in residence at the UQÀM and the University of Montreal.

Dorion has published over twenty books of poetry, Without including board, not the end of the world (1995 ), The Walls of the Cave (1998), Portraits of the seas (2000), and delight: the places (2005). An anthology of her poems, prepared by Pierre Nepveu, entitled On the clay and breath, was published in pocket Éditions TYPO, and in 2006, Éditions de France published a retrospective of her poetry under the title Worlds fragile, frail things.

Dorion is the author of fifteen artists' books, and her works are included in many anthologies. Her work appeared in Estuary (Quebec), the Courier of the International poetic Studies (Belgium), Cronica (Romania) and omens (France), with criticism in various cultural and literary publications. She has developed numbers of foreign journals devoted to poetry as well as Quebec anthologies and an edition of poems by Saint-Denys Garneau.

In 2002, she published Days of sand, the story that won her the Prix Anne-Hébert, then in 2003, Under the arch of timea, a work which brings together essays on writing, literature, and the role of art in society. Her first book La Vie bercée (2006), was nominated for three awards, including the Prix du Livre Jeunesse Library Montreal and The White Raven (Italy) .

Translated and published in over fifteen countries, her work has earned her several honors and awards, including the Governor General of Canada, the Prix Alain-Grandbois, Aliénor Prize, the International Poetry Award-Walloon Brussels and the Prix du Festival International de Poésie de Romania. In 2005, Dorion was the first Quebecer to receive the Mallarmé prize.

In 2006, Dorion was received at the Académie des lettres du Québec and was named among the "Personalities of the Year" by the newspaperThe Gazette. In 2007, she was named Chevalier of the National Order of Quebec. In 2010, she was appointed an Officer of the Order of Canada.

== Awards ==
- 2007: Named Chevalier de l'Ordre national du Québec.
- 2007: Finalist-Alvine Bélisle Award for The cradled Life
- 2007: Finalist for the Prix du livre jeunesse des bibliothèques de Montréal for The cradled Life.
- 2007: Selection White Ravens 2007, International Youth Library for The cradled Life .
- 2006: Recipient of the Governor General of Canada for delight: places.
- 2006: Election to the Académie des lettres du Quebec.
- 2005: Recipient of the Prix Mallarmé [France] for all her work to mark the publication of delight: places.
- 2004: Winner of the Prix Anne-Hébert's novel Days of sand.
- 2003: Finalist for the Prix des Libraires, Class novel Québécois, for Days of sand
- 2003: Finalist Award spiral test for Days of sand.
- 1999: Recipient of the Prix Aliénor [France] for Stones invisible.
- 1998: Election to the Academy of Arts of Oradea in Romania.
- 1997: Winner of International Poetry Festival in Romania for The Issue, the resonance of the disorder.
- 1996: Winner of the Prix Alain-Grandbois de l'Académie des Lettres du Quebec for Without board, world without end.
- 1995: Recipient of the Award of the Society of Canadian writers for The Issue, the resonance of the disorder.
- 1993: Won the Grand Prix de la Culture des Laurentides, Letters category.
- 1992: Recipient of the International Prize for Poetry awarded Wallonia-Brussels Marché de la Poésie de Paris for the whole of her work.

== Works ==
=== Poetry ===
- Le Hublot des heures, Paris, Éditions de La Différence, 2008, 112 p.
- Mondes fragiles, choses frêles, Montréal, Éditions de l'Hexagone, collection « Rétrospectives », 2006, 808 p.
- Ravir : les lieux, Paris, Éditions de La Différence, 2005, 2007, 117 p.
- D'argile et de souffle, an anthology prepared by Pierre Nepveu, Montréal, Éditions Typo, 2002, 304 p.
- Portraits de mers, Paris, Éditions de La Différence, 2000, 128 p.
- Fenêtres du temps, in collaboration with Marie-Claire Bancquart (Voilé/Dévoilé), Montréal, Éditions Trait d'Union, 2000, 110 p. Épuisé.
- Passerelles, poussières, Rimbach (Germany) Éditions Im Wald, 2000, 54 p.
- Les Murs de la grotte, Paris, Éditions de La Différence, 1998, 96 p.
- Pierres invisibles, encres de Julius Baltazar, Saint-Benoît-Du-Sault (France), Éditions Tarabuste, 1998, 60p. Saint-Hippolyte, Éditions du Noroît, 1999, 60 p. (Sold out)
- Sans bord, sans bout du monde, Paris, Éditions de La Différence, 1995, 2003, 120 p.
- L'Issue, la résonance du désordre, Amay (Belgium) L'Arbre à Paroles, 1993, 60p. Saint-Hippolyte, Éditions du Noroît, 1994, 60 p. Réédition, L'Issue, la résonance du désordre suivi de L'Empreinte du bleu, gravures de Marc Garneau, Saint-Hippolyte, Éditions du Noroît, 1999, 104 p.
- Les États du relief, Saint-Hippolyte et Chaillé-sous-les-Ormeaux (France), coédition Le Noroît / Le Dé Bleu, 1991, 1993, 88 p. (Épuisé)
- Le Vent, le désordre, l'oubli, drawings by Marc Garneau, Mont-sur-Marchienne (Belgium), Éditions L'Horizon Vertical, 1991. (Sold out)
- Un Visage appuyé contre le monde, drawings by Marc Garneau, Saint-Lambert et Chaillé-sous-les-Ormeaux, coédition Le Noroît / Le Dé Bleu, 1990, 1991, 1993, 1997, 112 p. (Reissue, Montréal, Éditions du Noroît, collection « Ovale », 2001.)
- La Vie, ses fragiles passages, cover illustration by Michel Fourcade, Chaillé-sous-les-Ormeaux, Éditions Le Dé Bleu, 1990, 112 p. (Épuisé)
- Les Corridors du temps, Trois-Rivières, Les Écrits des Forges, 1988, 1991, 117 p.
- Les Retouches de l'intime, Saint-Lambert, Éditions du Noroît, 1987, p. 99 Reissue, Montréal, Éditions du Noroît, 2004.
- Hors champ, Montréal, Éditions du Noroît, 1985, 109 p. (Sold out)
- L'Intervalle prolongé suivi de La Chute requise, drawings of the author, Montréal, Éditions du Noroît, series «L'instant d'après», 1983, 80 p.

==== English translations ====
- The edges of light: selected poems, 1983-1990. Translated by Andrea Moorhead. Guernica Editions. 1995. ISBN 978-0-920717-95-0.
- No End to the World: Selected Poems. Translated by Daniel Sloate. Guernica Editions. 2004. ISBN 978-1-55071-184-4.

=== Editor ===
- Hélène Dorion, ed. (1993). Le Souffle du poème : anthologie de poètes du Noroît. Editions Pierre Tisseyre. ISBN 978-2-89051-529-1.

=== Novels ===
- Jours de sable, Montréal, Éditions Leméac, 2002, 2004, 138p. Paris, Éditions de La Différence, 2003, 111 p.

=== Essays ===
- Sous l'arche du temps, Montréal, Éditions Leméac, 2003, 96p. Paris, Éditions de La Différence, 2005, 96 p. [expanded edition].

=== Youth memoir ===
- The cradled Life, (La Vie bercée) illustrations by Janice Nadeau, Montreal, Les 400 Coups, 2006, p. 48

== Bibliography ==
- Michael Brophy, "A Window Upon the World: The Poetry of Héléne Dorion," Forum for Modern Language Studies, 47,4 (2011), 468-479.
