= Yves de Bayser =

French poet, essayist, and translator

- Born: 1920
- Died: 1999 (aged 78–79)
- Occupations: Poet; essayist; translator

Yves de Bayser (1920–1999) was a French poet, essayist, and translator.

== Life ==
He was discovered by René Char and contributed to 1946 journals: Fontaine, L’Arche, Botteghe oscure, and Mercure de France. In 1954, Albert Camus published his essays, Églogues du tyran, in his Gallimard collection.

== Awards ==
- 1975 Société des gens de lettres Grand Prix de la poésie
- 1980 Mallarmé prize

== Works ==
- Douze poèmes pour un secret, Guy Lévis-Mano 1948.
- Également auteur du Jardin (Tchou, 1970), préfacé par André Pieyre de Mandiargues
- Inscrire (Granit, 1979) ISBN 2-86281-107-6
- Le jardin, Granit, 1993 LCCN 71574986
- Apercevoir, Fata Morgana, 1999. ISBN 978-2-85194-488-7

=== Translations ===
- Le cycle de Cuchulain William Butler Yeats, Translated by Yves de Bayser, Obliques, 1974
- "Le Seuile du Palais du Roi", Cahiers de l'Herne, Yeats,

=== English translations ===
- Adam international review, Volumes 42–43, 1980
