= Jean Vodaine =

Franco-Slovenian writer and artist

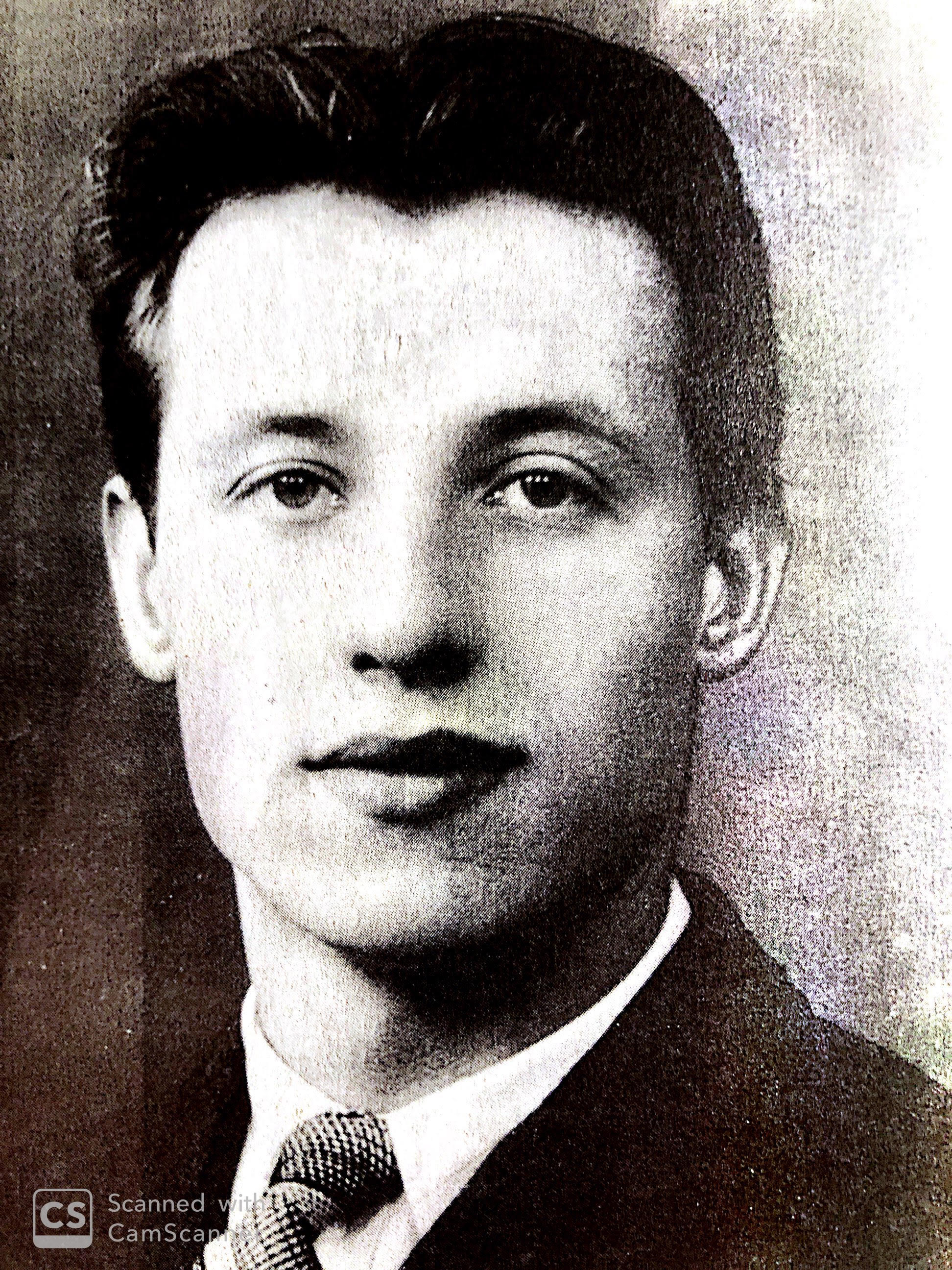
- Young Jean Vodaine
- Born: Vladimir Kavčič; 6 July 1921; Volče, Slovenia
- Died: 8 August 2006 (aged 85); Pont-à-Mousson, France
- Known for: painting, typography, poetry
- Notable work: Paintings, Poetry, Design, Typography

Jean Vodaine (6 July 1921—8 August 2006), born Vladimir Kavčič, was a Franco-Slovenian poet, writer, typographer and painter who won many international awards. He was born on 6 July 1921 in Volče, Slovenia. From the second half of the 19th century, Slovene lands experienced quite intense emigration. Some of the Slovene emigrants ended up in France, most of them in Lorraine, where they preserved their cultural life through societies. Writers were also among the emigrants, most significantly Vodaine. In a Lorrainian village, he founded the international literary magazine Dire, which was famous for its luxurious typographical design. Vodaine was also a painter and a poet, as well as a prominent translator of Slovene poetry. Along with the painter Veno Pilon, he compiled a short anthology of translated Slovene poetry, but they did not manage to realize their idea of a comprehensive anthology. Vodaine's poetic oeuvre consists of more than ten poetry collections that are stylistically fairly diverse, and he would often sing Lorraine's praises.
