= Jean Joubert =

French novelist (1928–2015)

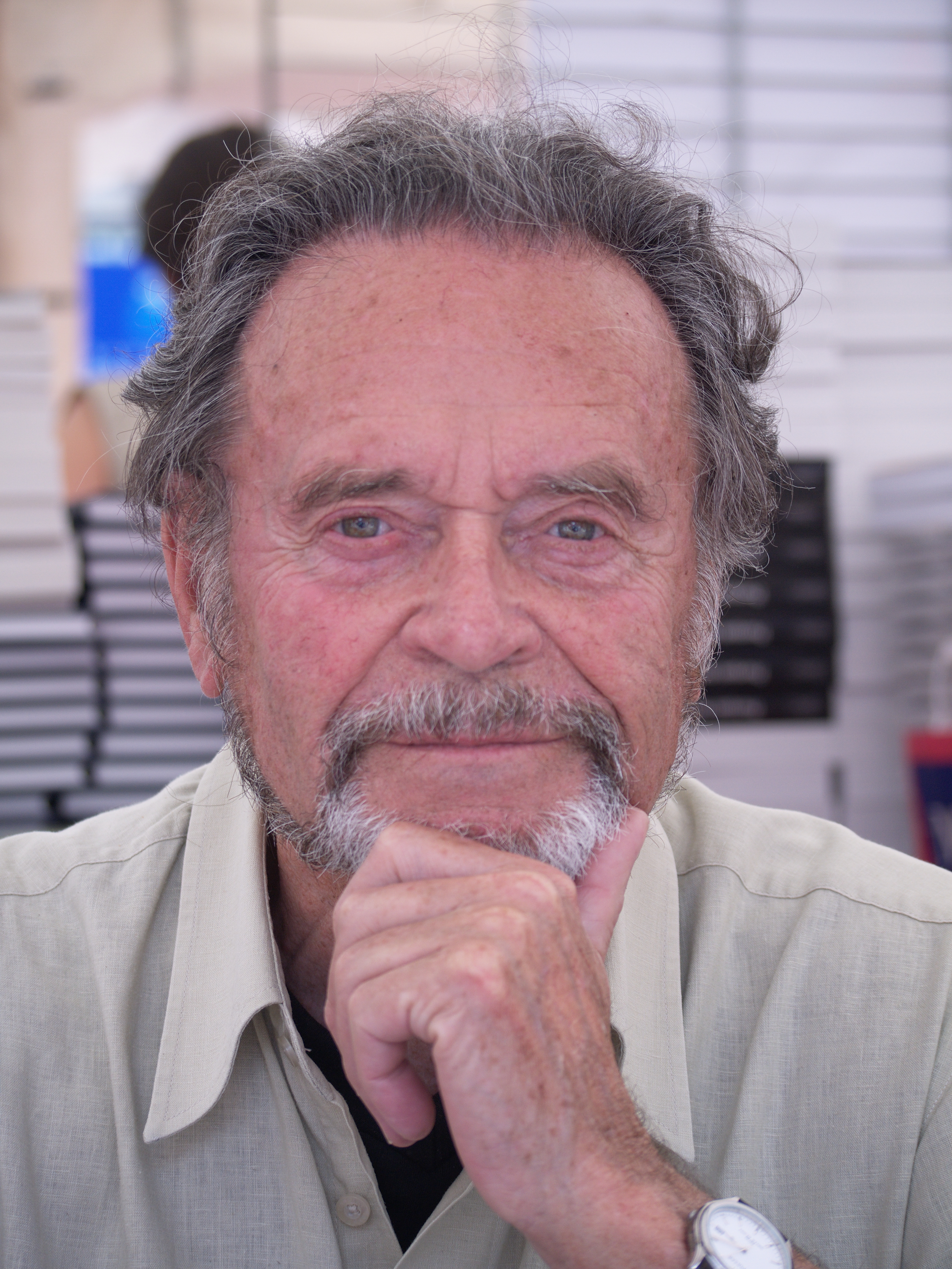
- Joubert in 2010
- Born: 27 February 1928; Châlette-sur-Loing, France
- Died: 28 November 2015 (aged 87); Montpellier, France
- Occupation: Novelist
- Writing career
- Language: French; English
- Genres: Short story; poetry

Jean Joubert (27 February 1928 – 28 November 2015) was a French novelist, short story writer, and poet.

He won the 1978 Prix Mallarmé for Poems: 1955–1975. He won the 1975 Prix Renaudot for L'Homme de sable.

== Life ==
Joubert was born in Châlette-sur-Loing, Loiret. He taught American literature at the Université Paul Valéry. He died on 28 November 2015, aged 87.

== Works ==
=== Works in English ===
- Denise Levertov (1984). Oblique prayers: new poems with 14 translations from Jean Joubert. New Directions Publishing. ISBN 978-0-8112-0909-0. "Jean Joubert."
- Black iris: poems, Translator Denise Levertov, Copper Canyon Press, 1988
- White owl and blue mouse, Translator Denise Levertov, Illustrator Michel Gay, Zoland Books, 1990, ISBN 978-0-944072-13-4

=== Works in French ===
==== Novels ====
- La Forêt blanche (White Forest), Grasset, 1969
- Un bon sauvage (A Good Savage), Grasset, 1972
- L'Homme de sable (Sandman), Grasset, 1975, Prix Renaudot. (adolescents - niveau lycée)
- Les Sabots rouges (Red Hooves), Grasset, 1979 et Éditions de l'Ecluse, 2007
- Mademoiselle Blanche (Miss White), Grasset 1990, et Domens poche 2008.
- Une Embellie, Actes Sud (An Embellishment, Acts South), 1996, (Prix Méditerranée des Lycéens, 1996)
- Les enfants de Noé (Noah's Children), 1988
- Un peu avant la nuit (A Little Before Dark), Actes Sud, 2001

==== Poetry ====
- Les Lignes de la Main (Lines of the Hand), Seghers (Prix Artaud 1956)
- Les Poèmes - 1955-1975 (Poems - 1955-1975), Grasset, 1977 (Prix de l'Académie Mallarmé)
- Les Vingt-Cinq Heures du jour (Twenty-five Hours of the Day), Grasset, 1987
- La Main de feu, Grasset (The Hand of Fire), 1993, (adolescents)
- Anthologie personnelle (Personal Anthology), Actes Sud, 1997, (adolescents)
- Arche de la parole (Ark (?) of the World), Le Cherche-Midi, 2001
- État d'urgence : Poèmes (State of Emergency: Poems) 1996-2008, Editinter, 2008

==== Short stories ====
- Le Sphinx et autres récits (The Sphinx and Other Stories), Le Cherche-Midi, 1978
- L'Assistant français (The French Assistant), Entailles, Phulippe Nadal éditeur, 1988
- Claire dans le miroir et autres nouvelles (Claire in the Mirror and Other News), Mélis Éditions, 2004

==== Children's novels ====
- Hibou blanc et souris bleue (White Owl and Blue Mouse), l'École des loisirs, 1978
- Mystère à Papendroch (Mystery in Papendroch), l'École des loisirs, 1982
- Histoires de la forêt profonde (Deep Forest Stories), l'École des loisirs, 1984
- Les Enfants de Noé (Noah's Children), l'École des loisirs, 1987
- Le Pays hors du monde (The Country Outside the World), l'École des loisirs, 1991
- À la recherche du rat-trompette (In Search of the Trumpet Rat), l'École des loisirs, 1993
- Bongrochagri, Éditions Grandir, 1994
- La Pie Magda (Pius Magda), belle brigande, l'École des loisirs, 1995
- Le Chien qui savait lire (The Dog Who Could Read), l'École des loisirs, 1996
- L'Été américain (American Summer), l'École des loisirs, 1998, (Médium poche)
- Mademoiselle Nuit (Miss Night), l'École des loisirs, 2000, (Médium poche)
- Blouson bleu (Blue Jacket), Autres Temps jeunesse, 2001
- Le Roi Jean et son chien (King John and his Dog), Grandir, 2001
- La jeune femme à la rose (The Young Lady With the Rose), l'École des loisirs, 2002
- Voyage à Poudrenville (Trip to Poudrenville), Éd. des Livres, 2003
- Adrien dragon (Dragon Adrian), Éditions Grandir, 2003
- Jean, il y a des souris dans la cuisine (Jean, there are Mice in the Kitchen), l'École des loisirs, 2005
- Mini-contes pour enfants pointus (Mini Tales for Sharp Children), Pluie d'Étoiles, 2007

==== Children's poetry ====
- Poèmes de la lune et de quelques étoiles (Poems of the Moon and Some Stars), l'École des loisirs, 1992
- L'Amitié des bêtes (The Friendship of Animals), l'École des loisirs, 1997
- La Maison du poète (The Poet's House), Éditions Pluie d'Étoiles, 1999
- Petite musique du jour (Little Music of the Day), Pluies d'Étoiles, 2004
- Chemin de neige Lo Païs d'enfance (Lo Pais Snow Trail), Éditions du Rocher, 2006
- Arbre, mon ami (Tree, my friend) (story-poem) Album, Éditions Grandir, 2009
