= Odile Duboc =

French choreographer (1941–2010)

Odile Duboc (23 July 1941 in Versailles – 23 April 2010 in Paris) was a French dancer, choreographer and teacher of contemporary dance. From 1990 until 2008, she was the director of the National Choreographic Center of Franche-Comté in Belfort where she succeeded Joanne Leighton.

She died on 23 April 2010 at the age of 69, as a result of cancer.

== Works ==
- Les Mots de la matière, DVD book, "Les Solitaires Intempestifs" publishing house, Besançon, 2012, ISBN 978-2-84681-369-3.
