= Henk Breuker =

Hendrikus Frederikus "Henk" Breuker (1914 – 2003) was a Dutch master turner in the pottery of Pieter Groeneveldt. After training as a cabinetmaker, he studied drawing in Leiden. First, he worked briefly as an apprentice potter in the Zaalberg factory. He then joining Groeneveldt. Here he worked until the bankruptcy in 1973. He signed his work with the monogram "HB" next to the monogram "PG" from Groeneveldt. After 1973 Breuker has worked as a potter in his own studio.

== See also ==
- List of Dutch ceramists
