= Pierre Oster =

French poet and editor (1933–2020)

- Born: 6 March 1933; Nogent-sur-Marne, France
- Died: 22 October 2020 (aged 87); Paris, France
- Occupations: Poet; Editor

Pierre Oster (6 March 1933 – 22 October 2020) was a French poet and editor born into a Luxembourgish family. After his marriage to Angella Soussoueva in 1971, he often credited his wife in addition to himself on his works.

== Biography ==
Oster studied at the Collège Sainte-Croix de Neuilly, the Lycée Buffon, the Lycée Louis-le-Grand, and Sciences Po. His first poem, Premier poème, was published by Mercure de France in 1954 thanks to support from Pierre Jean Jouve. Quatre Quatrains gnomiques was published in La Nouvelle Revure française thanks to Marcel Arland and Jean Paulhan. His first collective work, Le Champ de Mai, was published in 1955 and won him the Prix Fénéon. In 1958, he was awarded the Prix Max-Jacob for Solitude de la lumière. He then departed to serve in the Algerian War, returning to France in 1959.

In 1961, Jean Paulhan helped set up a meeting between Oster and Saint-John Perse, who gave him great poetic motivation. He worked with Claude Tchou, who helped Oster cover Pascal Pia and the Bibliothèque nationale de France. Alongside Tchou and Jean-Claude Zylberstein, he published the first complete collection of Paulhan's works. In 1992, he was awarded the Grand prix de poésie de la SGDL. He contributed to the Babel collection, published by Actes Sud, while living in Mazamet. In June 2019, Oster was awarded the Grand Prix de Poésie of the Académie française.

Pierre Oster died in Paris on 22 October 2020 at the age of 87.

== Publications ==
- Le Champ de mai (1955)
- Solitude de la lumière (1957)
- Un nom toujours nouveau (1960)
- La Grande Année (1964)
- Les Dieux (1970)
- Chiffres en ballade (1972)
- Requêtes (1977)
- Pratique de l'éloge (1977)
- Cérémonial de la réalité (1981)
- Rochers. Trente et unième poème (1982)
- Le Murmure (1982)
- Art poétique (1983)
- Vingt-neuvième poème (1985)
- Art poétique (1987)
- Les Vigneaux. Honneur à Dorothée Léger (1987)
- Dictionnaire de citations françaises (1987)
- L'Hiver s'amenuise (1990)
- L'Ordre du mouvement (1991)
- Requêtes (1992)
- Une Machine à indiquer l'univers (1992)
- Saint-John Perse (1992)
- Alchimie de la lenteur (1997)
- Le Savoir de la terre (1998)
- Membres épars des dieux (1999)
- Paysage du Tout 1951-2000 (2000)
- "Je la craignais" (2007)
- Pratique de l'éloge (2009)
- Vignettes russes (2010)
- Utinam varietur (2012)
- Les morts (2014)
