= Werner Lambersy =

Belgian poet (1941–2021)

- Born: 16 November 1941; Antwerp, Military Administration in Belgium and Northern France
- Died: 18 October 2021 (aged 79); Paris, France
- Occupation: Poet

Werner Lambersy (16 November 1941 – 18 October 2021) was a Belgian poet.

== Biography ==
Lambersy was born in Antwerp to a Jewish mother and Flemish father. During World War II, his father was involved with the Schutzstaffel and went to prison after the war. Therefore, Lambersy grew up without a father figure in his life. This family background influenced much of his poetic work.

Throughout his career, Lambersy wrote nearly seventy books and was considered a major player in French literature. He served as literary attaché for Belgian literature at the Centre Wallonie-Bruxelles de Paris until 2002. He received numerous awards, including the Prix Mallarmé, the Prix Théophile-Gautier, the Prix Maïse-Ploquin-Caunan, and the Prix international de poésie francophone Yvan-Goll.

Lambersy died in Paris on 18 October 2021 at the age of 79.

== Works ==
- Caerulea (1967)
- À cogne-mots (1968)
- Haute Tension (1969)
- Temps festif (1970)
- Silenciaire (1971)
- Moments dièses (1972)
- Groupes de résonances (1973)
- Protocole d'une rencontre (1975)
- Maîtres et Maisons de thé (1979)
- Le Déplacement du fou (1982)
- Paysage avec homme nu dans la neige (1982)
- Géographies et Mobiliers (1985)
- Komboloï (1985)
- Noces noires (1987)
- L'Arche et la cloche (1988)
- Un goût de champignon après la pluie (1988)
- Architecture nuit (1992)
- L'écume de mer est souterraine (1993)
- Le Nom imprononçable du suave (1993)
- Anvers ou les anges pervers (1994)
- Front de taille (1995)
- Étés (1997)
- 12 poèmes ventriloques (1998)
- La Légende du poème (1998)
- Errénité (1999)
- Dites trente-trois, c'est un poème (2000)
- Ecce homo (jeu-parti) (2002)
- À feu ouverts (2004)
- Rubis sur l'ongle (2005)
- Le Roi Berdagot : farce en sept tableaux (2005)
- L'Invention du passé : 1971-1977 (2005)
- Coïmbra (2005)
- Achill Island note book (2006)
- Parfums d'apocalypse (2006)
- La Toilette du mort (2006)
- Corridors secrets (2007)
- Jacques Zabor (2008)
- Impromptu de la piscine des amirau (2008)
- Te spectem (2009)
- Quelque chose qui lui parlait tambours (2009)
- La Percée du jour (2009)
- Érosion du silence (2009)
- Devant la porte (2009)
- Pluies noires (2010)
- Conversation à l'intérieur d'un mur (2011)
- Un concert d'Archie Shepp (2011)
- À l'ombre du Bonsaï (2012)
- Quelques petites choses à murmurer à l'oreille des mourants (2012)
- Le Cahier romain (2012)
- Pina Bausch (2013)
- Opsimath : la nuit (2013)
- L'Assèchement du Zuiderzee (2013)
- Le Mangeur de nèfles : haïkus libres (2014)
- Déluges et autres péripéties (2014)
- Dernières nouvelles d'Ulysse (2015)
- Escaut ! Salut: suite zwanzique et folkloresque (2015)
- In angulo cum libro (2015)
- Dernières nouvelles d'Ulysse : avis de recherche (2015)
- Un requiem allemand 1986 (2015)
- La Perte du temps (2015)
- La Dent tombée de montagne (2015)
- Anvers ou Les anges pervers (2015)
- Epitapheïon (2016)
- D'un bol comme image du monde (2016)
- Vie et mort du sentiment étrange d'être dieu (2017)
- Le Sous-marin de papier (2017)
- Lettres à un vieux poète (2017)
- Hommage à Calder (2017)
- La Chute de la grande roue (2017)
- Ball-trap (2017)
- Bureau des solitudes (2018)
- Maîtres et maisons de thé (2019)
- La Musique à bouche (2019)
- Le grand poème (2019)
- L'Agendada (2019)
- Brainxit (2019)
- Les Convoyeurs attendent, journal sauvage (2020)
- Le festin de vivre (2020)
