= Lionel Ray =

French poet and essayist

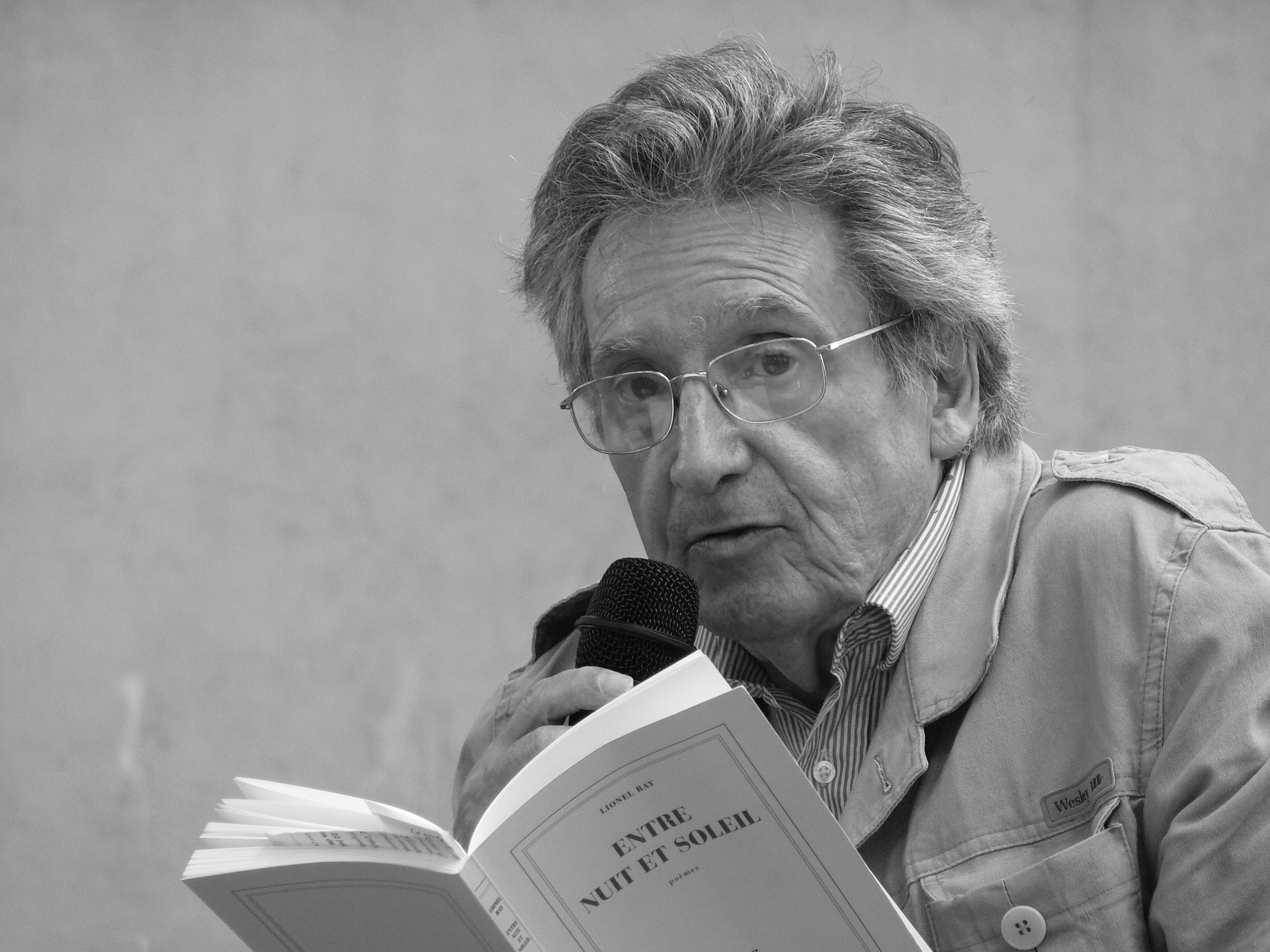
- Born: Robert Lorho; 19 January 1935 (age 91); Mantes-la-Ville, France
- Occupations: Poet; Essayist
- Writing career
- Genre: Poetry

Lionel Ray (born Robert Lorho; 19 January 1935, in Mantes-la-Ville) is a French poet and essayist.

== Biography ==
Born of a Breton father and a Walloon mother, he spent his childhood in the town of Mantes-la-Jolie. He published several collections under his real name, Robert Lorho, Associate of French language and literature professor at the Lycee Chaptal Khâgne. In 1970, he took the pseudonym of Lionel Ray. Lionel Ray is president of the Mallarmé Academy and a member of committees of the journal la revue Europe, and Aujourd'hui.

He teaches creative writing at the University of Paris-Sorbonne 4. He is a father of four children from his first two marriages: Anne, Frank, Adrien, and Philippe Lorho. He was married to Indian born French novelist Sumana Sinha. He lives in Paris.

== Awards ==
- 1965 Prix Guillaume Apollinaire
- 1981 Mallarmé prize
- 1995 Goncourt Prize for poetry
- 2001 Société des gens de lettres Grand Prize, for Pages d'ombre: poèmes.
- Kowalski Prize of the city of Lyon
- Guillevic Prize of the city of Saint-Malo

== Works ==
- Les Métamorphoses du biographe; suivi de la parole possible. – Gallimard, 1971, 131 p.
- Lettre ouverte à Aragon sur le bon usage de la réalité. – Paris : Les Éditeurs français réunis, 1971, 111 p.
- L’Interdit est mon opéra. – Gallimard, 1973, 116 p.
- Arthur Rimbaud. - Seghers (Poètes d’aujourd’hui), 1976, 183 p. Nouvelle édition 2001.
- Partout ici même. – Gallimard, 1978, 191 p.
- Aveuglant aveuglé. – Saint-Laurent-du-Pont : Le Verbe et l’empreinte, 1981, np.
- Le Corps obscur. – Gallimard, 1981, 112 p.
- Nuages, nuit : poèmes. – Gallimard, 1983, 123 p.
- Empreintes. - Saint-Laurent-du-Pont : Le Verbe et l’empreinte, 1984, [6 p.].
- L’Inaltérable. - Saint-Laurent-du-Pont : Le Verbe et l’empreinte, 1984, [3 p.].
- Voyelles et consonne. - Saint-Laurent-du-Pont : Le Verbe et l’empreinte, 1984, [12 p.].
- Approches du lieu; suivi de Lionel Ray et l'état chantant par Maurice Regnaut. – Moulins : Ipomée, 1986, 115 p.
- Le nom perdu : poèmes. – Gallimard, 1987, 127 p.
- Une sorte de ciel : poèmes. – Gallimard, 1990, 114 p. (Prix Artaud)
- Comme un château défait : poèmes. - Gallimard, 1993, 151 p. (Prix Supervielle 1994; Prix Goncourt de poésie 1995)
- Syllabes de sable : poèmes. - Gallimard, 1996, 170 p.
- Pages d'ombre: poèmes. Gallimard, 2000.
- Aragon : Seghers, "Poètes d'aujourd'hui", 2002 ISBN 978-2-232-12206-4
- Matière de nuit : poèmes. Gallimard, 2004.
- 12 poetas bengalis : recueil de poésie bengalie in French and Spanish, with Sumana Sinha. - Ed. Lancelot, 2006. Murcia.
- Tout est chemins: Anthologie de la poésie bengalie in French with Sumana Sinha. - éd. Le Temps des cerises, Paris. 2007.
- L'invention des bibliothèques (les poèmes de Laurent Barthélemy): Gallimard, 2007.
- Le Procès de la vieille dame. Eloge de la poésie. Collection of essays. Éditions de la Différence. 2008.

=== Collaborations with painters ===
- Le dessin est une mémoire : autour de l’œuvre graphique de Le Yaouanc. – Association culturelle de la Faculté des lettres et des langues de l’Université de Poitiers : Éditions de la Licorne, 1996, np [32 p.].
- Plusieurs ouvrages sur et avec le peintre cubain Joaquin Ferrer : Joaquin Ferrer ou l'Imaginaire absolu (monograph, éd. Palantines, Quimper, 2001, 130 illustrations).
- Sumana: recueil de neuf poèmes d'amour dedicated to his wife, accompanied by the painter Bardet C.J. and Bengal translation by Sumana Sinha.
- Comme nuage et vent, recueil de 6 poèmes accompanied by 4 etchings by Els Baekelandt (Éditions Sanchez-Alamo, graphisme analogique de la zone opaque, Paris, 2006)

== About Lionel Ray ==
- Jean-Paul Giraux, "Lionel Ray ou la modernité se moque de la modernité", Poésie/première no 21 février 2002
- Jean-Paul Giraux, "Lionel Ray et ce mythe appelé poésie", Poésie/première n°39, février 2008
- "Comme un château défait", Recueil N.30, Editions Champ Vallon, 1994 ISBN 978-2-87673-186-8
