= Prix Guillaume Apollinaire =

The prix Guillaume Apollinaire is a French poetry prize first awarded in 1941. It was named in honour of French writer Guillaume Apollinaire. It annually recognizes a collection of poems for its originality and modernity.

== Members of the jury ==
The members of jury of the Guillaume Apollinaire prize are elected for life. Since the last renewal (2011), the board members are:

- Charles Dobzynski (1929–2014) – president
- Jean-Pierre Siméon (1950–) – general secretary
- Marc Alyn (1937–)
- Marie-Claire Bancquart (1932–)
- Linda Maria Baros (1981–)
- Tahar Ben Jelloun (1944–)
- Zéno Bianu (1950–)
- Georges-Emmanuel Clancier (1914–)
- Philippe Delaveau (1950–)
- Guy Goffette (1947–)
- Bernard Mazo (1939–2012)
- Jean Portante (1950–)
- Robert Sabatier (1923–2012)

== Winners ==
The prize has been awarded 9 times to poets for all of their work: Paul Gilson, Pierre Seghers, Marcel Béalu, Vincent Monteiro, Luc Estang, Léopold Sédar Senghor, Jean-Claude Renard, Yves Martin, and Claude Roy.

It has been attributed 9 times to collections published by Éditions Seghers, 6 times by Flammarion and 6 times by Gallimard.

1940s

- 1941: Just Calveyrach for Guyane, Îles de Lérins
- 1942: Roger Rabiniaux for Les Faubourgs du ciel, Profils Litt. Fr.
- 1943: Yves Salgues for Le Chant de Nathanael, Profils Litt. Fr.
- 1944 to 1946 : pas de désignation
- 1947: Hervé Bazin for Jour, Iles de Lérins
- 1948: Jean L'Anselme for Le Tambour de ville, LEC, éd. Contemporaines, and Rouben Melik for Passeur d'horizon, Îles de Lérins
- 1949: no designation

1950s

- 1950: Paul Chaulot D'autres terres, Îles de Lérins
- 1951: Paul Gilson for all his work
- 1952: Alain Bosquet for Langue morte, Le Sagittaire
- 1953: Jean Malrieu for Préface à l'amour, Cahiers du Sud and Armand Lanoux for Colporteur, Seghers
- 1954: André de Richaud for Le Droit d'asile, Seghers
- 1956: Robert Sabatier for Les Fêtes solaires, Albin Michel
- 1957: Jacques Baron for Les Quatre temps, Seghers
- 1957: Gilbert Trolliet for La Colline, Seghers|
- 1958: Jean Rousselot for L'Agrégation du temps, Seghers
- 1959: Luc Bérimont for L'Herbe à tonnerre, Seghers, and Pierre Seghers for all his work

1960s

- 1960: Marcel Béalu and Vincent Monteiro for all their work
- 1961: Jean Breton for Chair et soleil, La Table Ronde
- 1962: Jeanne Kieffer for Cette Sauvage lumière, Gallimard
- 1963: Jean Bancal for Le Chemin des hommes, Silvaire
- 1964: Jean Desmeuzes for Ballade en Sol majeur, Millas-Martin
- 1965: Robert Lorho (pseudonym: Lionel Ray) for Légendaire, Seghers
- 1966: Catherine Tolstoï for Ce que savait la rose, Seghers
- 1967: Lorand Gaspar for Le Quatrième état de la matière, Flammarion
- 1968: Luc Estang for all his work
- 1969: Albert Fabre for La Lumière est nommée, Seghers

1970s

- 1970: Pierre Dalle Nogare for Corps imaginaire, Flammarion
- 1971: Gaston Bonheur for Chemin privé, Flammarion
- 1972: Serge Michenaud for Scorpion Orphée, éditions Guy Chambelland
- 1973: Marc Alyn for Infini au-delà, Flammarion
- 1974: Léopold Sédar Senghor for all his work
- 1975: Charles Le Quintrec for Jeunesse de dieu, Albin Michel
- 1976: Bernard Noël for Treize cases du je, Flammarion
- 1977: Édouard Maunick for Ensoleillé vif, Le Cherche midi
- 1978: Jean-Claude Renard for all his work
- 1979: Jean Laugier for Rituel pour une ode, éditions Caractères

1980s

- 1980: Vénus Khoury-Ghata for Les Ombres et leurs cris, Belfond
- 1981: Gaston Miron for L'Homme rapaillé, Maspéro
- 1982: Jean Orizet for Le Voyageur absent, Grasset
- 1983: Pierre Gabriel (poet) for La Seconde porte, Rougerie
- 1984: Pierrette Micheloud for Les Mots, la pierre, La Braconnière
- 1985: Jean-Vincent Verdonnet for Ce qui demeure, Rougerie
- 1986: Claude-Michel Cluny for Asymétries, La Différence
- 1987: Yves Broussard for Nourrir le feu, Sud-Poésie
- 1988: James Sacré for Une Fin d'après-midi à Marrakech, André Dimanche
- 1989: Philippe Delaveau for Eucharis, éditions Gallimard

1990s

- 1990: Jacques Gaucheron for Entre mon ombre et la lumière, éditions Messidor
- 1991: Yves Martin for all his work
- 1992: François de Cornière for Tout cela
- 1993: René Depestre for Anthologie personnelle, Actes Sud
- 1994: Jean-Pierre Siméon for Le Sentiment du monde, Cheyne
- 1995: Claude Roy for all his work
- 1996: Patrice Delbourg for L'Ampleur du désastre, Le Cherche midi
- 1997: Richard Rognet for Lutteur sans triomphe, L'Estocade
- 1998: Anise Koltz for Le Mur du son, Éditions phi, Luxembourg
- 1999: Claude Mourthé for Dit plus bas, Le Castor astral

2000s

- 2000: Alain Jouffroy for C'est aujourd'hui toujours, Gallimard
- 2001: Alain Lance for Temps criblé, Obsidiane/Le Temps qu'il fait
- 2002: Claude Adelen for Soleil en mémoire, Dumerchez
- 2003: François Montmaneix for Les Rôles invisibles, Le Cherche midi
- 2004: Jacques Darras for Vous n'avez pas le vertige, Gallimard/L'Arbalète
- 2005: Bernard Chambaz for Été, Flammarion
- 2006: Jean-Baptiste Para for La Faim des ombres, Obsidiane
- 2007: Linda Maria Baros for La Maison en lames de rasoir, Cheyne
- 2008: Alain Borer for Icare & I don't, Éditions du Seuil
- 2009: Jacques Ancet for L'Identité obscure, Lettres Vives

2010s

- 2010: Jean-Marie Barnaud for Fragments d'un corps incertain, Cheyne
- 2011: Jean-Claude Pirotte for Cette âme perdue, Le Castor astral and Autres Séjours, Le Temps qu'il fait
- 2012: Valérie Rouzeau for Vrouz, La Table ronde
- 2013: Frédéric Jacques Temple for Phares, balises & feux brefs, suivi de Périples, Bruno Doucey
- 2014: Askinia Mihaylova for Ciel à perdre, Gallimard
- 2015: Liliane Wouters for Derniers feux sur terre, Editions Le Taillis Pré, and for all her work
- 2016: Pierre Dhainaut for all his work, on the occasion of the publication of his collection Voix entre Voix, L'herbe qui tremble
- 2017: Serge Pey for Flamenco: les souliers de la Joselito, Les fondeurs de brique/Dernier Télégramme
- 2018: Cécile Coulon for Les Ronces, Le Castor astral
- 2019: Olivier Barbarant for Un grand instant, Champ Vallon

2020s

- 2020: Nimrod for Petit éloge de la lumière nature, Obsidiane
- 2021: André Velter for Séduire l’univers, précédé d'À contre-peur, Gallimard
- 2022: Denise Desautels for Disparaître, Éditions du Noroît / L'herbe qui tremble
- 2023: Patrick Laupin for La Mort provisoire
