= Linda Maria Baros =

Romanian writer

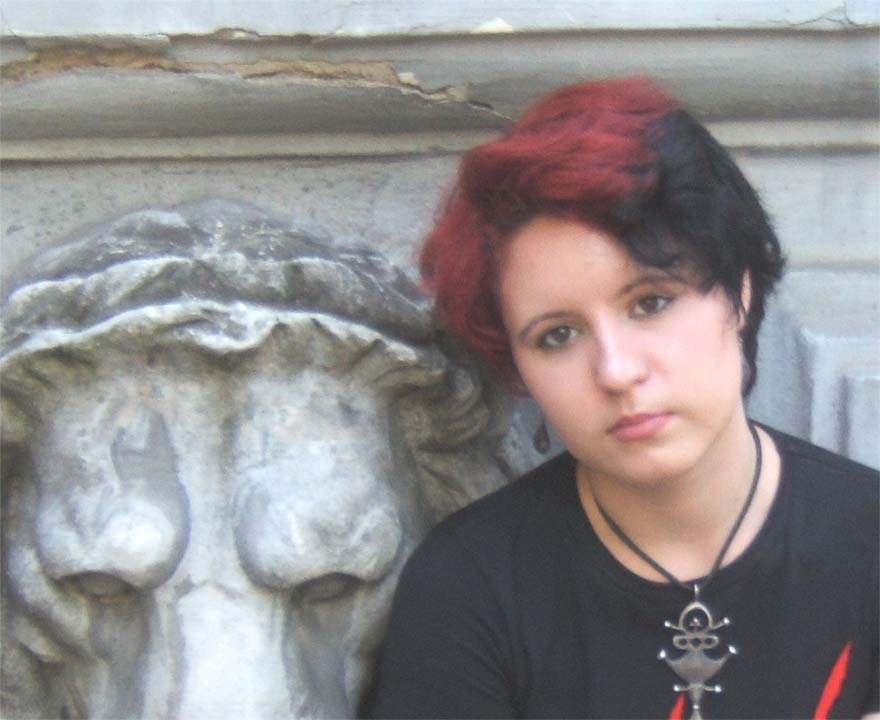
- Born: 6 August 1981; Bucharest, Romania
- Education: Paris-Sorbonne University
- Occupations: Poet, literary critic, translator
- Writing career
- Language: French
- Period: 2001–present
- Notable work: The House Made of Razor Blades
- Notable awards: Prix Guillaume Apollinaire (2007); Prix de la vocation en Poésie (2004)
- Website: lindamariabaros.fr

Linda Maria Baros (born 6 August 1981) is a French-language poet, translator and literary critic. She has won the Prix Guillaume Apollinaire in 2007 and The Poetical Calling Prize in 2004. She lives in Paris, France. She has been a member of the Académie Mallarmé since 2013. Her poems have been published in 25 countries.

== Education ==
Baros attended the Central School in Bucharest and the Victor Duruy High School in Paris. She earned a PhD in comparative literature from the Paris-Sorbonne University and University of Bucharest in 2011.

=== Publications ===
Baros has been a member of the Romanian Writers' Union since 2002. She was the founder and director of the literary review VERSUs/m (Bucharest) in 2005 and the assistant secretary for the Romanian Literature Translators' Association since 2006 and La Nouvelle Pléiade Association since 2009. Between 2009 and 2010 she was the poetry editor of the literary review Seine et Danube. She was associate editor of the scientific review "Cinematographic Art & Documentation", Hyperion University, from 2010 and editor-in-chief of the French-English literary review La Traductière since 2013.

=== Events ===
Baros initiated and co-organised the Le Printemps des Poètes/Primavara Poetilor (Spring of Poets festival) in Romania in 2005 , the Republic of Moldavia in 2006 and Australia in 2007. She was the cultural ambassador of Romania during the European Cultural Season in France in 2008. Between 2010 and 2012 Baros was a member of the jury of the Prix Max-Pol Fouchet (Max-Pol Fouchet Poetry Prize).

She was general secretary of the Collège de Littérature comparée (The College of Comparative Literature) from 2011 and a member of the Mallarmé Academy (Académie Mallarmé) since 2013.

- General secretary of Guillaume Apollinaire Prize since 2013

== Literary prizes ==
- 2001: Translation Prize Les Plumes de l'Axe, France
- 2001: The Poetry Prize of the Cultural Commission of the Paris-Sorbonne University, Paris IV, France
- 2002: Translation Prize of the International Academy Mihai Eminescu, Romania
- 2004: Prix de la Vocation (The Poetical Calling Prize) for Le Livre de signes et d'ombres, Cheyne éditeur, France
- 2007: Prix Guillaume Apollinaire (The Apollinaire Prize) for La Maison en lames de rasoir, Cheyne éditeur, France
- 2008: Ion Minulescu National Poetry Prize, Romania
- 2013: Top poetry prize Nichita Stănescu - Writers' Union of Moldavia

== Literary works ==
She made her debut in 1988 with a poem published in a literary review from Bucharest.

=== Poetry ===
- L'Autoroute A4 et autres poèmes (The Highway A4 and other poems), Cheyne éditeur, France, 2009, ISBN 978-2-84116-147-8
- La Maison en lames de rasoir (The House Made of Razor Blades), Cheyne éditeur, France, 2006, ISBN 978-2-84116-116-4, republished in 2008
- Le Livre de signes et d'ombres (The Book of Signs and Shadows), Cheyne éditeur, France, 2004. ISBN 978-2-84116-096-9
- Poemul cu cap de mistret (The Poem with a Wild Boar Head), Vinea Publishing House, Bucharest, 2003
- Amurgu-i departe, smulge-i rubanul! (The Sunset is Far Away, Rip off His Ribbon!), Bucharest, 2001.

=== Poems in translation ===
- De autosnelweg A4 en andere gedichten (The Highway A4 and other poems), translated by Jan H. Mysjkin, Poeziecentrum, Belgium, 2014 ISBN 978-905-655-445-3
- Bārdasnažu asmeņu nams (The House Made of Razor Blades), translated by Dagnija Dreika, Daugava, Riga, Latvia, 2011 ISBN 978-9984-41-053-1
- Къща от бръснарски ножчета (The House Made of Razor Blades), translated by Aksinia Mihailova, Foundation for the Bulgarian Literature Publishing House, Sofia, Bulgaria, 2010 ISBN 978-978-954-677-0
- Casa din lame de ras (The House Made of Razor Blades), Editura Cartea Româneasca, Bucharest, Roumanie, 2006 ISBN 973-23-1602-0
- Il est loin le soleil couchant, arrache-lui le ruban ! (The Sunset is Far Away, Rip off His Ribbon!), AMB, Bucharest, 2003 ISBN 973-86203-0-9

Baros' poems were published in over 25 countries, in anthologies and literary reviews, as, for example, Pleiades (United States of America) or Poetry Review, Horizon Review (England).

Her poems have also been published in Canada, Germany, Spain, Italy, Belgium, Switzerland, Netherlands, Luxembourg, Mexico, Serbia, North Macedonia, Slovenia, Bulgaria, Albania, Croatia, Ukraine, Republic of Moldavia, Latvia, Morocco, Bangladesh, Iran, Japan and Finland.

In 2011, the "Arthur Rimbaud" Museum in France commissioned Canadian sculptor Michel Goulet to engrave some of Linda Maria Baros' lines of poetry on an objet d'art made of stainless steel.

Baros took part in over 500 poetry readings and in over 50 poetry festivals.

=== Drama ===
- Marile spirite nu se ocupă niciodată de nimicuri (Great Spirits never Deal with Trifles), The Romanian Literature Museum Publishing House, Bucharest, 2003
- A venit la mine un centaur... (A Centaur Came to My Place...), META, Bucharest, 2003. This play was also published in French – Un centaure est venu chez moi..., Bucharest, 2002.

=== Literary studies ===
- Passer en carène (To Careen), The Romanian Literature Museum Publishing House, Bucharest, 2005
- Les Recrues de la damnation (The Recruits of Damnation), The Romanian Literature Museum Publishing House, Bucharest, 2005

=== Translations ===
Baros has translated over 30 books:

- Romanian to French poetry: Nichita Stănescu, Angela Marinescu, Marta Petreu, Ioan Es. Pop, Mircea Bârsila, Floarea Țuțuianu, Magda Cârneci, Simona Popescu
- French/English/Spanish/Dutch to Romanian: Henri Michaux, Boris Vian, Guy Goffette, Colette Nys-Mazure, José Luis Reina Palazón, Maria Antonia Ortega, Jan H. Mysjkin, Alphonse Daudet, Johanna Spyri, James Oliver Curwood
- In 2008, she created La Bibliothèque Zoom, a virtual library that includes 140 authors.

=== Anthologies ===
- Ordinul focului (The Order of Fire), Collette Nys-Mazure, AMB, Romania, 2005
- Les non-mots et autres poèmes (The Unwords and Other Poems), Nichita Stănescu, Éditions Textuel, France, 2005
- Anthologie de la poésie roumaine contemporaine (20 authors - Anthology of Contemporary Romanian Poetry) in Confluences poétiques, no. 3, France, 2009
- Sans issue / Fără iesire (No Exit), Ioan Es. Pop, Éditions L’Oreille du Loup, France, 2010
- Je mange mes vers / Îmi mănânc versurile (I Eat my Lines), Angela Marinescu, Éditions L’Oreille du Loup, France, 2011
- Je guéris avec ma langue (I Heal with My Tongue), Floarea Țuțuianu, Editions Caractères, France, 2013.
- L’Apocalypse selon Marta (The Apocalypse of Marta), Marta Petreu, Editions Caractères, France, 2013
- Anthologie de la poésie roumaine contemporaine. 1990-2013 (Anthology of Contemporary Romanian Poetry. 1990-2013, 13 authors), Tracus Arte, 2013).

=== Reviews ===
She has collaborated with the following poetry, literary criticism and translation reviews: The Poetry Review (UK), Horizon Review (UK), Pleiades (USA), International Notebook of Poetry (USA), Language & créativité (Canada), Contre-jour, Po&sie, Aujourd'hui poème, NUNC, Poésie 2003, Europe, Seine et Danube, La Revue littéraire, Pyro, Confluences poétiques, Ici & Là, MIR, La traductière, Hauteurs, Littérales, Le Capital des mots, Thauma, L’Écho d’Orphée, Le Bateau Fantôme, La page blanche, Levure Littéraire (France), Observator München, Galateea (Germany), Bunker Hill (Netherlands), Alora, la bien cercada, El Coloquio de los Perros, ABC (Spain), Poëziekrant, Deus ex machina, Le Journal des Poètes, Langue vive, Revolver (Belgium), Scritture Migranti, Formafluens (Italy), La Revue de Belles Lettres (Switzerland), Le Quotidien, Tageblatt, Le Jeudi (Luxembourg), Poetika, Zlatna greda, Književni list, Gradina (Serbia), Lirikon 21 (Slovenia), 'România literară', Viața Românească (Romania), Luceafărul (Romania), Adevărul literar si artitic, Ziua literară, Arges, Calende, Tribuna, Familia, Apostrof (Romania), Astra, Noua literatură, Conta, Arca (Romania), Électron libre (Morocco), Shirdanra (Bangladesh), Beagle (Japan)

== Schoolbooks ==
The poem The Mine Horses was included into Limba si literatura română. Manual de clasa a XII-a (Romanian language and literature. 12th-grade schoolbook), Paralela 45 Publishing House, 2007, Bucharest, Romania. ISBN 978-973-47-0141-4

== Anthologies ==
Baros' poems have been published in over 40 anthologies:

- L'année poétique 2005 (The Poetical Year 2005), by Patrice Delbourg and Jean Luc Maxence, Éditions Seghers, France, 2006
- Literatura tânără 2007 (Young Literature 2007), The Romanian Writers' Union, Romania, 2007
- VERSUs/m – Zoom 2007, Exigent Publishing House, Romania, 2007
- Poésies de langue française. 144 poètes d'aujourd'hui autour du monde (French-language poets. 144 Today Poets from all over the World), Éditions Seghers, France, 2008
- Poëzie van dichters uit de hele wereld. Poetry International 2008 – Anthology of the Poetry International Festival from Rotterdam, Netherlands, 2008
- Dicisiete poetas franceses. Antología de poesía francesa contemporánea (Seventeen Contemporary French Poets. Anthology of French Contemporary Poetry), edited by Lionel Ray, Lancelot, Spain, 2008
- Voix de la Méditerranée 2008 (Mediterranean Voices 2008), Éditions Clapas, France, 2008
- Ailleurs 2008. Une année en poésie, Musée Arthur Rimbaud, Charleville-Mézières, France, 2009
- "Entre estas aguas : poetas del mundo latino 2009" (Between These Waters: Poets of the Latin World 2009), Monterrey, Mexico, 2010
- Kijk, het heeft gewaaid, Poetry International, Rotterdam, Pays-Bas, 2009
- "Europski glasnik" (The European Messenger), Hrvatsko drustvo pisaca, Zagreb, Croatia, 2010
- Runoilevien naisten kaupunki (The City of Women Poets), Tammi, Helsinki, Finland, 2010
- Cheyne, 30 ans, 30 voix (Cheyne, 30 years, 30 voices ), Cheyne, France, 2010
- Poezia antiutopica (Anti-Utopian Poetry. An Anthology of Contemporary Romanian Poetry), edited by Daniel D. Marin, Paralela 45, Romania, 2010
- Couleurs femmes, Le Castor Astral & Le Nouvel Athanor, France, 2010
- Anthologie de la poésie amoureuse, edited by Marc Alyn, Écriture, France, 2010
- Zeitkunst. Internationale Literatur (International Literature), anthology, Verlagshaus J. Frank & Edition Polyphon, Germany, 2011
- Les Très riches heures du Livre pauvre ("The Very Rich Hours of the Poor Book"), album, Éditions Gallimard, France, 2011
- Anthologie de la poésie érotique féminine contemporaine de langue française ("Anthology of the Contemporary Female Erotic Poetry of French-language"), France, 2011
- The International Days and Nights of Literature, Uniunea Scriitorilor din România, 2011
- VERSschmuggel/réVERSible, CD, Wunderhorn & La passe du vent, Germany/France, 2012
- Resistenze bruciate. Da Angela Marinescu a Linda Maria Baros (Burned Resistors. From Angela Marinescu to Linda Maria Baros), anthology, Edizioni Akkuaria, Italy, 2012 - 11 poets
- Alchimie des ailleurs, album, Musée Arthur Rimbaud & Silvana Editoriale, France/Italy, 2012
- Pas d’ici, pas d’ailleurs (Not From Here, Not From Elsewhere), anthology, Éditions Voix d’encre, France, 2012
- Poeti romena al bivio : continuita e rottura (Romanian Poets at Crossroads: Continuity and Rupture), anthology, Scrisul românesc, Romania, 2012 - 25 poets
- Liberté de créer, liberté de crier (Freedom to create, freedom to shout), Editions Henry, Paris, France, 2014
- Cartea poeziei 2013 (Book of Poetry 2013), Editura Lumina, Republic of Moldavia, 2013
- L’alveare d’oro dell’invisibile, Contact international, Romania, 2013

== Translation scholarships ==
- "VERSschmuggel", Berlin (Germany), 2011
- Vertalershuis (Translators' House), Amsterdam (Netherlands), 2007
- Centre de Recontres Abbaye Neumünster (Luxembourg), 2006
- The 3rd Poetry Translation Workshop The Golden Boat (Slovenia), 2005
- Collège Européen des traducteurs littéraires de Seneffe (Belgium), 2003

== International festivals ==
- Cork Spring Poetry Festival, Cork, Ireland, 2014
- Acadie Rock, Moncton, New-Brunswick, Canada, 2013
- Festival acadien de poésie, Caraquet, New-Brunswick, Canada, 2013
- Voix de la Méditerranée, Lodève, France, 2013
- Biennale de la poésie / Poètes du monde, Saint-Quentin-en-Yvelines, France, 2013
- Primavara europeana a poeziei, Chisinau & Soroca, Republic of Moldavia, 2013
- Le Festival franco-anglais de poésie, France, 2013
- Printemps des Poètes, France, 2013
- Littératures Etrangères Festival, Audincourt, France, 2012
- Novi Sad International Festival, Serbia, 2012
- Voix de la Méditerranée, Lodève, France, 2012
- Zeitkunst Festival, Berlin, Germany, 2011
- International Festival Encuentro de Poetas del Mundo Latino, Mexico, 2011
- Poesiefestival, Berlin, Germany, 2011
- Voix de la Méditerranée, Lodève, France, 2011
- The International Days and Nights of Literature, Neptun, Romania, 2011
- Le Festival MidiMinuitPoésie, Nantes, France, 2010
- La Biennale Internationale de Poésie, Liège, Belgium, 2010
- Voix de la Méditerranée, Lodève, France, 2010
- Le Festival International de Poésie Wallonie-Bruxelles, Namur, Belgium, 2010
- Le Festival franco-anglais de poésie, France, 2010
- Printemps des Poètes, France, 2010
- À vous de lire, France, 2010
- DécOUVRIR, Concèze, France, 2010
- Biennale de la poésie, Saint-Quentin-en-Yvelines, France, 2009
- Paris en toutes lettres, France, 2009
- Le Festival International de la Poésie, Trois-Rivières, Canada, 2008
- Poetry International, Rotterdam, Pays-Bas, 2008
- European Voices, France, 2008
- Voix de la Méditerranée, Lodève, France, 2008
- Primavera dei Poeti, Italy, 2008
- Le Printemps Balkanique. Insolite Roumanie, France, 2008
- Le Mar de Letras, Cartagena, Spain, 2008
- World Poetry Day, Belgrade, Serbia, 2008
- Printemps de Poètes, Luxembourg, 2008
- Le Festival Dacia – Méditerranée, France, 2007
- Lectures sous l'Arbre, France, 2007, 2009
- Printemps de Poètes, France, 2007, 2008, 2009, 2010, 2012, 2013
- Festival International de Poésie Teranova, France, 2006
- Odyssey International Festival, Amman, Jordan, 2005
- La Biennale Internationale de Poésie, Liège, Belgium, 2005
- Le Festival International de Poésie, Rabat, Morocco, 2004
- Festivalul Internațional de Literatură, Neptun, Romania, 2001

== Bibliography ==
- Passages et ancrages en France. Dictionnaire des écrivains migrants de langue française (1981-2011) (Crossings and Anchors in France. The Dictionary of Migrant Writers of French-Language (1981-2011)), Ursula Mathis-Moser and Birgit Mertz-Baumgartner (ed.), Editions Honoré Champion, Paris, France, 2012 ISBN 9782745324009.
- Les obsessions poétiques de Linda Maria Baros (Linda Maria Baros' Poetic Obsessions), in Écrivains d'expression française de l'Europe du sud-est ("Writers of French-Language from South-Eastern Europe"), Editura Fundatiei România de Mâine, Romania, 2010, ISBN 9789731634456
- Un cas de révélation bien maîtrisée ("A Case of Well Controlled Revelation"), in L’Escabeau dans la bibliothèque (The Ladder in the Library), Paul Aretzu, Fundatia Culturala Ideea Europeana, Romania, 2007, ISBN 9789737691620
