= Bancquart =

Bancquart is a surname. Notable people with the surname include:

- Alain Bancquart (1934–2022), French classical composer
- Marie-Claire Bancquart (1932–2019), French poet, writer, and literary critic, wife of Alain
