= James Sacré =

French poet

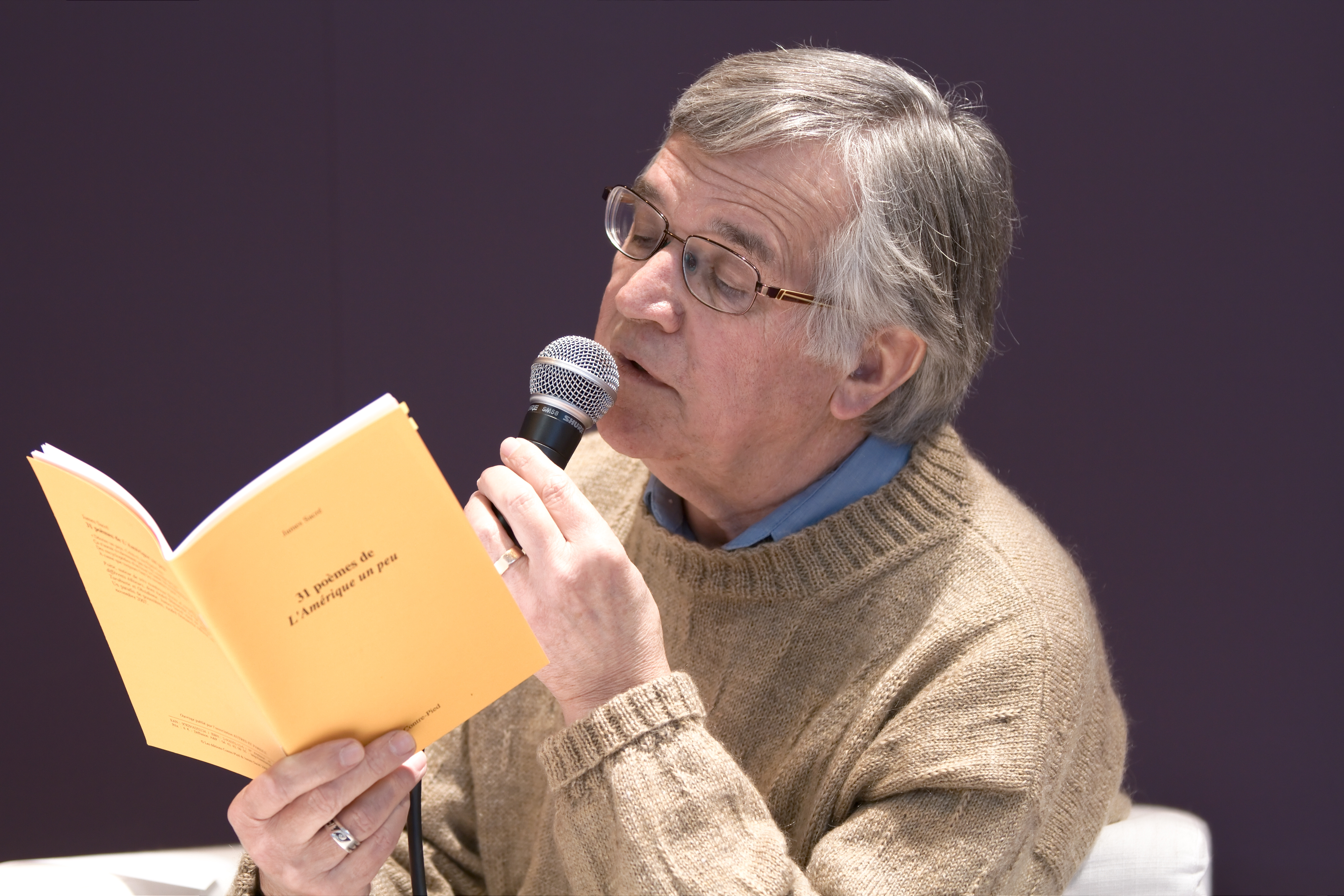
- James Sacré at the Paris Book Festival in March 2010.
- Born: May 17, 1939; Cougou, Saint-Hilaire-des-Loges (Vendée)
- Known for: Poetry
- Awards: Prix Broquette-Gonin, 1972; Obsidiane, 1983; Apollinaire, 1988; Antonio Viccaro, 1999; Max Jacob, 2010; Roger Kowalski, 2021; Théophile Gautier, 2021; Yves Cosson, 2022; Prix Goncourt de la poesie. Chevalier, Ordre des Arts et des Lettres; Doris Silbert Professor Emeritus in the Humanities at Smith College.

James Sacré is a French poet, born 17 May 1939 in Cougou, a village in Saint-Hilaire-des-Loges.

== Biography ==
James Sacré spent his childhood on his parent's farm in Vendée. After training in the college at Parthenay, he worked as a school teacher, and as an itinerant teacher. He left for the United States in 1965 to study literature, enrolling at Boston College. He taught French at Smith College in Massachusetts from 1972 until 2001. During that time, he made several journeys to France and the Mediterranean, visiting Italy, Tunisia and Morocco. In 2001, he returned to France, settling in Montpelier.

David Ball, a poet and translator of his work into English, wrote, "it is precisely true that the poetry of James Sacré turns and turns constantly. Not one major turn, but constant slight ones, often turning back to a previous image before expanding or completing it in yet another turn. In 1978 he published Slightly Moving Figures (Figures qui bougent un peu) and that, or “Figures Turning Slightly,” could serve as a title for any one of his books."

The Académie des Jeux Floraux has awarded Sacré their title of Maître ès jeux (Master of games), given to those who have won the Jeux floraux prize three times.

He was awarded the 2025 Prix Goncourt de la poésie in recognition of his body of work.

== Publications ==
- La femme et le violoncelle, J.C. Valin, 1966
- La transparence du pronom elle, Chambelland, 1970
- Cœur élégie rouge, Seuil, 1972
- Comme un poème encore, Atelier de l'agneau, 1975
- Paysage au fusil (cœur) une fontaine, Gallimard, 1976
- Un brabant double avec des voiles, Nane Stern, 1977
- Figures qui bougent un peu, Gallimard, 1978
- L'amour mine de rien, Encre/Recherches, 1980
- Quelque chose de mal raconté, with engraving by Olivier Debré, André Dimanche, 1981
- Des pronoms mal transparents, Le Dé bleu, 1982
- Rougigogne, Obsidiane, 1983
- Ancrits, Thierry Bouchard, 1983
- Écrire pour t’aimer, André Dimanche, 1984
- Bocaux, bonbonnes, carafes et bouteilles (comme), photographs by Bernard Abadie, Le Castor astral and Le Noroît, 1986
- La petite herbe des mots, Le Dé bleu, 1986
- La solitude au restaurant, Tarabuste, 1987
- Une fin d'après-midi à Marrakech, André Dimanche, 1988 - prix Guillaume-Apollinaire 1988
- Un oiseau dessiné, sans titre. Et des mots, Tarabuste, 1988
- André Valensi, éditions Musée des Beaux-Arts de Mulhouse, 1989
- Le taureau, la rose, un poème, illustrations by Denise Guilbert, Cadex, 1990
- Je ne prévois jamais ce que je fais quand je dessine, illustrations by Jillali Echarradi, Les petits classiques du grand pirate, 1990
- Comme en disant c'est rien, c'est rien, Tarabuste, 1991
- On regarde un âne, Tarabuste, 1992
- Écritures courtes, Le Dé bleu, 1992
- La poésie, comment dire?, André Dimanche, 1993
- Des animaux plus ou moins familiers?, André Dimanche, 1993
- Le renard est un mot qui ruse, Tarabuste, 1994
- Ma guenille, Obsidiane, 1995
- Viens, dit quelqu'un, André Dimanche, 1996
- Essais de courts poèmes, illustrations by François Mezzapelle, Cahiers de l’Atelier, 1996
- La nuit vient dans les Yeux, illustrations by Jillali Echarradi, Tarabuste, 1997
- La peinture du poème s’en va, Tarabuste, 1998
- Anacoluptères, illustrations de Pierre-Yves Gervais, Tarabuste, 1998
- Relation, essai de deuxième ancrit (1962-63 ; 1996), Océanes, 1999
- Labrego coma (cinco veces), photographies d’Emilio Arauxo, Noitarenga, 1999
- Si peu de terre, tout, Le Dé bleu, 2000
- L’Amérique un peu, Trait-d’union, 2000
- Écrire à côté, Tarabuste, 2000
- Une petite fille silencieuse, André Dimanche, 2001
- Monsieur l’évêque avec ou sans mitre, illustrations by Edwin Apps, Le Dé bleu, 2002
- Mouvementé de mots et de couleurs, photography by Lorand Gaspar, Le Temps qu'il fait (éditions), 2003
- Les mots longtemps, qu’est-ce que le poème attend ?, Tarabuste, 2004
- Sans doute qu'un titre est dans le poème, Wigwam éditions, 2004
- Trois anciens poèmes mis ensemble pour lui redire je t’aime, Cadex, 2006
- Broussailles de prose et de vers(où se trouve pris le mot paysage), Obsidiane, 2006
- Âneries pour mal braire, Tarabuste, 2006
- Un paradis de poussières, André Dimanche, 2007
- Le poème n’y a vu que des mots, L'Idée bleue, 2007
- Bernard Pagès : élancées de fêtes, mais tenant au socle du monde, La Pionnière/Pérégrines, 2009
- Portrait du père en travers du temps, lithographies couleur de Djamel Meskache, La Dragonne, 2009
- Paroles du corps à travers ton pays, poème de quatre pages accompagné de deux gravures sur bois de Jacky Essirard, Atelier de Villemorge, 2009
- Le désir échappe à mon poème, Al Manar, coll. « Méditerranées », 2009
- Tissus mis par terre et dans le vent, Le Castor astral, 2010
- America solitudes, André Dimanche, 2011
- Le paysage est sans légende, Al Manar / Alain Gorius, with illustrations by Guy Calamusa, 2012, awarded the Prix Max-Jacob
- Parler avec le poème, La Baconnière, 2013
- Ne sont-elles qu’images muettes et regards qu’on ne comprend pas ?, illustrations by Colette Deblé, Æncrages & Co, 2014
- Un désir d'arbres dans les mots, in collaboration avec Alexandre Hollan , Fario, 2015
- Figures de silences, Tarabuste, 2018, awarded the Théophile-Gautier prize by the Académie française, the Roger-Kowalski prize and Grand Poetry Prize of the city of Lyon, 2019
- Sans place et Je s'en va, with Antoine Emaz, Montpellier, Éditions Méridianes, 2019
- Quel tissu se déchire, Tarabuste, 2020
- Les arbres sont aussi du silence, Illustrations in Indian ink by Raphaël Segura, Voix d'encre, 2021
- Broussaille de bleus, illustrations by Jacquie Barral, Le Réalgar, coll. « L'Orpiment », 2021
- Figures de solitudes, Tarabuste, 2021
- Brouettes, dessins d'Yvon Vey, Obsidiane, 2022
- Une rencontre continuée, Le Castor Astral Poche poésie, 2022
- Un rectangle de toile peinte est là, with André-Pierre Arnal, Éditions du Bourdaric, 2022. Artist's book. 17 copies, all unique, signed by the author and the artist at the colophon.
- Une fin d’après-midi continuée, trois livres “marocains”, Tarabuste, 2023
