= Aksinia =

Aksinia (Bulgarian: Аксиния) is a feminine given name. Notable people with the name include:

- Aksinia Chenkova, Bulgarian musician
- Aksinia Mihaylova, Bulgarian translator, editor, and poet
