= Saint-Pol-Roux =

French poet (1861–1940)

Paul-Pierre Roux
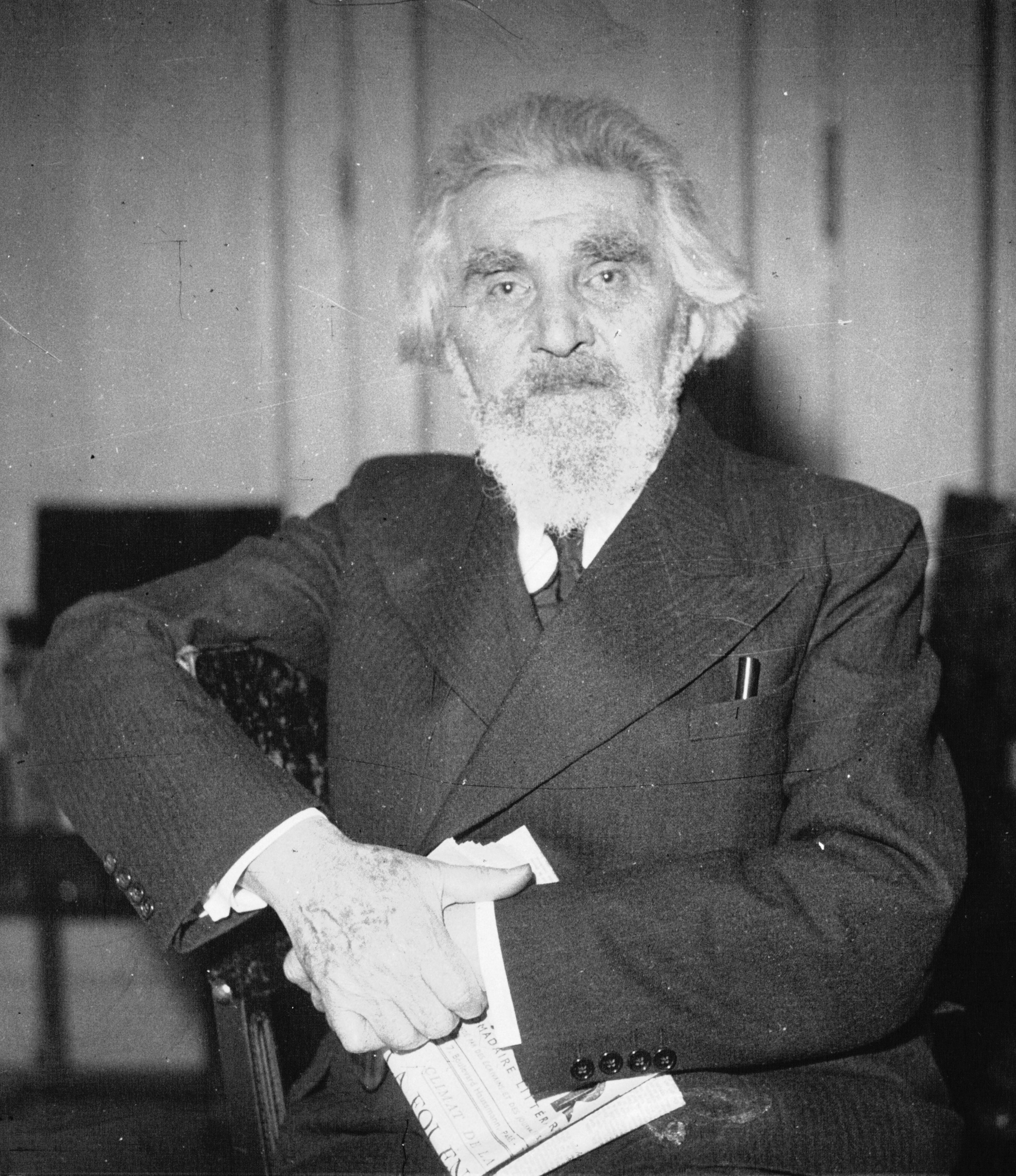
- Born: 15 January 1861; Marseille, France
- Died: 18 October 1940 (aged 79); Brest, France
- Occupations: Poet and writer
- Children: 4; three sons: Cœcilian, Lorédan, Magnus, one daughter: Divine
- Writing career
- Pen name: Saint-Pol-Roux
- Period: 20th century
- Genres: Poetry, opera, drama
- Movement: Symbolism

Paul-Pierre Roux, called Saint-Pol-Roux (15 January 1861, quartier de Saint-Henry, Marseille – 18 October 1940, Brest), was a French Symbolist poet.

== Life ==
=== Marseille ===
Saint-Pol-Roux was born to a middle-class family in Marseille, where his father was an industrialist. He studied in a lycée in Lyon, and left it as Bachelor of Arts in 1880. He then wrote some plays under his own name.

=== Years in Paris ===
He left the south of France to install himself in Paris. He particularly frequented the salon of Stéphane Mallarmé, for whom Saint-Pol-Roux had the greatest admiration. He won a certain notoriety, trying out several pseudonyms before finally becoming "Saint-Pol-Roux le magnifique". One of his plays, La Dame à la faulx, was put on by Sarah Bernhardt, and was interviewed by Jules Huret as a member of the Symbolist movement. He perhaps participated in the Rosicrucian aesthetic of Péladan. Nevertheless, he wrote nothing on the movement or on its founder although Saint-Pol-Roux seems to have been interested in this audacious literary experiment.

=== Voluntary exile ===
Saint-Pol-Roux left Paris in 1898, having come to hate it for his being ostracized, and for the mediocrity of the literary criticism circles, ignoring it with as much pride as he himself had been ignored. On a clairvoyant's advice, and also to escape his creditors, he left for the Ardennes. There he settled with his wife in Roscanvel, in Finistère, where their daughter Divine was born. After his father's death, he moved to Camaret and made Brittany the center for his work.

Living off the revenue he earned from his libretto for the opera Louise, he bought a house overlooking the ocean, above the Pen-Had beach, on the road to pointe de Pen-Hir. He transformed it into a manor in the Baroque style. He named it the ”Manoir de Coecilian”, after his son's name, or sometimes ”Manoir des Boultous”. He wrote "Facing the sea, man is closer to God" ("Face à la mer, l'homme est plus près de Dieu"). He welcomed several artists and writers at the manor, notably Louis-Ferdinand Céline, who looked up to him as an ancestor, and even Jean Moulin, then ”sous-préfet de Châteaulin”, who visited in 1930.

Saint-Pol-Roux was a member of the académie Mallarmé from 1937 to 1940.

=== Death ===
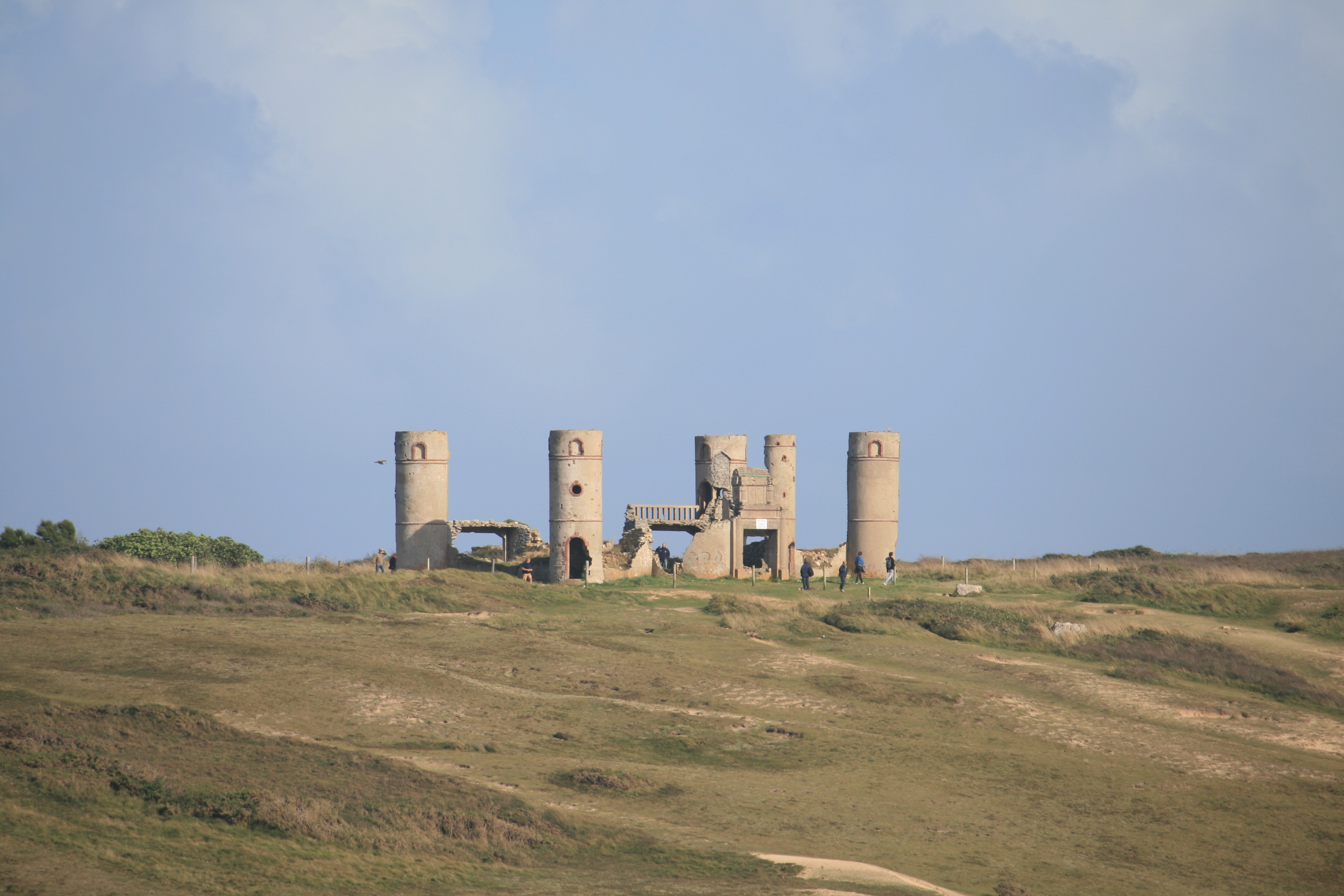
Ruin of Saint-Pol-Roux Manor

The Crozon peninsula was occupied by German troops in the Battle of France. A drunken German soldier invaded the manor during the night of 22 to 23 June 1940. He killed the family's faithful governess Rose with several gun shots and wounded Saint-Pol-Roux's daughter Divine with a bullet. It is often said that the soldier also raped Divine, something she later refuted. Saint-Pol-Roux was wounded, but managed to survive the tragedy, as the German soldier fled, frightened by the house dog. The case greatly embarrassed the German military authorities. German military authorities arrested the culprit already on 23 June 1940. He was tried by the German court martial in Brest, sentenced to death and executed.

Divine was taken to a hospital in Brest, where she was treated until 15 April 1941. Saint-Pol-Roux was deeply affected by the death of Rose, the injuries of his daughter and the blows he had received. While commuting between the hospital in Brest and Camaret he learned that the mansion had been visited again. The mansion was looted on 3 October 1940. The various rooms of the manor, in particular its bedroom and its study, were in great disorder. Manuscripts of several works on which that Saint-Pol-Roux had been working for several years had been torn or burned.

When he saw the disaster, he understood that it would be impossible for him to reconstruct his work and felt an immense despair. Saint-Pol-Roux suffered an uremic crisis and was transported to the hospital in Brest on 13 October 1940. He died on 18 October 1940. Louis Aragon published an article on the "assassination" of Saint-Pol-Roux, as he called it. The article was called "Saint-Pol Roux, ou L'Espoir" and published in the journal Poésie a month after the death of Saint-Pol-Roux. It was the first article published by Aragon after the fall of France, and was censored by the Vichy authorities.

The manor was occupied by the German military during World War II, used by the Marine Flak Abteilung 804 as a command center. The unit was dedicated to coastal anti-aircraft defense and the German army eventually installed two French Lahitolle 95 mm cannons at the gates of the manor. The manor was bombed several times by Allied airforces and eventually burned down on 11 October 1944, only seven days before the liberation of Camaret.

=== A forgotten poet ===
On the Liberation, Divine tried in vain to ensure that her father's work was not forgotten. It is in large part due to the salvage work, editing and publication of editions of his work by René Rougerie during those years, which she called "purgatory", that his poems, essays and plays that had escaped Nazi barbarism were edited and re-edited anew. A considerable number of unedited manuscripts (Le Trésor de l'Homme, La Répoétique) survived the pillaging.

Saint-Pol-Roux is the archetypal "forgotten poet". It was under this title that he was a dedicatee of André Breton's Clair de Terre (also dedicated to "ceux qui comme lui s'offrent le magnifique plaisir de se faire oublier (sic)", or "those who like him offered themselves the great pleasure of making themselves forgotten"), and Vercors's Le Silence de la mer (calling him "le poète assassiné", or "the assassinated poet").

== Corpus ==
Saint-Pol-Roux attempted to create a total work of art. This dream of Symbolist literature consisted of creating a perfect work responding to all the senses. Saint-Pol-Roux himself was therefore very interested in plays and operas during his Parisian years. At the end of his life, he marvelled at the artistic possibilities offered by the cinema.

Saint-Pol-Roux equally created the notion of "idéoréalisme". He desired an artistic fusion between the real world and the world of ideas in a Neoplatonic perspective. He imagined a cosmology in which Beauty - lost in the real world - has to be revealed by the poet.

== Works ==
Under the name Paul Roux

- Maman!, Ollendorff, 1883
- Garçon d'honneur, Ollendorff, 1883
- Le Poète, Ghio, 1883
- Un drôle de mort, Ghio, 1884
- Rêve de duchesse, Ghio, 1884
- La Ferme, Ghio, 1886

Under the name Saint-Pol-Roux

- Les Reposoirs de la procession, vol 1., Mercure de France, 1893
- L'Épilogue des saisons humaines, Mercure de France 1893
- La Dame à la faux, Mercure de France, 1899
- Les Reposoirs de la procession, vol. I : La Rose et les épines du chemin, Mercure de France, 1901
- Anciennetés, Mercure de France, 1903
- Les Reposoirs de la procession, vol. II : De la colombe au corbeau par le paon, Mercure de France, 1904
- Les Reposoirs de la procession, vol. III : Les Féeries intérieures, Mercure de France, 1907
- Les Fééries intérieures, 1907
- La Mort du Berger, Broulet, Brest, 1938, 69 p.
- La Supplique du Christ, 1939.

Posthumously published

- Bretagne est Univers, Broulet, Brest, 1941
- Florilège Saint-Pol-Roux, L'Amitié par le Livre, 1943
- Anciennetés, Seuil, 1946
- L'Ancienne à la coiffe innombrable, Éd. du Fleuve, Nantes, 1946
- Août, Broder, 1958
- Saint-Pol-Roux "Les plus belles pages", Mercure de France, 1966
- Le Trésor de l'homme, Rougerie, Mortemart, 1970
- La Répoétique, Rougerie, Mortemart, 1971
- Cinéma vivant, Rougerie, Mortemart, 1972
- Vitesse, Rougerie, Mortemart, 1973
- Les Traditions de l'avenir, Rougerie, Mortemart, 1974
- Saint-Pol-Roux / Victor Segalen, Correspondance, Rougerie, Mortemart, 1975
- La Transfiguration de la guerre, Rougerie, Mortemart, 1976
- Genèses, Rougerie, Mortemart, 1976
- La Randonnée, Rougerie, Mortemart, 1977
- De l'art magnifique, Rougerie, Mortemart, 1978
- La Dame à la faulx, Rougerie, Mortemart, 1979
- Les Reposoirs de la procession, vol. I : La Rose et les épines du chemin, Rougerie, Mortemart, 1980
- Les Reposoirs de la procession, vol. II : De la colombe au corbeau par le paon, Rougerie, Mortemart, 1980
- Les Reposoirs de la procession, vol. III : Les Féeries intérieures, Rougerie, Mortemart, 1981
- Le Tragique dans l'homme, vol. I : Les Personnages de l'individu, Les Saisons humaines, Tristan la Vie, Rougerie, Mortemart, 1983
- Le Tragique dans l'homme, vol. II : Monodrames, L'Âme noire du prieur blanc, Fumier, Rougerie, Mortemart, 1984
- Tablettes. 1885-1895, Rougerie, Mortemart, 1986
- Idéoréalités. 1895-1914, Rougerie, Mortemart, 1987
- Glorifications. 1914-1930, Rougerie, Mortemart, 1992
- Vendanges, Rougerie, Mortemart, 1993
- La Besace du solitaire, Rougerie, Mortemart, 2000 ISBN 2-85668-065-8
- Les Ombres tutélaires, Rougerie, Mortemart, 2005 ISBN 2-85668-112-3

== Bibliography ==
- Aragon, Louis (1945). Saint-Pol-Roux ou l'espoir (in French). Brest: Seghers.
- Bergot, Auguste (1947). Le Solitaire de Camaret (in French). Brest: Poésia. p. 158.
- Bergot, Auguste (1950). Épaves du Magnifique (in French). Brest: Poésia. p. 96.
- Briant, Théophile (1951). Saint-Pol-Roux (in French). Paris.
- Pelleau, Paul (1946). Saint-Pol-Roux, le crucifié (in French). Paris: Éd. du fleuve. p. 206.
