= Jean-Pierre Siméon =

French writer

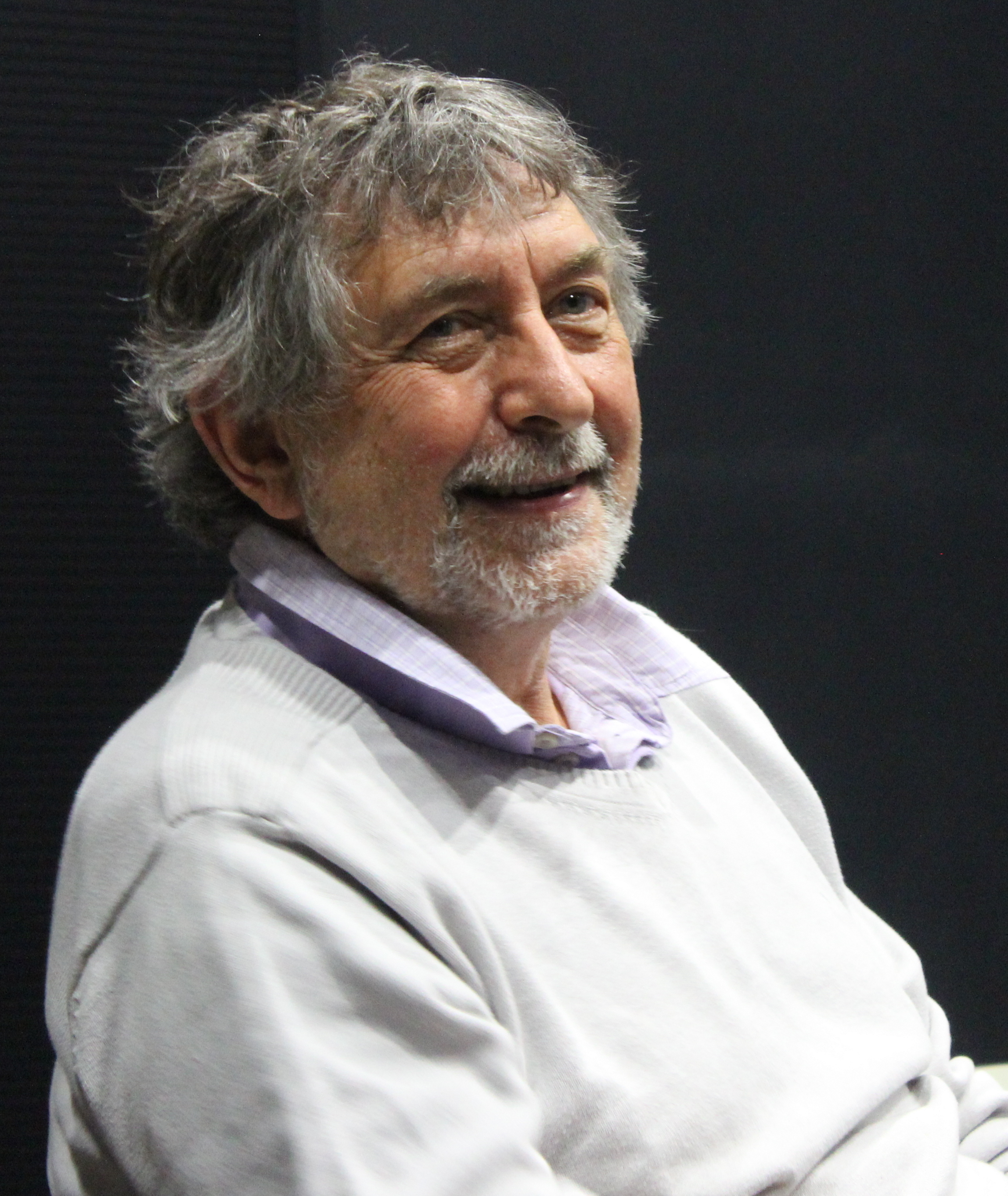
- Jean-Pierre Siméon (2017)
- Born: 6 May 1950 (age 76); Paris, France
- Occupation: Poet
- Writing career
- Language: French
- Notable works: Stabat Mater Furiosa (2000); Lettre à la femme aimée au sujet de la mort (2005); La poésie sauvera le monde (2011)
- Notable awards: Commander, Ordre des Arts et des Lettres (2019); Prix Antonin-Artaud (1984); Prix Guillaume Apollinaire (1994); Prix Max-Jacob (2006); Poetry Prize of the Lucian Blaga International Poetry Festival (2010); Grand prix de poésie of the Académie française (2022); Golden Wreath Laureate of the Struga Poetry Evenings and Golden Magnolia of the Shanghai International Poetry Festival (2024)

Jean-Pierre Siméon (French pronunciation: [ʒɑ̃pjɛʁ si.me.ɔ̃]; born 6 May 1950) is a French poet, novelist, dramatist and translator. Siméon's publications have been awarded various national and international poetry prizes. His poetry and theater works are translated into around fifteen languages.

== Early life and academic pursuits ==
Jean-Pierre Siméon was born in Paris (France) in May 1950. His mother, Denise, was a teacher and his father, Roger, made a career in the national education administration and became head of publications at the University of Clermont-Ferrand where the family settled in 1962.

His grand-father, Edelweiss, was a singer in Montmartre and his uncle, Michel Siméon, was a painter and illustrator.

He studied literature at the University of Clermont-Ferrand. In 1974, he passed his aggregation in Modern Literature and became a teacher. He has taught at the University Institute for Teachers Training (IUFM), the National School of Theatre Arts and Techniques (ENSATT), and the Institute for Political Sciences.

== Writing career ==
In 1977, with his father and a group of poets from Auvergne, he was one of the founders of the ARPA (Poetry magazine), of which he was director.

He was the founder of Semaine de la poésie (“Poetry Week”) in Clermont-Ferrand in 1987.

He began writing for L'Humanité in the 90's.

In 1991, he founded and directed, with Jean-Marie Barnaud, the Grands fonds collection at Éditions Cheyne.

From 2001 to 2017 he was the art director of Printemps des poètes (“The Spring of Poets”), recipient of the Prix Goncourt de la poésie 2016.

From 2001 to 2019 he was an associate poet of the Théâtre National Populaire in Villeurbanne.

He is the director of the Éditions Gallimard Poetry collection since 2018.

== Tributes ==
The library of Saint-Brice-en-Coglès Jean-Pierre Siméon was named in his honour.

== Selected works ==
- Traquer la louve (1978)
- Fuite de l'immobile (1984)
- Le Sentiment du monde (1994)
- Stabat Mater Furiosa - translated in german by Daniel Gerzenberg and in romanian language by Magda Carneci, Soliloques (1999)
- D'entre les morts (2000)
- Charles Juliet, la conquête dans l'obscur (2003)
- Sermons joyeux : de la lente corruption des âmes dans la nuit tombante (2004)
- Lettre à la femme aimée au sujet de la mort (2005) - translated in chinese by Shu Cai, in dutch by Lucienne Stassaert, in macedonian by Jordan Plevnes, in romanian by Dinu Flămând and in slovene language by Nadja Dobnik
- Le bois de hêtres, Le sentiment du monde, La question et la preuve (2005) - Prix Guillaume Apollinaire
- Ceci est un poème qui guérit les poissons (2005) - translated in chinese, croatian, english, german, greek, hebrew, hindi, italian, korean, portuguese and spanish language
- Le testament de Vanda (2009)
- Philoctète : Variation à partir de Sophocle (2009)
- Électre : Variation à partir de Sophocle (2011)
- Ce que signifiait Laurent Terzieff (2011)
- Et ils me cloueront sur le bois : poème dramatique (2013)
- La poésie sauvera le monde (2016) - translated in german by Sidona Bauer and in romanian language by Dinu Flămând
- La Politique de la beauté (2018) - translated in romanian language by Dinu Flămând
- Levez-vous du tombeau : poèmes (2019)
- Petite éloge de la poésie (2021) - translated in spanish by Audomaro Hidalgo, in turkish language by Hanife Güven
- Une théorie de l'amour (2021) - translated in slovene language by Nadia Dobnik
- Avenirs, Le peintre au coquelicot (2024)
- Un non pour un oui (2026)

=== Translated in english ===
- Stabat Mater Furiosa (translated by Michael West, 2009). From 1999 to 2023, more than 140 productions were staged in France and abroad, the play was translated into 9 languages and performed in 22 countries.
- Oh Joyous Sermons! A Case Study in Translation of Mock Sermons for the Modern World (translated by Fabienne Pizot-Haymore, 2011)
- This Is a Poem That Heals Fish (translated by Claudia Zoe Bedrick, 2017, selected for The Best of Brain Pickings 2017)

=== As a translator ===
- Michael West (translated with Loïc Brabant), Foley (2006)
- Carolyn Carlson, Brins d'herbe (2011)
- Carolyn Carlson, Dialogue avec Rothko : une lecture de "Untitled : black, red over black on red" (2011)
- Carolyn Carlson, Traces d'encre (2013)
- Carolyn Carlson, Au bord de l'infini : suivi de Dialogue avec Rothko : poésie (2019)
- Carolyn Carlson, Un saut dans le bleu (2025)

== Awards ==
- Prix Antonin-Artaud (1984)
- Prix Guillaume Apollinaire (1994)
- Prix Max-Jacob (2006)
- Poetry Prize of the Lucian Blaga International Poetry Festival (2010)
- Grand prix de poésie of the Académie française (2022)
- Golden Wreath Laureate of the Struga Poetry Evenings (2024)
- Golden Magnolia of the Shanghai International Poetry Festival (2024)

== Sources ==
- Bonhomme, Béatrice, ed. (2025). Jean-Pierre Siméon. Nu(e) 90.
