= Académie Mallarmé =

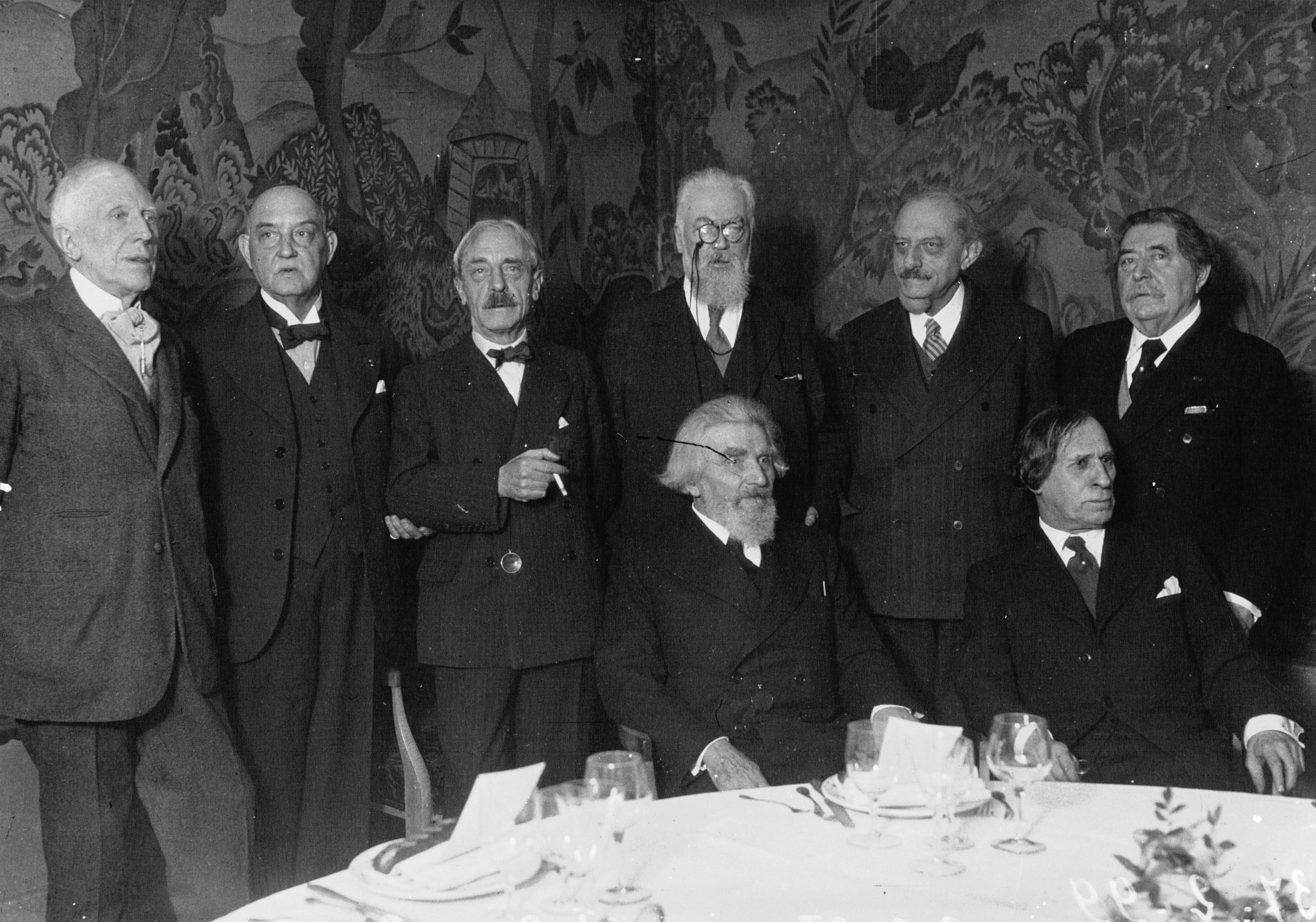
Quelques-uns des membres fondateurs en 1937. De gauche à droite : Debout : Édouard Dujardin, Francis Vielé-Griffin, Paul Valéry, André-Ferdinand Herold, André Fontainas, Jean Ajalbert. Assis : Saint-Pol-Roux, Paul Fort.

The Académie Mallarmé is a French literary academy of writers and poets, founded in 1937. Since 1976, the Académie has awarded the Prix Mallarmé literary prize at the Brive book fair.

Founding members include Paul Valéry, Édouard Dujardin, André Fontainas, Charles Vildrac, Maurice Maeterlinck, Ferdinand Hérold, Albert Mockel, Léon-Paul Fargue, Francis Viélé-Griffin, Paul Fort, Saint-Pol-Roux, Valéry Larbaud, and Jean Ajalbert. When asked, André Gide, Francis Jammes and Paul Claudel declined the invitation to become founding members.

Later, Jean Cocteau, Gérard d'Houville, Henry Charpentier, Jacques Audiberti, and Henri Mondor became members.

In 2008, Academy members include Jean L'Anselme, Jean-Michel Maulpoix, Robert Sabatier, Sylvestre Clancier, Abdellatif Laâbi, Venus Ghoury-Ghata, Andrée Chedid, Anise Koltz, Philippe Jones, Jean Portante, Robert Marteau, François Montmaneix, Jean Orizet, Claude Beausoleil, Dominique Grandmont, Marie-Claire Bancquart, Claude Vigée, Richard Rognet, Charles Dobzynski, Pierre Oster, Lionel Ray, Édouard Maunick, Jean Pérol, Bernard Mazo, Philippe Delaveau, Pierre Dhainaut, Henri Meschonnic, Michel Deguy, Alexandre Voisard, Max Alhau, Claudine Helft...

Nowadays Académie Mallarmé continues to function and elects new members, such as René Depestre and Alain Duault in 2025. Its most recent laureates are Valeriu Stancu in 2025 and Alain Breton in 2024.
