= Claude Mourthé =

French writer and film director (1932–2024)

- Born: 6 March 1932; Cazères, France
- Died: 13 March 2024 (aged 92); Agen, France
- Education: University of Toulouse
- Occupations: Writer; Film director

Claude Mourthé (6 March 1932 – 13 March 2024) was a French writer, translator and film director.

== Biography ==
Born in Cazères on 6 March 1932, Mourthé earned a degree in modern literature from the University of Toulouse. He worked as a radio director from 1959 to 1993 and as a television director for TF1 from 1974 to 1989. He was also a producer for France Culture. He was a critic for Le Magazine Littéraire and Le Figaro Magazine.

Mourthé was the author of a dozen books, including Soudain l'éternité, which won him the Prix Chateaubriand et du rayonnement français. He received the Prix Guillaume Apollinaire in 1999 for his collection Dit plus bas.

Claude Mourthé died in Agen on 13 March 2024, at the age of 92.

== Works ==
=== Novels ===
- La Caméra (1970)
- Amour noir (1971)
- Lettre à un mort (1971)
- L'enlèvement (1972)
- Un pas dans la forêt (1976)
- Le Temps des fugues (1980)
- L'Amour parfait (1986)
- Le printemps fou (1992)
- Une mort de théâtre (1994)
- Paysage changeant (1996)
- La Perspective amoureuse (1996)
- Un état de mélancolie (1997)
- Soudain, l'éternité (1998)

=== Poetry ===
- Nuit demeure (1994)
- Dit plus bas (1999)
- Voici l'homme (2000)
- Engrammes (2002)
- Opus incertain (2018)

=== Essays ===
- Giono l'Italien (1995)
- Shakespeare (2006)
- Shakespeare, scènes célèbres (2008)
- Shakespeare, Comme il vous plaira (2016)

== Decorations ==
- Cross for Military Valour
- Officer of the Ordre des Arts et des Lettres
