= André Fontainas =

Belgian Symbolist poet and critic

André Fontainas (1865–1948) was a Belgian Symbolist poet and critic. He was born in Brussels. He spent much of his life in France. He taught at Lycee Fontaines. He was a member of the Académie Mallarmé.

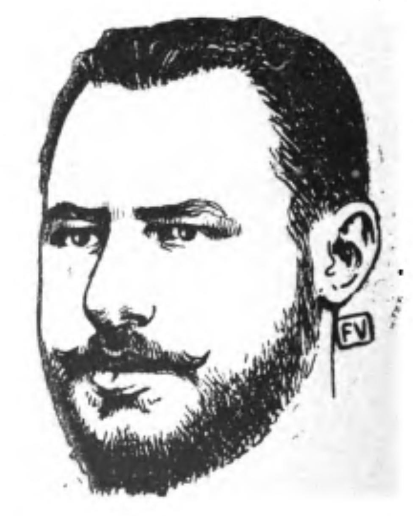
Portrait of André Fontainas, was a Belgian Symbolist poet.

== Works ==
=== Poetry ===
- Le sang des fleurs, Imprimerie Veuve Monnom, 1889
- Fontainas, André (1892). Les Vergers illusoires. Librairie de l'art indépendant. "André Fontainas."
- Nuits d'Epiphanie 1894
- Les Estuaires d'ombre, 1896
- Crépuscules, 1897
- L'Eau du Fleuve, 1897
- Fontainas, André (1901). Le Jardin des îles claires: poèmes. Mercure de France. "André Fontainas."
- La nef désemparée: poèmes. Société du Mercure de France. 1908. p. 5. "André Fontainas."
- Fontainas, André (1921). L'Allée des glaïeuls: cinq odes et un sonnet dédiés à Paul Valéry. Librairie de France. "André Fontainas."
- L'oeuvre d'André Fontainas, Marguerite Bervoets (ed), Palais des Académies, 1949
- Choix de poèmes, Mercure de France, 1950

=== Novel ===
- Fontainas, André (1899). L'ornement de la solitude: roman. Société du Mercure de France. "André Fontainas."

=== Memoirs ===
- Mes souvenirs du symbolisme, La Nouvelle revue critique, 1928
- Confession d'un poète, Mercure de France, 1936

=== Non-fiction ===
- Fontainas, André (1906). Histoire de la peinture française au XIXme siècle (1801-1900). Société du Mercure de France. "André Fontainas."
- Frans Hals, H. Laurens 1908
- Fontainas, André (1919). La vie d'Edgar A. Poe: avec un portrait en héliogravure. Mercure de France. "André Fontainas."
- Courbet, F. Alcan, 1921
- La peinture de Daumier, G. Crès et cie, 1923
- Constantin Meunier, Alcan, 1923
- Rops, F. Alcan, 1925
- Constable, Translator Wilfrid Scarborough Jackson, John Lane, 1927
- Bonnard, Librairie de France, 1928
- Dans la lignée de Baudelaire, La Nouvelle revue critique, 1930
- Tableau de la poésie française d'aujourd'hui, La Nouvelle revue critique, 1931
- L'Antisémitisme: son histoire et ses causes, J. Crès, 1934
