= Cécile Coulon =

French novelist, poet and short story writer

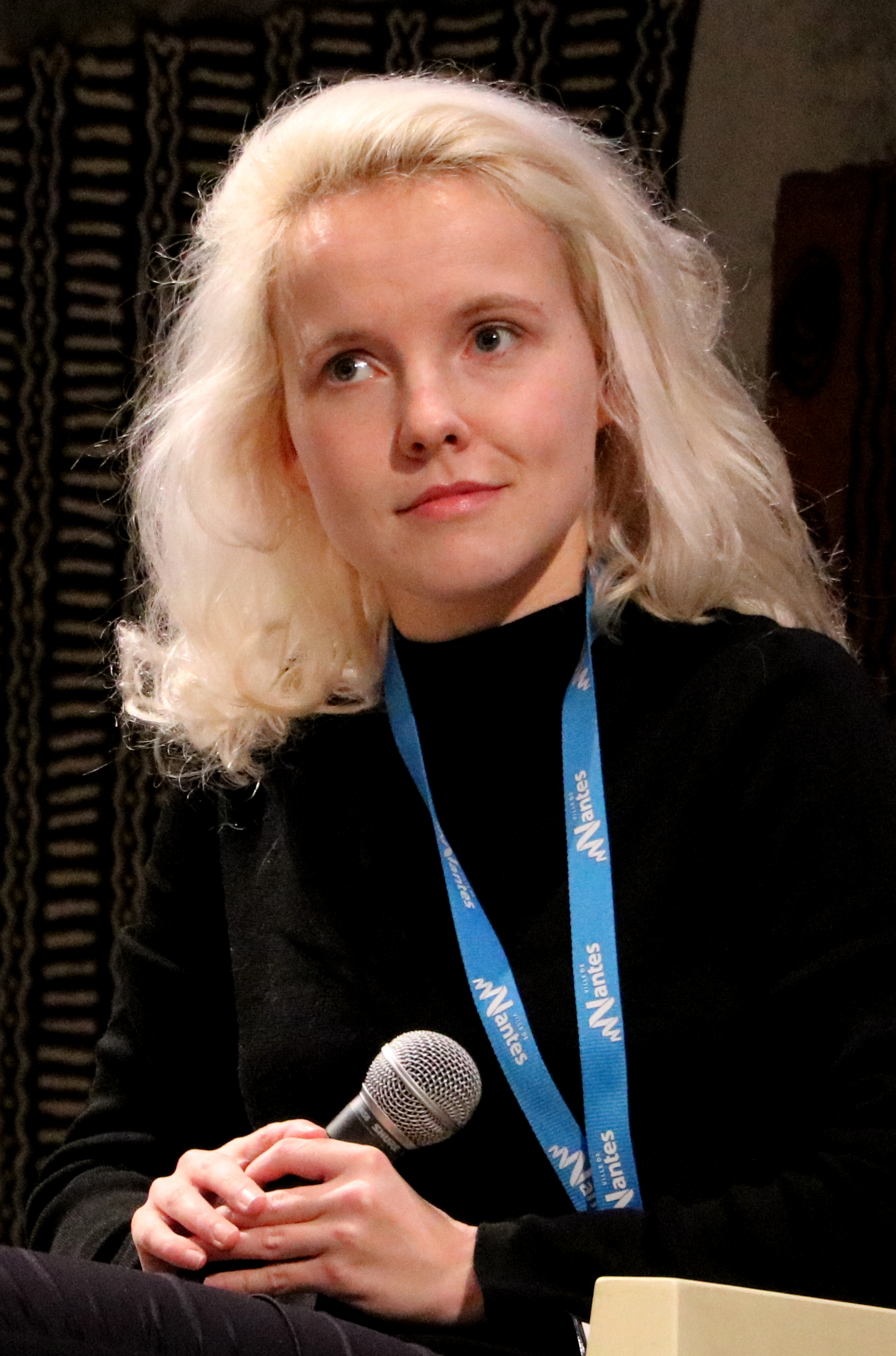
- Cécile Coulon in 2018
- Born: 13 June 1990 (age 36); Saint-Saturnin, France
- Education: Blaise Pascal University
- Occupations: Novelist, poet, short story writer
- Writing career
- Language: French
- Years active: 2007–present
- Notable works: Le roi n'a pas sommeil (2012); Trois saisons d'orage (2017); Une bête au paradis (2019)

Cécile Coulon (born 13 June 1990) is a French novelist, poet and short story writer. As of 2020, she has published seven novels, two poetry collections and one short story collection. She has been awarded the Prix des libraires (2017) and the prix Guillaume Apollinaire (2018)

== Early life and education ==
Coulon was born on 13 June 1990 in Saint-Saturnin, Puy-de-Dôme. She wrote her first novel at age 16, while she was still a student. Coulon passed the baccalauréat, with the cinema option. After taking a Hypokhâgne and a Khâgne course, she pursued studies in Modern Literature at Blaise Pascal University in Clermont-Ferrand.

== Career ==
In 2007, Coulon's first novel, entitled Le Voleur de vie, was published by Éditions Revoir.

In 2010, her second novel Méfiez-vous des enfants sages was published by Éditions Viviane Hamy.

In 2012, her third novel Le roi n'a pas sommeil was published by Éditions Viviane Hamy. It was awarded the prix Mauvais genres, a prize created that same year by France Culture and Le Nouvel Observateur. It also won the Prix Coup de foudre at Vendanges Littéraires in Rivesaltes. It was also a finalist for the prix France Culture-Télérama at the Salon du Livre de Paris. In 2014, Le roi n'a pas sommeil was a finalist for the Prix du Meilleur Roman des lecteurs de Points, a literary award from newspaper Le Point.

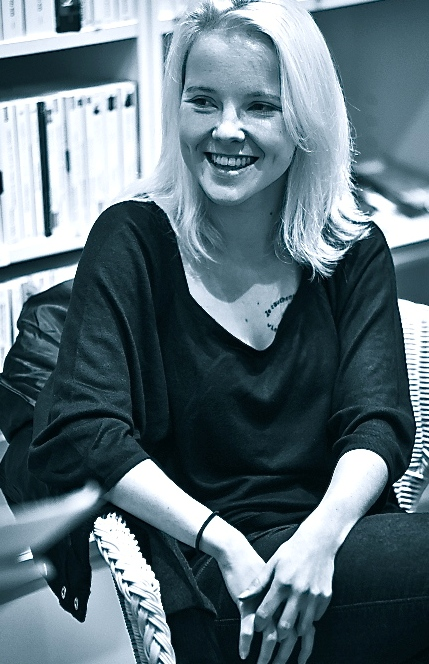
Coulon in Strasbourg, November 2013.

In 2013, her fourth novel Le Rire du grand blessé was published by Éditions Viviane Hamy. It was a finalist for the 2015 Prix littéraire des jeunes Européens. Coulon was the president of the jury of the 2013 prix Mauvais genres.

In 2015, Coulon's fifth novel Le Cœur du pélican was published by Éditions Viviane Hamy. As of 2016, Coulon is completing a thesis on the link between literature and sport.

In 2017, her sixth novel, Trois saisons d'orage, was published by Éditions Viviane Hamy. It was awarded the 2017 Prix des libraires.

In 2017, Coulon collaborated with video game studio Small Bang. She adapted Homer's epic poem, the Iliad, into a storyline for their video game Diorama.

In 2018, Coulon's first poetry collection, Les Ronces, was published by Le Castor Astral. Les Ronces was awarded the 2018 prix Guillaume Apollinaire. It was also awarded the prix Révélation de poésie from the Société des gens de lettres.

In March 2018, Coulon participated in the 7th edition of the Paris des Femmes theatre festival at the théâtre des Mathurins in Paris. Coulon's play, titled On se remet de tout, was a one-woman show performed by Bénédicte Choisnet. On se remet de tout appeared with those of the other playwrights in the collection À vendre: neuf pièces courtes, with a preface by Leïla Slimani. À vendre was published by Collection des Quatre-Vents, a publishing house of L'avant-scène theater.

In May 2018, Coulon sent a letter to open the debates at the Etats Généraux du Livre. The letter was read by fellow writer Carole Zalberg. In it, Coulon humorously criticizes the pauperization of authors in France and warns of the catastrophic effects of the announced increase in the contribution sociale généralisée (CSG) on their relatively low income, without affording them any new social rights. At the time, Coulon was on a jury at the Centre national du cinéma et de l'image animée (CNC), a jury which awards grants for video games that are in production.

In 2019, Coulon's seventh novel Une bête au paradis was published by Éditions de l'Iconoclaste. It was awarded the 2019 prix littéraire du Monde. The novel centers around the life of an orphan taken in by her peasant grandmother.

== Works ==
=== Novels ===
- — (2007). Le Voleur de vie. Éditions Revoir. ISBN 978-2-35265-009-6.
- — (2010). Méfiez-vous des enfants sages. Éditions Viviane Hamy. ISBN 978-2-87858-332-8.
- — (2012). Le roi n'a pas sommeil. Éditions Viviane Hamy. ISBN 978-2-87858-509-4.
- — (2013). Le Rire du grand blessé. Éditions Viviane Hamy. ISBN 978-2-87858-584-1.
- — (2015). Le Cœur du pélican. Éditions Viviane Hamy. ISBN 978-2-87858-601-5.
- — (2017). Trois saisons d'orage. Éditions Viviane Hamy. ISBN 978-2-87858-337-3.
- — (2019). Une bête au paradis. Éditions de l'Iconoclaste. ISBN 978-2-378-80078-9.
- — (2021). Seule en sa demeure. Éditions de l'Iconoclaste. ISBN 978-2-378-80240-0.
- — (2024). La langue des choses cachées. Éditions de l'Iconoclaste. ISBN 978-2-37880-404-6.
- — (2026). Le Visage de la nuit. Éditions de l'Iconoclaste. ISBN 978-2378805715.

=== Short story collection ===
- — (2008). Sauvages. Éditions Revoir. ISBN 978-2-35265-015-7.

=== Poetry ===
- — (2018). Les Ronces. Le Castor Astral. ISBN 979-1-02780-169-5.
- — (2020). Noir Volcan. Le Castor Astral. ISBN 979-10-278-0244-9.
- — (2022). En l'absence du capitaine. Le Castor Astral. ISBN 979-10-278-0314-9.

=== Theatre ===
- "On se remet de tout". À vendre: neuf pièces courtes. L'avant-scène théâtre, Collection des quatre vents. 2018. ISBN 9782749814124.

== Awards and honors ==
- Winner – 2012 Prix Coup de foudre at Vendanges Littéraires for Le roi n'a pas sommeil
- Winner – 2012 Prix Mauvais genres (Fiction) for Le roi n'a pas sommeil
- Finalist – 2012 Prix France Culture-Télérama for Le roi n'a pas sommeil
- Finalist – 2012 Franz-Hessel-Preis for Le roi n'a pas sommeil
- Finalist – 2014 Prix du Meilleur roman des lecteurs de Points for Le roi n'a pas sommeil
- Finalist – 2015 Prix littéraire des jeunes Européens for Le Rire du grand blessé
- Finalist – 2017 Prix du Livre Inter for Trois saisons d'orage
- Winner – 2017 Prix des libraires for Trois saisons d'orage
- Winner – 2018 Prix SGDL révélation de poésie for Les Ronces
- Winner – 2018 Prix Guillaume Apollinaire for Les Ronces
- Winner – 2019 Prix littéraire du Monde for Une bête au paradis
