= Bernard Chambaz =

French writer, historian and poet (born 1949)

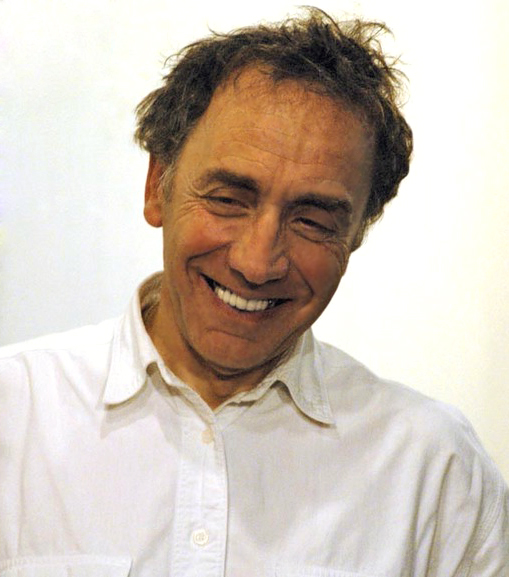
Bernard Chambaz

Bernard Chambaz (born 18 May 1949 in Boulogne-Billancourt) is a French writer, historian and poet, winner of several French literary prizes.

== Selected bibliography ==
Poetry

- 1983: & le plus grand poème par-dessus bord jeté, Seghers
- 1985: Corpus, Messidor
- 1987: Vers l'infini milieu des années quatre-vingt, Seghers
- 1992: Italiques deux, Seghers
- 1997: Entre-temps, Flammarion
- 1999: Échoir, Flammarion
- 2005: Été, Flammarion
- 2010: Été II, Flammarion

Essais

- 1987: Le Principe Renaissance, la Sétérée
- 1989: La Dialectique Véronèse, La Sétérée
- 1999: Œil noir (Degas), Flohic
- 2001: Autoportrait sous les arbres, Flohic
- 2003: La Déposition, with Jean-Pierre Schneider, Le Temps qu'il fait
- 2006: Ecce Homo (Rembrandt), Éditions Desclée de Brouwer
- 2010: Le vif du sujet, Le Temps qu'il fait
- 2014: Petite philosophie du vélo, Flammarion
- 2016: À tombeau ouvert, Stock

Novels

- 1992: L'Arbre de vies, F. Bourin; Points-Seuil, (Prix Goncourt du premier roman)
- 1995: L'Orgue de Barbarie, Seuil,
- 1997: La Tristesse du roi, Seuil
- 1998: Le Pardon aux oiseaux, Seuil
- 2000: Une fin d'après-midi dans les jardins du zoo, Seuil
- 2014: Dernières nouvelles du martin-pêcheur, Flammarion
- 2015: Vladimir Vladimirovitch, Flammarion

=== Series Mes disparitions ===
- 2005: Kinopanorama, Panama
- 2007: Yankee, Panama
- 2010: Ghetto, Seuil

Travel narrations

- 2003: Petit voyage d'Alma-Ata à Achkhabad, Seuil
- 2003: À mon tour, Seuil
- 2007: Evviva l'Italia : ballade, Éditions Panama
- 2013: Portugal, Bourin Éditeur

Narrations

- 1994: Martin cet été, Julliard
- 2011: Plonger, Gallimard
- 2012: Caro carissimo Puccini, Gallimard

Other

- 2004: L'Humanité (1904–2004), Seuil
- 2006: Des nuages, Seuil
- 2011: Marathon(s), Seuil

== Prizes and honours ==
- 1993: Prix Goncourt du premier roman for L'Arbre de vies, François Bourin, 1992
- 1994: Prix Paul Vaillant-Couturier for Martin cet été, Julliard
- 2005: Prix Apollinaire for Eté, Flammarion, 2005
- 2009: Prix Louis-Guilloux for Yankee (éditions du Panama, 2008)
- 2014: Prix Louis-Nucera, Prix Roland de Jouvenel of the Académie française and Grand prix de littérature sportive for Dernières nouvelles du martin-pêcheur (Flammarion)
