= Claude Adelen =

French poet and literary critic (born 1944)

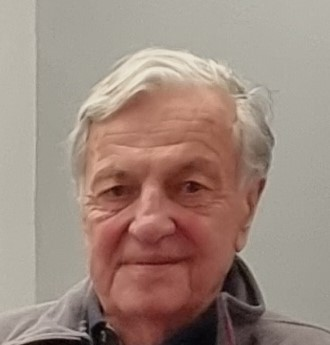
Claude Adelen in 2021

Claude Adelen (born 23 May 1944, Paris) is a French poet and literary critic.

== Works ==
- 1968: Ordre du jour, Paris, Éditions Pierre Jean Oswald, 79 p. BnF 352046408
- 1975: Bouche à la terre, Paris, Action poétique, 46 p. BnF 34677480p
- 1977: Légendaire, Paris, Les Éditeurs réunis, series "Petite sirène", 94 p. ISBN 2-201-01449-3
- 1985: Marches forcées, Baillé, France, URSA, 72 p. ISBN 2-86934-002-8
- 1989: Intempéries, Moulins, France, Éditions Ipomée, series "Tadorne ", 167 p. ISBN 2-86485-081-8
- 1995: Le Nom propre de l'amour, Bruxelles, Belgique, Éditions Le Cri, series "In'hui", 110 p. ISBN 2-87106-152-1
- 2001: Aller où rien ne parle. Un choix, 1996-2000, Tours, France, Éditions Farrago, series "Biennale internationale des poètes en Val-de-Marne", 60 p. ISBN 2-84490-077-1
- 2002: Soleil en mémoire, Creil - Reims, France, Éditions Dumerchez, series "Double hache", 142 p. ISBN 2-912927-60-9

- Prix Guillaume Apollinaire 2002

- 2005: D'où pas même la voix, Liancourt, France, Éditions Dumerchez, series "Double hache", 85 p. ISBN 2-84791-054-9

- Prix Louise-Labé

- 2009: Légendaire. 1969-2005, Paris, Éditions Flammarion, series "Poésie", 322 p. ISBN 978-2-08-122182-6

- Prix Théophile-Gautier 2010, médaille de bronze

- 2012: Obligé d'être ici, Sens, France, Éditions Obsidiane, 93 p. ISBN 978-2-916447-47-6

Literary critic

- 1995: Henri Deluy, une passion de l'immédiat, Paris, Éditions Fourbis, 228 p. ISBN 2-907374-94-X
- 2004: L'Émotion concrète. Chroniques de poésie, Chambéry, France, Éditions Comp'Act, series "Le corps certain", 275 p. ISBN 2-87661-300-X
