= François Montmaneix =

French poet and writer (1938–2018)

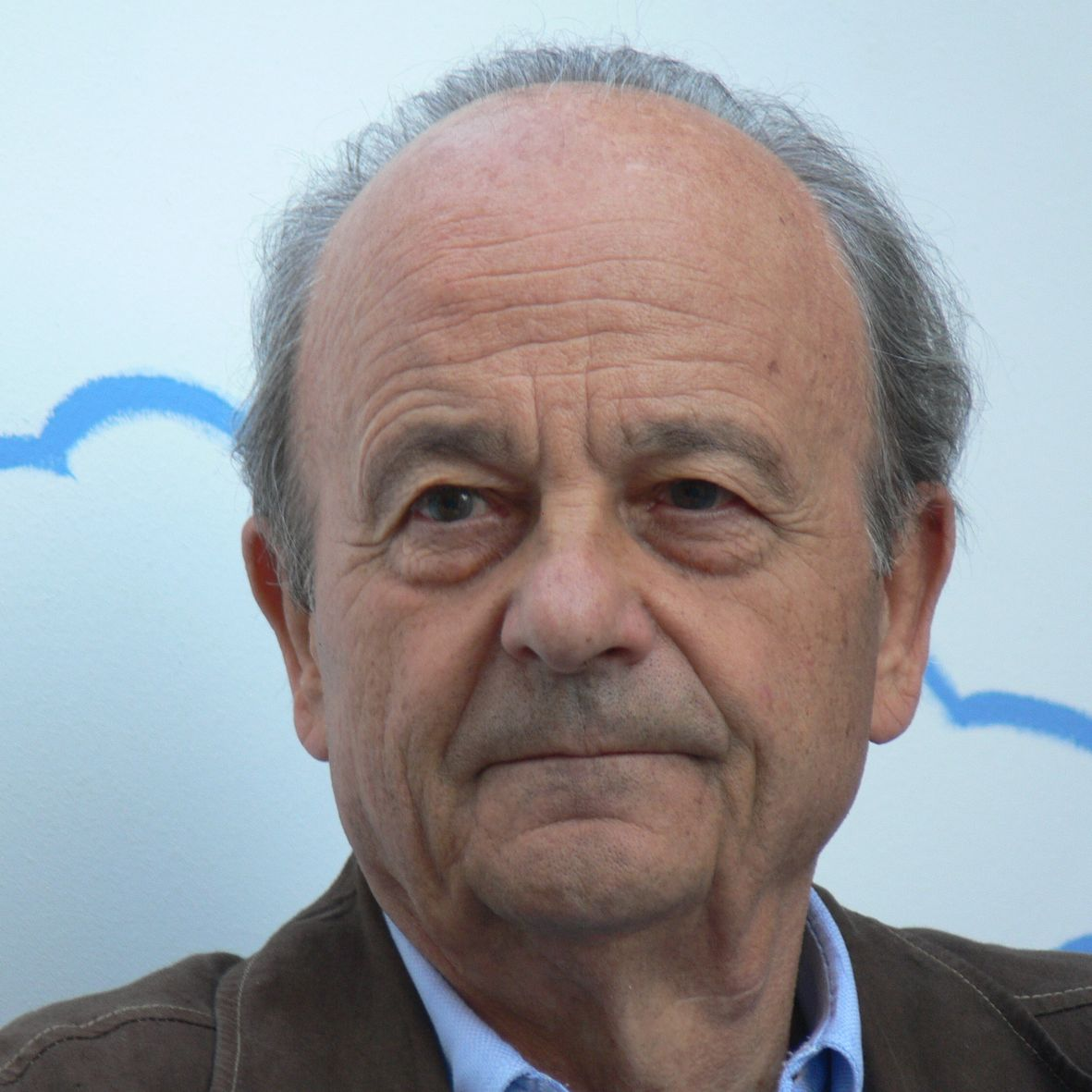

François Montmaneix (June 4, 1938 in Lyon – October 21, 2018 in Lyon) was a French poet and writer.

== Biography ==
François Montmaneix was for many years an important player in Lyon's cultural life, directing the Maurice-Ravel auditorium, where he created the Artrium, an exhibition gallery, and Le Rectangle, center of art, place Bellecour. A founding member of the Prix Roger-Kowalski, poetry prize of the city of Lyon created in 1984, he was also president of the Académie Mallarmé.

== Publications ==
- 2015: Saisons profondes, La rumeur libre Éditions
- 2015: Œuvres poétiques, tomes 1 et 2, Postface by Jean-Yves Debreuille, La rumeur libre Éditions
- 2012: Laisser verdure, Préface d'Yves Bonnefoy, Le Castor Astral, Prix Théophile-Gautier 2013 of the Académie française
- 2008: L'Abîme horizontal, Éditions La Différence, Prix Alain Bosquet 2008
- 2005: Jours de nuit, Éditions Le Cherche Midi
- 2002: Les Rôles invisibles, Le Cherche Midi, prix Guillaume Apollinaire 2003
- 1997: Vivants, Le Cherche Midi, Prix AU.TR.ES 1997 (authors, translators, essayists) Prix Rhône-Alpes de Littérature
- 1990: L'Autre versant du feu, Éditions Belfond, Prix Louise-Labé 1991
- 1985: Visage de l'eau, Belfond, Prix RTL/Poésie1 1987
- 1980: Le Livre des ruines, Belfond
- 1974: Le Dé, Guy Chambelland éditeur
- 1970: L'Ocre de l'air, Guy Chambelland
- 1967: L'Arbre intérieur, Guy Chambelland

Other works

- 1977: Landstriche (lithographs by Hans-Martin Erhardt), Manus-Presse, Stuttgart
- 1995: Lyon, de place en place (photographs by Agathe Bay), Éditions Les Sillons du temps
- 2009: Huit heures dans un endroit où je suis né (lithographs by Jacques Truphémus), Éditions Stéphane Bachès
