= Jean-Pierre Schneider =

French painter and scenographer

Jean-Pierre Schneider (born 24 July 1946 in Paris) is a French painter and scenographer. A graduate from the École des beaux-arts de Lille, he has been exhibiting since 1969 in Paris, in the provinces and abroad.

== Exhibitions ==
- 2011: Villa dei Cedri, Bellinzona
- 2010: Grand Théâtre d'Angers - with Étienne Viard
- 2008:
  - Festival du Premier roman, Galerie du Larith, Chambéry
  - Galerie Berthet-Aittouarès, Paris
- 2007:
  - Rencontres contemporaines with Olivier Giroud, Treigny (Yonne)
  - Galerie Pome Turbil, Thonon-les-Bains
- 2006:
  - Galerie Uhde, Toulouse
  - Galerie Pome Turbil-Jacques, Thonon-les-Bains
  - Exposition autour d’une chapelle with Francis Limérat
  - Galerie Sabine Puget à Château Barras (Var)
  - Établissement Marengo-Jolimont, Toulouse
  - Rencontres contemporaines with Olivier Giroud, Treigny
  - Galerie Adama, Bordeaux
  - Galerie Patrick Gauthier, Quimper
  - Bookstore of Thionville with Cheyne-Editeur
  - Bookstore Ombres blanches in Toulouse with Cheyne éditeur
- 2005:
  - Galerie Arts et Lettres, Vevey
  - Galerie Artemisia, Paris
  - Théâtre national de Saintes
- 2004:
  - Galerie Artemisia, Paris
  - Galerie Art/Espace, Thonon-les-Bains
  - Galerie La Passerelle des Arts, Lectoure
  - Cheyne Editeur, Le Chambon-sur-Lignon
  - Galerie Patrick Gauthier, Quimper
- 2003:
  - Centre d'Arts Plastiques, Royan
  - Galerie Sabine Puget, Paris
  - Galerie Art/Espace, Thonon-les-Bains
  - Sainte-Marie-des-Dames
  - ArtParis, Galerie Sabine Puget, Paris
  - Galerie Simon Blais, Montréal
- 2001:
  - Galerie Art/Espace, Thonon-les-Bains
  - Galerie Sabine Puget, Paris
  - École supérieure des arts et de la communication, Pau
- 2000:
  - Theatre of Chartres (Festival Danse au Cœur)
  - Academia de Bellas Artes, Sabadell
  - Old carmel of Tarbes
- 1999:
  - Galerie Sabine Puget, Paris
  - Galerie Bruno Delarue, Paris
  - Galerie J.E. Bernard, Avignon
- 1998:
  - Alliance française, Sabadell
  - Japanese cultural House in Paris (French: Maison de la culture du Japon à Paris), for the reading of a poem by Hisashi Okuyama (publishing of a book) read by Michael Lonsdale and F. Thuries
  - Cheyne éditeur, Le Chambon-sur-Lignon
  - Galerie Art/Espace, Thonon-les-Bains
- 1997: Galerie Bruno Delarue, Étretat
- 1996:
  - Vers la blancheur, Galerie Jacob, Paris
  - Galerie Lise et Henri de Menthon, Paris
- 1995: Galerie Anne Bourdier, Rouen
- 1994:
  - Maison des Arts, Évreux
  - Galerie Anne Bourdier, Rouen
  - Galerie Lise et Henri de Menthon, Paris
- 1993: Maison des Arts, Conches
- 1992:
  - Galerie Anne Bourdier, Rouen
  - Galerie Lise et Henri de Menthon, Paris
- 1991: Centre d'art contemporain de Jouy-sur-Eure
- 1990:
  - Maison Mansart, Paris
  - Galerie C. Ehgner, Paris
- 1989:
  - Galerie du manoir, La Chaux-de-Fonds
  - Galerie J. Debaigts, Paris
- 1988:
  - Academia de Bellas Artes et Galerie Negre, Sabadell
  - Prieuré de Grandgourt
- 1987: Galerie Chapon, Bordeaux
- 1986: Exposition chez Paul Bigo, Les Andelys
- 1975: Galerie Frère, Le Havre
- 1974: Société Ricard, Rouen
- 1969: Theatre of Carcassonne

== Bibliography ==
- 2003: Bernard Chambaz, Jean-Pierre Schneider, La déposition, Le Temps qu'il fait
- 2008: Sabine Puget, Bernard Chambaz, Une chapelle à Château Barras. Francis Limérat, Jean-Pierre Schneider, Le Temps Qu'il Fait,
- 2011: Bernard Chambaz, Le vif du sujet, Le Temps qu'il fait
- 2014: Jean-Pierre Schneider, "Que lisez-vous?": "Les mots qui vont surgir", revue L'Atelier contemporain, n° 2
