= The Safety Matches =

Novel by Robert Sabatier

- First edition (French)
- Author: Robert Sabatier
- Original title: Les Allumettes suédoises
- Translator: Patsy Southgate
- Language: French
- Publisher: Albin Michel
- Publication date: 1969
- Publication place: France
- English publication date: 1972
- ISBN: 0-525-19595-5

The Safety Matches (French title: Les Allumettes suédoises), also translated under the title The Match Boy, is a novel by Robert Sabatier, published in 1969 by Albin Michel and translated into English by Patsy Southgate in 1972.

It is the first volume of an autobiographical series whose main character is a boy named Olivier.

An immediate best-seller, the book was adapted for French TV by Jacques Ertaud in 1995.
