= Robert Sabatier =

French poet and writer

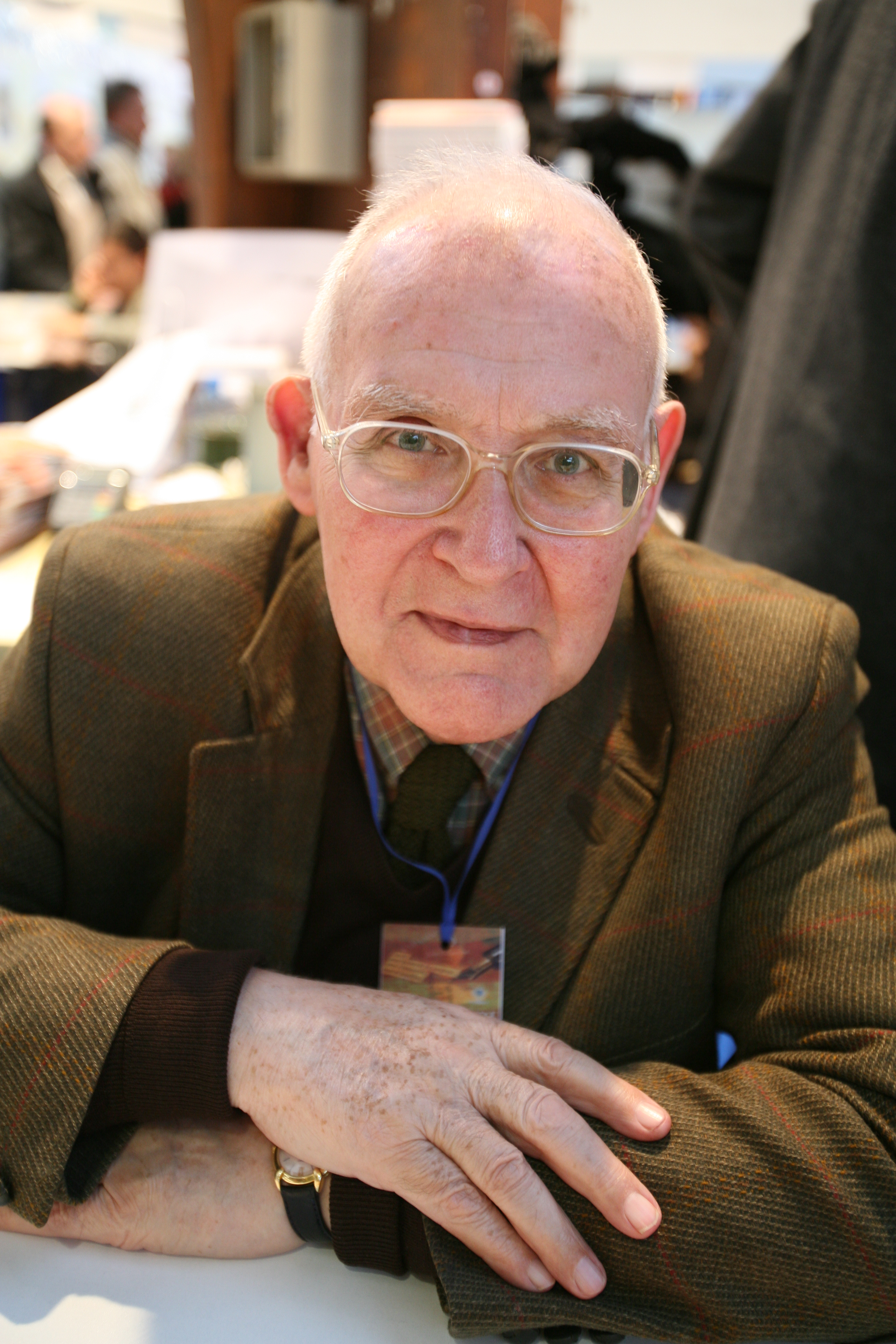
- Sabatier in 2006
- Born: 17 August 1923; Paris, France
- Died: 28 June 2012 (aged 88); Boulogne, France
- Occupations: Poet and writer
- Writing career
- Genres: Novels, poetry
- Notable works: "Les Allumettes Suédoises" (novel/memoir) "Vegetal Body" (poem) "Mortal Landscape" (poem)

Robert Sabatier (17 August 1923 – 28 June 2012) was a French poet and writer. He wrote numerous novels, essays and books of aphorisms and poems. He was elected to the Académie Goncourt in 1971, as well as to the Académie Mallarme. He is also the author of Histoire de la poésie française: La poésie du XVIIe siècle.

Among his notable works is the autobiographical series of novels "Roman d'Olivier" about growing up in the streets of a poor quarter in Paris during the 1930s. A title from the series, Les Allumettes Suédoises (The Safety Matches, also translated under the title The Match Boy), was adapted for French TV by Jacques Ertaud. According to Kirkus Reviews, the book Les Allumettes Suédoises sold 200,000 copies. Other autobiographical installments include "Olivier 1940" and "Les Trompettes Guerrières". More recent works include Diogène about the Cynic philosopher of ancient Greece.

As a poet, Sabatier was awarded Le Prix Guillaume Apollinaire in 1955. A small selection of Sabatier's poems have been published in English translations by the American poet X.J. Kennedy and others in the anthology Modern European Poetry (edited by Willis Barnstone et al., published by Bantam Books, NY, 1966). Kennedy's translations of Sabatier include the poems "Vegetal Body" and the elegiac "Mortal Landscape" where Sabatier wonders

The bird is flown, the monster not yet born
where shall we go in this demolished world?".

In an introduction to Sabatier, Barnstone states: "The poet's despair has sharp edges . . . but the bitter violence that strikes at the reader of these poems has its roots in an earlier joy that persists like a dream." Sabatier's poetry is deeply colored by memory and division: "He held the image that he loved so tight/his body itself cast two shadows."

Before his death, Sabatier was writing his memoirs.

== Novels ==
- Alain et le nègre (Éditions Albin Michel, 1953)
- Le marchand de sable (1954)
- Le goût de la cendre
- Boulevard
- Canard au sang
- La sainte farce
- La mort du figuier (Prix Richelieu 1963)
- Dessin sur un trottoir
- Le chinois d'Afrique
- Les années secrètes de la vie d'un homme (1984)
- Les enfants de l'été (1978)
- La Souris verte (1990)
- Le Cygne noir (1995)
- Le Lit de la Merveille (1997)
- Le Sourire aux lèvres (2000)
- Le Cordonnier de la rue triste (2009)
- Le roman d'Olivier:
  - Les Allumettes suédoises, Éditions Albin Michel, Paris (1969)
  - Trois sucettes à la menthe, Éditions Albin Michel, Paris (1972)
  - Les Noisettes sauvages (1974)
  - Les Fillettes chantantes (1980)
  - David et Olivier (1986)
  - Olivier et ses amis (1993)
  - Olivier 1940 (2003)
  - Les Trompettes guerrières (2007)
