= Michael West (playwright) =

Michael West (born Dublin, Ireland 1967) is a playwright and translator.

West has had a long association with The Corn Exchange Theatre Company, led by Annie Ryan, with whom he has created a number of original plays and adaptations.

== Productions ==
2020 The Fall of the Second Republic by Michael West in collaboration with Annie Ryan

2014 Conservatory by Michael West, directed by Michael Baker-Caven

2012 Dubliners by James Joyce, adapted by Michael West and Annie Ryan

2011 Man of Valour by Michael West, Annie Ryan and performer Paul Reid

2009 Freefall in collaboration with The Corn Exchange

2006 The Canterville Ghost adapted for The English National Ballet

2006 Everyday in collaboration with The Corn Exchange

2004 Dublin By Lamplight in collaboration with The Corn Exchange

2002 Lolita by Vladimir Nabokov, adapted by Michael West in collaboration with The Corn Exchange

2001 Forest Man in collaboration with Team Theatre Company

2001 Death And The Ploughman by Johannes von Saaz, translated by Michael West

2000 Foley

1999 Jack Fell Down in collaboration with Team Theatre Company

1999 The Seagull by Anton Chekhov, version by Michael West

1996 The Marriage of Figaro by Beaumarchais, translated by Michael West

1995 Sardines

1995 Monkey

1993 Snow

1992 Tartuffe by Molière, translated by Michael West

1992 The Tender Trap (La Double Inconstance) by Marivaux, translated by Michael West

1990 Dom Juan by Molière, translated by Michael West

1990 A Play On Two Chairs
