= Rougerie =

Rougerie is a French surname. Notable people with the surname include:

- Aurélien Rougerie (born 1980), French rugby union player
- Jacques Rougerie, French rugby union player
- Jacques Rougerie (architect) (born 1945), French architect and underwater habitat designer
- Michel Rougerie (1950–1981), French motorcycle racer
