= Colette Nys-Mazure =

Belgian author writing in French (born 1939)

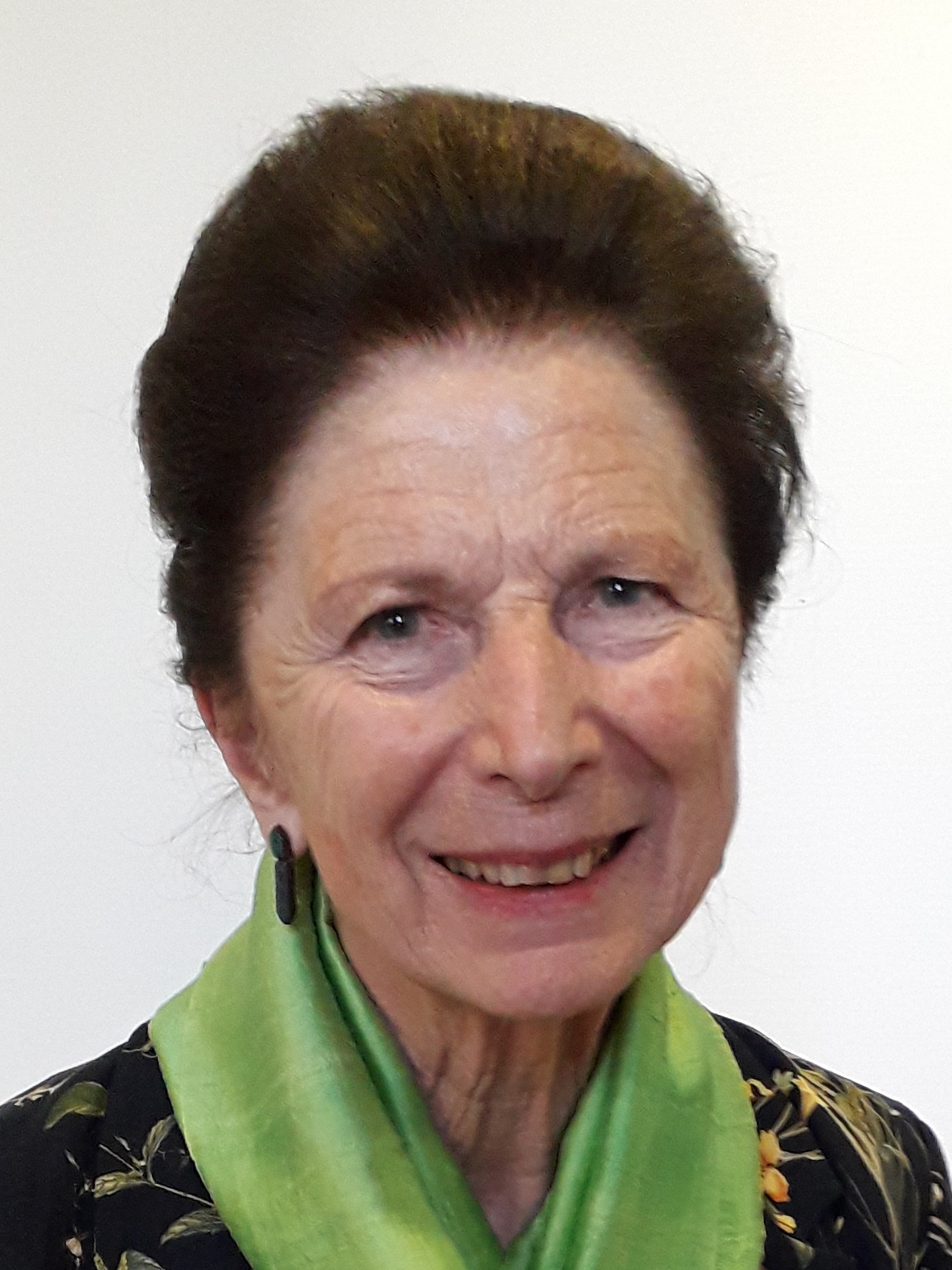
Colette Nys-Mazure in 2019

Colette Nys-Mazure (born 14 May 1939) is a Belgian poet, essayist, playwright, and novelist writing in French.

She was born in Wavre. She received a master's degree in modern literature from the Catholic University of Leuven. From 1961 to 1999, she taught French literature.

Following the death of her parents, she moved to Tournai.

She also writes books for young people and essays. Her work has been translated into English, German, Polish, Italian, Japanese, Dutch, Czech, Swedish and other languages.

== Selected works ==
- La vie à foison, poetry (1975)
- D'amour et de cendre, poetry (1977)
- Pénétrance, poetry (1981), received the Prix Charles Plisnier
- Haute enfance, poetry (1990), received the Grand Prix de Poésie pour la Jeunesse awarded by the French Ministry of National Education, Youth and Sports
- Singulières et plurielles, poetry (1992)
- Tous locataires, play (1993) with Françoise Lison-Leroy
- La Criée d'aube, poetry (1995)
- Le For intérieur, poetry (1996), received the Prix Max-Pol Fouchet de Poésie
- Contes d’espérance, short stories (1998)
- Dix minutes pour écrire, play (2002)
- Seuils de Loire, poetry (2003)
- Sans y toucher, short stories (2004), received the Prix Maurice et Gisèle Gauchez-Philippot
- Perdre pied, novel (2008)
