= Alain Bancquart =

French composer (1934–2022)

- Born: 20 June 1934; Dieppe, France
- Died: 27 January 2022 (aged 87)
- Education: Conservatoire de Paris
- Occupation: Composer
- Spouse: Marie-Claire Bancquart

Alain Bancquart (20 June 1934 – 27 January 2022) was a French composer.

== Biography ==
Bancquart had his musical formation at the Conservatoire de Paris (violin, viola, chamber music, counterpoint, fugue and composition) with Darius Milhaud. He was a violist with the Orchestre National de France until 1973. He became Directeur Musical des Orchestres de Régions at the ORTF (1973–1974), then musical director of the Orchestre National de France (1975–1976).

Since 1967, he had dedicated his compositional work to the study of micro-intervals in a neo-serial approach using quarter-tones, and more recently 16th tones.

Bancquart was married to French poet Marie-Claire Bancquart. He died on 27 January 2022, at the age of 87.

== Selected works ==
- Five symphonies for large orchestra
- Two concertos for violin
- Partition concertante for cello and ensemble
- Two works for string trio and orchestra
- Two chamber operas
- Three string quartets
- Many pieces for flute
- Many vocal works
- Baroques for viola and orchestra (1973)
- Concerto for viola and orchestra (1965)
- Jeux pour lumière for violin, viola, cello and orchestra (1969)
- Les Tarots d'Ulysse for soprano, tenor and baritone soloists, violin, viola and flute solo, children's chorus, percussion, synthesizers and tape (1984)
- Ma manière d'arbre II: Du lent sommeil des feuilles for viola and 10 instruments (1992)
- Écorces I for violin and viola (published 1968)
- Sonata for viola solo (1983)
- Duo for viola and harp (1985)
