= Angela Marinescu =

Romanian poet (1940–2023)

Angela Marinescu (born Basaraba-Angela Marcovici; 8 July 1941 – 3 November 2023) was a Romanian poet.

== Biography ==
Her works include Cocoșul s-a ascuns în tăietură (1996), Fugi postmoderne (2000), Îmi mănânc versurile (2003), Limbajul dispariției (2006), and Întâmplări derizorii de sfârșit (2006).

Her essays include Satul în care mă plimbam rasă în cap (1996) and the journal Jurnal scris în a treia parte a zilei (2004).

In September 2006 she was awarded the "Premiul Național de Poezie".

Marinescu died on 3 November 2023, at the age of 82.
