= Pierre Dalle Nogare =

French poet, novelist and playwright

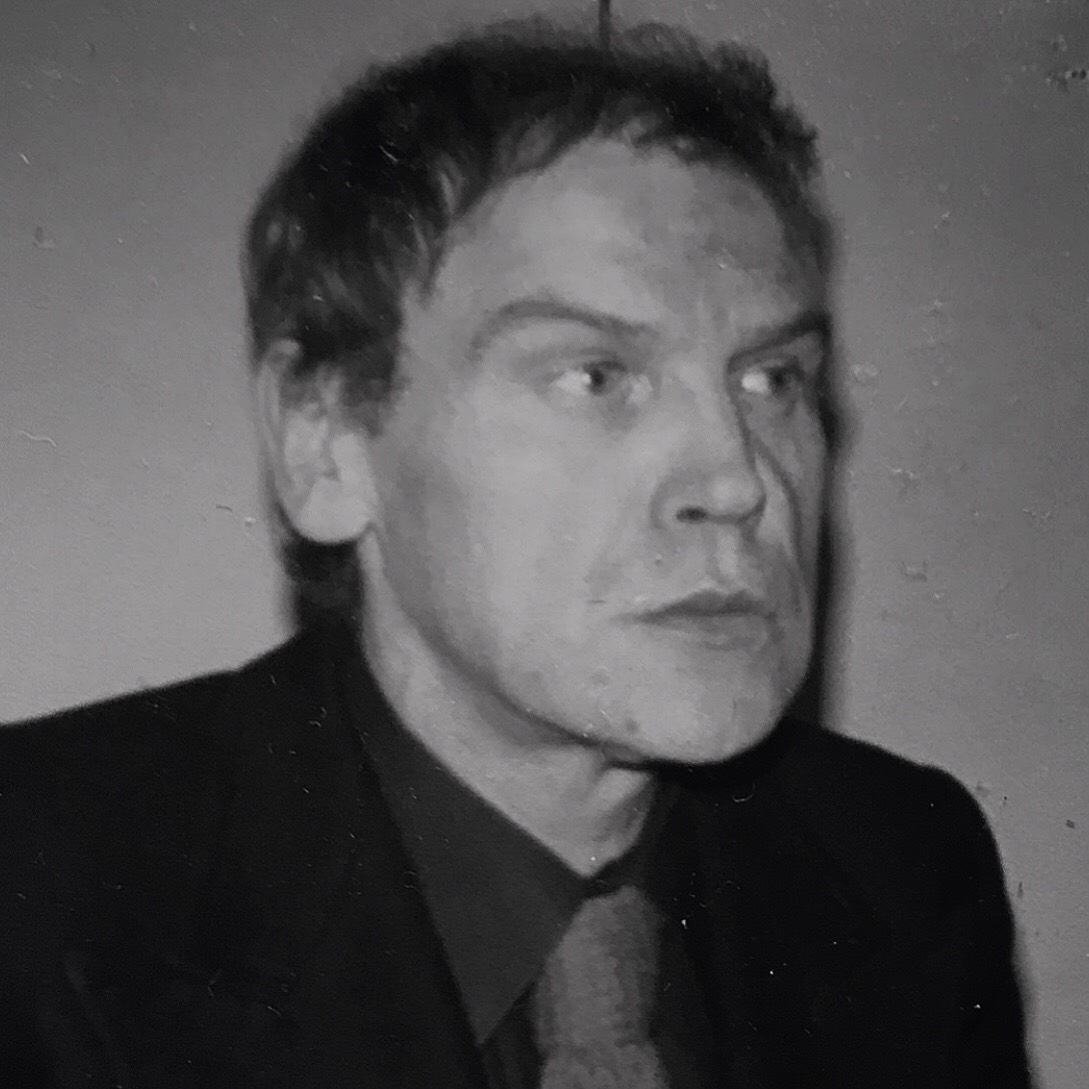
Pierre Dalle Nogare

Pierre Dalle Nogare (22 December 1934, in Paris – 1984) was a French poet, novelist and playwright. In 1970, he was awarded the Prix Guillaume-Apollinaire for Corps imaginaire published by Flammarion.

== Work ==
=== Collection of poems ===
- 1957: Cellules, Gallimard
- 1962: L'autre hier, Gallimard
- 1967: Hauts-fonds, Flammarion
- 1969: Corps imaginaire, Flammarion
- 1970: Motrice, Éditions Fata Morgana

=== Narrations ===
- 1971: La Mort assise
- 1972: Déméter

=== Novel ===
- 1974: Le Grand temps, Éditions Julliard

=== Play ===
- 1958: Les Gusm

=== Adaptation ===
He is also the author of an adaptation in "modern French" of Tristan and Iseult, with a preface by Alain Bosquet and illustrated with ten original engravings on copper by Lars Bo, Gisèle Celan-Lestrange, Gérard Diaz, Donatella, Gérard Trignac et alii (Paris, Club du livre, 1985)
