= Aksinia Mihaylova =

Bulgarian translator, editor and poet (born 1963)

Aksinia Mihaylova (Bulgarian: Аксиния Михайлова) (born April 13, 1963) is a Bulgarian translator, editor and poet. Her first name also appears as Askinia.

She was born in Rakevo village, northwest Bulgaria and was educated at a Lycée français in Vratsa, at the State Institute of Library Studies in Sofia and at the Slavic philology department of Sofia University, St. Kliment Ohridski. She worked for two years at the regional library in Shumen. In 1990, she helped found the first independent literary journal in Bulgaria Ah, Maria and continued on as part of its editorial team. From 1994 to 1998, she worked for the Paradox publishing house. As of early 2015, she was living in Sofia.

Mihaylova has translated more than 30 books into Bulgarian, both poetry and prose, by authors such as Georges Bataille, Jean Genet, Vénus Khoury-Ghata, Sylvie Germain and Alexis Jenni; she has also published anthologies of Lithuanian and Latvian poetry. She has published five books of her own poems in Bulgarian and her poems have been published in translation in 13 European languages, as well as in Turkish, Arabic, Chinese and Japanese.

Her book Ciel à Perdre, written in French, received the Prix Guillaume Apollinaire in 2014.

She is a member of the Bulgarian chapter of PEN International, of the Association of Bulgarian writers and of the Union of Bulgarian translators.
