= Lorand Gaspar =

Hungarian-born French poet (1925–2019)

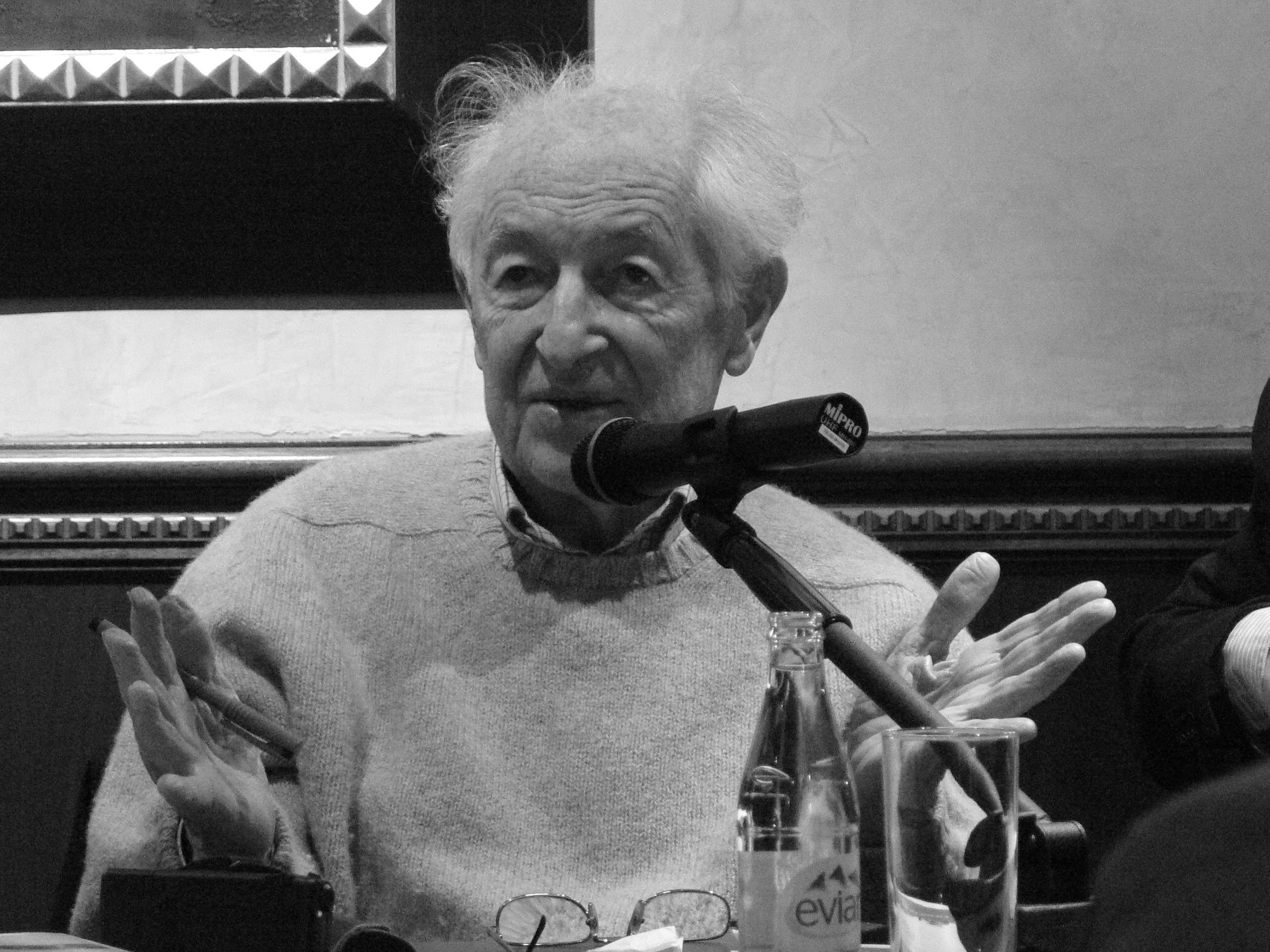
Lorand Gaspar

Lorand Gaspar (28 February 1925, in Târgu Mureș – 9 October 2019, in Paris) was a Hungarian–born French poet.

== Life ==
Gaspar was born in February 1925 in Târgu Mureș, Romania. In 1943, he enrolled at Palatine Joseph University of Technology and Economics (today: Budapest University of Technology and Economics) in Engineering, was mobilized months later, and then imprisoned in a labor camp. He escaped in March 1945, and surrendered to the French in Pfullendorf.

He moved to France, where he studied medicine, becoming later a surgeon in France, then in Jerusalem, where he lived for sixteen years, and in Bethlehem and Tunis. He lived in Paris, where he was involved in medical research dealing with human psychology.

He published his first verse collection in 1966, Le Quatrième État de la matière (Flammarion) and published a number of prose works and travel books as a photographer.

He mastered several languages: to the languages learned as a child, Hungarian, Romanian and German, and later French, English, Latin, Greek and Arabic. He translated (in collaboration with Sarah Clair), Spinoza, Rilke, Seferis, D. H. Lawrence, Peter Riley, and Pilinsky.

Gaspar died in Paris in October 2019 at the age of 94.

== Awards ==
- 1998 Prix Goncourt de la Poésie

== Works ==
=== English Translations ===
- "from Nuits: An evening in front of the fireplace at Saint Rémy du Val", Jacket 14, translated by Peter Riley, July 2001
- Mary Ann Caws, ed. (2004). "Lorand Gaspar". Yale anthology of 20th-century French poetry. Yale University Press. ISBN 978-0-300-10010-5.
- Earth Absolute & Other Texts, translated by Mary Ann Caws and Nancy Kline, New York: Contra Mundum Press, 2015.
- "Leaving Sidi Bou Said",The Fortnightly Review - New Series, translated by Amine Mouaffak and Sahar Taghdisi Rad, January 2019

=== French Language Works ===
- Le Quatrième État de la matière Paris: Flammarion, 1966. Prix Apollinaire, 1967.
- Gisements Paris: Flammarion, 1968.
- Histoire de la Palestine Paris : Maspero, 1968 et 1978.
- Palestine, année zéro Paris : Maspero, 1970.
- Sol absolu, Paris : Gallimard, 1972.
  - Sol absolu. Translated by Jalāl Ḥakmāwī. Marsam Editions. 2006. ISBN 978-9954-21-066-6.
- Approche de la parole, Paris, Gallimard, 1978.
- Corps corrosifs, Fata Morgana, 1978.
- Egée suivi de Judée, Paris, Gallimard, 1980.
- Sol absolu, Corps corrosifs et autres textes, avec un essai d'autobiographie. Paris: Gallimard. 1982.
- Feuilles d'observation. Paris : Gallimard, 1986.
- Carnets de Patmos. Cognac : Le Temps qu'il fait, 1991.
- Égée, Judée, suivi d’extraits de Feuilles d’observation et de La maison près de la mer. Paris : Gallimard, 1993.
- Apprentissage. Paris : Deyrolle, 1994.
- Carnets de Jérusalem, Cognac, Le temps qu'il fait, 1997.
- Patmos et autres poèmes. Paris : Gallimard, 2001.
- Derrière le dos de Dieu. Paris : Gallimard, 2010.
