= Marie-Claire Bancquart =

French poet, novelist, and literary critic (1932–2019)

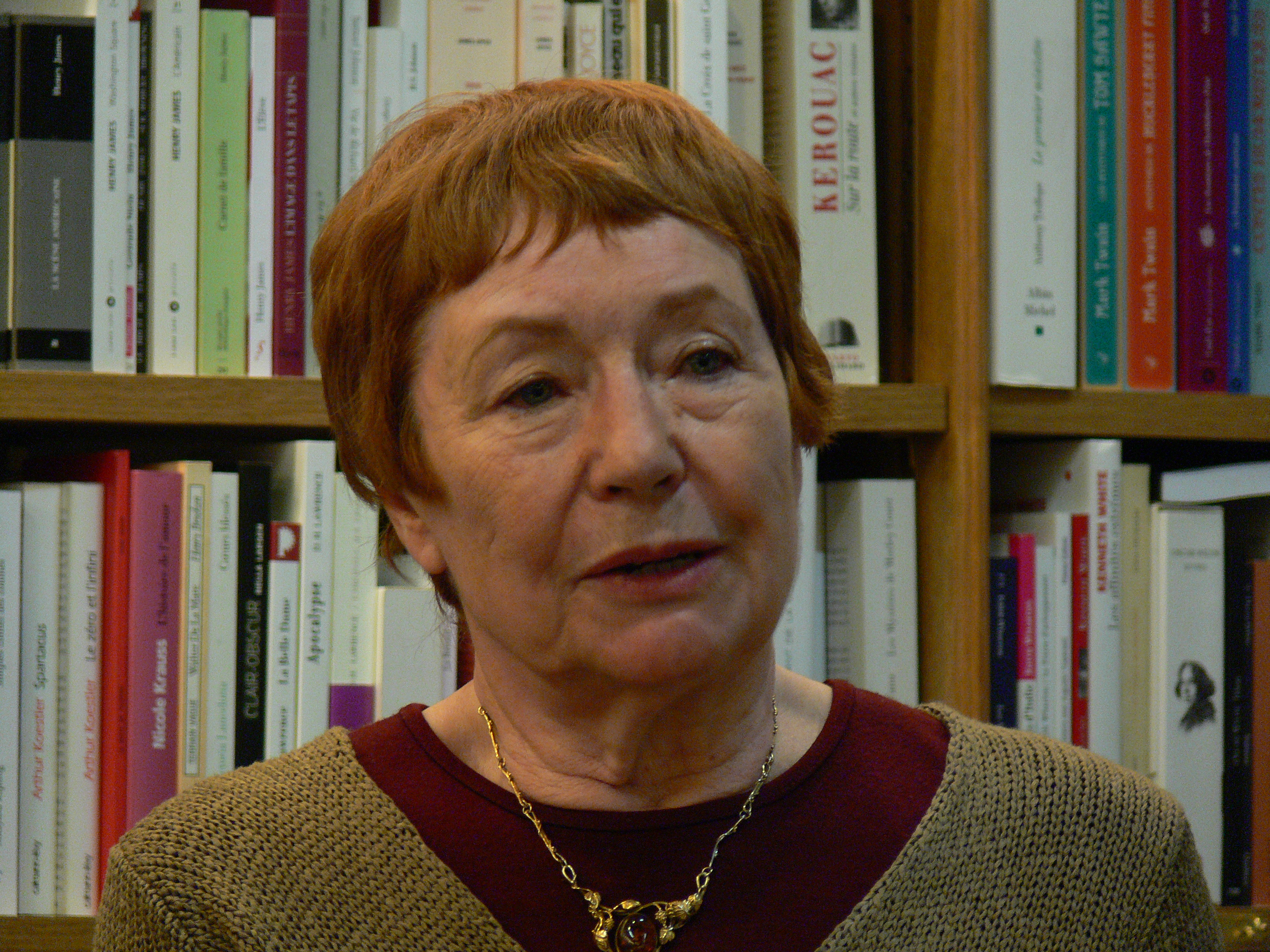
- Bancquart at a bookstore in Paris.
- Born: 21 July 1932; Aveyron, France
- Died: 19 February 2019 (aged 86)
- Occupations: Poet, professor, essayist, critic
- Spouse: Alain Bancquart
- Writing career
- Language: French
- Genre: Poetry
- Website: mapage.noos.fr/marieclairebancquart

Marie-Claire Bancquart (21 July 1932 – 19 February 2019) was a French poet, essayist, professor emerita and literary critic. She was the recipient of the Grand prix de la Critique littéraire of the Académie Française, the premier authority on matters related to French language and culture, as well as numerous other awards. Her poetry is known for its visceral nature, often exploring the interior of the human body as a means of exploring emotion and humanity.

Bancquart was president of the French arts council La Maison de la Poésie, and a professor emerita of the Université Paris-Sorbonne. Bancquart has been described as one of the most "powerful" voices in contemporary French poetry, drawing comparisons to French poet Charles Baudelaire. In addition to her many volumes of poetry, Bancquart has also published books and essays on subjects such as surrealism and Anatole France.

She was married to French composer Alain Bancquart.

== Published works ==
Poetry

- Mais, Vodaine, 1969
- Projets alternés, Rougerie, 1972
- Mains dissoutes, Rougerie, 1975
- Cherche-terre, Saint-Germain des prés, 1977
- Mémoire d'abolie, Belfond 1978
- Habiter le sel, Pierre Dalle Nogare, 1979
- Partition, Belfond, 1981
- Votre visage jusqu'à l'os, Temps Actuels, 1983
- Opportunité des oiseaux, Belfond, 1986
- Opéra des limites, José Corti, 1988
- Végétales, Les cahiers du Confluent, 1988
- Sans lieu sinon l'attente, Obsidiane, 1991
- Dans le feuilletage de la terre, Belfond, 1994
- Énigmatiques, Obsidiane, 1995
- La Vie, lieu-dit, Obsidiane en coédition avec Noroît (Canada), 1997
- La Paix saignée, précédée de Contrées du corps natal, Obsidiane, 1999
- Voilé/dévoilé, éditions Trait d'Union, Montréal, 2000
- Avec la mort, quartier d'orange entre les dents, Obsidiane, 2005
- Verticale du secret, Amourier, 2007
- Terre énergumène, Le Castor Astral, 2009
- Explorer l'incertain, Amourier, 2010
- Violente vie, Le Castor Astral, 2012

Novels

- L'Inquisiteur, Belfond, 1980
- Les Tarots d'Ulysse, Belfond, 1984
- Photos de famille, François Bourin, 1988
- Elise en automne, François Bourin, 1991
- La Saveur du sel, Bourin / Julliard, 1994
- Une femme sans modèles, éditions de Fallois, 1999

Essays

- Paris des surréalistes, Seguers, 1973
- Maupassant conteur fantastique, Minard, 1976, rééd. 1993
- Anatole France, un sceptique passionné, Calmann-Lévy, 1984
- Images littéraires de Paris fin de siècle, la Différence, 1979
- Poésie française 1945-1970 (sous la dir.), PUF 1995
- Fin de siècle gourmande, 1880-1900, PUF, 2001
- Écrivains fin-de-siècle, Gallimard, 2010
