= Camille Rowe =

French-American model

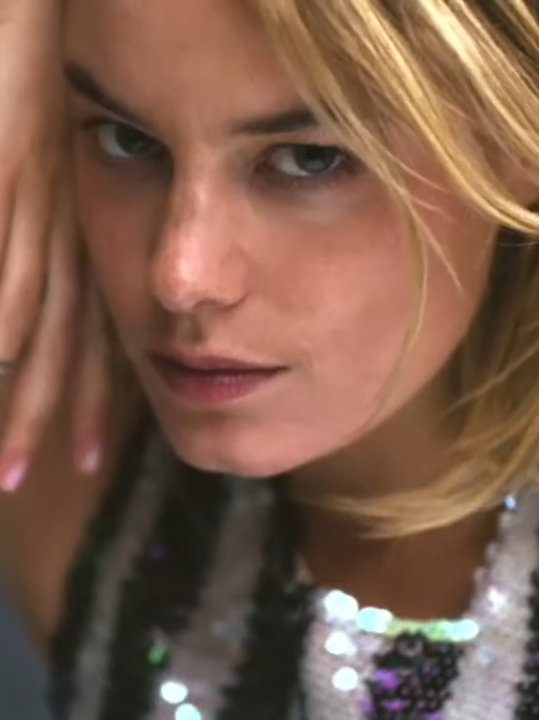
- Rowe, 2017
- Born: Camille Chrystal Pourcheresse; Paris, France
- Citizenship: French and American
- Occupation: Model
- Years active: 2008–present
- Partner: Theo Niarchos (2018–present)
- Modeling information
- Hair color: Dark blonde
- Eye color: Blue-green
- Agency: The Society Management (New York); The Lab (Milan); View Management (Barcelona); Modelwerk (Hamburg); Be Model Management (Brussels); Unique Models (Copenhagen); MIKAs (Stockholm); Stage Tokyo Model Agency (Tokyo); Girl (Paris) (mother agency)

Camille Chrystal Pourcheresse, known professionally as Camille Rowe, is a French-American model and actress.

== Early life ==
Rowe was born in Paris, France, to an American mother, who was a model and dancer at Le Lido club, and a French father, a restaurateur. Rowe was raised in the suburbs of Ville-d'Avray, Paris. Her childhood was split between France, New York City and California.

== Modeling career ==
Rowe was spotted in 2008 at a café in Le Marais, Paris, while studying at university, and became the face of Chloé. She has appeared in magazines such as Vogue Paris, Marie Claire Italia, Madame Figaro, Vogue Italia, Vogue España, and Elle France. She has also modeled for Louis Vuitton, Opening Ceremony, Gap Inc., Abercrombie & Fitch, Tommy Hilfiger, Seafolly, Rag & Bone, H&M, Tory Burch, Ralph Lauren, and Adidas Originals. In 2016, Rowe appeared on the cover of Playboy and walked for the Victoria's Secret Fashion Show.

== Personal life ==
Rowe was in a relationship with Harry Styles from 2017 to 2018. She inspired his 2019 album Fine Line.

Since summer 2018, she is in a relationship with Theo Niarchos, an art dealer, son of art collector Philip Niarchos and grandson of Greek shipping billionaire Stavros Niarchos.

== Filmography ==
=== Film ===
Year	Title	Director	Role	Notes
2010	Our Day Will Come	Romain Gavras	The English lady	French: Notre jour viendra.
2016	L'Idéal	Frédéric Beigbeder	Monica Pynchon	
2017	Rock'n Roll	Guillaume Canet	herself	
2019	I Wish Someone Were Waiting for Me Somewhere	Arnaud Viard	Margaux	Adapted screenplay from Anna Gavalda's homonymous collection of short stories
2019	Hosea	Ryan Daniel Dobson	Cate	
2019	Where Are You	Valentina De Amicis and Riccardo Spinotti	Matilda	
2020	Knuckledust	James Kermack	Serena	
2021	The Deep House	Alexandre Bustillo and Julien Maury	Tina	
2022	No Limit	David M. Rosenthal	Roxanna	
2023	Pet Shop Days	Olmo Schnabel	Andy	
2023	Night of the Hunted	Franck Khalfoun	Alice German Burke	
2025	Un mariage sans fin	Patrick Cassir	Louna	

=== Music videos ===
Year	Title	Director	Musicians	Notes
2011	Call Me Back	Albert Hammond Jr	The Strokes	More than 5.5 million views as of August 2021.
2013	Alien Days	Sam Fleischner and Megha Barnabas	MGMT	More than 4 million views as of August 2021. Columbia Records, Division of Sony Music Entertainment.
2021	The Weeknd - Can't Feel My Face (Alternate Video)	–	The Weeknd	More than 1 million views as of September 2021.

Amberleigh West	Kristy Garett	Dree Hemingway	Camille Rowe	Brook Power	Josie Canseco
Ali Michael	Valerie van der Graaf	Kelly Gale	Allie Silva	Ashley Smith	Enikő Mihalik
