= Prix France Télévisions =

French literary awards

The Prix France Télévisions are annual literary awards in France. Since 1995, the national television broadcaster France Télévisions has awarded two prizes, for a novel and an essay. The judging panel consists of 15 television viewers chosen from across France, on the basis of their cover letters.

== Winners of the France Télévisions novel prize ==
- 1995: Florence Seyvos, Les Apparitions (Éditions de l'Olivier)
- 1996: Jean-Paul Dubois, Kennedy et moi (Seuil)
- 1997: Louis Gardel, L'Aurore des bien-aimés (Seuil)
- 1998: Paule Constant, Confidence pour confidence (Gallimard)
- 1999: Michèle Desbordes, La Demande (Éditions Verdier)
- 2000: Dominique Jamet, Un petit Parisien 1941-1945 (Flammarion)
- 2000: Philippe Claudel, J'abandonne (Éditions Balland)
- 2001: François Vallejo, Madame Angeloso (Éditions Viviane Hamy)
- 2002: Jean-Pierre Milovanoff, La Mélancolie des innocents (Grasset)
- 2003: Serge Joncour, U.V. (Le Dilettante)
- 2004: Éric Fottorino, Korsakov ([Gallimard)
- 2005: Franck Pavloff, Le Pont de Ran-Mositar (Albin Michel)
- 2006: Nancy Huston, Lignes de faille (Actes Sud)
- 2007: Olivier Adam, À l'abri de rien (L'Olivier)
- 2008: Yasmina Khadra, Ce que le jour doit à la nuit (Julliard)
- 2009: Véronique Ovaldé, Ce que je sais de Vera Candida (L'Olivier)
- 2010: Jérôme Ferrari, Où j'ai laissé mon âme (Actes Sud)
- 2011: Delphine de Vigan, Rien ne s'oppose à la nuit (JC Lattès)
- 2012: Antoine Choplin, La Nuit tombée (Éditions La fosse aux ours)
- 2013: Pierre Lemaitre, Au revoir là-haut (Albin Michel)
- 2014: Éric Reinhardt, L'Amour et les Forêts (Gallimard)
- 2016: Olivier Bourdeaut, En attendant Bojangles (Éditions Finitude)
- 2017: Nathacha Appanah, Tropique de la violence (Gallimard)
- 2018: Michel Bernard, Le Bon Cœur (La Table ronde)
- 2019: Ali Zamir, Dérangé que je suis (Le Tripode)
- 2020: Amanda Sthers, Lettre d'amour sans le dire (Grasset)

== Winners of the France Télévisions essay prize ==
- 1995: Mona Ozouf, Les Mots des femmes (Fayard)
- 1996: Olivier Todd, Albert Camus, une vie (Gallimard)
- 1997: Antoine de Baecque, Serge Toubiana, François Truffaut (Gallimard)
- 1998: Xavier Darcos, Mérimée (Flammarion)
- 1999: Michel Baridon, Les Jardins : Paysagistes, jardiniers, poètes (Robert Laffont)
- 2000: Dominique Jamet, Un petit parisien, 1941-1945 (Flammarion)
- 2001: Roger-Pol Droit, 101 expériences de philosophie quotidienne (Éditions Odile Jacob)
- 2002: Patrick Declerck, Les Naufragés (Plon)
- 2003: Jérôme Garcin, Théâtre intime (Gallimard)
- 2004: Stephen Smith, Négrologie : pourquoi l'Afrique meurt (Calmann-Lévy)
- 2005: Jean-Pierre Vernant, La Traversée des frontières (Seuil)
- 2006: Hubert Prolongeau, Victoire sur l'excision : Pierre Foldes, le chirurgien qui redonne l'espoir aux femmes mutilées (Albin Michel)
- 2007: Alain Bentolila, Le Verbe contre la barbarie : Apprendre à nos enfants à vivre ensemble (Odile Jacob)
- 2008: Wassyla Tamzali, Une éducation algérienne : De la révolution à la décennie noire (Gallimard)
- 2009: Dominique Fernandez, Ramon (Grasset)
- 2010: Guillaume de Fonclare, Dans ma peau (Stock)
- 2011: Michel Pastoureau, Les Couleurs de nos souvenirs (Seuil)
- 2012: Rithy Panh, L’Élimination (Grasset)
- 2013: Nicolas Werth La Route de la Kolyma (Éditions Belin)
- 2014: Gilles Lapouge L’Âne et l’Abeille (Albin Michel)
- 2015: Emmanuel de Waresquiel Fouché, les silences de la pieuvre (Editions Fayard)
- 2016: Mathias Malzieu Journal d'un vampire en pyjama (Albin Michel)
- 2017: Patrizia Paterlini-Bréchot, Tuer le cancer (Stock)
- 2018: Ivan Jablonka, En camping-car (Seuil)
- 2019: Valérie Zenatti, Dans le faisceau des vivants (L'Olivier)
- 2020: François Durpaire, Histoire mondiale du bonheur (Le Cherche midi)
