= Prix des libraires =

The Prix des libraires (Booksellers award) is a French literary award that is given to the author of a novel written in French. The award is organized since 1955 by the Fédération Française Syndicale de la librairie (FFSL). Approximately 5000 booksellers from France, Belgium, Switzerland and Canada cast a vote.

== Award winners ==
Year		Author	Title	Publisher (x times)	Note
1955		Michel de Saint Pierre	Les Aristocrates	La Table ronde	Also Grand prix du roman de l'Académie française
1956	nothumb	Albert Vidalie	La Bonne Ferte	Denoël	
1957	nothumb	Françoise Mallet-Joris	Les Mensonges	Julliard	First foreign and Belgian laureate
1958		Jean Bassan	Nul ne s'évade	Plon	
1959		Georges Bordonove	Deux cents chevaux dorés	Julliard (2)	
1960	nothumb	Georges Conchon	La Corrida de la victoire	Albin Michel	
1961	nothumb	Andrée Martinerie	Les Autres Jours	Gallimard	
1962	nothumb	Jean Anglade	La Foi et la Montagne	Éditions Robert Laffont	
1963	nothumb	José Cabanis	Les Cartes du temps	Gallimard (2)	
1964		Pierre Moinot	Le Sable vif	Gallimard (3)	
1965		Jacques Peuchmaurd	Le Soleil de Palicorna	Robert Laffont (2)	
1966		Jacques Perry	Vie d'un païen	Robert Laffont (3)	
1967	nothumb	Catherine Paysan	Les Feux de la Chandeleur	Éditions Denoël (2)	
1968		Paul Guimard	`Les Choses de la vie	Denoël (3)	
1969		René Barjavel	La Nuit des temps	Presses de la Cité	
1970	nothumb	Georges-Emmanuel Clancier	L'Éternité plus un jour	Robert Laffont (4)	
1971		Anne Hébert	Kamouraska	Seuil	First Canadian laureate
1972	nothumb	Didier Decoin	Abraham de Brooklyn	Seuil (2)	
1973		Michel Del Castillo	Le Vent de la nuit	Julliard (3)	Also prix des Deux Magots
1974		Michèle Perrein	Le Buveur de Garonne	Flammarion	
1975		Herbert Le Porrier	Le Médecin de Cordoue	Seuil (3)	
1976	nothumb	Patrick Modiano	Villa triste	Gallimard (4)	
1977		Pierre Moustiers	Un crime de notre temps	Seuil (4)	
1978		Jean Noli	La Grâce de Dieu	Julliard (4)	
1979		Christiane Singer	La Mort viennoise	Albin Michel (2)	
1980	notumb	Claude Michelet	Des grives aux loups	Robert Laffont (5)	
1981		Claude Brami	Le Garçon sur la colline	Denoël (4)	
1982		Serge Lentz	Les Années-sandwiches	Robert Laffont (6)	
1983		Serge Bramly	La Danse du loup	Belfond	
1984		Guy Lagorce	Le Train du soir	Grasset	
1985		Christian Dedet	La Mémoire du fleuve	Éditions Phébus	
1986		Robert Mallet	Ellynn	Gallimard (5)	
1987		Jacques Almira	La Fuite à Constantinople	Mercure de France	
1988	nothumb	Yves Simon	Le Voyageur magnifique	Grasset (2)	
1989	nothumb	Michel Chaillou	La Croyance des voleurs	Seuil (5)	
1990		Claude Duneton	Rires d'homme entre deux pluies	Grasset (3)	
1991		Michelle Schuller	Une femme qui ne disait rien	Presses de la Renaissance	
1992		Ève de Castro	Ayez pitié du cœur des hommes	JC Lattès	
1993		Françoise Xenakis	Attends-moi	Grasset (4)	
1994		Isabelle Hausser	Nitchevo	Éditions de Fallois	
1995	nothumb	Anne Cuneo	Le Trajet d'une rivière	Denoël (5)	First Swiss laureate
1996	nothumb	Gilbert Sinoué	Le Livre de saphir	Denoël (6)	
1997	nothumb	Philippe Delerm	Sundborn ou les Jours de lumière	Éditions du Rocher	
1998	nothumb	Jean-Guy Soumy	La Belle Rochelaise	Robert Laffont (7)	
1999	nothumb	Marc Dugain	La Chambre des officiers	JC Lattès (2)	Also prix des Deux Magots
2000	nothumb	Jean-Pierre Milovanoff	L'Offrande sauvage	Grasset (5)	
2001	nothumb	Pierre Assouline	Double Vie	Gallimard (6)	
2002	nothumb	Fred Vargas	Pars vite et reviens tard	Éditions Viviane Hamy	
2003	nothumb	Laurent Gaudé	La Mort du roi Tsongor	Actes Sud	Also prix Goncourt des lycéens
2004		François Vallejo	Groom	Viviane Hamy (2)	
2005	nothumb	Éric Fottorino	Korsakov	Gallimard (7)	
2006	nothumb	Yasmina Khadra	L'Attentat	Julliard (5)	First Algerian laureate
2007	nothumb	Muriel Barbery	L'Élégance du hérisson	Gallimard (8)	
2008	nothumb	Delphine de Vigan	No et moi	JC Lattès (3)	
2009		Dominique Mainard	Pour vous	Joëlle Losfeld	
2010	nothumb	Laurent Mauvignier	Des hommes	Éditions de Minuit	Also prix Virilo
2011	nothumb	Victor Cohen Hadria	Les Trois Saisons de la rage	Albin Michel (3)	Also prix du premier roman
2012		Virginie Deloffre	Léna	Albin Michel (4)	
2013		Yannick Grannec	La Déesse des petites victoires	Éditions Anne Carrière	
2014	nothumb	Valentine Goby	Kinderzimmer	Actes Sud (2)	
2015		Léonor de Récondo	Amours	Sabine Wespieser	Also Grand prix RTL-Lire
2016		Thomas B. Reverdy	Il était une ville	Flammarion (2)	
2017		Cécile Coulon	Trois Saisons d'orage	Viviane Hamy (3)	
2018		Gaëlle Nohant	Légende d'un dormeur éveillé	Héloïse d'Ormesson	
2019		Franck Bouysse	Né d'aucune femme	La Manufacture de livres	
2020		Akira Mizubayashi	Âme brisée	Gallimard (9)	
2021		Miguel Bonnefoy	Héritage	Rivages	
2022		Marie Vingtras	Blizzard	Éditions de l'Olivier	
2023		Gilles Marchand	Le Soldat désaccordé	Aux Forges de Vulcain	
2024		Éric Chacour	Ce que je sais de toi	Éditions Alto	AlsoPrix Femina des lycéens
2025		Bérénice Pichat	La Petite Bonne	Les Avrils	
