= Prix France Culture/Télérama =

French literary prize

The Prix France Culture/Télérama is a literary prize created in 2006 by the French radio station France Culture and the French magazine Télérama in order to honor an outstanding book at the start of the calendar year, which differentiates it from other famous French literary prizes such as the Prix Goncourt or the Prix Femina, which reward books appearing at the beginning of the academic year in September.

This award goes to a work of fiction written in French and published in January or February. The president of the jury presents the author with a sum of €5,000 at the Salon Livre Paris.

== Winners ==
Year	Author	Title	Publisher (x times)	Notes
2006	François Bégaudeau	Entre les murs	Éditions Verticales	
2007	Régis Jauffret	Microfictions	Gallimard	
2008	Véronique Ovaldé	Et mon cœur transparent	éditions de l'Olivier	
2009	Antoine Bello	Les Éclaireurs	Gallimard	
2010	Élisabeth Filhol	La Centrale	éditions P.O.L	
2011	Nicolas Fargues	Tu verras	éditions P.O.L	
2012	Alain-Julien Rudefoucauld	Le Dernier Contingent	éditions Tristram	
2013	Frédéric Roux	Alias Ali	éditions Fayard	
2014	Maylis de Kerangal	Réparer les vivants	Éditions Verticales	
2015	Éric Reinhardt	L'Amour et les Forêts	Gallimard	
2016 (march)	Olivier Bourdeaut	En attendant Bojangles	éditions Finitude	
2016 (december)	Gaël Faye	Petit pays	éditions Grasset	
2017	Léonor de Récondo	Point cardinal	Sabine Wespieser éditeur	
2018	Pauline Delabroy-Allard	Ça raconte Sarah	Les Éditions de Minuit	
2019	Emma Becker	La Maison	éditions Flammarion	
2020	Lola Lafon	Chavirer	Actes Sud	
2021	Mathieu Palain	Ne t'arrête pas de courir	L'Iconoclaste	
2022	Kaouther Adimi	Au vent mauvais	Seuil	
2023	Salma El Moumni	Adieu Tanger	Grasset	
2024	Gabriella Zalapì	lIaria ou la conquête de la désobéissance	éditions Zoé	
2025	Séphora Pondi	Avale	Grasset	
