= Just the Two of Us (2023 film) =

2023 psychological drama film

- Theatrical release poster
- French: L'Amour et les Forêts
- Literally: Love and the Forests
- Directed by: Valérie Donzelli
- Screenplay by: Valérie Donzelli; Audrey Diwan
- Based on: L'Amour et les Forêts by Éric Reinhardt
- Produced by: Édouard Weil; Alice Girard
- Starring: Virginie Efira; Melvil Poupaud
- Cinematography: Laurent Tangy
- Edited by: Pauline Gaillard
- Music by: Gabriel Yared
- Production companies: Rectangle Productions; France 2 Cinéma; Les Films de Françoise
- Distributed by: Diaphana Distribution
- Release dates: 24 May 2023 (Cannes); 24 May 2023 (France)
- Running time: 105 minutes
- Country: France
- Language: French
- Box office: $5.2 million

Just the Two of Us (French: L'Amour et les Forêts, lit. 'Love and the Forests') is a 2023 French psychological drama film directed by Valérie Donzelli, from a screenplay written by Donzelli and Audrey Diwan. It is based on Éric Reinhardt's 2014 novel L'Amour et les Forêts.

It had its world premiere in the Cannes Premiere section at the 76th Cannes Film Festival on 24 May 2023, being theatrically released in France on the same day by Diaphana Distribution. It received four nominations at the 49th César Awards.

== Synopsis ==
Blanche falls in love with Grégoire, the man of her dreams. She moves away with him, far from her friends and family, including her twin sister. But as time moves on, she begins to discover the possessive and dangerous nature of her partner.

== Cast ==
- Virginie Efira as Blanche and Rose
- Melvil Poupaud as Grégoire
- Dominique Reymond as Lawyer
- Romane Bohringer as Delphine
- Virginie Ledoyen as Candice
- Marie Rivière as Blanche and Rose's mother
- Guang Huo as Tony
- Laurence Côte as Catherine
- Bertrand Belin as David
- Nathalie Richard as Gynecologist

== Production ==
The film is produced by Édouard Weil and Alice Girard at Rectangle Productions with France 2 Cinéma and Les Films de Françoise.

== Release ==
The film was selected to be screened in the Cannes Premiere section of the 76th Cannes Film Festival, where it had its world premiere on 24 May 2023. On the same day, the film was theatrically released in France by Diaphana Distribution. International sales are handled by Goodfellas.

== Reception ==
=== Box office ===
Just the Two of Us grossed $5.0 million in France, and $102,244 in other territories, for a worldwide total of $5.1 million.

In France, the film opened alongside The Little Mermaid, The King of Algiers, Knights of the Zodiac and Lost & Found. The film sold 30,220 admissions on its first day, finishing 2nd at the box office, behind The Little Mermaid. It went on to sell 158,333 admissions in its opening weekend, finishing 4th at the box office, behind The Little Mermaid, Fast X and Guardians of the Galaxy Vol. 3. At the end of its theatrical run, the film sold a total of 651,546 admissions.

=== Critical response ===
On the review aggregator website Rotten Tomatoes, 71% of 14 critics' reviews are positive, with an average rating of 6.9/10. Metacritic, which uses a weighted average, assigned the film a score of 66 out of 100, based on 7 critics, indicating "generally favorable" reviews. Just the Two of Us received an average rating of 3.8 out of 5 stars on the French website AlloCiné, based on 32 reviews.

=== Accolades ===
Award	Date of ceremony	Category	Recipient(s)	Result	Ref.
César Awards	23 February 2024	Best Actor	Melvil Poupaud	Nominated	
César Awards	23 February 2024	Best Actress	Virginie Efira	Nominated	
César Awards	23 February 2024	Best Adaptation	Valérie Donzelli and Audrey Diwan	Won	
César Awards	23 February 2024	Best Original Music	Gabriel Yared	Nominated	
Lumière Awards	22 January 2024	Best Actor	Melvil Poupaud	Nominated	
