= Jacques Peuchmaurd =

- Born: 1923; Clichy-sous-Bois, France
- Died: 21 October 2015 (aged 91–92); Houdan, France
- Occupations: Novelist; Editor

Jacques Peuchmaurd (1923 – 21 October 2015) was a French writer, literary critic, and a publisher, winner of the 1966 Prix des libraires.

== Biography ==
Jacques Peuchmaurd studied history and geography in Paris. During World War II, he enlisted as a journalist in Germany for the bulletin of the French sent on behalf of the [Service du travail obligatoire|S.T.O.]. He was in Berlin at the time of the bombing of the city by the Allies, an episode from which he will draw a book: La Nuit allemande (1967).

After the war, it was for a while aliterary critic for the magazine Arts. He also worked for radio, notably with Jean Tardieu on the show Le club d'essai or Michel Polac at Le Masque et la Plume. He subsequently headed the press service of Éditions Julliard, before being hired by Éditions Robert Laffont, of which he became one of the closest collaborators as a literary director.

He was also the founder of the group of authors called "École de Brive" Which he directed for nearly twenty-five years, including authors such as Michel Peyramaure, Christian Signol, Claude Michelet, Gilbert Bordes, Colette Laussac...

As a writer, he was the author of several novels of autobiographical inspiration, including Le Soleil de Palicorna, which earned him the Prix des libraires in 1965 and Le plein été which made him the winner of the Prix Cazes in 1959.

He was Pierre Peuchmaurd's father

== Selected works ==
- 1958: Le Plein Été, Prix Cazes, 1959, La Table ronde, ISBN 978-2710325888
- 1965: Le Soleil de Palicorna — Prix des libraires
- 1967: La Nuit allemande
- 1973: Soleil cassé, Robert Laffond, ISBN 2-221-03470-8
- 1992: Les Vieilles Blessures, Robert Laffond, ISBN 2-221-08657-0
- 1996: L'École de Brive. Histoire familière et amicale (essay)

== Bibliography ==
- 2008: L. Bourdelas, Du Pays et de l'exil Un abécédaire de la littérature du Limousin, Les Ardents Editeurs, ISBN 2-917032-09-X
