= Hunting and Gathering (film) =

Hunting and Gathering (Ensemble, c'est tout)
- Promotional film poster
- Directed by: Claude Berri
- Screenplay by: Claude Berri
- Based on: Hunting and Gathering by Anna Gavalda
- Produced by: Claude Berri
- Starring: Audrey Tautou; Guillaume Canet; Laurent Stocker; Françoise Bertin
- Cinematography: Agnès Godard
- Edited by: François Gédigier
- Music by: Frédéric Botton
- Distributed by: Pathé
- Release date: 21 March 2007
- Running time: 97 minutes
- Country: France
- Language: French
- Budget: $12.2 million
- Box office: $45.8 million

Hunting and Gathering (French: Ensemble, c'est tout) is a 2007 French romantic film based on the writer Anna Gavalda's 2004 novel Hunting and Gathering (French: Ensemble, c'est tout). It was directed by Claude Berri, who also wrote the screenplay, and stars Audrey Tautou, Guillaume Canet, Laurent Stocker, Françoise Bertin and Alain Sachs. It premiered on 21 March 2007.

== Plot ==
The film opens showing the day-to-day life of an elderly lady named Paulette. Paulette lives alone, dedicated to her animals, in particular her cats, and her garden. Her worst fear is of dying far from her home and garden. However, when she takes a fall she is sent to hospital who then advise that she recovers in a nursing-home, much to her dismay.

Meanwhile, Camille, an artist and cleaning lady, lives a lonely and anorexic life in a small attic in Paris. One day she meets the shy postcard salesman Philibert, who is in temporary custody of a grand apartment in her building. This belonged to his recently deceased aristocratic forebear, and is filled with heirlooms. Philibert has arranged his life to have as little contact with the outer world as possible. Instead he lets his lodger, Franck - who works as a low-ranked cook in a big restaurant - take care of his shopping and other such things. Philibert and Franck are complete opposites; Philibert is a gentleman, with classical interests and preoccupations, who stutters when anxious. Franck is constantly busy; brash, gruff, confrontational and confident. He works long hours at the restaurant, and habitually spends his only day off going to visit his grandmother Paulette, who raised him.

Camille reaches out to Philibert on impulse, inviting him to 'picnic' in her attic. They hit it off, but in apparent denial of her sexual potency, Camille then has her hair cropped, "manière de petit garçon". Philibert's sexual orientation at this time in the movie is also not delineated.

Camille becomes bedridden, severely ill with the flu. Although Philibert has had only the one social contact with her, and having no reason to know how unwell she is, he feels protective towards, and worried about her. He enters her attic despite not getting any reply, finds her in a desperately weakened state, and carries her down to his apartment. When she recovers, he assumes she will stay on. This development is very unwelcome to Franck, who is permanently stressed-out by his work and distresses by drinking, playing angry punk rock, and entertaining women. The only outlet for his humanity is his care and concern towards his grandmother. Many heated arguments pass between Camille and Franck, the latter annoyed at her presence and the former finding him rude and disrespectful. This reaches a crisis when, whilst drunkenly directing an erotic dance by his latest nana, he refuses to turn down the music. Camille storms out and throws his boom-box out of the window. She later rectifies the situation by buying him a replacement stereo. Franck attempts to explain his behaviour, but acknowledges he is difficult, and that he finds her presence an irritant.

The turning point comes when, determined to return to her tiny attic, Camille cannot find the key. Franck tells her that he has it in his pocket but refuses to give it back. He says it is he who should leave, asking that she stay with Philibert, who is decidedly happier and more eager to interact with others when she is around. He says he will definitely leave unless she stays.

Meanwhile, Philibert has joined a comedy club with encouragement from a woman to whom he has recently taken a very strong liking. Initially, people laugh at his stutter, however he takes classes and discovers that it disappears when he performs. Philibert later gives a show for the public, demonstrating considerable comic talent, at the start of which he proposes to his girlfriend on stage.

After a few months in respite care, Paulette is eager to return home, however she is too fragile to live alone. Camille, who has become close with the old woman, convinces Franck to let her live at Philibert's apartment, where she will quit her unsatisfactory job in order look after Paulette. Initially hesitant, Franck agrees and his grandmother moves in.

Around the same time Franck and Camille, whose relationship turned a corner after the incident with the stereo, enter a period of flirting. However, when this evolves into a sexual relationship, Camille sets the rule of not falling in love. Franck is visibly upset and withdraws emotionally from Camille, as he has already fallen in love with her.

Paulette later returns to her home for a week, with Camille resident to help out. However almost immediately she passes away, exactly as she wanted, in her beloved home. At the same time, Philibert's apartment is sold by his great-aunt and the trio break up. Camille, realising she is in love with Franck, tries to contact him, in spite of his remaining withdrawn.

After she waits for him outside his restaurant, they go out for a drink where Franck reveals he is moving to England at the end of the week. Camille suggests that he should stay in France, and buy a restaurant where they had eaten for her birthday, so he could be his own boss. Franck, sick of her tiptoeing around the central issue, asks her why she doesn't just ask him to stay (implicitly, because she loves him) to which Camille replies that she's afraid.

Later that week, Camille arrives just in time to say goodbye to Franck. Finally she is able to beg him to stay, but he replies that he has already left in his mind. Heartbroken, Camille walks out of the train station where she receives a call from Franck. He tells her he's worried that she is walking all alone, crying and lost. He pretends to be passing through customs, but in reality, unbeknownst to Camille, he has instead followed her. She denies his concerns and pretends to be OK. He shoulder-taps her and calls her bluff. The two kiss passionately, happy to be together again.

The film ends with Franck working at his restaurant, which is evidently highly popular. Franck's demeanour is entirely changed; he is no longer gruff and stressed, but personable and generous of himself. Camille, Philibert and his wife all work there as well. When Franck sees Camille admiring a baby, someone jokes about when it's her time to be a mother. In response, Franck picks Camille up and takes her out back to his office.

== Cast ==
- Audrey Tautou as Camille Fauque
- Guillaume Canet as Franck Lestafier
- Laurent Stocker as Philibert Marquet de la Tubelière
- Françoise Bertin as Paulette
- Firmine Richard as Mamadou
- Danièle Lebrun as Camille's Mother
- Béatrice Michel as Carine
- Alain Sachs as Work doctor
- Sandrine Mazéas as Sandrine
- Hélène Surgère as Yvonne
- Juliette Arnaud as Aurélia
- Pierre Gérald as Gilbert
- Kahena Saighi as Samia
- Michel Dubois as the doctor
- Jacques Ciron as the vicar
- Marie-France Mignal as Madame Marquet de la Tubelière
- Bernard Dhéran as Monsieur Marquet de la Tubelière

== Reception ==
On review aggregator website Rotten Tomatoes, the film holds an approval rating of 100% based on 5 reviews, with an average rating of 7.6/10.

== Accolades ==
Cabourg Romantic Film Festival

- Won : Best Actor – Leading Role (Guillaume Canet)

César Awards (France)

- Won: César Award for Most Promising Actor (Laurent Stocker)
- Nominated: Best Actor – Supporting Role (Laurent Stocker)
- Nominated: Best Adaptation (Claude Berri)

NRJ Ciné Awards

- Won: French Actor of the Year (Guillaume Canet)

== See also ==
- Cinema of France
- List of French language films
