= I Wish Someone Were Waiting for Me Somewhere (film) =

- Directed by: Arnaud Viard
- Written by: Arnaud Viard in collaboration with Thomas Lilti, Emmanuel Courcol & Vincent Dietschy.
- Produced by: Marc-Benoît Créancier
- Starring: Jean-Paul Rouve; Alice Taglioni; Benjamin Lavernhe; Camille Rowe; Elsa Zylberstein; Aurore Clément; Sarah Adler; Nicolas Vaude; Quentin Dolmaire; Eriq Ebouaney
- Cinematography: Emmanuel Soyer
- Edited by: Véronique Bruque
- Music by: Clément Ducol
- Production companies: Easy Tiger; France 2 Cinéma
- Distributed by: Orange Studio (International); UGC Distribution (France)
- Release date: August 2019 (Angoulême)
- Languages: French; English
- Budget: $4.2 million
- Box office: $3.4 million

I Wish Someone Were Waiting for Me Somewhere (French: Je voudrais que quelqu'un m'attende quelque part) is a French film directed by Arnaud Viard released in 2019 with an adapted screenplay from Anna Gavalda's homonymous collection of twelve short stories.

== Plot ==
Aurore celebrates her 70th birthday surrounded by her friends and four grown children: the eldest Jean-Pierre is the father of a family and wine representative, Juliette is a French teacher and dreams of career as a writer, Margaux is a freelance photographer, and Mathieu is single at 30 years old. Since the death of their father, Jean-Pierre naturally assumes the paternalistic and benevolent role with his siblings. One day, he is contacted by his old friend Héléna, a fashionable theater actress, who tells him terrible news.

== Cast ==
- Jean-Paul Rouve as Jean-Pierre
- Alice Taglioni as Juliet
- Benjamin Lavernhe as Mathieu
- Camille Rowe as Margaux
- Elsa Zylberstein as Héléna
- Aurore Clément as Aurora
- Sarah Adler as Nathalie
- Nicolas Vaude as publisher Oscar Valois
- Quentin Dolmaire as Andréa
- Eriq Ebouaney as Mathieu's doctor

== Production ==
Most of the filming took place in Fixin, in Côte-d'Or. Part of the shooting took place from September 3 to 7, 2018 in Dijon.

== Box office ==
The film was first released in France on January 22, 2020, in 367 theaters and sold 27,040 tickets on opening day. The first week ends with 212,027 tickets sold. The second weekend saw attendance drop by 57.07% despite 22 additional theaters. The film is entering its seventh week passed the bar of 450,000 tickets sold.
