= Deloffre =

Deloffre is a French surname. Notable people with the surname include:

- Adolphe Deloffre (1817–1876), French violinist and conductor
- Jean Deloffre (born 1939), French footballer
- Jules Deloffre (1885–1963), French racing cyclist
- Virginie Deloffre, French author
