= Waiting for Bojangles (film) =

- Theatrical release poster
- Directed by: Régis Roinsard
- Written by: Romain Compingt; Régis Roinsard
- Based on: Waiting for Bojangles by Olivier Bourdeaut
- Produced by: Olivier Delbosc; Jean-Pierre Guérin
- Starring: Romain Duris; Virginie Efira; Grégory Gadebois
- Cinematography: Guillaume Schiffman
- Edited by: Loïc Lallemand
- Music by: Clare Manchon; Olivier Manchon
- Production companies: Curiosa Films; JPG Films
- Distributed by: StudioCanal
- Release dates: 13 October 2021 (La Roche-sur-Yon International Film Festival); 5 January 2022 (France)
- Running time: 124 minutes
- Countries: France; Belgium
- Language: French
- Budget: $13.4 million
- Box office: $4.5 million

Waiting for Bojangles (French: En attendant Bojangles) is a 2021 French-Belgian romantic drama film directed by Régis Roinsard, starring Romain Duris, Virginie Efira and Grégory Gadebois. It is an adaptation of Olivier Bourdeaut's novel of the same name.

== Cast ==
- Romain Duris as Georges Fouquet
- Virginie Efira as Camille Fouquet
- Grégory Gadebois as Charles, dit l'Ordure
- Solàn Machado-Graner as Gary Fouquet
- Fabienne Chaudat as Marie-Françoise
- Éliza Maillot as Francine
- François Raffenaud as a cocktail party guest
- Aurélia Petit as a teacher
- Christian Ameri as a florist
- Jean-Pierre Durand as a fire chief
- Milo Machado-Graner as Alexandre
- Irène Ismaïloff

== Reception ==
Bobby LePire of Film Threat gave the film a score of 10/10 and called it "mesmerizing from start to finish."

Ray Gill of Willamette Week rated the film 4 stars out of 4 and called it an "uneasy thrill ride full of uncertainty, as any great love story should be."

Calum Marsh of The New York Times wrote that the "vision of a life of immeasurable joy and passion — one lived solely for love, without limits or qualifications — is beautiful", and while the film is in "constant jeopardy of seeming maudlin or, worse, a little corny", it is an "admirable problem".

Christy Lemire of RogerEbert.com rated the film 2 stars out of 4 and wrote that despite "charismatic" and "committed" performances from Duris and Efira, the film spends "much" of its "overlong" running time depicting mental illness as an "adorable personality quirk, a source of good-time party vibes, even a glamorous quality", and that once the "frothy French romance evolves into a more serious drama" it "turns turgid, causing a jarring tonal shift."

Josh Kupecki of The Austin Chronicle rated the film 2 stars out of 5 wrote that the while the film "looks marvelous, with Roinsard artfully weaving through throngs of partygoers placed in vibrant, lived-in spaces and exotic locales", and Efira "continues her run of outstanding performances", she is "ultimately ill-served by a character and a film that’s removed any gravitas it seeks to instill by paradoxically not being removed enough."
