= François Vallejo =

French writer

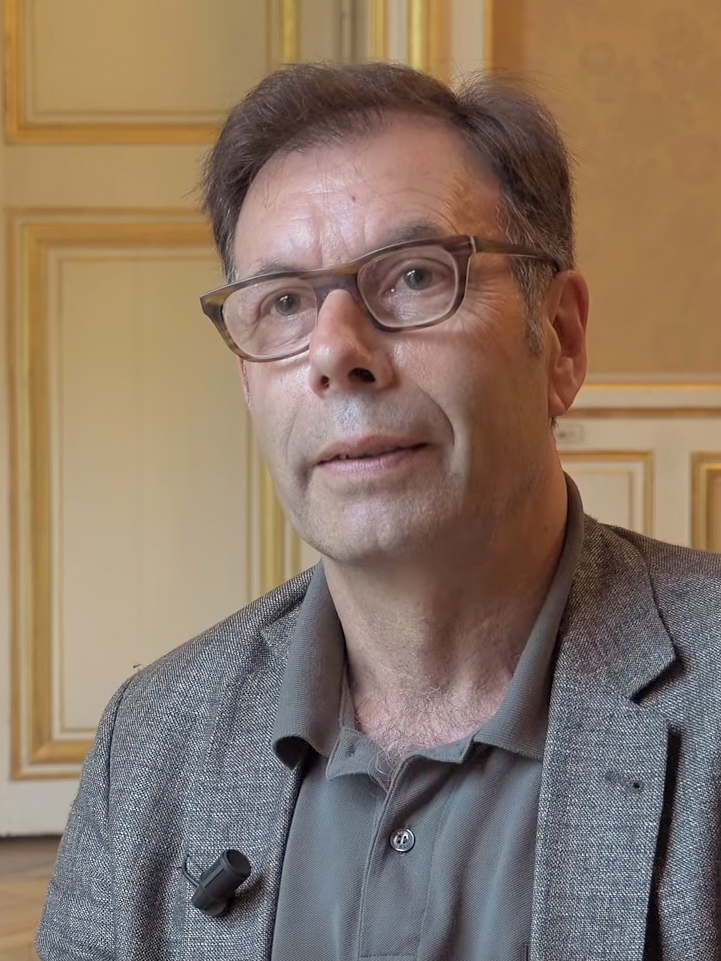
François Vallejo (2018).jpg

François Vallejo (1960, Le Mans) is a French professor of literature and a writer.

Passionate about Claudel, then by Louis-Ferdinand Céline, François Vallejo studied letters. He became a professor of classical literature at Le Havre and began writing novels at the end of the 1990s.

In 2001, his novel Madame Angeloso was part of the second selection of the Prix Goncourt and was also selected for the Femina and the Renaudot.

== Work ==
All his books are published by éditions Viviane Hamy:

- 1998: Vacarme dans la salle de bal
- 2000: Pirouettes dans les ténèbres
- 2001: Madame Angeloso – prix "roman" de France-Télévisions 2001
- 2003: Groom – prix des libraires and prix Culture et Bibliothèques pour tous 2004
- 2005: Le Voyage des grands hommes
- 2006: Ouest – prix du Livre Inter 2007
- 2007: Dérive
- 2008: L’Incendie du Chiado
- 2010: Les Sœurs Brelan
- 2012: Métamorphoses
- 2014: Fleur et Sang
- 2016: Un dangereux plaisir
