= L'Amour et les Forêts =

2014 novel by Éric Reinhardt

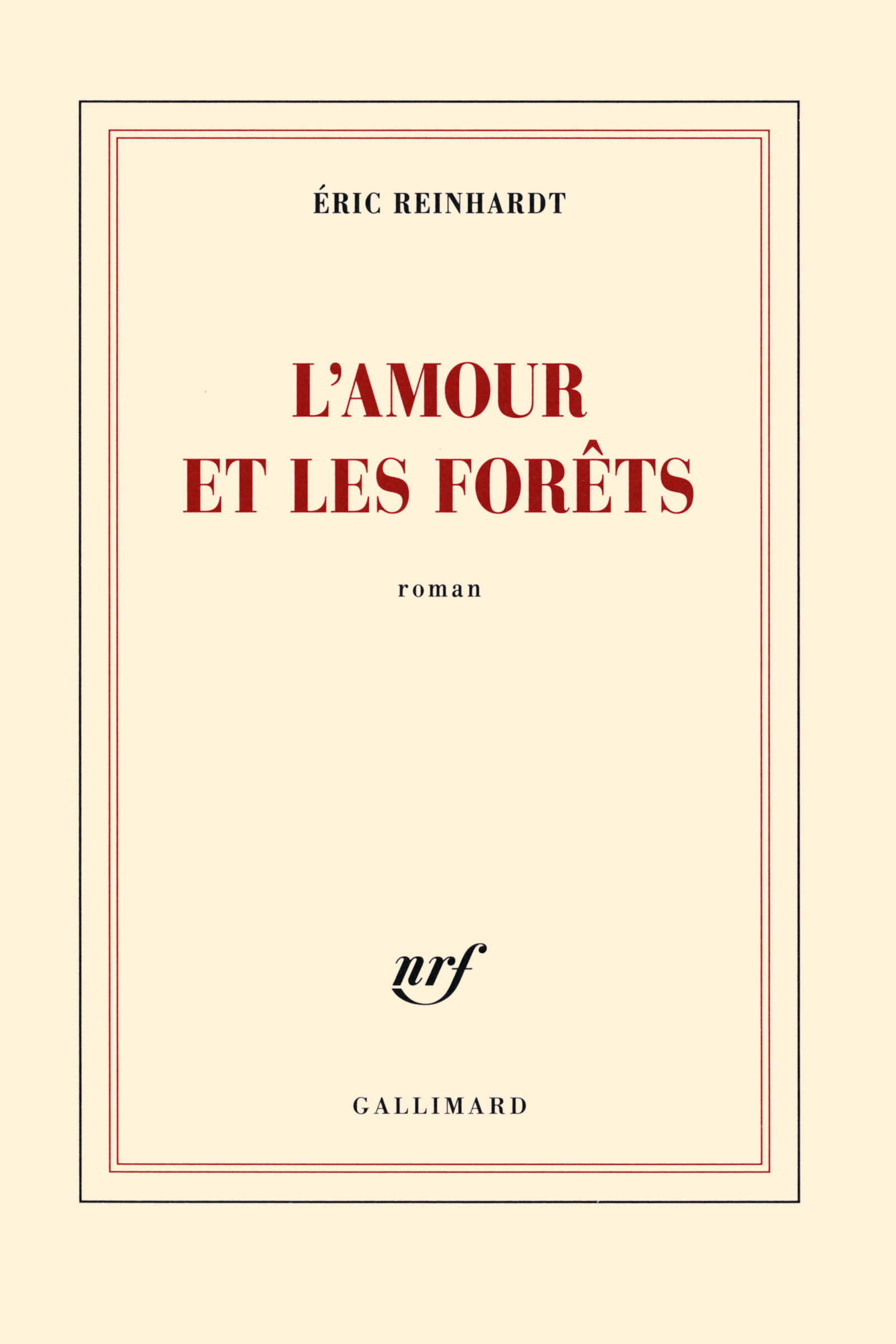
- Collection Blanche cover (first edition)
- Author: Éric Reinhardt
- Language: French
- Publisher: Gallimard
- Publication date: 21 August 2014
- Publication place: France
- Media type: Print
- Pages: 368
- ISBN: 978-2-07-014397-9
- OCLC: 889705436

L'Amour et les Forêts is a 2014 novel by French author Éric Reinhardt, published by Éditions Gallimard on 21 August 2014.

== Premise ==
The narrator recounts the story of Bénédicte Ombredanne, who is trapped in a toxic and abusive marriage with her controlling husband Jean-François. After another violent argument, Bénédicte registers on the online dating service Meetic. She connects with Christian, a gentle and attentive man who appears to be the opposite of her husband. She decides to meet Christian in real life and spend the day with him, a choice she will pay dearly for when she returns home.

== Reception ==
L'Amour et les Forêts was well received by critics. It sold over 100,000 copies in its first year of publication.

The novel was awarded the Prix France Télévisions and the Prix Renaudot des lycéens for 2014. It also received the Prix France Culture-Télérama for 2015. It was also named Best French Novel (ex-æquo) on the list of the 20 best books of 2014 by the magazine Lire.

== Film adaptation ==
A film adaptation was directed by Valérie Donzelli, from a screenplay written by Donzelli and Audrey Diwan. It stars Virginie Efira and Melvil Poupaud in the main roles. The film was screened in the Cannes Premiere section of the 76th Cannes Film Festival on 24 May 2023, being theatrically released in France on the same day.
