= Waiting for Bojangles =

2016 novel by Olivier Bourdeaut

- First edition cover
- Author: Olivier Bourdeaut
- Original title: En attendant Bojangles
- Translator: Regan Kramer
- Cover artist: Valeriy Kachaev
- Language: French
- Publisher: Éditions Finitude
- Publication date: 7 January 2016
- Publication place: Le Bouscat
- English publication date: 19 March 2019
- Media type: Print (paperback)
- Pages: 160
- ISBN: 978-2-36339-063-9
- OCLC: 936301573
- Dewey Decimal: 843/.92
- LC Class: PQ2702.O967 E5 2015

Waiting for Bojangles (French: En attendant Bojangles) is the debut novel by Olivier Bourdeaut, published by Éditions Finitude on 7 January 2016. It was an international bestseller. An English translation by Regan Kramer was published by Simon & Schuster on 19 March 2019. A film adaptation of the same name was released in 2021.

== Plot ==
The novel tells the story of an eccentric couple, Louise and George, and their young son. They live together in their apartment, which also accommodates Mademoiselle Superfluous, a pet demoiselle crane from Numidia, and, occasionally, the Senator. Nobody opens the mail. Each day the couple dance to the song "Mr. Bojangles", as covered by Nina Simone. The narrative depicts Louise's battle with mental illness and how the family struggles to cope. The novel is written partially in rhyme and is interspersed with entries from George's diary.

== Background and publication ==
Olivier Bourdeaut was a real estate agent in Nantes when the loss of his work led him to devote himself to literature. He spent two years writing his first novel, a dark and cynical work over 500 pages long which was rejected by publishers. While residing with his parents in Spain he devoted himself to writing the opposite, a more lighthearted work. Waiting for Bojangles was written in seven weeks. In April 2015, Bourdeaut sent the manuscript to Éditions Finitude, who enthusiastically accepted.

== Reception ==
Kirkus Reviews wrote, "Its part-rhyming structure almost always feels organic (only occasionally reading as cutesy or forced) and lends the narrative a sense of flow and momentum. But it's the irresistible, childlike sense of delight—even in the face of unimaginable sorrow—that renders the novel a genuinely enjoyable reading experience and one that sparks complex and conflicting emotions".

French critic Bernard Pivot praised the novel for its "absurdity made all the more irresistible because it's smart and under control".

== Accolades ==
The novel received several French literary awards, including:

- Prix du roman France Télévisions
- Prix Emmanuel Roblès
- Grand prix RTL-Lire
- Prix du roman des étudiants France Culture-Télérama
- Prix de l'Académie littéraire de Bretagne et des Pays de la Loire

== Adaptations ==
In 2017, a theatre adaptation was produced by Victoire Berger-Perrin with Anne Charrier, Didier Brice and Victor Boulenger in the main roles. It debuted in July 2017 at the OFF Festival of the Festival d'Avignon. The play was staged at the Théâtre de la Pépinière in Paris beginning in January 2018. Charrier was succeeded by Julie Delarme in later productions. The play was broadcast on France 4 on 3 April 2022.

On 7 September 2017, the novel was adapted for the radio programme Samedi noir and broadcast on France Culture.

The novel was adapted as a comic by Ingrid Chabbert and Carole Maurel, published as a comics album by Éditions Steinkis in November 2017.

In 2020, Éditions Finitude published a new edition of the novel illustrated by cartoonist Christian Cailleaux.

A film adaptation of the same name was directed by Régis Roinsard, starring Romain Duris and Virginie Efira in the roles of the father and the mother. It premiered in October 2021 at La Roche-sur-Yon International Film Festival. It was released theatrically in France on 5 January 2022.

From 11 to 23 January 2022, an exhibition of paintings by Susana Machado inspired by the story of the novel and the shooting of the film was presented at the Galerie du Génie de la Bastille in the 11th arrondissement of Paris.
