= Valentine Goby =

French writer (born 1974)

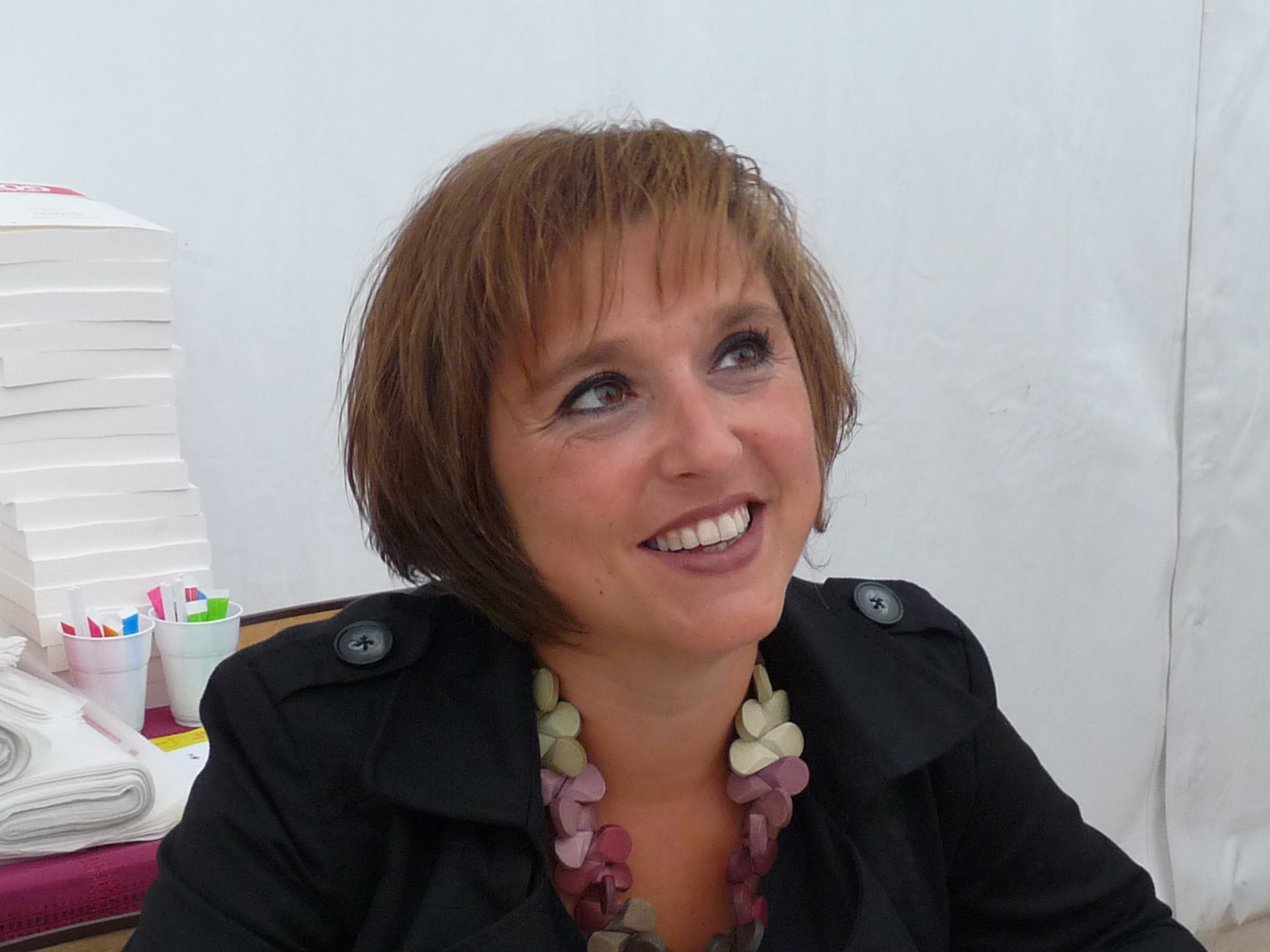
- Goby in 2011
- Born: 1974 (age 51–52); Grasse, France
- Education: Sciences Po
- Writing career
- Notable awards: Ordre des Arts et des Lettres

Valentine Goby (born 1974 in Grasse) is a French writer.

== Biography ==
After studying at Sciences Po, Valentine Goby lived three years in Asia, in Hanoi and in Manila, where she worked for humanitarian associations with street children. She started her professional career at Accenture where she worked in Human Resources from 1999 to 2001. She never stopped writing, and published her first novel in 2002 at Éditions Gallimard: La Note sensible. She became a teacher of literature and theater, a profession she worked in college for eight years before devoting herself entirely to writing, and to numerous projects around books: workshops, meetings, conferences, writing residencies in the middle school, media library, university. She is currently a lecturer at Sciences Po in literature and writing workshops, literary consultant for the book festival of Metz 2017, and columnist for the newspaper La Croix from September 2016 to January 2017. In addition to her 13 publications in general literature, she writes an important work for the youth.

Valentine Goby is the laureate of the Hachette Foundation, Young Writers Scholarship 2002 and was awarded the Mediterranean Youth Prize, the prix du premier roman de l'université d'Artois, the prix Palissy, the prix René Fallet and the Prix premier roman de Culture et bibliothèques pour tous de la Sarthe in 2003. She has since received numerous awards for each of her novels, in general literature and in youth literature.

She was awarded the 2014 prix des libraires 2014 for her novel Kinderzimmer published at Actes Sud. The same novel received the literary prize of high school students of Ile-de-France awarded on 20 March 2015 during the Book Fair as well as 10 other awards. It has been translated or is being translated into six languages in addition to French.

Valentine Goby has been President of the Permanent Council of Writers since 2014 and Vice-President of The Charter of Youth Authors and Illustrators. She is Knight of Arts and Letters.

== Works ==
- La Note sensible, Gallimard, 2002 ISBN 2070765415; Folio, 2004 ISBN 207031331X
- Sept jours, Gallimard, 2003; ISBN 2070733025; Folio, 2016
- L'Antilope blanche, Gallimard, 2005 ISBN 2070774732; Feryane, 2006 ISBN 2840116928; Folio, 2007 ISBN 2070347109
- Manuelo de la Plaine, Gallimard Jeunesse, coll. Folio junior, 2007
- Petit éloge des grandes villes, Gallimard, coll. Folio 2 euros, 2007
- L'Échappée, Gallimard, 2007 ISBN 207078407X; Folio, 2008, Prix Ouest 2008
- Le Rêve de Jacek, de la Pologne aux Corons du Nord, Autrement Jeunesse, 2007; Casterman poche, 2015
- Le Cahier de Leila, de l'Algérie à Billancourt, Autrement Jeunesse, 2007; Casterman poche, 2015
- Adama ou la vie en 3D, du Mali à Saint-Denis, Autrement Jeunesse, 2008; Casterman poche, 2015
- Le Secret d'Angelica, de l'Italie aux fermes du Sud-ouest, Autrement Jeunesse, 2008
- Qui touche à mon corps je le tue, Gallimard, 2008; Folio, 2010
- Thiên An ou la grande traversée, du Viêtnam à Paris XIII, Autrement Jeunesse, 2009; Casterman poche, 2015
- Chaïma et les secrets d'Hassan, du Maroc à Marseille, Autrement Jeunesse, 2009
- Anouche ou la fin de l'errance, de l'Arménie à la Vallée du Rhône, Autrement Jeunesse, 2010
- João ou l'année des révolutions, du Portugal à Champigny, Autrement Jeunesse, 2010
- Méduses, Jérôme Millon, 2010; Folio, 2011
- Antonio ou la Résistance, de l'Espagne à la région Toulousaine, Autrement Jeunesse, 2011
- Banquises, Albin Michel, 2011; Livre de poche, 2013
- Lyuba ou la tête dans les étoiles, de la Roumanie à l'Île de France, Autrement Jeunesse, 2012
- Le Voyage immobile, Actes Sud Junior, 2012
- Le Mystère de Hawa'a, Albin Michel Jeunesse, 2013 (album)
- La Porte rouge, 2013, Thierry Magnier, (series "Photoroman")
- Une preuve d'amour, Éditions Thierry Magnier, 2013 (roman jeunesse)
- Kinderzimmer, Actes Sud, 2013 ISBN 9782330022600; coll. Babel, 2015, Prix des libraires 2014; Autres prix 2014 : Prix Libraires en Seine - Prix des lecteurs du Maine Libre - Prix SOS libraires - Prix littéraires Gabrielle-d'Estrées et Jackie-Bouquin - Prix littéraire de l'Académie de Bretagne et des Pays de Loire - Prix coup de cœur des lecteurs, Salon du livre d'histoire de Blois - Prix Jean-d'Heurs du roman historique - Prix Jean Monnet des Jeunes Européens - Prix des lycéens et apprentis d'Ile de France - Prix des Lycéens de Gujan Mestras - Prix des lycéens et apprentis de la région PACA
- Les Deux Vies de Ning. De la Chine à Paris-Belleville, illustrated by Philippe de Kemmeter, Autrement Jeunesse, 2013
- La Fille surexposée, Alma Editeur (series "Pabloïd"), 2014 ISBN 9782362791031
- Baumes, Actes Sud, 2014 (series "Essences") ISBN 978-2-330-03689-8
- Le Grand Mensonge de la famille Pommerol, Thierry Magnier, 2015 (series "En voiture Simone !")
- Juliette Pommerol chez les Angliches, Thierry Magnier, 2016 (series "En voiture Simone ! ")
- Le Sorcier vert, Thierry Magnier, 2016 series "Les décadrés") album
- Tous Français d'ailleurs !, Casterman, 2016, Grands format jeunesse (compilation of 6 novels of the series "Français d'ailleurs")
- Un paquebot dans les arbres, Actes Sud, 2016
  - - Prix du roman de L'Hebdo 2016, Roman français de l'année 2016 du journal Le Parisien

== Prizes ==
- 2003: Prix premier roman de Culture et bibliothèques pour tous de la Sarthe for La note sensible.
