= Serge Lentz =

French journalist and writer (1934–2021)

- Born: 16 January 1934; Paris, France
- Died: 22 December 2021 (aged 87); Brussels, Belgium
- Occupations: Journalist; Writer

Serge Lentz (16 January 1934 – 22 December 2021) was a French journalist and writer.

== Life and career ==
Lentz was awarded the Prix des libraires in 1982 for the novel Les Années-sandwiches. In 1985, he won the Prix Interallié for Vladimir Roubaïev. His final novel, La Stratégie du Bouffon, was described as the "best novel of the year" by the magazine Lire.

In addition to his career as a writer, Lentz covered wars in the Democratic Republic of the Congo, Algeria, Vietnam, Israel, Biafra, Iraq, and others. In 1963, he was the first journalist from the West to travel to the People's Republic of China for the Washington Post. He also reported for Paris Match. He produced several docuseries for France 2.

Lentz died in Brussels on 22 December 2021, at the age of 87.
