= Hunting and Gathering (novel) =

2004 novel by Anna Gavalda

- Author: Anna Gavalda
- Original title: Ensemble, c'est tout
- Translator: Alison Anderson
- Language: French
- Publisher: Le Dilettante
- Publication date: 2004
- Publication place: France
- English publication date: 2006
- Pages: 603
- ISBN: 9782842630850

Hunting and Gathering is a 2004 novel by the French writer Anna Gavalda. Its original French title is Ensemble, c'est tout, which means "Being together, period". The narrative follows an anorexic young woman who struggles with the neuroses, both of her own and of people around her. The book was adapted into a 2007 film with the same title, directed by Claude Berri.

== Reception ==
Gerry Feehily reviewed the book for The Independent, and saw a parallel between its themes and those in Candide by Voltaire: "But Voltaire was pulling our leg. Candide is a starry-eyed idiot whose idealism is dashed to bits by the horrors of absolutist Europe. His resignation is inevitable. With Gavalda, resignation, a longing for stasis, is a virtue. That she has a worldwide audience suggests she has tapped into a mood which many people share."

== See also ==
- 2004 in literature
- Contemporary French literature
