= Grand prix RTL-Lire =

French literary award

The grand prix RTL-Lire is one of the main literary awards of the winter/spring literary season in France. Given in partnership with Lire magazine, it rewards a French-language novel chosen by a jury of readers.

== History ==
In 1992, the grand prix RTL-Lire took over the "prix RTL grand public" created in 1975. It is awarded in March of each year at the Salon Livre Paris (Paris Book Fair) to a French-language novel by a jury composed of one hundred readers chosen by twenty booksellers in France. A long-list of ten authors followed by a short-list of five is selected in January by the editors of the RTL radio station and the magazine Lire.

The award-winning book benefits from a promotional campaign and extensive editorial coverage on RTL radio and in the magazine Lire.

== List of laureates of the Grand prix RTL-Lire ==
Year		Author	Work	Publisher (x times)
1992	nothumb	Gilbert Bordes	La Nuit des Hulottes	Éditions Robert Laffont
1993	nothumb	Michel del Castillo	Le Crime des pères	Éditions du Seuil
1994	nothumb	Jean d'Ormesson	La Douane de mer	Éditions Gallimard
1995	nothumb	Serge Brussolo	La Moisson d'hiver	Éditions Denoël
1996	nothumb	Anne Wiazemsky	Hymnes à l'amour	Gallimard (2)
1997	nothumb	Jean-Paul Kauffmann	La Chambre noir de Longwood	La Table ronde
1998	nothumb	Jean-Christophe Grangé	Les Rivières pourpres	Albin Michel
1999		John La Galite	Zacharie	Éditions Omnibus
2000	nothumb	Anna Gavalda	Je voudrais que quelqu'un m'attende quelque part	Le Dilettante
2001	nothumb	Andreï Makine	La Musique d'une vie	
2002	nothumb	Tonino Benacquista	Quelqu'un d'autre	Gallimard (3)
2003	nothumb	Philippe Besson	L'Arrière-saison	Éditions Julliard
2004		Philippe Delepierre	Fred Hamster et Madame Lilas	Éditions Liana Levi
2005	nothumb	Gérard Mordillat	Les Vivants et les Morts	Calmann-Lévy
2006		Anne Godard	L'Inconsolable	Éditions de Minuit
2007	nothumb	Marc Dugain	Une exécution ordinaire	Gallimard (4)
2008	nothumb	Boualem Sansal	Le Village de l'Allemand	Gallimard (5)
2009	nothumb	Olivier Adam	Des vents contraires	Éditions de l'Olivier
2010	nothumb	Kim Thúy	Ru	Éditions Liana Levi (2)
2011	nothumb	Fabrice Humbert	La Fortune de Sila	Éditions Le Passage
2012		Jean-Luc Seigle	En vieillissant les hommes pleurent	Flammarion
2013	nothumb	Jeanne Benameur	Profanes	Actes Sud
2014	nothumb	Maylis de Kerangal	Réparer les vivants	Gallimard (6)
2015	nothumb	Léonor de Récondo	Amours	Sabine Wespieser éditeur
2016		Olivier Bourdeaut	En attendant Bojangles	Éditions Finitude
2017	nothumb	Tanguy Viel	Article 353 du Code pénal	Éditions de Minuit
2018	nothumb	Isabelle Carré	Les Rêveurs	Éditions Grasset
2019	nothumb	Joseph Ponthus	À la ligne	La Table Ronde
2020	nothumb	Sandrine Colette	Et toujours les forêts	JC Lattès
2021	nothumb	Jean-Baptiste Andrea	Des diables et des saints	Iconoclaste
2022	nothumb	Hélène Gestern	555	Arléa
2023	nothumb	Gaëlle Nohant	Le Bureau d'éclaircissement des destins	Éditions Grasset (2)
2024		Claire Deya	Un monde à refaire	Éditions de l'Observatoire
2025	nothumb	Camille Laurens	Ta promesse	Gallimard (7)
2026		Michaël Dichter	On l'appelait Bennie Diamond	Éditions Les Léonides
