= José Cabanis =

French writer and lawyer

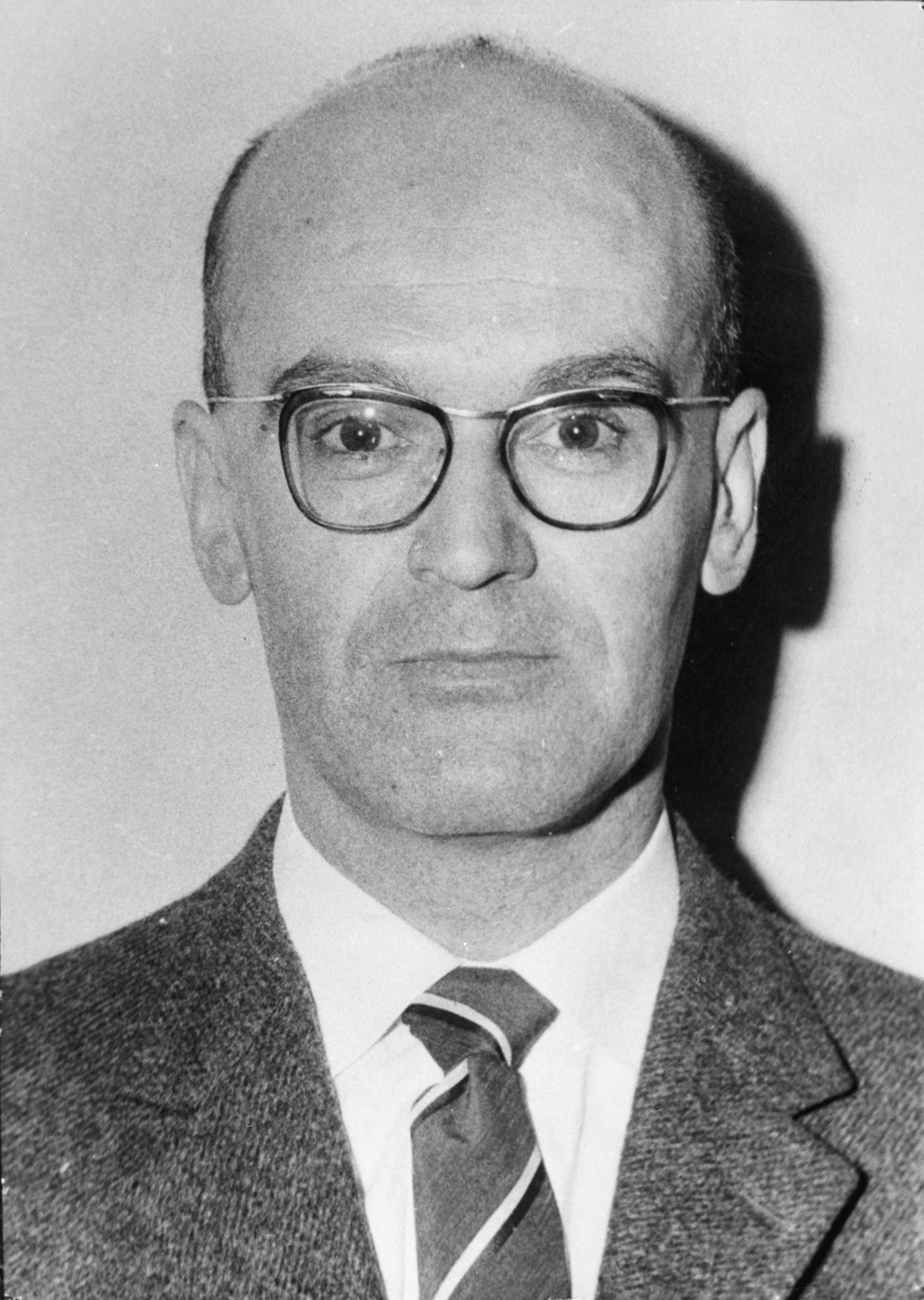
- José Cabanis in 1962
- Born: Joseph Marie Cabanis; 2 March 1922; Toulouse, France
- Died: 6 October 2000 (aged 78); Balma, France
- Occupation: Novelist • Essayist
- Known for: Member of the Académie Française
- Children: 2

José Cabanis (2 March 1922 – 6 October 2000) was a French novelist, essayist, historian and magistrate. He was elected mainteneur of the Académie des Jeux floraux in 1965 and a member of the Académie Française in 1990.

== Works ==
- La Pitié (Schopenhauer, Nietzche, Max Scheler, Dostoïevski) (Gallimard, 1948)
- L’Organisation de l’État d’après La République de Platon et La Politique d'Aristote (Gallimard, 1948)
- L’Âge ingrat (Gallimard, 1952)
- L’Auberge fameuse (Gallimard, 1953)
- Juliette Bonviolle (Gallimard, 1954)
- Le Fils (Gallimard, 1956)
- Les Mariages de raison (Gallimard, 1957)
- Jouhandeau (Gallimard, 1959)
- Le Bonheur du jour, (Gallimard, 1960), Prix des Critiques
- Les Cartes du temps, (Gallimard, 1962), Prix des libraires
- Plaisir et lectures. I. (Gallimard, 1964)
- Les Jeux de la nuit (Gallimard, 1964)
- Proust et l’écrivain (Hachette, 1965)
- La Bataille de Toulouse (Prix Renaudot) (Gallimard, 1966)
- Plaisir et lectures. II. (Gallimard, 1968)
- Une vie, Rimbaud (Hachette, 1968)
- Des Jardins en Espagne (Gallimard)
- Le Sacre de Napoléon (Gallimard)
- Préface du Tome I des œuvres de Julien Green (Bibliothèque de la Pléiade, 1972)
- Charles X, roi ultra (Prix des Ambassadeurs) (Gallimard, 1974)
- Saint-Simon l’admirable (Grand Prix de la Critique) (Gallimard, 1974)
- Saint-Simon ambassadeur (Gallimard, 1974)
- Les Profondes Années (Grand Prix de Littérature de l’Académie française) (Gallimard, 1976)
- Michelet, le prêtre et la femme (Gallimard, 1978)
- Petit entracte à la guerre (Gallimard, 1980)
- Lacordaire et quelques autres (Gallimard, 1982)
- Préface aux Conférences de Lacordaire à Toulouse (Éd. d'Aujourd'hui)
- Le Musée espagnol de Louis-Philippe. Goya (Gallimard, 1986)
- Préface aux Affaires de Rome, de Lamennais (La Manufacture, 1986)
- L’Escaladieu (Gallimard, 1987)
- Pages de journal (Éd. Sables, 1987)
- Pour Sainte-Beuve (Gallimard)
- Chateaubriand, qui êtes-vous ? (La Manufacture, 1988)
- Préface de La Correspondance Lacordaire-Montalembert (Le Cerf, 1989)
- L’Âge ingrat, réédition de l’ensemble du cycle (Gallimard, 1989)
- Préface du Tome II des Œuvres de Julien Green (Bibliothèque de la Pléiade, 1990)
- Le Crime de Torcy, suivi de Fausses nouvelles (Gallimard, 1990)
- En marge d’un Mauriac (Éd. Sables, 1991)
- Mauriac, le roman et Dieu (Gallimard, 1991)
- Préface à un choix de pages du Temps immobile, de Claude Mauriac (Grasset, 1993)
- Préface à Dits et inédits, de Bussy-Rabutin (Éd. de l’Armançon, 1993)
- Dieu et la NRF, 1909–1949 (Gallimard, 1994)
- Le Diable à la NRF, 1911–1951 (Gallimard, 1996)
- Autour de Dieu et le Diable à la NRF (Éd. Sables, 1996)
- Magnificat (Éd. Sables, 1997)
- Jardins d’écrivains (with Georges Herscher) (Actes-Sud, 1998)
- Julien Green et ses contemporains, le cas Mauriac (en collaboration à Littératures contemporaines, Julien Green) (Klincksieck, 1998)
- Le Sacre de Napoléon (new edition) (Le Grand livre du mois, 1998)
- Entretien (with Chateaubriand) (Éd. Cristel, 1998)
- Lettres de la Forêt-Noire, 1943–1998 (Gallimard, 2000)
