= Claude Brami =

French writer (born 1948)

Claude Brami (born 20 December 1948 in Tunis) is a French writer, winner of the 1982 Prix des libraires. During the 1970s, he wrote a dozen detective novels under the pseudonyms Christopher Diable and Julien Sauvage.

== Biography ==
He was a great lover of detective novels from the age of eleven. In 1968, while still a student, he wrote his first book. La Lune du fou appeared in 1973 under the pseudonym Julien Sauvage. Fifteen police novels will follow under this pseudonym, whose series devoted to the exploits of the adventurer Bruno Campara, nicknamed the Condottiere and three novels of espionage that stage Nicolas Rone. Under the pen name Christophe Diable, he gave three detective novels: Une affaire trop personnelle, La Petite Fille au chewing-gum (un chewing-gum qui tue) and La Plus Longue Course d'Abraham Coles, chauffeur de taxi. This last title won the Grand Prix de Littérature Policière. After 1977, Brami lost interest in genre literature and, under his patronym, signed a few novels for the publishing house Denoël and Gallimard.

Claude Brami also works as a television advisor. He works on series for Victor Vicas on the first channel and for Claude Barma on the second. The author nevertheless continues to write on his typing machine every day and year-round novels for one copy every three or four months, because, he says: "If I stopped, I do not know if I would have the courage to start again".

He practices assiduously tennis and martial arts: he has high grades in karate and aikido.

== Works ==
=== NOvels ===
- 1981: Le Garçon sur la colline, Gallimard, ISBN 2-20-722645-X, Prix des libraires
- 1986: La Danse d'amour du vieux corbeau, Denoël
- 1987: La Grande Sœur, Denoël
- 1990: Parfums des étés perdus, Gallimard, Prix RTL Grand Public
- 1994: Mon amie d'enfance, Gallimard, Prix de l'Académie Littéraire de Bretagne et des Pays de la Loire
- 1997: La Chance des débutants, Gallimard

=== Novels under the pseudonym Christopher Diable ===
- 1973: Une Affaire trop personnelle, Denoël, "Crime-club"
- 1974: La Petite demoiselle au chewing-gum, Denoël, "Crime-club"
- 1977: La Plus Longue Course d'Abraham Coles, chauffeur de taxi, Denoël, 'Sueurs froides",- Grand Prix de Littérature Policière

=== Novels under the pseudonym Julien Sauvage ===
==== Séries "Condottiere" ====
- 1974: Le Condottiere, Fleuve noir, "Spécial Police" #1084
- 1974: Le Condottiere et la blonde qui pleurait, Fleuve noir, "Spécial Police #1115
- 1975: Le Condottiere et le Chasseur de scalps, Fleuve noir, "Spécial Police" #1191
- 1977: Le Condottiere et le Tueur au monocle, Fleuve noir, "Spécial Police" #1348

==== Spying series Nicolas Rone ====
- 1976: Le Jeu du scorpion, Fleuve noir, "Espionnage" #1282
- 1976: Le Tueur d'Amsterdam, Fleuve noir, "Espionnage" #1299
- 1977: Coup pourri, Fleuve noir, "Espionnage" #1352

==== Other novels ====
- 1973: La Lune du fou, Fleuve noir, "Spécial Police" #1013
- 1973: Portes closes, Fleuve noir, "Spécial Police" #1033

== Sources ==
- Claude Mesplède [in French] (2007). "A - I". Dictionnaire des littératures policières. Temps noir (in French). Vol. 1. Nantes: Joseph K. pp. 586–587 (notice Christopher Diable). ISBN 978-2-910-68644-4. OCLC 315873251..
