= Isabelle Hausser =

French novelist and translator (born 1953)

- Born: November 14, 1953 (age 72)
- Occupation: Novelist

Isabelle Hausser (born 14 November 1953 in Saint-Donat-sur-l'Herbasse in the Drôme department) is a French novelist and translator.

== Biography ==
She grew up in Sub-Saharan Africa and in Bordeaux. She graduated from the Institut d'études politiques de Bordeaux. She holds a master's degree in public law and is a former student of the École nationale d’administration in Strasbourg.

From 1978 to 1987, she was an administrative judge at the Administrative Tribunal of Paris. Married to the diplomat Michel Duclos, she accompanied him in her various posts: in Moscow from 1987 to 1991 where she held diplomatic posts, in Germany, 1994, Brussels, 1998, 2002, New York, Damascus in Syria from 2006 to 2009.

She debuted in 1986 with the novel Célubée which reached several editions. In 1994, she received the prix des Libraires for the novel Nitchevo. In addition to her own works, Isabelle Hausser-Duclos also translated 15 works from the German, English, Czech and Polish languages.

== Bibliography ==
=== Novels ===
- 1986: Célubée, Julliard, and Éditions de Fallois, 2000
- 1987: Une nuit, Julliard
- 1993: Nitchevo, de Fallois, prix des libraires 1994
- 1996: Les magiciens de l'âme, de Fallois
- 1998: La chambre sourde, de Fallois
- 2001: La table des enfants, de Fallois,
- 2003: Une comédie familiale, de Fallois
- 2006: Le passage des ombres, de Fallois
- 2010: Petit Seigneur, de Fallois
- 2014: Les couleurs du sultan, Buchet/Chastel

=== Translations ===
- 1987: Le Chock du futur (Future Shock) by Alvin Toffler, Éditions Gallimard
- 1993: Olympe de Gouges 1748–1793. Courtisane et militante des droits de la femme, by Paul Noack, de Fallois
- 1995: Whisky américain (Amerykańska whiskey) by Andrzej Szczypiorski, de Fallois
- 1996: Stefan Zweig, volume 3 : essais, by Stefan Zweig, LGF/Livre de Poche
- 1996: Les prodiges de la vie, by Stefan Zweig, LGF
- 1997: Album Zweig, by Stefan Zweig, LGF
- 1997: Je voulais l'unité de l'Allemagne, by Helmut Kohl, de Fallois
- 1999: Derrick et moi : mes deux vies, by Horst Tappert, de Fallois
- 2000: Mort transgénique, by Linda Grant, LGF
- 2000: L'heure étoilée du meurtrier (Hvězdná hodina vrahů) by Pavel Kohout, de Fallois, ISBN 2-87706-387-9.
- 2004: L'incendie. L'Allemagne sous les bombes 1940-1945, by Jörg Friedrich, de Fallois
- 2005: Ne tirez pas sur l'oiseau moqueur, by Harper Lee, de Fallois: reworking and updating of the translation and postface
- 2006: Le chirurgien ambulant, by Wolf Serno, de Fallois
- 2006: Le Centre introuvable : la pensée politique des doctrinaires sous la Restauration, by Aurelian Craiutu, Plon
- 2008: Le Chirurgien de Campodios, by Wolf Serno, de Fallois
- 2009: Louis-Philippe. Le prince et le roi. La France entre deux révolutions by Munro Price, de Fallois

== Literary awards ==
- 1994: prix des libraires for Nitchevo
- 2001: grand prix Jean-Giono for La table des enfants
- 2002: grand prix des lectrices de Elle for La table des enfants
- 2004: prix silhouette du 7e art for Une comédie familiale
- 2006: prix du jury des lecteurs de Vivre Plus for Le passage des ombres
