= Jacques Almira =

French writer

Jacques Almira (born Jacques Schaetzle in 1950) is a French writer, winner of the 1975 Prix Médicis.

== Works ==
- 1975: Le Voyage à Naucratis, Prix Médicis
- 1978: Le Passage du désir, Gallimard
- 1979: Le Marchand d'oublies, Gallimard
- 1984: Terrass Hôtel, Gallimard
- 1986: La Fuite à Constantinople, Prix des libraires
- 1988: Le Sémaphore, Gallimard
- 1990: Le Bal de la guerre ou la Vie de la princesse des Ursins, Gallimard
- 1991: La Reine des zoulous, Mercure de France
- 1992: Le Bar de la mer, Gallimard
- 1993: Le Manège, Gallimard
- 1998: Le Salon des apogées ou la Vie du prince Eugène de Savoie, Gallimard
- 2002: La Norme, Buchet/Chastel
