= Alain-Julien Rudefoucauld =

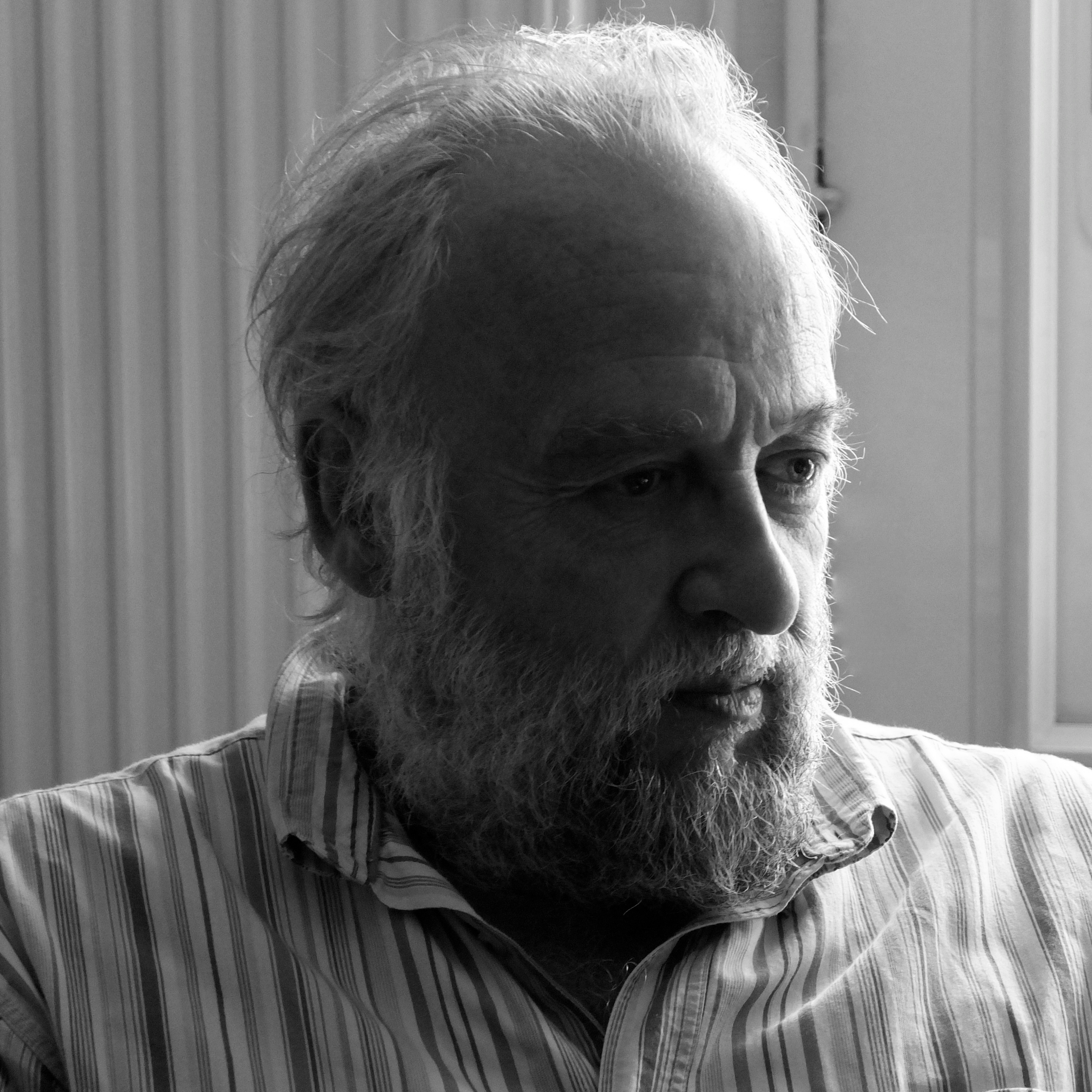
Alain-Julien Rudefoucauld

Alain Julien Rudefoucauld (born 1950, Mostaganem, in Algeria), is a French author who has published several novels and plays. He also wrote about fifty articles in the humanities.

== Works ==
Publications

- Au fond de la mer (unpublished).
- 1991: En faire quoi, Bordeaux
- 1996: Fatsflat et Sacrifice, Le Bouscat, l'Esprit du temps
- 1997: Dutzoll-Frontier, Le Bouscat, l'Esprit du temps
- 1998: Paroles en pointillés (preface), Mérignac, S. Charpentier
- 1998: Autonomie d'un meurtre (novel), Paris, Calmann-Lévy
- 1998: Dancing, Le Bouscat, l'Esprit du temps
- 1999: Êtra ou la Clarté de l'éphémère, Le Bouscat, l'Esprit du temps
- 2003: J'irai seul, Éditions du Seuil
- 2004: L'Ordre et le Silence, Le Bouscat, l'Esprit du temps
- 2007: L'Ombre et le Pinceau (theatre), Paris, L'Harmattan
- Autonomie d'un meurtre (novel), L'Harmattan (reprint)
- 2009: C'est ici que je suis (theatre), L'Harmattan
- 2009: Mémoire de chair (theatre), Paris, L'Harmattan
- 2011: Sophie Coming Out (theatre), L'Harmattan
- 2012: Le Dernier Contingent (novel), Auch, Éditions Tristam - Prix France Culture/Télérama.
- Une si lente obscurité (novel), Auch, Éditions Tristram, 2013. - Prix 2013 de la Page 111
