= Andrée Martinerie =

French writer (1917–1997)

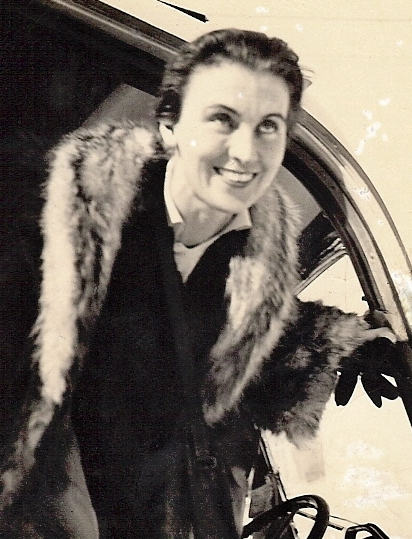
- Andrée Martinerie ca 1960
- Born: 17 April 1907; Belley, Ain, France
- Died: 1997 (aged 89–90)
- Occupation: Novelist
- Spouse: André Bertrand

Andrée Martinerie (17 April 1917 – 1997) was a 20th-century French writer, laureate of the prix des libraires on 1961.

== Biography ==
An aggregée of classical letters, Andrée Martinerie began her career by translating important authors such as Fitzroy Maclean, Herman Wouk, Irwin Shaw, L.P. Hartley and Mika Waltari. In 1961 she published a first novel, Les autres jours which obtained the Prix des Libraires. She never stopped publishing novels until the tragedy that cost two of her three grandchildren (1980). The only testimony and the album, she will publish after this drama will be devoted to the latter.

Andrée Martinerie was the wife of André Bertrand, a lawyer, and the mother of Christine Chambaz-Bertrand, a specialist in George Sand. She was also the mother of Geneviève Jurgensen.

== Work ==
- 1961: Les Autres Jours, prix des libraires, éditions Gallimard, ISBN 2070242498
- 1964: Le Rêve familier, éditions Grasset
- 1968: L'Été d'une vie, Grasset
- 1970: Quand finira la nuit ?, Grasset, ASIN B003CO95PC
- 1976: Une fille de vingt ans, Grasset, ISBN 2246003830
- 1980: L'Espace d'un cri, Grasset
- 1982: Une passion de grand-mère, éditions Robert Laffont, ISBN 978-2724215830
- 1985: Dis-moi, grand-mère (in collaboration with Geneviève Jurgensen), Robert Laffont
