= Antoine Bello =

French-American author (born 1970)

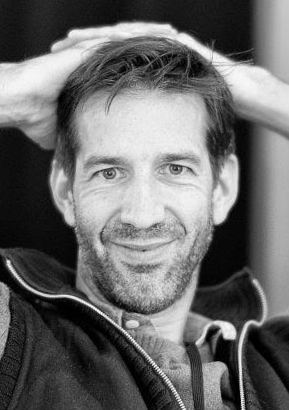
- Born: 25 March 1970 (age 56); Boston, Massachusetts, U.S.
- Occupation: Novelist
- Writing career
- Period: 1996-present
- Notable works: The Missing Piece; The Falsifiers; The Pathfinders
- Notable awards: Prix France Culture - Télérama
- Website: antoinebello.com

Antoine Bello (born 25 March 1970) is a French-American author born in Boston, Massachusetts, whose works have been widely translated. His novels touch on multiple subjects, such as the relation between reality and fiction, human cognition and journalism. He writes in French, his native tongue. He has been living in the greater New York Area since 2002.

== Work ==
Bello's first book, Les Funambules (ISBN 2070745023), a collection of short stories, was published in France in 1996. It received the Prix littéraire de la vocation awarded by the Fondation Bleustein-Blanchet. One of the short stories included in Les Funambules had received the Prix du jeune écrivain de langue française in 1993.

Since then, Bello's has published nine novels, which have been translated into a dozen languages, such as German, Russian, Greek and Japanese. Six of them are available in English : The Falsifiers (Kindle Edition, 2015), The Pathfinders (Kindle Edition, 2016), The Showrunners (Kindle Edition, 2017), An American Novel (Kindle Edition, 2016), The Disappearance of Emilie Brunet (Kindle Edition, 2016), and The Missing Piece (ISBN 0156013371). All his books have been published by Éditions Gallimard.

Bello's main body of work, known as the Falsificateurs trilogy, centers around a secret international organization, the CFR, which falsifies reality and rewrites history. The first installment, Les Falsificateurs (The Falsifiers), was published in 2007. Les Éclaireurs (ISBN 2070124266) was awarded the prestigious Prix France Culture - Télérama award in 2009. Les Producteurs was released in 2015. Bello's trilogy has taken a new significance with the current debate about fake news, prompting him to give interviews in French and Canadian media.

Bello is a staunch supporter of Wikipedia. Since 2014, he has been donating his royalties to the Wikimedia Foundation and urging his readers to follow suit. In an interview to the web-hosting company OVH, he compared Wikipedia to a public service. In another interview with the Wikimedia Foundation, he said he was humbled by the editors' dedication: "Every time I use it [Wikipedia], I think of the people who have taken the time and devoted long evenings doing that. And I wonder, ‘Who are these people? Why did they do it? What an appetite for knowledge and for sharing it they must have.’ And I feel blessed that people do that."

== Other pursuits ==
Prior to becoming a full-time writer, Bello co-founded the French company Ubiqus, which he sold in 2007. He's also the creator of the now-defunct ranking website Rankopedia.

In 2021, Bello founded The Population Project, an attempt at listing the full names and dates of birth of all humans alive.

== Bibliography ==
- Les Funambules, recueil de nouvelles (Manikin 100, Soltino, Go Ganymède !, Le dossier Krybolski et L'année Zu), éditions Gallimard, 1996. ISBN 9782070310005, OCLC 717072422
- Éloge de la pièce manquante, éditions Gallimard, 1998. ISBN 9782070749669, OCLC 475993480
- Les Falsificateurs, éditions Gallimard, 2007. ISBN 9782070783106, OCLC 82672721
- Les Éclaireurs, éditions Gallimard, 2009. ISBN 9782070124268, OCLC 303019631
- Enquête sur la disparition d'Émilie Brunet, éditions Gallimard, 2010. ISBN 9782070446896, OCLC 934955108
- Mateo, éditions Gallimard, 2013. ISBN 9782070456734, OCLC 982783059
- Roman américain, éditions Gallimard, 2014. ISBN 9782070466085, OCLC 936569668
- Les Producteurs, éditions Gallimard, 2015. ISBN 9782070793457, OCLC 980439876
- Ada, éditions Gallimard, 2016. ISBN 9782070179671, OCLC 958493977
- L'homme qui s'envola, éditions Gallimard, 2017. ISBN 9782070197385, OCLC 993029287
- Scherbius (et moi), éditions Gallimard, 2018. ISBN 9782072791673, OCLC 5086099961

Works in English

- The Missing Piece Orlando : Harcourt, 2003, ISBN 9780156013376, OCLC 52030354
- The Falsifiers (e-book only)
- The Pathfinders (e-book only)
- The Showrunners (e-book only)
- The Disappearance of Émilie Brunet (e-book only)
- An American Novel (e-book only)
- Ada (e-book only)
- The Man Who Vanished (e-book only)

Translations from English to French

- Du rififi à Wall Street, Vlad Eisinger, éditions Gallimard, 2020 ISBN 9782072859441, OCLC 1150848076

== Decorations and awards ==
- Young Leader of the French-American Foundation (2009)
- Prix France-Culture/Telerama for Les Éclaireurs (The Pathfinders) (2009).
- Chevalier of the Order of Arts and Letters (2015)
- Prix Version Femina for L'homme qui s'envola (2017).
- Prix Charles Brisset, awarded by the French Association of Psychiatry, for Scherbius (and me) (2018).
