= Michelle Schuller =

French writer

Michelle Schuller (born 1947) is a French writer, laureate of the 1991 Prix des libraires.

== Works ==
- 1990: Une femme qui ne disait rien, Presses de la Renaissance, ISBN 2-85616-585-0 - Prix des libraires the following year
- 1992: La Nuit sauvage Le Livre de Poche, ISBN 978-2253137801
- 1993: Ciel bleu, terre noire, Éditions Belfond, ISBN 2714431089
- 1996: Transgression, livre d’artiste, linogravures by Sotiris Barounas, texts by Michelle Schuller, preface by Gérard Georges Lemaire, Éditions Éric Koehler
- 2005: Soi et les autres : étude des relations familiales dans les écrits privés florentins des XIVe-XVe siècles, thèse de doctorat de POIDEVIN SCHULLER Michell, ISBN 9782729567736
