= Véronique Ovaldé =

French novelist (born 1972)

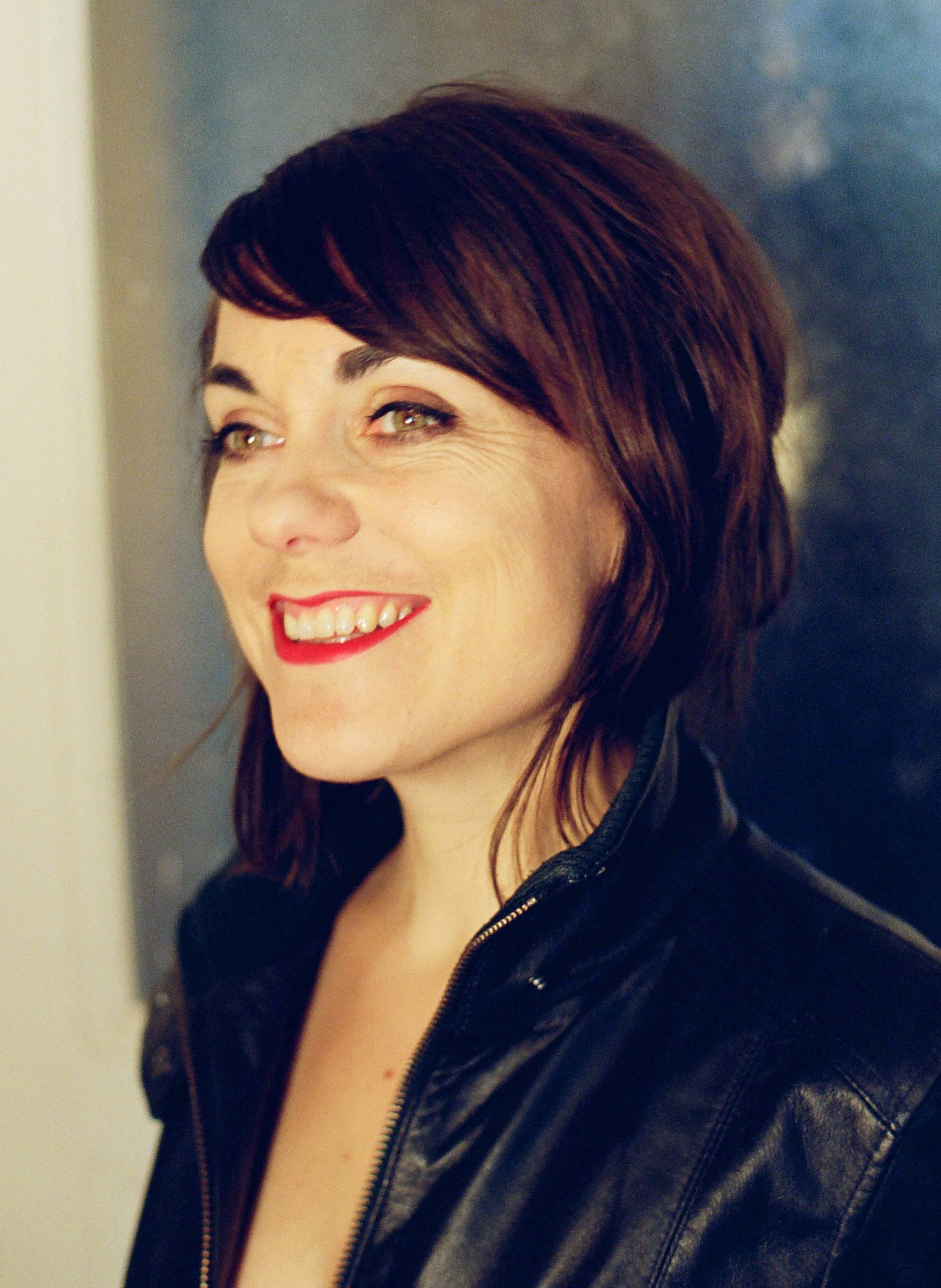
Véronique Ovaldé

Véronique Ovaldé (born 1972) is a French novelist. Her fifth novel Et mon cœur transparent won the Prix France Culture/Télérama in 2008. Her seventh novel Ce que je sais de Vera Candida won the Prix Renaudot des lycéens (2009), the Prix France Télévisions (2009) and the Grand prix des lectrices de Elle (2010). She has had two books translated into English by Adriana Hunter, but Ovaldé's other titles are still available for interested publishers and translators. In 2024, she published A nos vies imparfaites which received the Prix Goncourt de la nouvelle.

She lives in Paris.

== Works ==
- 2000: Le Sommeil des poissons, Éditions du Seuil
- 2002: Toutes choses scintillant, L'Ampoule,
- 2003: Les hommes en général me plaisent beaucoup, Actes Sud, J'ai lu, 2006
- 2005: Déloger l'animal, Actes Sud (Translated by Adrian Hunter as Kick Out the Animal)
- 2006: La Très Petite Zébuline with Joëlle Jolivet, Actes Sud junior
- 2008: Et mon cœur transparent, éditions de l'Olivier (Translated by Adrian Hunter as And My See-Through Heart)
  - Prix France Culture/Télérama 2008
- 2009: Ce que je sais de Vera Candida, éditions de l'Olivier
  - Prix Renaudot des Lycéens 2009
  - Prix France Télévisions 2009
  - Grand prix des lectrices de Elle 2010
- 2009: La Salle de bains du Titanic, recueil de nouvelles hors-commerce, J'ai Lu.
- 2011: Des vies d'oiseaux, éditions de l'Olivier
- 2012: La Salle de bains du Titanic, recueil de nouvelles, édition augmentée et illustrée, J'ai Lu.
- 2013: La Grâce des brigands, éditions de l'Olivier
- 2015: Paloma et le vaste monde, with Jeanne Detallante, Actes Sud junior
  - Pépite du livre 2015, Catégorie Album (Salon du livre et de la presse jeunesse de Montreuil)
- 2015: Quatre cœurs imparfaits, with Véronique Dorey, Éditions Thierry Magnier
- 2016: Soyez imprudents les enfants, Flammarion
- 2017: A cause de la vie, with Joann Sfar, Flammarion
- 2019: Personne n'a peur des gens qui sourient, Flammarion
- 2023: Fille en colère sur un banc de pierre, Flammarion
- 2024: À nos vies imparfaites, Flammarion
  - Prix Goncourt de la nouvelle 2024
