= Joseph Ponthus =

French writer (1978–2021)

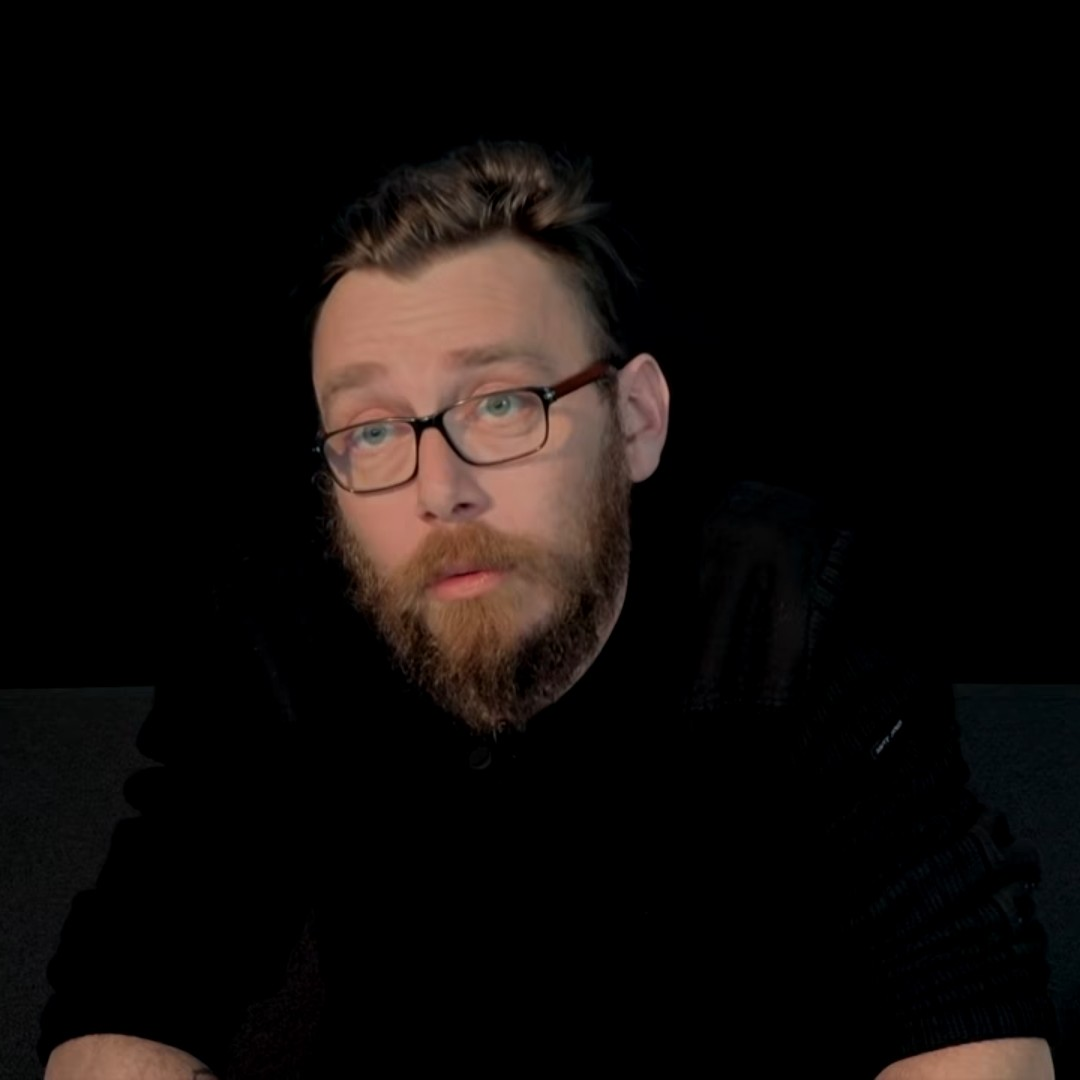
- Born: 1978; Reims, France
- Died: 24 February 2021 (aged 42–43)
- Occupation: Writer

Joseph Ponthus (1978 – 24 February 2021) was a French writer. He was best known for writing the book À la ligne, which received the Grand prix RTL-Lire and the Prix Eugène-Dabit du roman populiste.

== Biography ==
Ponthus earned his khâgne in Reims and Nancy. He first worked in the town hall of Nanterre as a special education teacher. He co-authored a book with four of his students in 2012, titled Nous ... la cité and published by La Découverte. In 2015, he moved to Lorient to live with his wife, where he first worked in a fish cannery and a slaughterhouse.

For two years, Ponthus recorded his impressions and feelings as well as those of his colleagues. These recordings were published in January 2019 under the title À la ligne by Éditions de la Table ronde. The English version of this book, On the Line: Notes from a factory, translated by Stephanie Smee, was published by Black Inc. in 2021. The book followed a flow of free verse poetry and has been considered a key example of factory composition, showing how "poetic language can spark collective awakening and resistance to dehumanizing conditions". He explained that "the plant [...] has set the pace: on a production line, everything is linked very quickly. There is no time for pretty subordinates. The gestures are mechanical and the thoughts go to line". It was well received by critics, and journalist François Busnel added it to his list of favorite reads on 6 February 2019 on the radio show La Grande Librairie. In March 2019, the book received the Grand prix RTL-Lire. A few weeks later, it was awarded the Prix Régine-Deforges, the Prix Jean Amila-Meckert, and the Prix du premier roman par les lecteurs des bibliothèques de la Ville de Paris. In November 2019, it received the Prix Eugène-Dabit du roman populiste, and the Prix littéraire des étudiants de Sciences Po in June 2020. Even before these awards, the book received much success from bookstores.

Joseph Ponthus died of cancer on 24 February 2021 at the age of 42.

== Works ==
- Nous ... la cité (2012)
- À la ligne (2019)
