= Yannick Grannec =

French writer

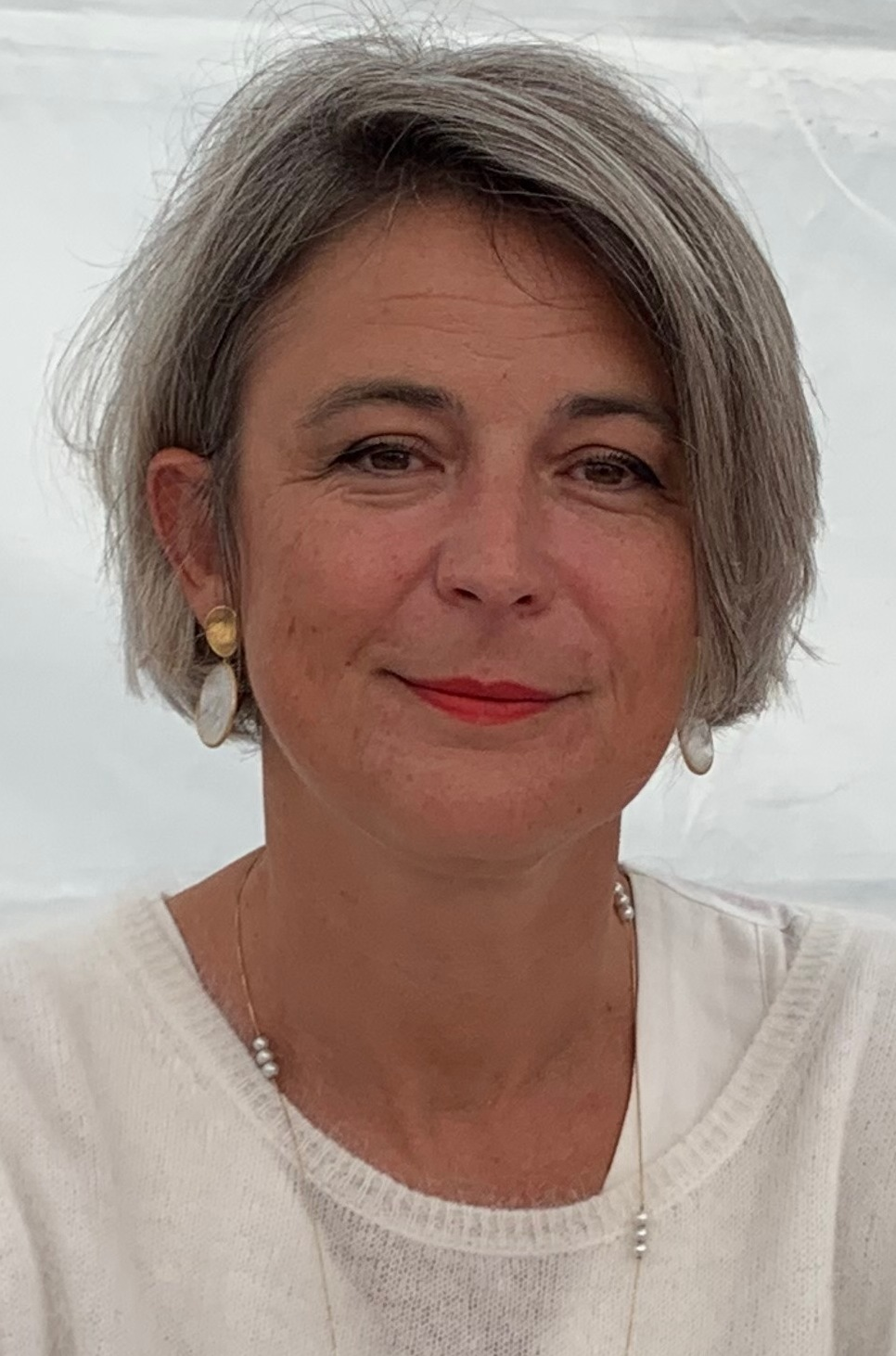
Yannick Grannec (2019)

Yannick Grannec is a 21st-century French writer whose first novel La Déesse des petites victoires published 28 December 2012 at éditions Anne Carrière, in Paris, received the 2013 prix des libraires.

== Biography ==
Born in 1969 and graduated from the ENSCI, Grannec worked as a graphic designer and published books for young people, including: Bleus, Rouges, Jaunes, Verts, and children's albums published in October 2003 by Didier, in the "Mirliton" series.

Installed at Saint-Paul-de-Vence, she devoted herself to writing. Her passion for mathematics led her to write the novel of the life of the brilliant Austrian mathematician Kurt Gödel told by his widow, Adele, in La Déesse des petites victoires.

The novel was a major success in the press and was crowned by the Prix des libraires in March 2013. It was published in éditions Pocket in January 2014
