= Élisabeth Filhol =

French writer

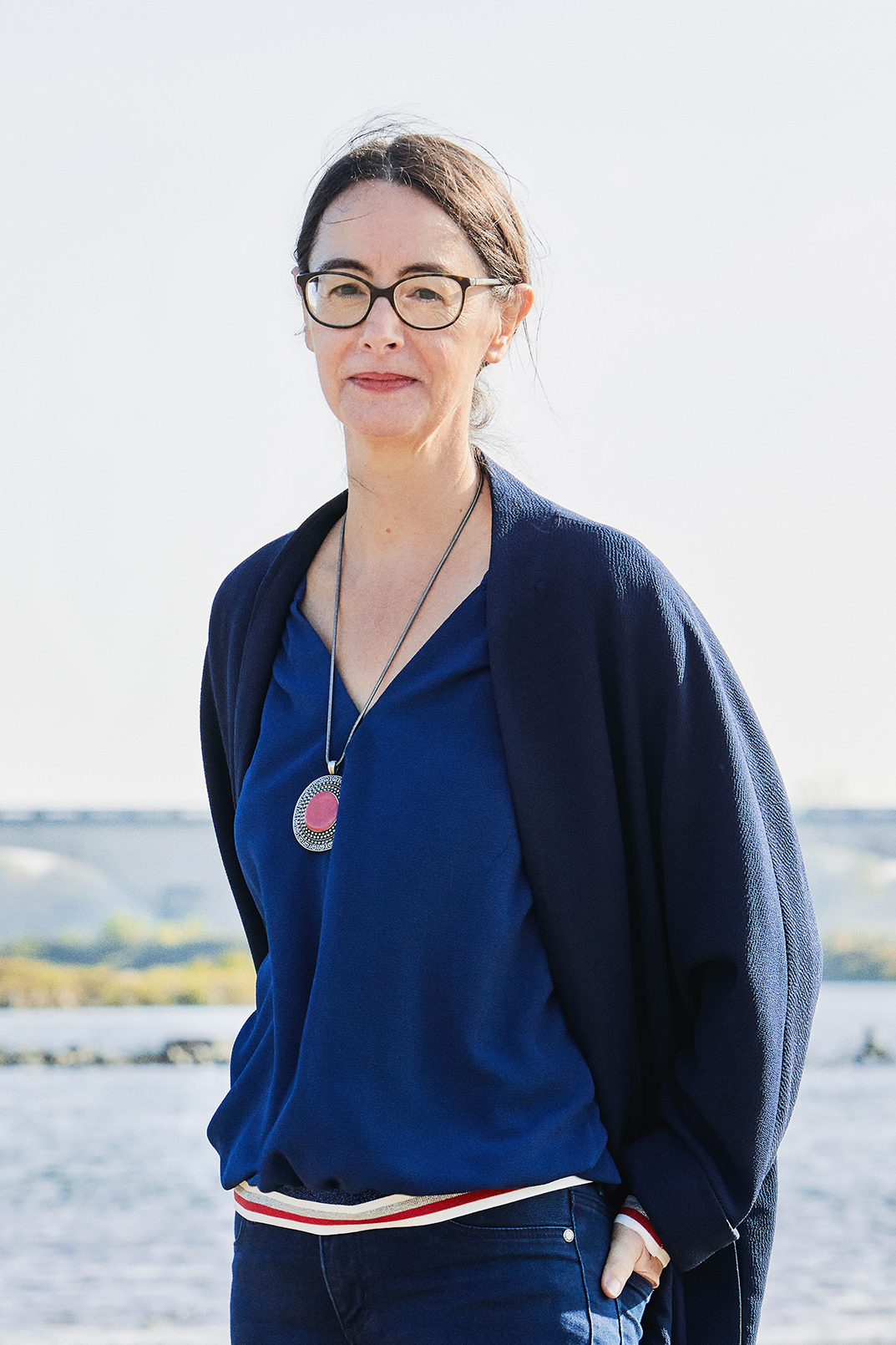
Élisabeth Filhol in 2003

Élisabeth Filhol (born 1 May 1965 in Mende, Lozère) is a French writer.

== Biography ==
Filhol works in the world of management and in particular in consulting works councils. She lives in the region of Angers. Her first novel La Centrale focuses on the working conditions of the temporary workers of the nuclear industry, and particularly the nuclear plants of Chinon and le Blayais. For this later novel, she won the 2010 Prix France Culture/Télérama.

== Work ==
- 2010: La Centrale. Éditions P.O.L. ISBN 978-2-84682-342-5.
- 2014: Bois II, Paris, Éditions P.O.L, 272 p. ISBN 978-2-8180-2045-6
- 2019: Doggerland, Éditions P.O.L, 2019 ISBN 978-2-8180-4625-8
- Sister-ship, Éditions P.O.L, 2024 ISBN 978-2-8180-6163-3
