= Anne Godard =

French writer

Anne Godard (born December 1971 in Paris) is a French writer.

== Works ==
- 2006 : L'Inconsolable, Paris, Éditions de Minuit, ISBN 2-7073-1940-6, Grand prix RTL-Lire
