= Juliette Arnaud =

Juliette Arnaud (born March 6, 1973) is a French actress, screenwriter, radio and television host.

Following the sacking of her France Inter co-host Guillaume Meurice from the weekly radio show Le Grand Dimanche Soir, she co-founded the radio show La Dernière alongside her former colleagues Meurice, Pierre-Emmanuel Barré, and Aymeric Lompret which is broadcast since 2024 on Radio Nova.
