= Virginie Deloffre =

French writer and physician

Virginie Deloffre is a French writer and physician who won the 2012 Prix des libraires for her first novel Léna.

== Biography ==
Virginie Deloffre is a physician in Paris in a hospital and took seven years to write Lena, a first novel which "takes us into the Great Siberian North to meet the Russian soul during the troubled times of the Perestroika".

== Works ==
- 2011: Léna, Albin Michel, ISBN 9782226229700
