= I Wish Someone Were Waiting for Me Somewhere =

- First French edition
- Author: Anna Gavalda
- Original title: Je voudrais que quelqu'un m'attende quelque part
- Translator: Karen L. Marker
- Language: French
- Genre: Short stories
- Published: 1999 in French; 2003 in English
- Pages: 208
- Awards: Grand prix RTL-Lire (2000)
- ISBN: 9781101215647

I Wish Someone Were Waiting for Me Somewhere (French: Je voudrais que quelqu'un m'attende quelque part) is a collection of twelve short stories written by Anna Gavalda.

It was written in French and published in 1999. It is the first book published by Anna Gavalda and it was awarded the Prix Contrepoint in 2001.

== Reception ==
I Wish Someone Were Waiting for Me Somewhere was first published in 1999 under the title Je voudrais que quelqu'un m'attende quelque part that met with both critical acclaim and commercial success, selling more than three-quarters of a million copies in her native France and winning the 2000 Grand prix RTL-Lire.

"Her books have both wit and a whimsical charm" (The Sunday Telegraph).

== Adaptation ==
=== Film ===
- 2019: I Wish Someone Were Waiting for Me Somewhere by Arnaud Viard.

== See also ==
- 1999 in literature
- Contemporary French literature
