= Ryan Daniel Dobson =

American film director

- Born: Ryan Daniel Dobson; December 31, 1980 (age 44); Fort Collins, Colorado, US
- Other names: Ryan Dobson
- Occupation: Actor
- Years active: 2008–present

Ryan Daniel Dobson (born December 31, 1980) is a writer, actor, photographer and director. His work includes the feature film Hosea several short films including The Romantics, and the podcast The Thicket.

== Biography ==
Ryan Daniel Dobson was born in Colorado, where he graduated from Monte Vista High School in 1999. He then went on to graduate from Southern Nazarene University in Oklahoma City with a degree in Theology. He worked the following two years at Casady School in Oklahoma City as Chaplain with Father John Henry Marlin. Ryan moved to Los Angeles in October 2005 to begin his film and television career where he continues to live and work with his wife Sarah Elizabeth Dobson and two children.

== Career ==
Ryan wrote and directed the feature film Hosea (2019), a modern retelling of the Biblical narrative through the eyes of the lesser-known character of the prophet's spouse.

Ryan wrote, directed, and acted in the short film The Romantics (2014), which pits two lovers against each other in ever-increasing self-imposed dares of kitschy romance. The film appeared in the Woods Hole Film Festival, winning the Audience Award for Best Comedy.

Ryan wrote and co-directed (with Patrick Cavanaugh) the short film Prattle (2011), about two competitive and egotistical friends who make a bet to see which can meet, and successfully propose to, a woman online. The film appeared in the Napa Valley Film Festival, Bel Air Film Festival, Manhattan Film Festival and Cambridge Film Festival, as well as on Virgin Atlantic.

Ryan has co-starred on The Protector (2011), Castle (2010), How I Met Your Mother (2010) and The Game (2009). His film acting career includes supporting roles in The Trivial Pursuits of Arthur Banks (2011) and The Order of Chaos (2010). Early in his acting career he was involved in Oklahoma City's Shakespeare productions.
