= Trading Secrets =

1998 novel by Paule Constant

- Author: Paule Constant
- Original title: Confidence pour confidence
- Language: French
- Publisher: Éditions Gallimard
- Publication date: 2 April 1998
- Publication place: France
- Pages: 233
- ISBN: 2-07-075231-3

Trading Secrets (French: Confidence pour confidence) is a 1998 novel by the French writer Paule Constant. It received the Prix Goncourt.

== See also ==
- 1998 in literature
- Contemporary French literature
