= Léonor de Récondo =

French violinist and writer (born 1976)

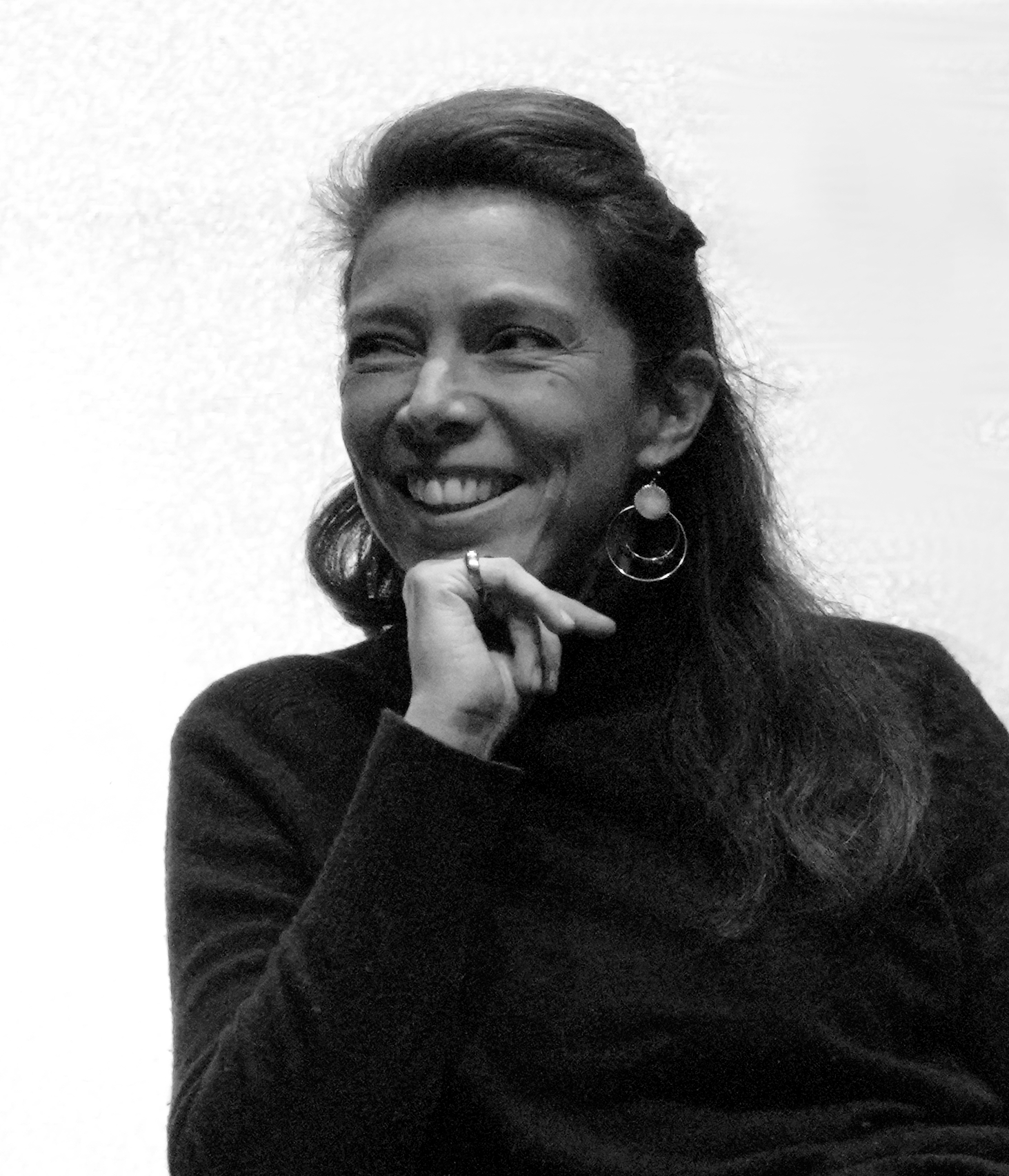
Léonor de Récondo (2025)

Léonor de Récondo (born 10 August 1976) is a French violinist and writer.

== Biography ==
Léonor de Récondo started to learn the violon at age five. She became a baroque violinist, and was a laureate of the international competition of baroque music Van Wassenaer (Netherland) in 2004.

Léonor de Récondo began a career as a writer in 2010 by publishing her first novel, La Grace du cyprès blanc. In 2013, following the publication of her novel Rêves oubliés, she was awarded the Prix littéraire des lycéens et apprentis de Bourgogne.

In 2015, she was awarded the prix des libraires, the Grand prix RTL-Lire. and the following year, the Prix des étudiants francophones, depending on the Young Europeans Literary Award. for her novel Amours.

== Literary work ==
- 2010: La Grâce du cyprès blanc, Cognac, France, Éditions Le Temps qu'il fait 103 p. ISBN 978-2-86853-546-7
- 2012: Rêves oubliés, Paris, Sabine Wespieser éditeur, 169 p. ISBN 978-2-84805-107-9. (lauréat du Prix littéraire des lycéens et apprentis de Bourgogne en 2013)
- 2013: Pietra viva, Paris, Sabine Wespieser Éditeur, 225 p. ISBN 978-2-84805-152-9 - book devoted to Michel-Ange.
- 2015: Amours, Paris, Sabine Wespieser Éditeur, 279 p. ISBN 978-2-84805-173-4. Prix des libraires 2015 - Grand prix RTL-Lire 2015. - Prix des étudiants francophones 2016, depending on the Young Europeans Literary Award.
