= Olivier Bourdeaut =

French contemporary writer (born 1980)

Olivier Bourdeaut (born 1980 in Nantes, Loire-Atlantique) is a French contemporary writer.

His first novel, Waiting for Bojangles (En attendant Bojangles), published in January 2016 at Éditions Finitude, was awarded the 2016 Prix France Culture/Télérama, the 2016 Grand prix RTL-Lire, the 2016 Prix Emmanuel Roblès and the 2016 Prix France Télévisions.

== Biography ==
Olivier Bourdeaut was a real estate agent in Nantes when the loss of his work led him to devote himself to literature. He worked for two years writing a first novel, dark, which however found no publisher. While residing with his parents in Spain he devoted himself to the writing, in seven weeks, of another light and wacky novel that would become En attendant Bojangles. Published by éditions Finitude, the first to acquire its rights, the book received the enthusiastic support of Jérôme Garcin in Le Nouvel Observateur, and immediately met an enormous success with the public.

== Work ==
- 2016: En attendant Bojangles. Éditions Finitude. p. 160. ISBN 978-2-36339-063-9.
  - 2019: Waiting for Bojangles. Simon & Schuster. p. 176. ISBN 9781501145919.
- 2018: Pactum salis. Éditions Finitude. p. 256. ISBN 978-2-36339-090-5.
- 2021: Florida. Éditions Finitude. p. 256. ISBN 978-2-36339-146-9.
