= Paule Constant =

French writer (born 1944)

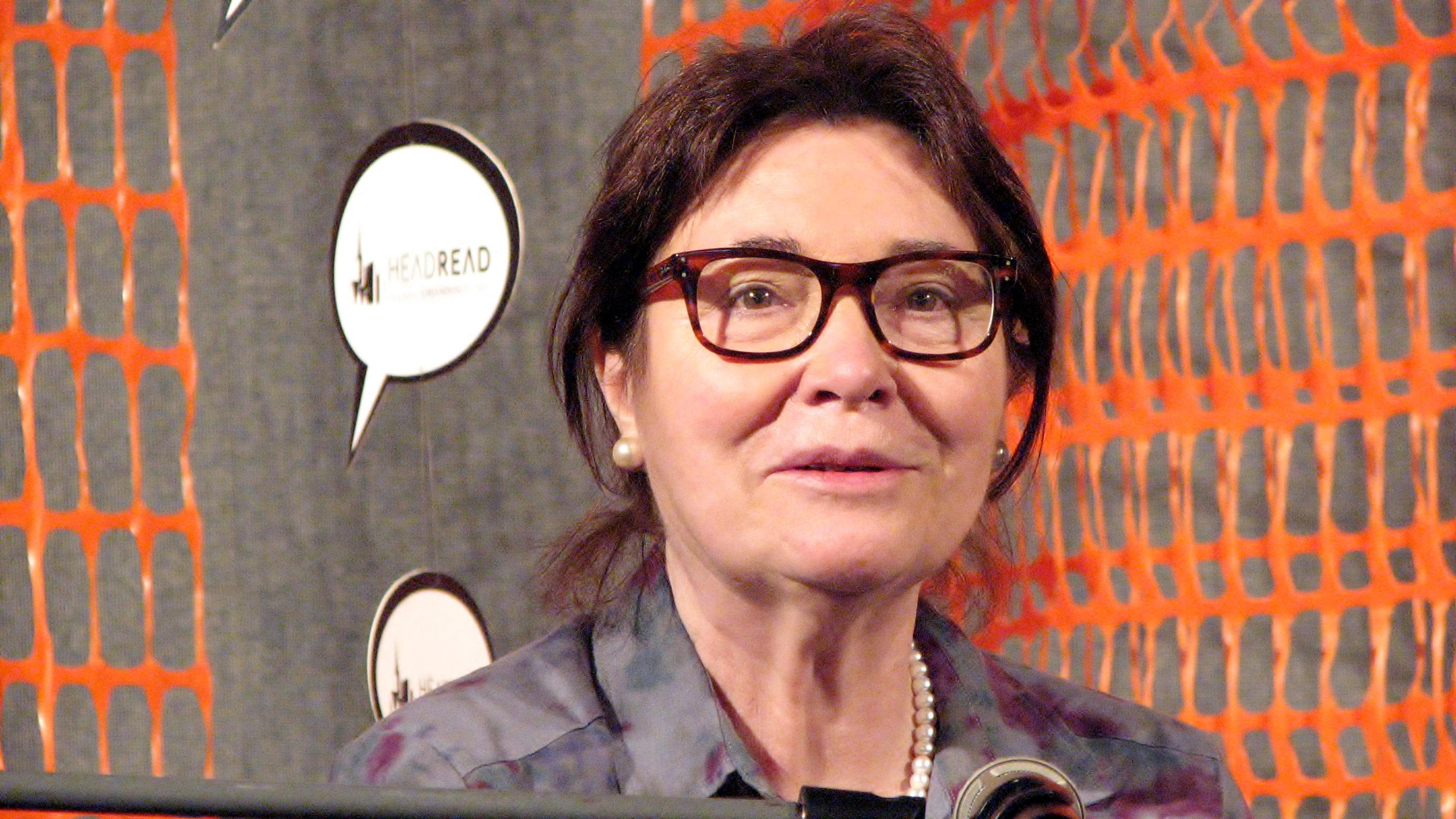
Paule Constant in 2012.

Paule Constant (born 25 January 1944 in Gan, Pyrénées-Atlantiques) is a French novelist.

She graduated from Paris-Sorbonne University, with a Ph.D.

== Awards ==
- 1998 Prix Goncourt for Confidence pour confidence.
- 1989 Grand prize for the novel Académie française

== Works ==
=== English translations ===
- The governor's daughter. Translated by Betsy Wing. University of Nebraska Press. 1998. ISBN 978-0-8032-6385-7.
- Trading Secrets. Translated by Betsy Wing. University of Nebraska Press. 2001. ISBN 978-0-8032-6404-5.
- Ouregano: a novel. Translated by Margot Miller. Lexington Books. 2005. ISBN 978-0-7391-1066-9.
- White spirit. Translated by Betsy Wing. University of Nebraska Press. 2006. ISBN 978-0-8032-1535-1.

=== Novels ===
- Ouregano, 1980, Gallimard
- Propriété privée, 1981, Gallimard
- Balta, 1983, Gallimard
- Un monde à l'usage des demoiselles, 1987, Gallimard
- White Spirit, 1989, Gallimard
- Le Grand Ghâpal, 1991, Gallimard - Prix Jackie Bouquin
- La Fille du Gobernator, 1994, Gallimard ISBN 978-2-07-073976-9
- Confidence pour confidence, 1998, Gallimard, ISBN 978-2-07-075231-7
- Sucre et secret, 2003, Gallimard, ISBN 978-2-07-031640-3
- La bête à chagrin: roman, 2007, Gallimard, ISBN 978-2-07-078311-3

=== Television documentaries ===
- for Arte : l'Education des Jeunes Filles de la Légion d'Honneur (1992);
- for La 5 : in the series Mon héros préféré: "la Princesse de Clèves" (1996);
- for France 2 : in the series Les grands fleuves racontés par des écrivains: "L'Amazone" (1997);
- for La 5 : - in the series Galilée : "Paule Constant sur les traces de Jean Giono" (2001).
