= Gaëlle Nohant =

French writer

Gaëlle Nohant (born 1973 in Paris) is a French writer. She lives in Lyon. She has written several novels, including:

- L’Ancre des rêves (winner of the prix Encre Marine, 2007)
- La Part des flammes (winner of the prix France Bleu/Page des libraires, 2015 and the prix du Livre de Poche, 2016)
- Légende d’un dormeur éveillé (2017)

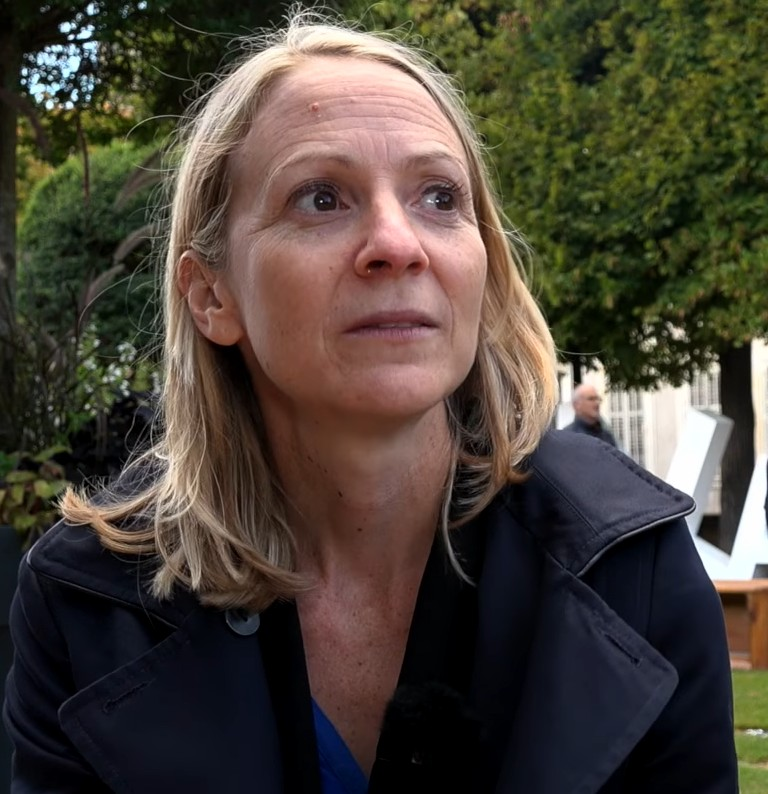
Gaëlle Nohant during an interview with the Mollat bookstore
