= Claude Michelet =

French writer (1938–2022)

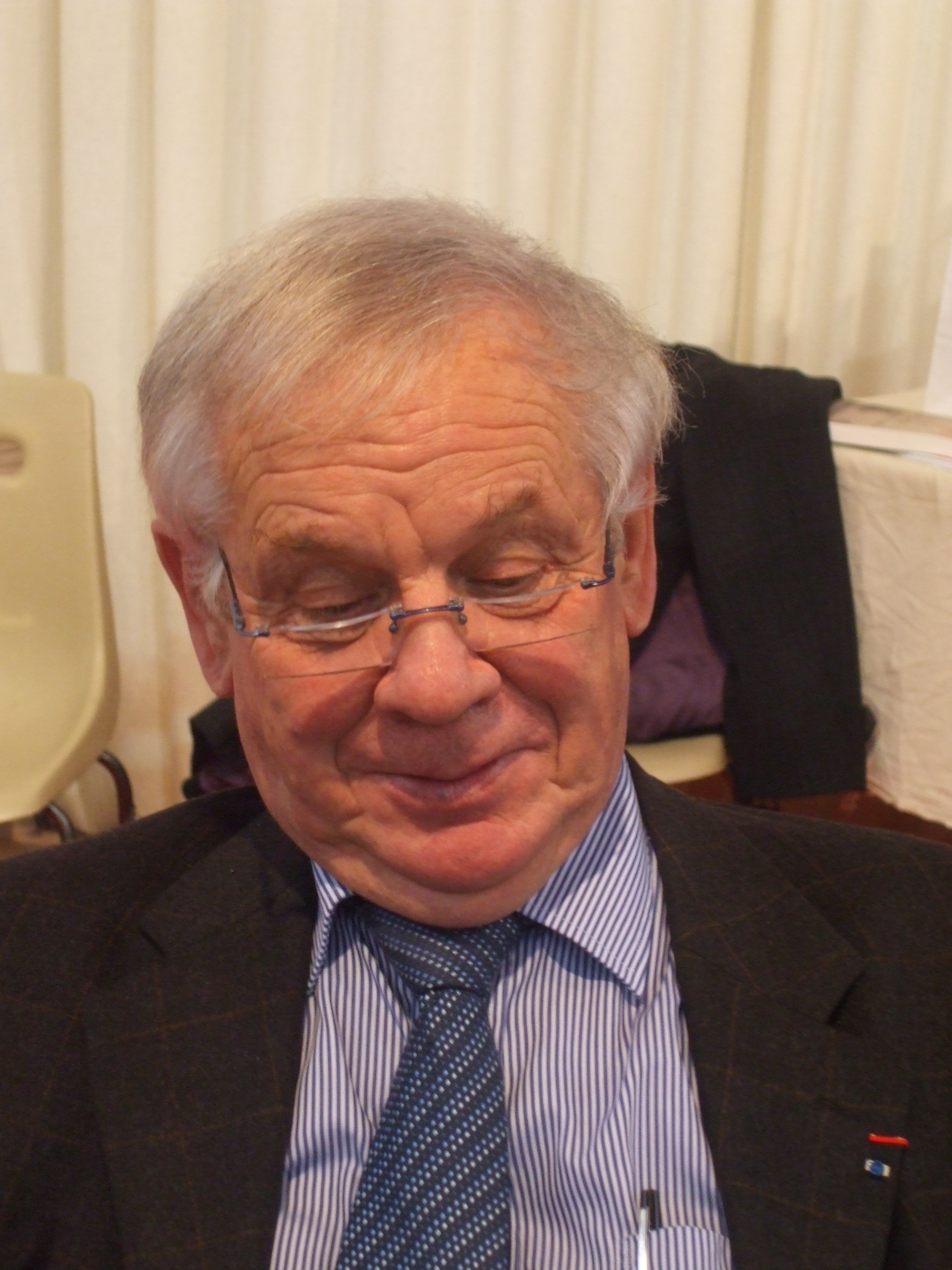
- Born: 30 May 1938; Brive-la-Gaillarde, France
- Died: 26 May 2022 (aged 83); Brive-la-Gaillarde, France
- Occupation(s): Author, writer
- Awards: National Order of the Legion of Honour; National Order of Merit

Claude Michelet (30 May 1938 – 26 May 2022) was an award-winning French author and film writer.

== Biography ==
Michelet, the son of the French politician Edmond Michelet, was born in Brive-la-Gaillarde, France and his first novel "La Terre qui demeure" was released in 1965.

He died on 26 May 2022 at the age of 83 at his home in the hamlet of Marcillac.

== Awards and honors ==
- 1972 Prix des écrivains combattants for Mon père Edmond Michelet
- 1975 Prix des Volcans for J’ai choisi la terre
- 1979 Prix Eugène Le Roy for Des grives aux loups
- 1984 Prix Paulée de Meursault
- Knight of the National Order of the Legion of Honour
- Commander of the National Order of Merit
