= Anna Gavalda =

French novelist (born 1970)

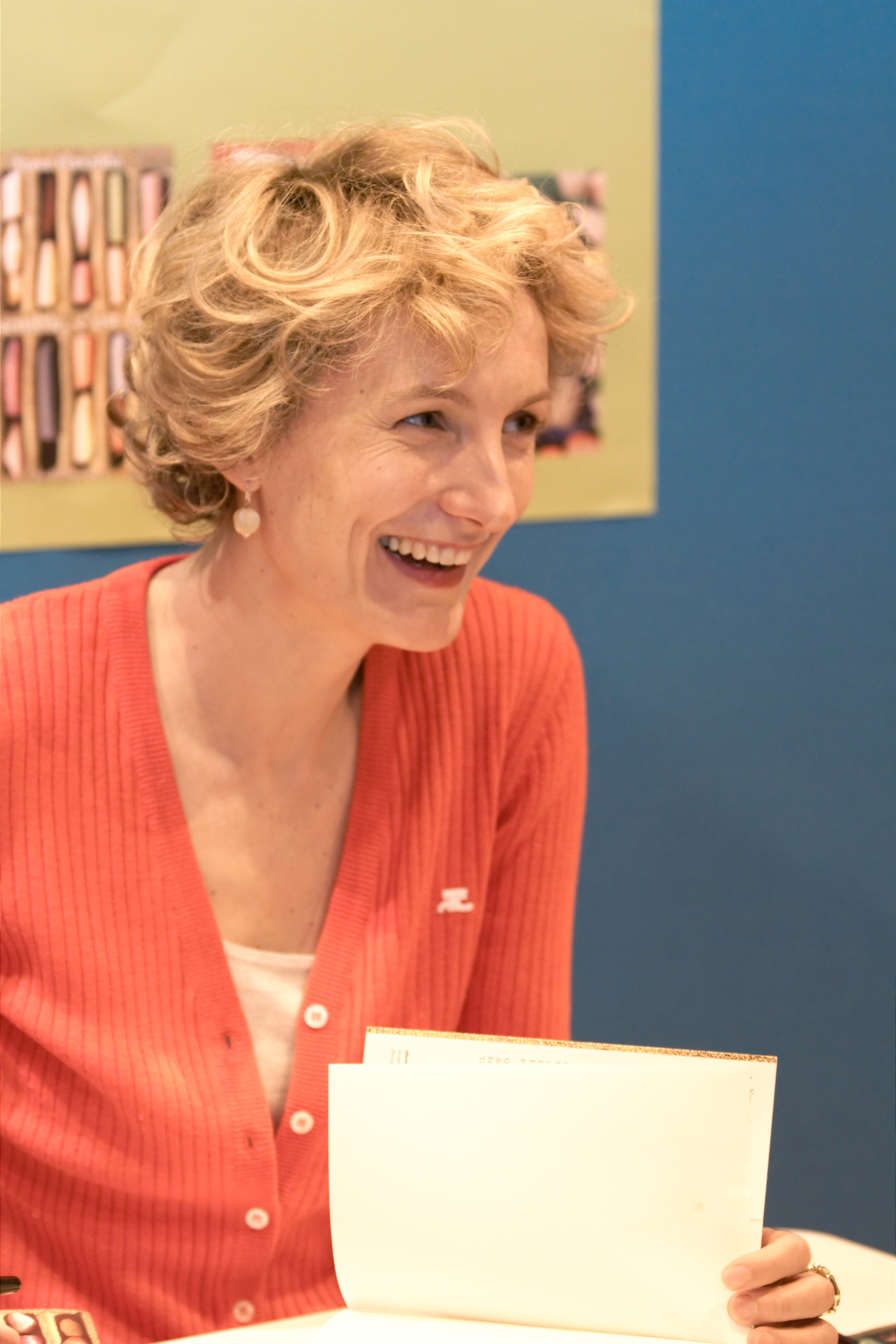
- Gavalda in 2010
- Born: 9 December 1970 (age 55); Boulogne-Billancourt, Hauts-de-Seine, France
- Occupation: Author
- Children: 2
- Writing career
- Genres: Novel, short stories
- Notable work: Hunting and Gathering
- Notable awards: Grand prix RTL-Lire

Anna Gavalda (born 9 December 1970 in Boulogne-Billancourt, Hauts-de-Seine) is a French novelist.

== Biography ==
Referred to by Voici magazine as "a distant descendant of Dorothy Parker", Anna Gavalda was born in an upper-class suburb of Paris. She was working as a French teacher in high school when a collection of her short stories were first published in 1999 under the title Je voudrais que quelqu'un m'attende quelque part that met with both critical acclaim and commercial success, selling more than three-quarters of a million copies in her native France and winning the 2000 Grand prix RTL-Lire. The book was translated into numerous languages, including English, and sold in twenty-seven countries. It was published to acclaim in North America in 2003 as I Wish Someone Were Waiting for Me Somewhere. The book received much praise and is a library and school selection worldwide in several languages.

Gavalda's first novel, Je l'aimais (Someone I Loved) was published in France in February 2002 and later that year in English. Inspired by the failure of her own marriage, it too was a major literary success and a bestseller and was followed by the short (96 pages) young adult novel 35 kilos d'espoir (95 Pounds of Hope) that she said she wrote "to pay tribute to those of my students who were dunces in school but otherwise fantastic people".

In 2004, her third novel, Hunting and Gathering (Ensemble, c'est tout), focused on the lives of four people living in an apartment house: a struggling young artist who works as an office cleaner at night, a young aristocrat misfit, a cook, and an elderly grandmother. The 600-page book is a bestseller in France and has been translated into English as Hunting and Gathering.

As of 2007, her three books have sold more than 3 million copies in France. Hunting and Gathering was made into a film in 2007 by Claude Berri, with Audrey Tautou and Guillaume Canet. The adaptation of her first novel, Je l'aimais, with Daniel Auteuil and Marie-Josée Croze, was filmed in 2009 by Zabou Breitman.

She has also translated into French John William's novel Stoner.

In March 2018, Anna Gavalda appeared in the African media as one of the finalists of the Grand Prix of Literary Associations 2017. She was shortlisted in the Belles-Lettres Category for her collection of short stories entitled Fendre l'armure, that was released in 2017.

== Personal life ==
Divorced, and the mother of two, Gavalda lives in the city of Melun, Seine-et-Marne, about 50 km southeast of Paris. In addition to writing novels, she also contributes to Elle magazine.

== Works ==
- Je voudrais que quelqu'un m'attende quelque part (J'ai lu, 1999, ISBN 9782290311783)
- 35 kilos d'espoir (Alinea, 2002, ISBN 9788723908230)
- Je l'aimais (J'ai lu, 2002, ISBN 9782290340783)
- Ensemble, c'est tout (J'ai lu, 2005, ISBN 9782290343715)
- La Consolante (Editions, 2008, ISBN 9782290014288)
- L'Échappée belle (J'ai lu, 2009, ISBN 9782290040997)
- Billie (Europa Editions, 2013, ISBN 9781609452490)
- La vie en mieux (La dilettante, 2009, ISBN 9782842631840)
- Fendre l'armure (J'ai lu, 2017, ISBN 9782290155202)

== Works in English translation ==
- I Wish Someone Were Waiting for Me Somewhere (Penguin Putnam Inc., 2003, ISBN 9781573223553)
- 95 Pounds of Hope (Viking, 2003, ISBN 9780670036721)
- Someone I Loved (Penguin Putnam Inc., 2005, ISBN 9781594480416)
- Hunting and Gathering (Vintage Publishing, 2006, ISBN 9780099494072)
- Consolation (Vintage Publishing, 2009, ISBN 9780701183523)
- Breaking Away/French Leave (Gallic Books, 2011, ISBN 9781906040406)
- Billie (Europa Editions, 2015, ISBN 9781609452490)
- Life, Only Better (Europa Editions, 2015, ISBN 9781609452940)
- The Cracks in Our Armour (Europa Editions (UK) Ltd, 2019.ISBN 9781787701632)

== Film adaptations ==
- Hunting and Gathering, 2007.
- Someone I Loved, 2009.
