= Éric Reinhardt =

French writer and editor (born 1965)

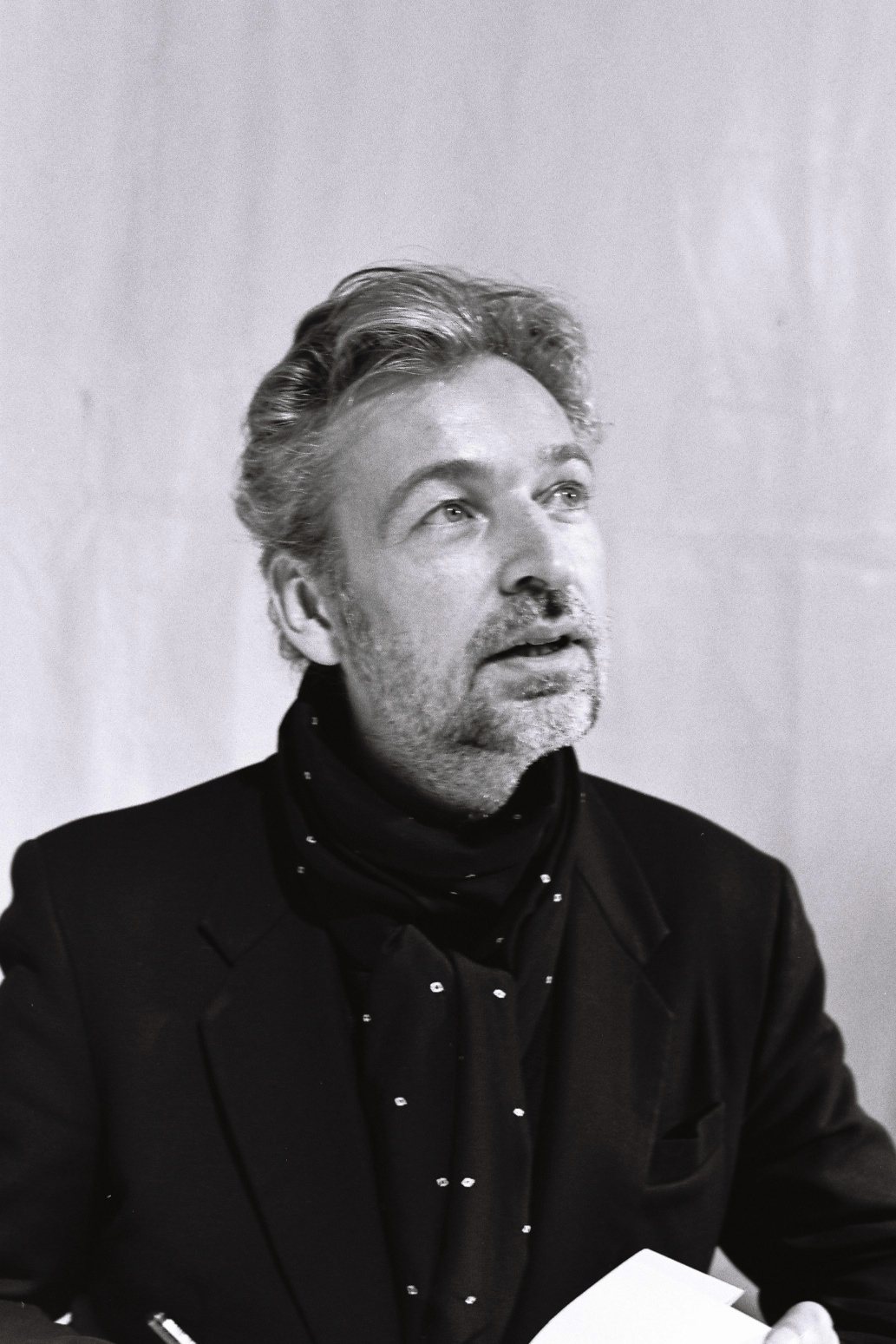
- Éric Reinhardt at the Radio France book fair, 26 November 2011
- Born: 2 April 1965 (age 61); Nancy, France
- Occupations: Writer, publisher
- Writing career
- Notable awards: Globe de Cristal d'honneur (2012)

Éric Reinhardt (born 2 April 1965) is a French writer and publisher currently living in Paris.

== Early life ==
Reinhardt grew up in a middle-class family approximately 30 kilometres from Paris in Corbeil-Essonnes. He attended preparatory classes in Paris at Collège-lycée Jacques-Decour before studying at ISG Business School with the aim of finding employment in the publishing world. At ISG he wrote a first-year thesis on the publishing committee at Gallimard and a thesis on Éditions P.O.L. Following the completion of his studies, Reinhardt commenced working in publishing before moving into publishing art books specifically. He worked at publishing houses Le Castor astral, Albin Michel, Flohic Éditions and Éditions Hazan.

== Novelist ==
Reinhardt began writing while working in publishing and published his first novel Demi-sommeil in 1998 with Actes-Sud. Demi-sommeil explored dealing with the loss of childhood and love. Le Moral des ménages, published in 2002 by Editions Stock is a critique of the middle class. Existence (2004), Cendrillon (2007) and Le Système Victoria (2011) continued in this vein, subjects covered included globalisation, world finance and the diktat of social achievement. L'Amour et les forêts (2014), Reinhardt's first novel published by Gallimard represented a change in topic to the world of the intimate in the spirit of Gustave Flaubert and Guy de Maupassant. Selling more than 100,000 copies, this novel won both Le Prix Renaudot des lycéens and Le Prix Roman France Télévisions in 2014.

A blend of truth and fiction, La Chambre des époux (2017) covered his wife's experience with breast cancer and his fear of losing her. Comédies françaises (2020) is a novel based on real events about the development of the internet and the impact of lobbyist Ambroise Roux who convinced Valery Giscard d'Estaing to halt French efforts based on the ideas of Louis Pouzin. Comédies françaises was nominated for the Prix littéraire du Monde, the Prix Interallié, the Prix Medicis and won the Prix Les Inrockuptibles ex aequo with Constance Debré's Love me tender.

== Bibliography ==
=== Novels ===
- Demi-sommeil, Actes-Sud, 1998, ISBN 2-7427-1849-4
- Le Moral des ménages, Stock, 2002, ISBN 9782234054615
- Existence, Stock, 2004, ISBN 9782234057098
- Cendrillon, Stock, 2007, ISBN 9782234058149
- Le Système Victoria, Stock, 2011, ISBN 9782234061903
- L’amour et les forêts, Gallimard, 2014, ISBN 9782070143979
- La Chambre des époux, Gallimard, 2017, ISBN 9782070197200
- Comédies françaises, Gallimard, 2020, ISBN 9782072796982
- Sarah, Susanne et l'écrivain, Gallimard, 2023

=== Theatre ===
- Leverage de quatre in L'Argent, Avant-Scène, 2009, ISBN 9782749811345
- Élisabeth ou l'Équité, Stock, 2013, ISBN 9782234074002
