= Société de Lecture =

Private non-profit association of public utility founded in Geneva in 1818

Société de Lecture of Geneva
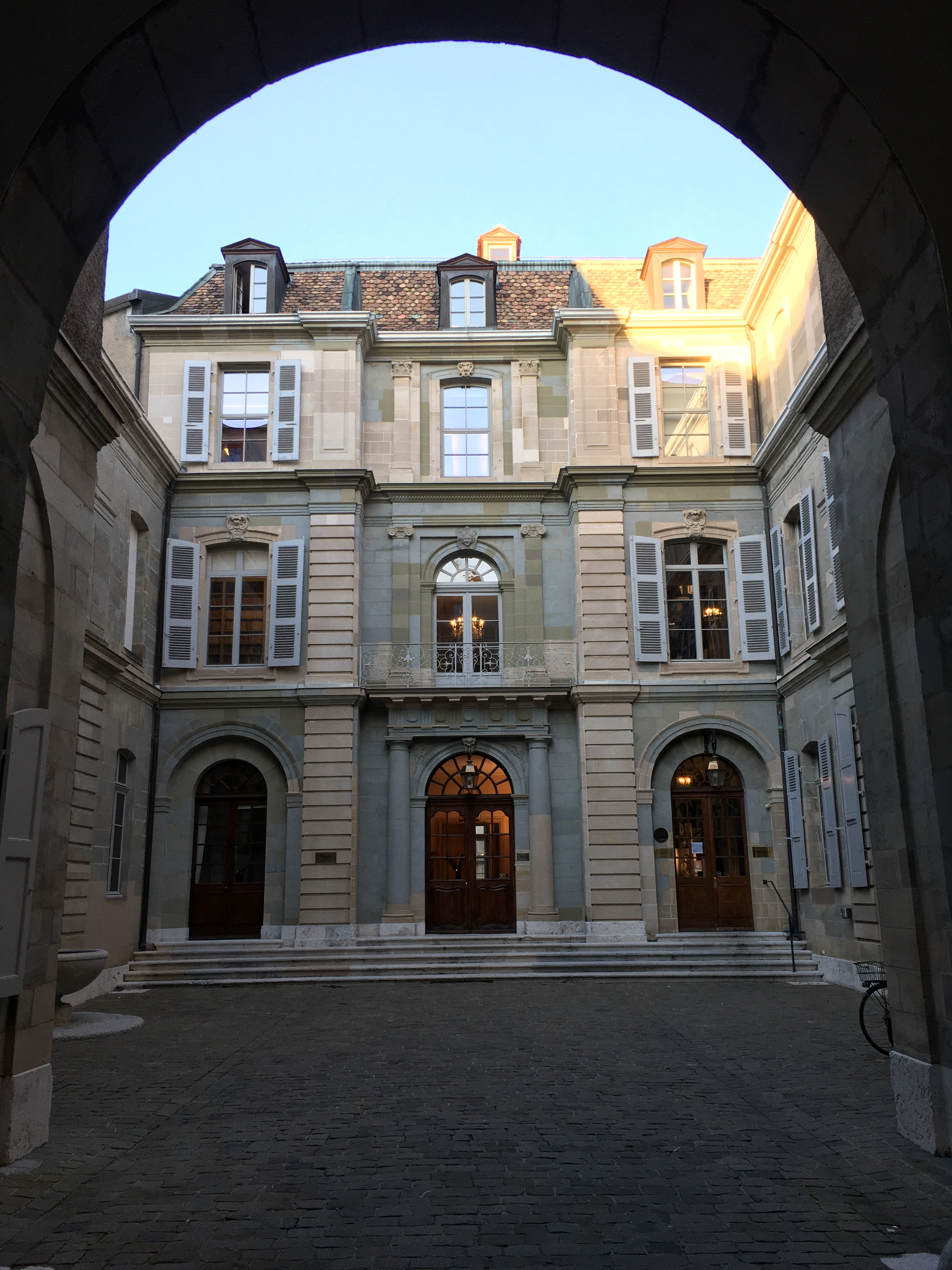
- Location: 11 Grand-Rue, Geneva,, Switzerland
- Established: 1818

Collection
- Size: 200,000

Other information
- Website: Official website

The Société de Lecture of Geneva is a private non-profit association founded in 1818. Over the last two centuries, it has preserved and developed an encyclopaedic library of 200,000 volumes. It is an active cultural centre of European renown (Prix Europa Nostra in 2020). Located in the heart of the old town of Geneva, the Société de Lecture was originally an exclusive meeting place for scholars. Nowadays, it is no longer the "salon de conversation" of Geneva's patrician society, as it was during the Restoration, nor, the thinktank of political refugees and would-be revolutionaries as it was at the beginning of the nineteenth century. Today, it is a place of exchange, research, conferences and learning open to the public, mainly in the fields of literature, as well as music, science, geopolitics, history and the fine arts. In 1947, the novelist Robert de Traz defined it as "a haven of grace for the body and the mind, a flight path for the imagination, a kind of intellectual hammam, a fabulous cave where the treasures of literature accumulate".

== History ==
=== Creation ===
Under the impetus of John Calvin, from the Reformation onwards, Geneva became a city of theologians, lawyers, humanists and printers. Its fame extended far beyond its walls. Two centuries later, the influence of the Age of the Enlightenment gave Geneva's scholars an encyclopaedic desire to learn and exchange everything.

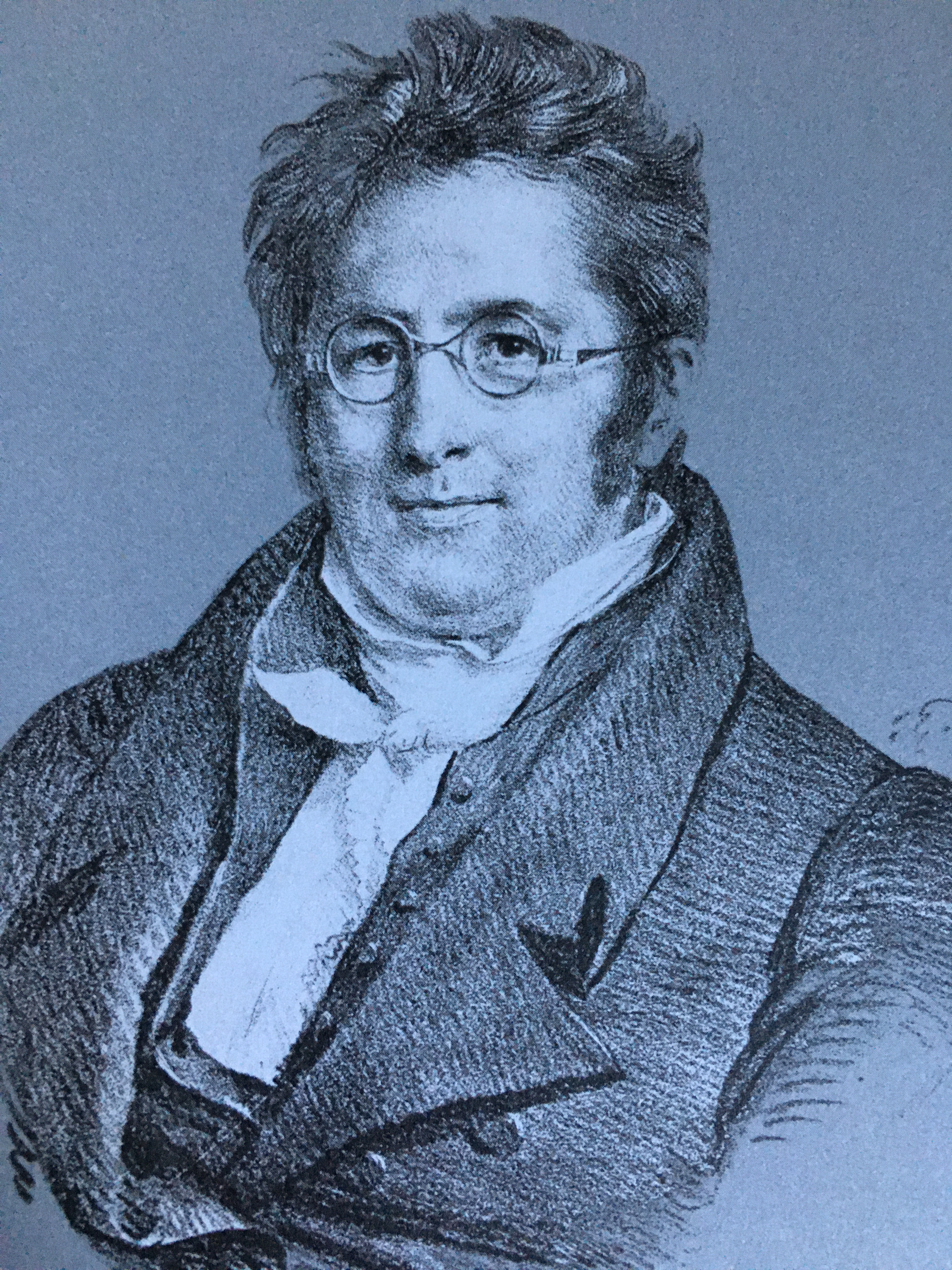
Augustin-Pyramus de Candolle, co-founder of the Société de Lecture

The tensions arising from the revolutionary unrest and the French occupation under Napoleon in 1798 drove the well-born sons of wealthy families from Geneva into exile and to the discovery of Europe. After fifteen years of French annexation, this republican aristocracy returned. They wanted to create a literary society like those that existed elsewhere, in order to share knowledge, ideals, and reading. Geneva regained its independence in 1813 and joined the Swiss Confederation in 1815. It then became a city of scientists, men of letters, and artists.

The Société de Lecture was founded in April 1818, under the patronage of botanist Augustin-Pyramus de Candolle, a member of a hundred European academies. In his memoirs, the Genevan scientist reports that he was struck by the poverty of the Public Library of Geneva. In order to "bring the city's distinguished men closer together", he convinced his friends to bring together some of their collections and to build up, in a joint financial effort, a library commensurate with the needs of the many researchers and scholars in Geneva at that time. Professors from the Geneva Academy donated their book collections to the nascent institution. One of the aims of this society was also to receive the foreign press and scientific journals to make them available to its members in order to quench their thirst for information and academic knowledge after the French tutelage.

Candolle recounts in his Memoirs: "a few academic friends joined us and finally twelve people put themselves forward to create the institution. Some of them, chosen from among the richest in the city, undertook to bear the initial costs, others contributed to the success by their scientific and literary reputation". In addition to Candolle, the founders' Committee was made up of:

- Henri Boissier, professor of literature and archaeology and rector of the Geneva Academy (the future university).
- Étienne Dumont, jurist and collaborator in the Mirabeau atelier during the French Revolution.
- Jacob and François Duval, two brothers, jewellers, who had returned from Russia with great wealth.
- Jean-Gabriel Eynard, entrepreneur, financier, diplomat and philhellenist.
- Guillaume Fatio, State Councillor, deputy of the Federal Diet and future syndic (mayor).
- Guillaume Favre-Bertrand, heir of a Geneva shipowner dynasty and collector.
- Charles-Gaspard De la Rive, physician and professor of chemistry.
- Jean-Marc-Jules Pictet, magistrate and former representative of the Department of Lake Geneva.
- Marc-Auguste Pictet, professor of physics and astronomer, known, among other things, for not having left Geneva during the years of revolution between 1780 and 1794, unlike many of his contemporaries.
- William Saladin, owner of the Château de Crans, near Nyon.

The 12 founders of the Société de Lecture were not lacking in ambition: they all wanted to place Calvin's town among the first cities of knowledge and freedom. The departure of the French gave rise to a frenzy of projects to provide Geneva with a cultural offering of the highest level. They chose to set up their project in the former residence of the representative of France. It is a strong symbol: "occupying France" was thus becoming "occupied France".

These 12 men corresponded all the time. The slightest scientific breakthrough was brought to their attention. Erudition was their only religion. Unlike many other Geneva circles, there was no gambling or drinking at the Société de Lecture. However, playing chess was permitted. Nevertheless, success was immediate: after one year of existence, the Society had 225 members.

The initial objective of making up for the shortcomings of the Public Library of the time was quickly supported by the Geneva patriciate, which wished to offer itself a place of instruction, knowledge, and intellectual exchange. One of the strengths of the institution was that it was able to open up to the world and welcome foreigners, whether famous or not. The Société de Lecture thus became a discreet and sought-after meeting place. In 1835, for example, Louis-Napoléon Bonaparte, the future Napoléon III, met Count Camillo of Cavour, the future architect of Italian unity at the Société de Lecture.

Originally, the practice of member sponsorship led to the emergence of an identity specific to the Société de Lecture. In order to become a member, two members had to introduce the candidate to the committee. The Committee then decided whether or not the candidate was accepted. It was not until the mid-1970s that membership practices became more flexible. Today, anyone who pays the subscription (the equivalent of one Swiss franc a day) can become a member.

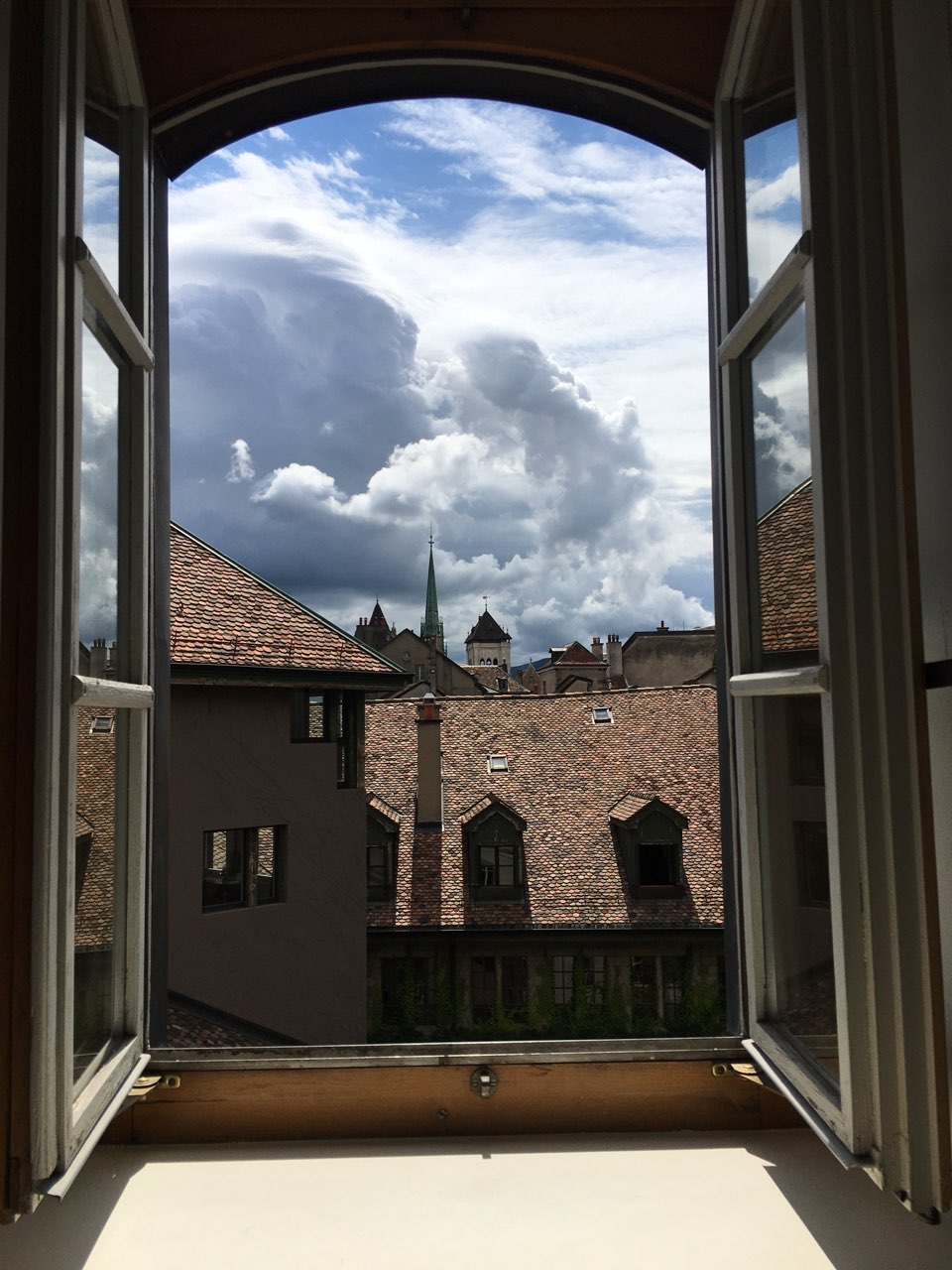
View from the library on St-Peter's cathedral of Geneva.

=== The "ladies' issue" ===
Women were not allowed to become members until the end of the 19th century. Initially, they were completely excluded. Then, from 1888 onwards, widows, sisters and daughters of deceased members were allowed to borrow books but not to sit in the salons, "where their chatter was deemed incompatible with the concentration for scholarly reading requires". They were called "subscribing ladies". One of them was the Geneva suffragette Émilie Gourd: a subscriber from the time of her father's death in 1909, she remained a subscriber until her own death in 1946, without being able to obtain full membership for women. In her monthly Le mouvement féministe, the activist writes that "the members of the Société de Lecture consider themselves superior, privileged and they do not intend to give up any of their privileges to these inferior beings, i.e. women". Moreover, throughout Switzerland, women were not allowed to be distracted from their family obligations by reading. They were confined to the stories of magazines such as the Schweizer Familie founded in 1893.

The ridiculousness of this situation came to a head in 1940, when a young woman won a competition in the Journal de Genève for a year's free membership of the Société de Lecture. It was impossible for her to take advantage of it. It was not until 1947 that the Sphere Room was opened to women "on a trial basis. Six years later, in 1953, women were allowed to become members. This was 18 years before they obtained the right to vote in Switzerland. As women emerged from this long reign of male exclusivity, they also took a major role in the management of the institution.

=== Lenin, member of the Société de Lecture ===
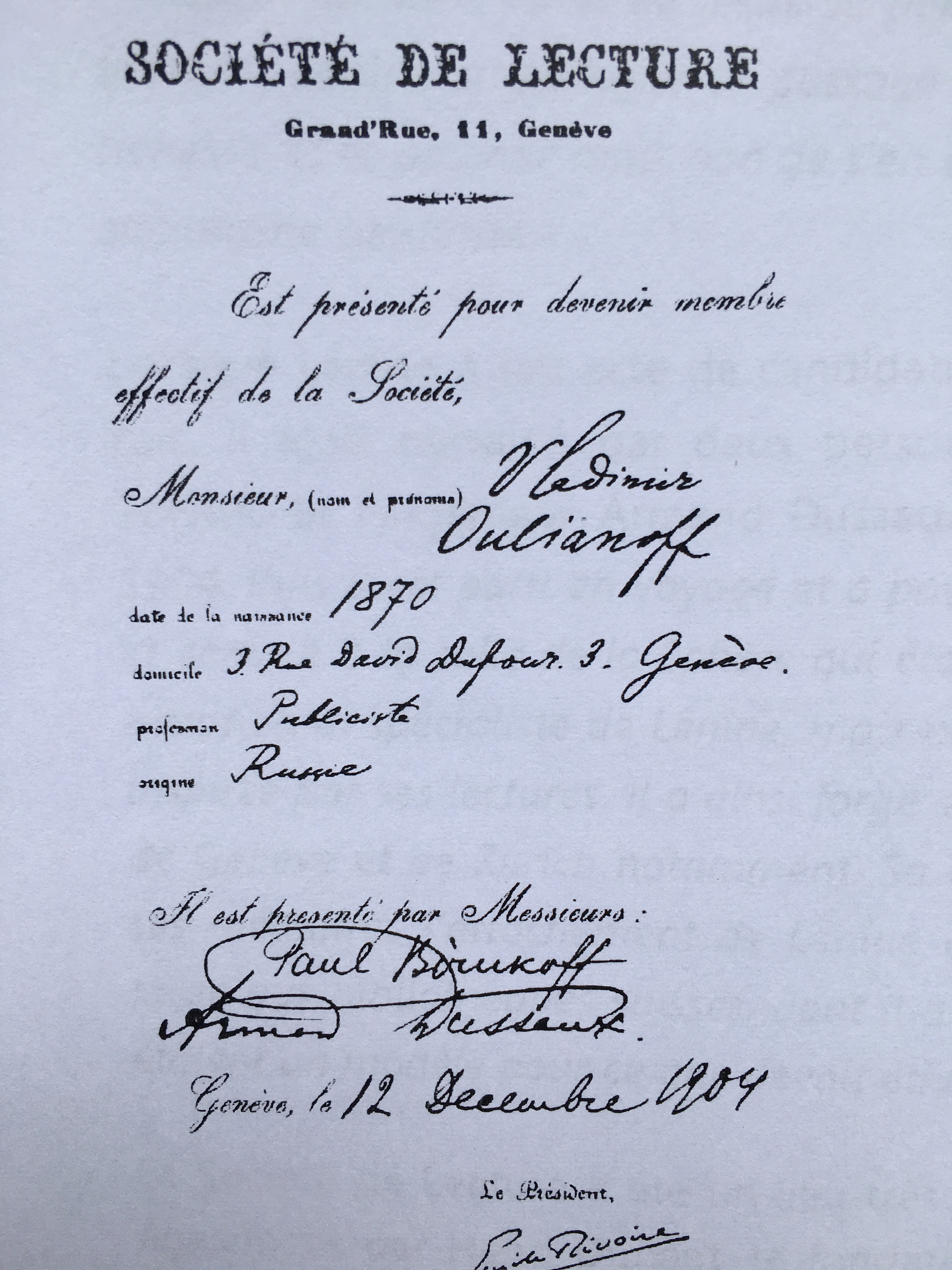
Lenin's membership card in 1904.

Great names of European culture such as Alice Rivaz, Nicolas Bouvier, Andreas Calvos, Jean Capo d'Istria, Camillo Cavour, Albert Cohen, Pierre de Coubertin, Henri Dunant, Guglielmo Ferrero, Franz Liszt, Edgard Milhaud, Gustave Moynier, Elisée Reclus, Ferdinand de Saussure, Juliusz Slowacki, Carl Vogt were members of the Société de Lecture. One of the most famous was Vladimir Ilitch Ulyanov, better known as Lenin.

At the beginning of the 20th century, Geneva was teeming with Russian refugees. Lenin settled in Geneva in 1903 and applied for admission on December 12, 1904. Among other things, it allowed him to escape the many other Russian refugees around the Public Library and to find the calm that was essential for his work. Paul Birukoff, former secretary to Leon Tolstoy, sponsored him. In his book "My Life with Lenin", his wife writes: "Vladimir Ilyich joined the Société de Lecture, where one could work comfortably and have access to a large number of books, as well as all kinds of magazines and newspapers in French, German and English. The Société de Lecture was not very busy, with only a few old professors in attendance, and Vladimir Ilyich was usually alone in one of the rooms. He could not only write in peace there, but also, as was his habit, wander around murmuring the sentences of his articles and take the books he needed from the shelves himself. It was really quiet there. Not a single Russian comrade came to join him; no one came to tell him that the Mensheviks were saying this and saying that; he could think. And he had something to think about". And a little further on, Nadezhda Krupskaya adds: "every morning the librarian of the Société de Lecture would see a Russian revolutionary arrive, with his trousers rolled up in the Swiss fashion to avoid the mud; he would open the military art book he had left the day before, sit down as usual at a small table in front of the window, pull back his thinning hair and start reading. From time to time he would go and consult some dictionary, then return to his seat and fill up many sheets of quarto paper in his small, quick handwriting".

Lenin also prepared speeches for political meetings in Geneva. According to accounts of the time, he would read his speeches aloud while walking between the shelves of the library to practise his elocution.

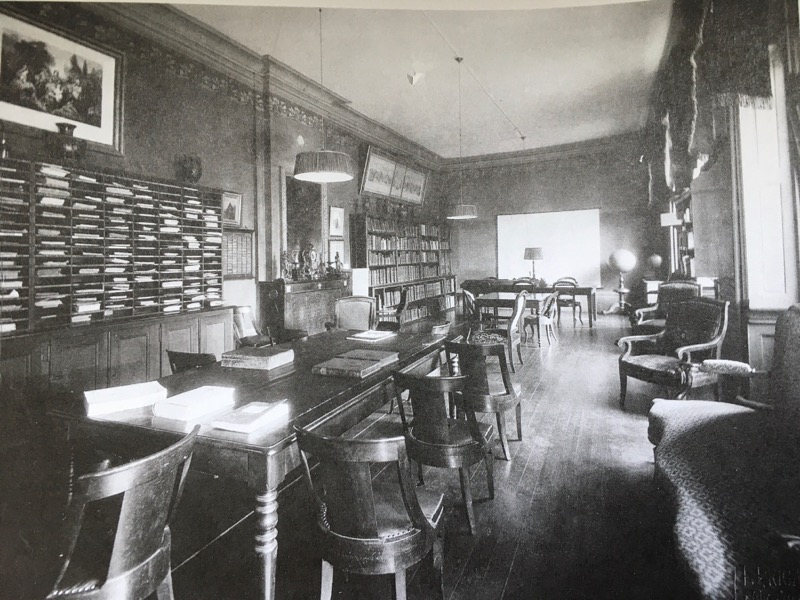
The Sphere Room in 1872 with the globe in the background was Lenin's favourite room. It was transformed to create the Salon des auteurs, the kitchen and the lift.

Alphonse Bernoud, a doctor of science and member of the Société de Lecture since 1901, also sheds light on the revolutionary's habits in the library: "Our tables were next to each other, Ulyanov had a predilection for the room where a huge globe stood and where the walls were covered with maps. Usually Ulyanov took notes on sheets of paper while reading. I often saw him copying large extracts from his readings". Another member remembers being called to order one day while he was talking aloud in the room, which he thought was empty, by a loud "shush": hidden by a pile of books, a gentleman with a blond beard was demanding silence. The two chatterboxes learned a few days later that the excited reader was called Ulyanov". It is comical to see the members of the Société de Lecture generally very bourgeois take pride in the fact that the Russian revolutionary found in their premises a place conducive to the development of his devastating theories.

Lenin followed the first clashes of the Russian Revolution of 1905 from the Société de Lecture. Haunted by the Paris Commune, he set about translating the Memoirs of General Cluseret, borrowed Alphonse Aulard's Histoire politique de la Révolution française and Edgard Quinet's La Révolution. In November, unable to bear it any longer, he left for Russia. He did not return to Geneva until January 1908 and reapplied for admission to the Société de Lecture on February 25, 1908. He stayed there for just under a year, during which time he and his wife went there twenty-eight times to borrow books of all kinds. The Russian revolutionary mixed serious and recreational reading: he alternated between military treatises and novels by Guy de Maupassant or Pierre Loti, philosophical treatises such as those by Hegel and the poetry of Victor Hugo. He also read Julius Caesar's Gallic War and Ernest Renan's Life of Jesus, which he annotated several times. Renan wrote that "Jesus wanted to destroy wealth and power, but not to seize them". In the margin, a fine annotation attributed to Lenin comments in French: "Comme le socialisme moderne" ("Like modern socialism"). Vladimir Ilyich was delighted with the services offered by the Société de Lecture. He marvelled at the fact that "in Switzerland, the reader is trusted". He even wrote: "If one day the Revolution occurs [in Russia], this is how we will organise ourselves". At the end of 1908, Lenin and his wife left Geneva for good.

In 1940, the Société de Lecture had the Latin motto "Timeo hominem unius libri" ("I fear the man of one book") inscribed above its entrance. Thomas Aquinas's formula was then given an ominous topicality: another political theorist, Adolf Hitler, spread his visions in his Mein Kampf and set Europe on fire.

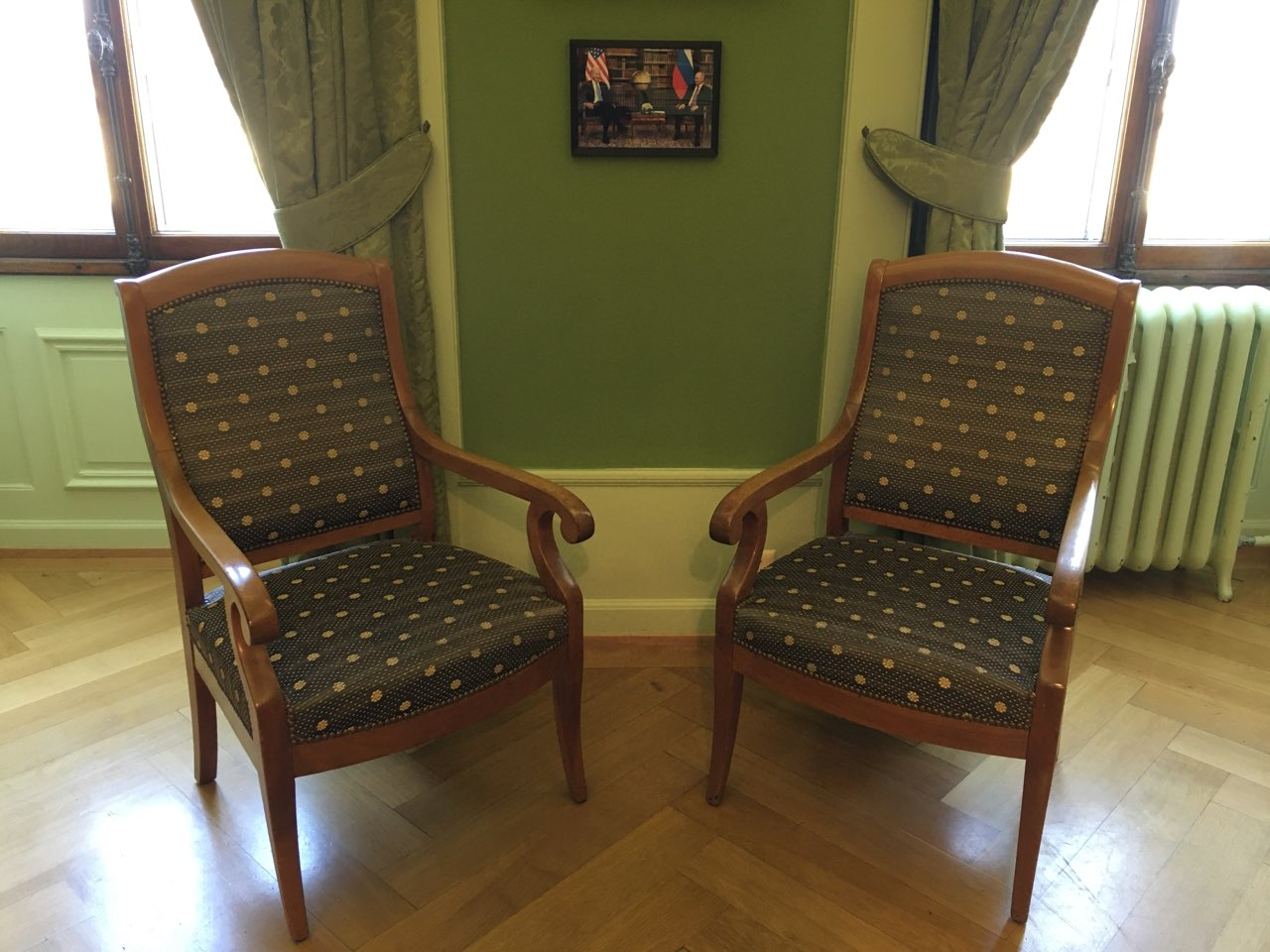
Armchairs used by Joe Biden and Vladimir Putin at the Geneva summit, June 16, 2021.

In a twist of history, when US President Joe Biden and Russian President Vladimir Putin met in Geneva on June 16, 2021, at the Villa La Grange, the four armchairs and 20 chairs on which all the participants in the summit sat, were loaned by the Société de Lecture. These Louis-Philippe style chairs date from 1840 and are covered with a fabric made of horsehair. An article in the newspaper Le Temps humorously notes that "in 1904, Lenin became a member of the Société de Lecture, introduced by Tolstoy's secretary. 120 years later, it is Putin who sits in this seat that may have served Lenin. An anecdote that may have escaped the Americans".

== Missions ==
=== Enrichment of the library ===
While the Société de Lecture's library has never ceased to grow, its orientations have evolved. Founded by men mainly interested in academic subjects, it initially focused on law, natural sciences, theology and political philosophy. From 1818 to 1833, the statutes obliged the members to enrich the collection themselves by donating books. The Société de Lecture quickly became the owner of 20,000 volumes. At first, novels were banned, then literature was gradually relegated to the highest floors. The only leisure books tolerated were travelogues. Apart from classical authors, plays remained as suspect as historical novels. The latter were a "waste of precious time" for "more than one category of people". From 1845 onwards, the arrival of the novel was a revolution. Authors sometimes offered their works, such as Eugène Sue's Les Mystères de Paris, which the Société de Lecture did not want to buy. The scandalous books were removed and stored in a "Hell" section inaccessible to the public. Their condemnation in France in 1857 did not prevent Charles Baudelaire's Les Fleurs du mal from entering the catalogue, twenty-five years after its publication. On the other hand, Guy de Maupassant's Mademoiselle Fifi and Octave Mirbeau's Le jardin des supplices were withdrawn from circulation at the request of scandalised members. In 1923, Victor Margueritte's novel La garçonne caused a new outcry: the heroine led "a sexual life that was clearly too free for the taste of decent people". As for the detective novels requested by readers, the Committee gave little consideration to the genre: detective stories were not included in the catalogue. They were discarded without mercy as soon as their extreme wear and tear made it necessary. In 1954, a reading Commission was created. It was made up of twelve volunteer readers who chose which of the new books lent by the booksellers would be bought and put into circulation. It selected more than five hundred new literary acquisitions each year. In 1976, the monthly magazine Plume au Vent has brought together reviews, in French or English, of the various works selected. This selection established by the reading Commission allowed the acquisitions, without being perfect, to be independent and demanding. In 1978, the Commission refused the acquisition of Pipes de terre et pipes de porcelaine, souvenirs d'une femme de chambre en Suisse romande, the testimony of Madeleine Lamouille, former maid to the grandparents of the Geneva writer Luc Weibel. Her memoirs were not very flattering for certain employers in Geneva's upper-class society. The librarian at the time, Jacques Picot, himself a member of this milieu, insisted that the book be purchased.

In 1972, the age of admission was lowered to 16 and a book-buying committee for young readers aged 6 to 12 was set up in 1979. In order to pass on a useful library to future generations, successive committees have directed book acquisitions essentially towards the promotion of Francophone culture. An important literary collection has thus been built up with classics, works by great thinkers, philosophers, economists and scientists, in translation but also in the original language. Today, this library offers its members direct access to 200,000 volumes, including nearly 9,000 works in English.

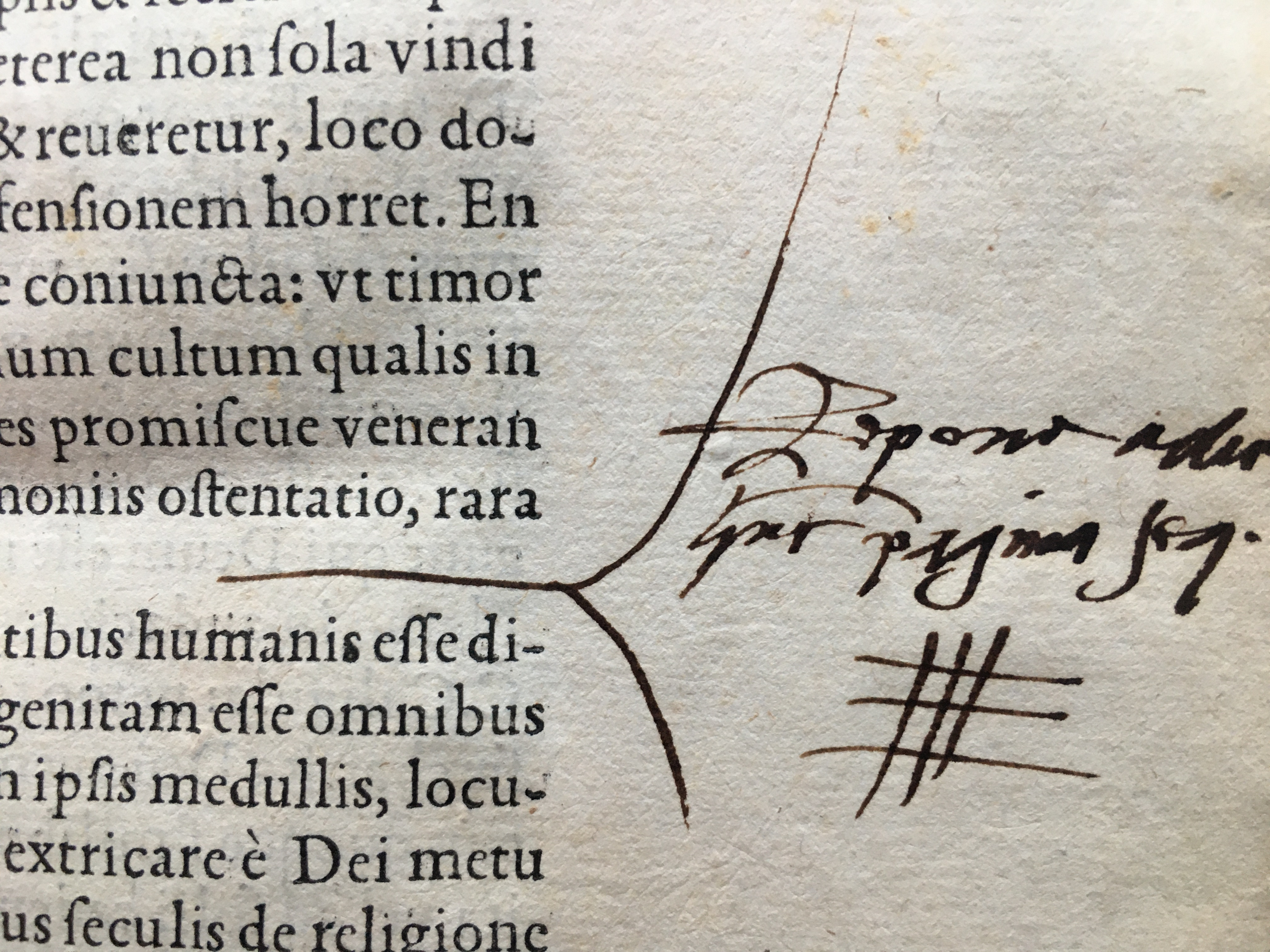
Handwritten annotation by John Calvin discovered in the Société de Lecture's collections in 2020.

The library is a historian's dream, providing access to numerous complete collections of journals and newspapers. It contains numerous old European periodicals, particularly from the 17th and 18th centuries (Mercure de France, Mercure danois, Journal des savants, Bibliothèque britannique, La rivista europea, Simplicissimus, Revue des Deux Mondes, Punch). It owns all the issues of the Journal de Genève, a Swiss daily newspaper with an international audience (1826-1998). It subscribes to about a hundred current periodicals and about ten daily newspapers are available to members. From 1976 to 1980, the Société de Lecture even received Playboy.

Over the years, a collection of old books has been built up, including old editions (notably of Bibles, Latin classics or eighteenth-century works such as Buffon's Histoire naturelle or Diderot and d'Alembert's Encyclopédie, published in Geneva in 1779), original editions of Calvin and art editions from the late nineteenth and early twentieth centuries, such as the first editions of the father of comics, Rodolphe Töpffer, which are a delight to bibliophiles. In 2020, researcher Max Engammare discovered unpublished handwritten annotations by the reformer John Calvin in a book in these collections.

In order to avoid irreparable damage, a specially equipped and air-conditioned room was created in 1984. Rare or fragile books are kept there. Since its foundation, the Société de Lecture has regularly called on bookbinders and craftsmen to maintain its collections and to restore the oldest works, such as René Descartes' Discourse on Method (Leiden, 1637) or Vitruvius' De architectura (Venice, 1497). The computerised catalogue of the collections is accessible via the Internet.

=== Developing a cultural Agenda ===
At the beginning of the 1980s, the institution initiated conferences in the spirit of the old "salon" tradition where literature, history or current themes were discussed in the form of lunch debates, workshops or lecture cycles. This organisation coincided with the launch of Bernard Pivot's literary TV programme Apostrophes, which introduced a new approach to books on television: the public became accustomed to meeting authors, independently of reading their works.

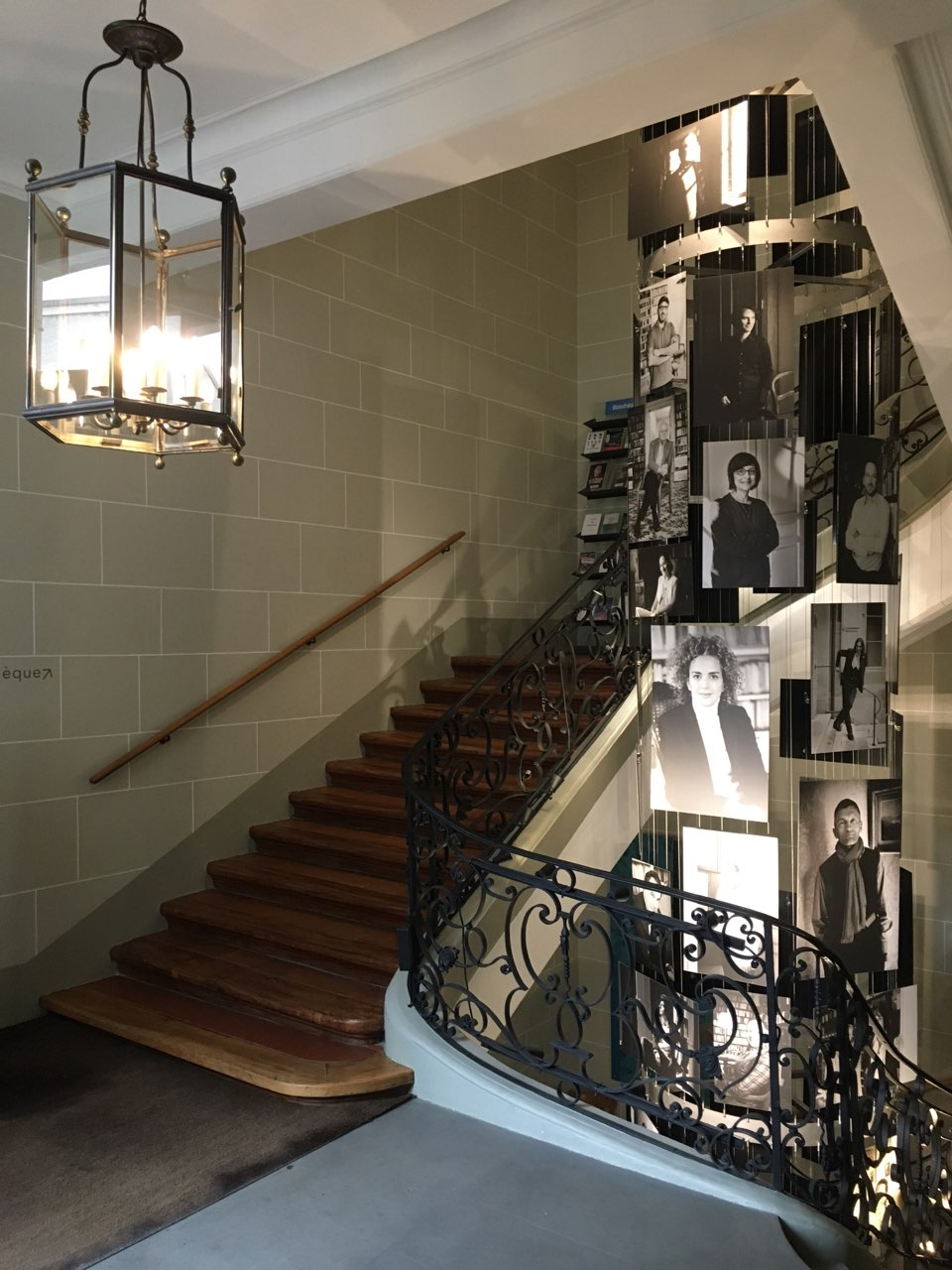
In the stairwell, the "Totem" presents portraits of lecturers who came to the institution.

The Société de Lecture hosts mainly writers but also lecturers from other disciplines. In 20 years, 700 lectures have taken place, 500 personalities from the arts and letters have given lectures or spoken with journalists within the walls of the institution. Here is a selection of speakers by category:

- Members of the Académie française: Dominique Bona, Antoine Compagnon, Barbara Cassin, Hélène Carrère d'Encausse, Dominique Fernandez, Alain Finkielkraut, Patrick Grainville, Dany Laferrière, Amin Maalouf, Andreï Makine, Jean d'Ormesson, Erik Orsenna, Jean-Marie Rouard, Jean-Christophe Rufin, Danièle Sallenave, Maurizio Serra
- Prix de l'Académie française: Dominique Barberis, Elie Barnavi, Sorj Chalandon, Adélaïde de Clermont-Tonnerre, François-Henri Désérable, Joël Dicker, Giuliano da Empoli, Franz-Olivier Giesbert, Pascal Quignard, Amélie Nothomb, Jean d'Ormesson
- Prix Femina: Patrick Deville, Jean-Paul Dubois, Clara Dupont-Monod, Eric Fottorino, Anne-Marie Garat, Sylvie Germain, Nancy Huston, Alexandre Jardin, Camille Laurens, Léonora Miano, Sylvain Prudhomme
- Prix Goncourt: Tahar Ben Jelloun, Didier van Cauwelaert, Jacques Chessex, Didier Decoin, Jean-Paul Dubois, Jean Echenoz, Dominique Fernandez, Laurent Gaudé, Patrick Grainville, Pascal Guignard, Pierre Lemaître, Amin Maalouf, Andreï Makine, Erik Orsenna, Atiq Rahimi, Jean-Christophe Rufin, Lydie Salvayre, Leïla Slimani
- Prix Goncourt des lycéens: Philippe Claudel, Sandrine Collette, Catherine Cusset, Sorj Chalendon, Joël Dicker, Clara Dupont-Monod, David Foenkinos, Laurent Gaudé, Sylvie Germin, Philippe Grimbert, Jean-Michel Guenassia, Nancy Huston, Andreï Makine, Carole Martinez, Léonora Miano, Erik Orsenna, Karine Tuil, Delphine de Vigan, Anne Wiazemsky
- Prix Médicis: Christine Angot, Sorj Chalandon, Marie Darrieussecq, Jean Echenoz, Dominique Fernandez, Jean Hatzfeld, Amélie Nothomb
- Prix Renaudot: Frédéric Beigbeder, Dominique Bona, Pascal Bruckner, Philippe Claudel, Annie Ernaux, David Foenkinos, Olivier Guez, Marie-Hélène Lafon, Alain Mabanckou, Amélie Nothomb, Daniel Pennac, Sylvain Tesson, Delphine de Vigan
- Non French-speaking authors: Carmine Abate, Alaa al-Aswany, Kathleen Alcott, Simon Armitage, John Boyne, Javier Cercas, Jonathan Coe, Rachel Cusk, Richard Ford, Georgi Gospodinov, David Grossman, Terry Hayes, Siri Hustvedt, Kathleen Jamie, Ismaël Kadaré, Douglas Kennedy, Deborah Levy, Philip Mansel, Colum McCann, Abir Mukherjee, Giles Milton, Clare O'Dea, William Ospina, Philippe Sands, Bernhard Schlink, Nicholas Shakespeare, Vandana Shiva, Colson Whitehead
- Actors: Dominique Blanc, Golshifteh Farahani, Brigitte Fossey, Guillaume Gallienne, Jacques Gamblin, Bernard Giraudeau, Francis Huster, Tom Novembre, Charlotte Ramplin
- Directors: Jacob Berger, Jean-Claude Carrière, Alain Françon, Dan Jemmet, Jean Liermier, Daniel Mesguich, Roger Planchon, Omar Porras, Olivier Py, Dominique Ziegler
- Cartoonists: Patrick Chapatte, Xavier Gorce, Martial Leiter, Mix et Remix, Gérald Poussin, Marjane Satrapi, Tom Tirabosco, Zep
- Journalists: Laure Adler, François Busnel, Claire Chazal, Eric Fottorino, Jérome Garcin, Pierre Haski, Etienne de Montety, Bernard Pivot, José Rodriguez dos Santos, Anne Sinclair, Augustin Trapenard
- Musicians: Karol Beffa, Mathias Duplessy, David Greilsammer, Barbara Hendricks
- Philosophers: Elisabeth Badinter, Lytta Basset, Pascal Bruckner, Dominique Bourg, André Comte-Sponville, Régis Debray, Raphaël Enthoven, Luc Ferry, Frédéric Lenoir, Fabrice Midal, Josef Schovanec
- Political personalities: Robert Badinter, Daniel Cohn-Bendit, Pascal Couchepin, Ruth Dreifuss, Jean-Noël Jeanneney, Bernard Kouchner, Edouard Philippe, Jean Ziegler

The complete list of all speakers since 2002 is available on the Société de Lecture website.

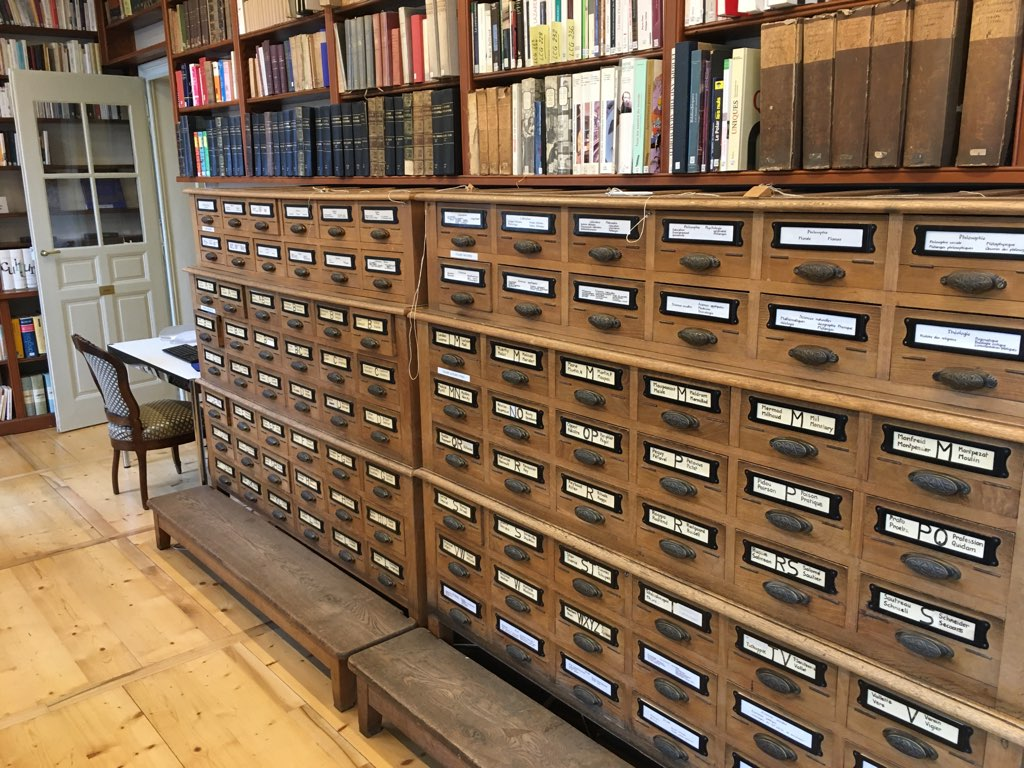
The manual file before the arrival of computers.

The sixty or so conferences organized each year, open to members and non-members alike, allow for "a real alchemy" between authors and readers. An annual cycle of eight to nine thematic conferences is organized around a geopolitical, cultural or existential question. A dozen literary workshops (writing workshops, reading circles) are organized each year and storytelling sessions are also organized for children. As of autumn 2021, the cultural program has welcomed non-French speaking authors, as a means to connect with "international Geneva".

=== Preserving a historic building ===
In May, 1679, the diplomatic relations between the Republic of Geneva and its powerful neighbour, France, underwent an important innovation: Louis XIV imposed a permanent resident to defend the interests of the Crown in the City of Calvin. The resident acted as an observer and intelligence officer. This last aspect should not be surprising. As François de Callières, author of a widely read work on how to negotiate with sovereigns, recalled in 1716, "an ambassador is called an honourable spy". As a second-rate ambassador, the resident's mission was to inform Versailles about what was happening in and around this small Protestant republic that controlled access to France, Switzerland, the Savoyard duchy, Germany, Austria and Italy.

The first resident settled in an old house set back from the Grand'Rue, owned by the Chapeaurouge family. At that time, at the bottom of the garden, there was a room which the resident converted into a chapel. In 1679, he had the first mass celebrated in Geneva since the Reformation: a scandal! Indeed, six years before the Revocation of the Edit de Nantes, the Catholic religion, suppressed during the Reformation in 1536, made a discreet entrance again with the representative of the Most Christian King who enjoyed the private exercise of his religion. This was a privilege enjoyed by all diplomats at the time. The population reacted strongly to what it considered to be a provocation. On March 26, 1680, the resident wrote to his government that, during the celebrations, the neighbours banged on pots and pans while singing Protestant psalms "at the top of their voices". Bricks were even thrown into the chapel during vespers and the faithful were copiously insulted on their way to the holy place. Little by little, passions calmed down. The practice of the Catholic religion became more discreet. Until the 19th century, the chapel of the French resident was the only place in Geneva where Catholic baptisms and marriages were celebrated. The use of this chapel did not survive the French revolutionary period.

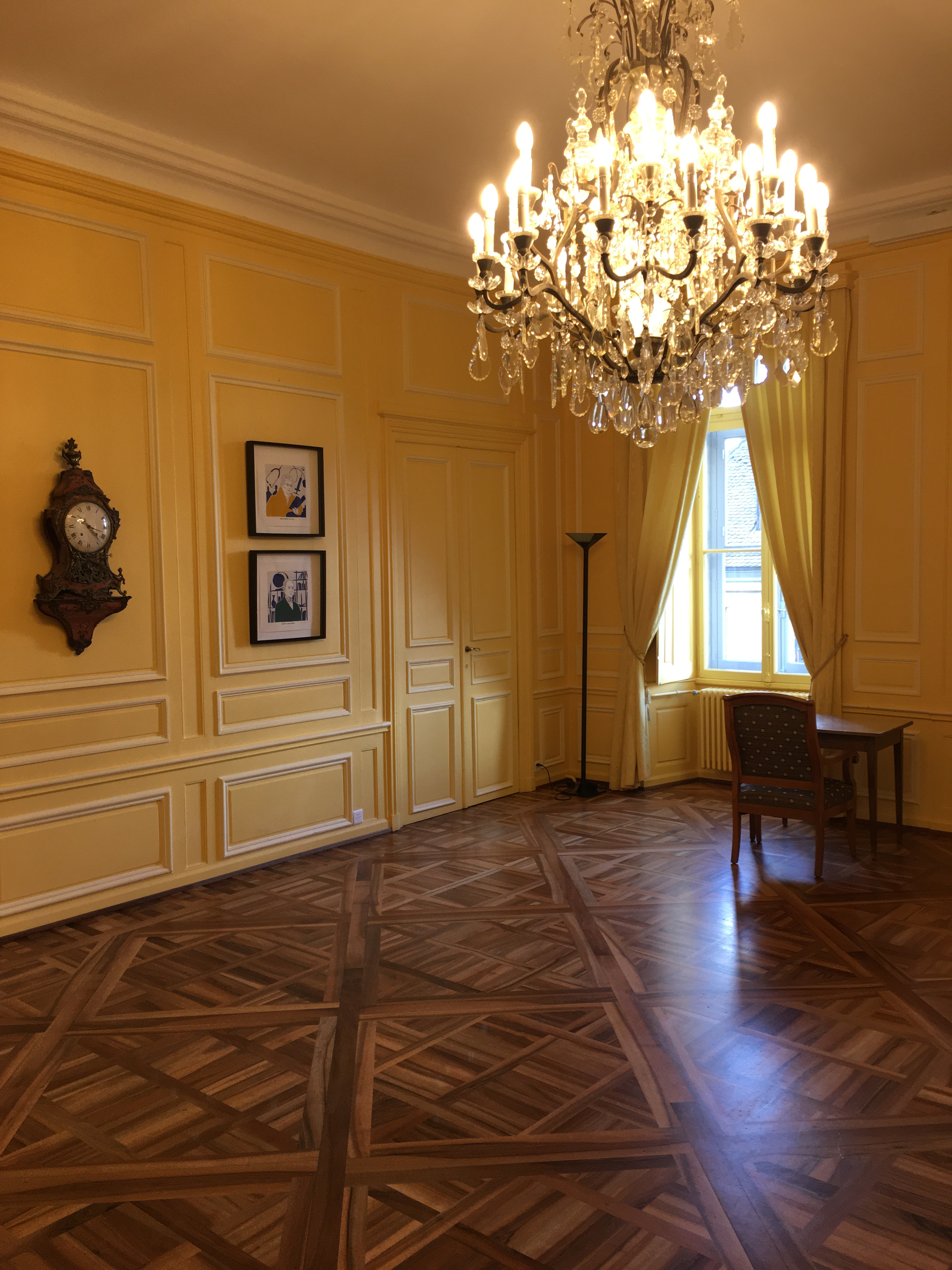
The First Consul Bonaparte was the guest of the Salon jaune on May 10, 1800.

As the rental building was very cramped, one of the residents let it be known that his government was going to buy land to build him a suitable residence. Fearing diplomatic complications, the Geneva Council then decided to build a residence worthy of the prestige of the French resident, in the same place, not far from the Hôtel de Ville. The mission was entrusted to the Geneva architect Jean-Michel Billon (1705-1778). Built on a limited space, this building, completed in 1743, comprises a main building and two outbuildings, one of which on the left is postictal, but which gives the whole a good balance. A fountain even stands against the wall with false windows.

The new building had cost the State of Geneva more than one hundred thousand pounds, and the State tried to obtain payment of rent. On February 24, 1744, Jean-Jacques Amelot, the French Minister of Foreign Affairs, declared to Isaac Thellusson, Geneva's envoy in Paris, "that the Lordship should find compensation for its expenses in the pleasure it had given to the King". There was no longer any question of rent.

Deserted by the resident of the Republic during the French Revolution between 1794 and 1798, the French residence temporarily housed a museum before becoming the Prefecture when Geneva was annexed by France in 1798. Geneva then became the capital of the Department of Lake Geneva and the mansion was transformed into the administrative centre of the prefect. On May 10, 1800, General Bonaparte, then First Consul, was the guest of the prefect Ange-Marie d'Eymar. He spent an evening there before crossing the Alps at the Grand Saint-Bernard pass to go to the plains of Italy where the victory of Marengo awaited him. In his handwritten diary, which describes this evening, Jean Picot paints an astonishing portrait of the man who was to become the Emperor of the French: "There is great silence at his entrance, he stares at the women without speaking to them, he then receives the courtship that everyone hastens to give him without doubt, as respected as any King has ever been; he is small, dressed like a divisional general, his hair is without black powder, it does not curl, his complexion is yellow, sickly but his face is expressive; his gaze is terrible, he remains standing for two hours in the middle of the room talking about Chemistry, Mathematics and in general Science to the men who approach him. General Lannes assures us that in the nine years that he has not left him, he has not seen him grant more than quarter of an hour to a society of women, and that he understands nothing of his conduct today, that it is a great favour that he does to our ladies. A Chinese fire is burnt to light his way out into the courtyard".

After the departure of the French in 1813, the return to independence and the integration of Geneva into the Swiss Confederation, the former prefecture was transformed into a place of instruction for the Geneva Academy and, once again, into a museum. In 1818, the Hôtel du Résident was shared between the academy and various societies. From 1818 onwards, the top two floors were used by the Société de Lecture, initially as a tenant. It then became the owner thanks to a subscription that enabled it to set up a property company when the building was put up for sale by the State in 1818, and then by gradually recovering the shares of this company until 1997. In order to ensure the financial future of the institution and the organisation of future restoration work, the Foundation Société de Lecture was set up in 1998. This foundation then became the owner of the historic building, which was listed in 1923.

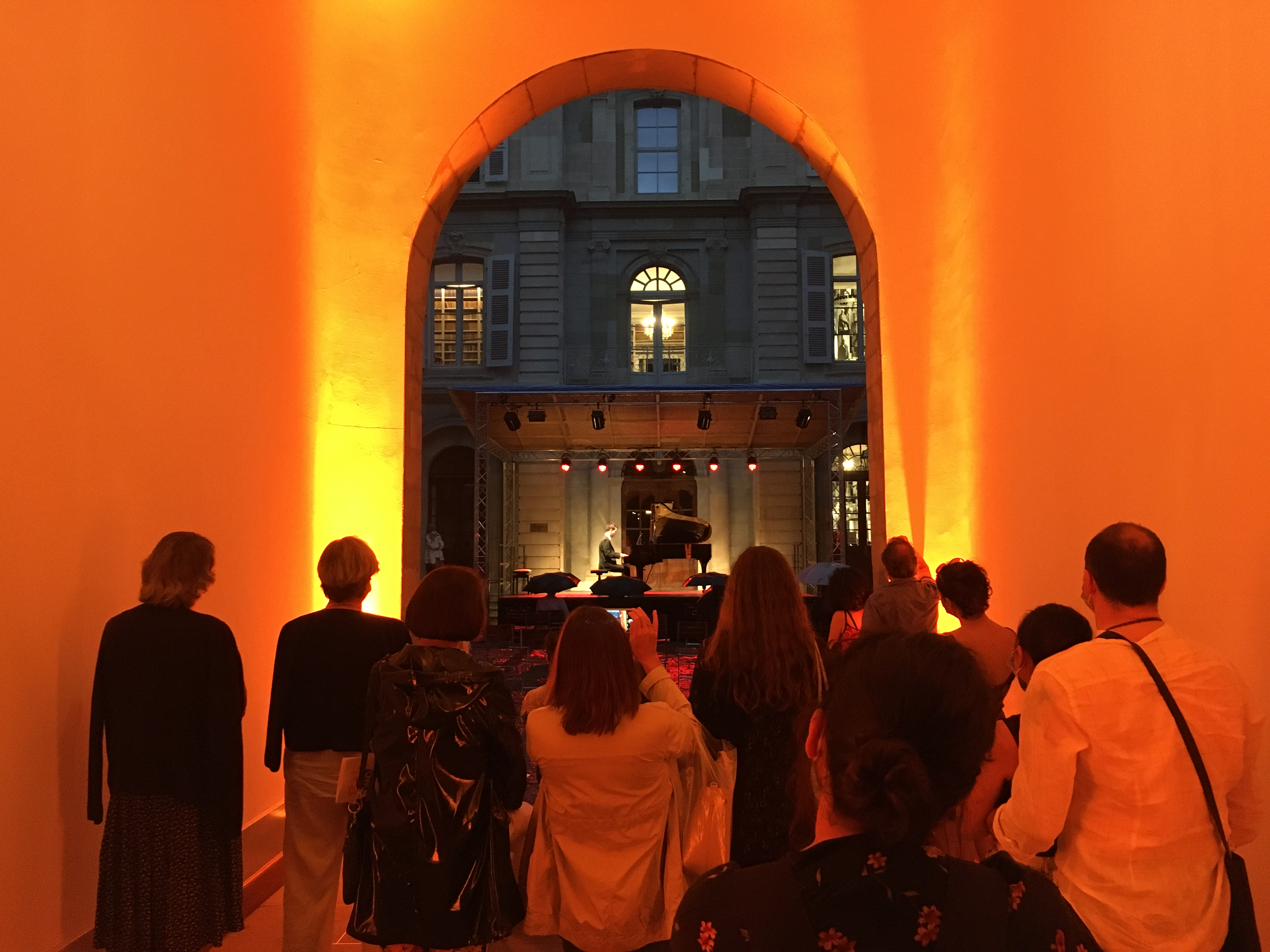
Fête de la Musique 2021 in the courtyard of the Société de Lecture.

Occupying "one of Geneva's most beautiful 18th century private mansions" implies constant conservation and restoration work that respects the original character. Work began in the 1870s to ensure circulation between the rooms and libraries. "The minutes of the committee meetings provide information on trivial but significant aspects of the life of the Société de Lecture: problems of heating, lighting and conveniences are persistent. The lack of drainage from the indoor latrines stank throughout the house. As for the urinals in the main courtyard, their removal in 1873 caused an uproar among their faithful users, despite the nuisance they caused.

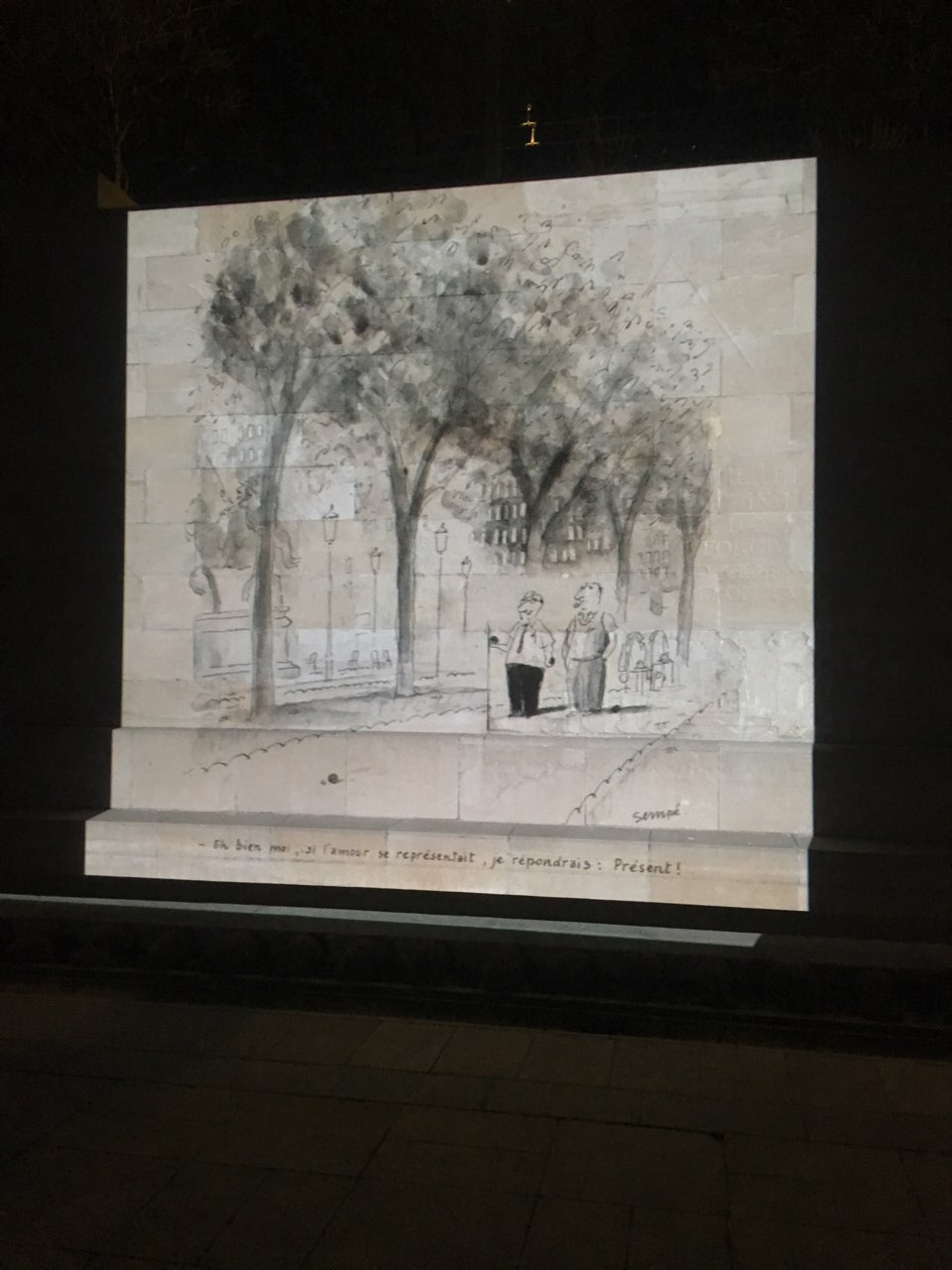

The most important restorations of the 20th century were carried out between 1984 and 1987, when the need for a total renovation of the building became apparent. This restoration was carried out under the presidency of Maître Olivier Weber-Caflisch and his committee, who found the funding for the work. The dilapidated roof, which did not prevent the rain from seeping in and sometimes flooding precious collections, was redone. A "compactus", a mobile and secure library, was fitted out to enable tens of thousands of books to be stored without fear of the floors being overloaded. The polychromy of the original woodwork was restored. The wall hangings and curtains were made in the same spirit and using 18th century fabrics and textures. The dilapidated parquet floors were restored or rebuilt according to the model of those that had stood the test of time. All the furniture was refurbished by appealing to the generosity of the members. The courtyard was repaved in the old style. The entrance hall, the stairwell and the banister were restored.

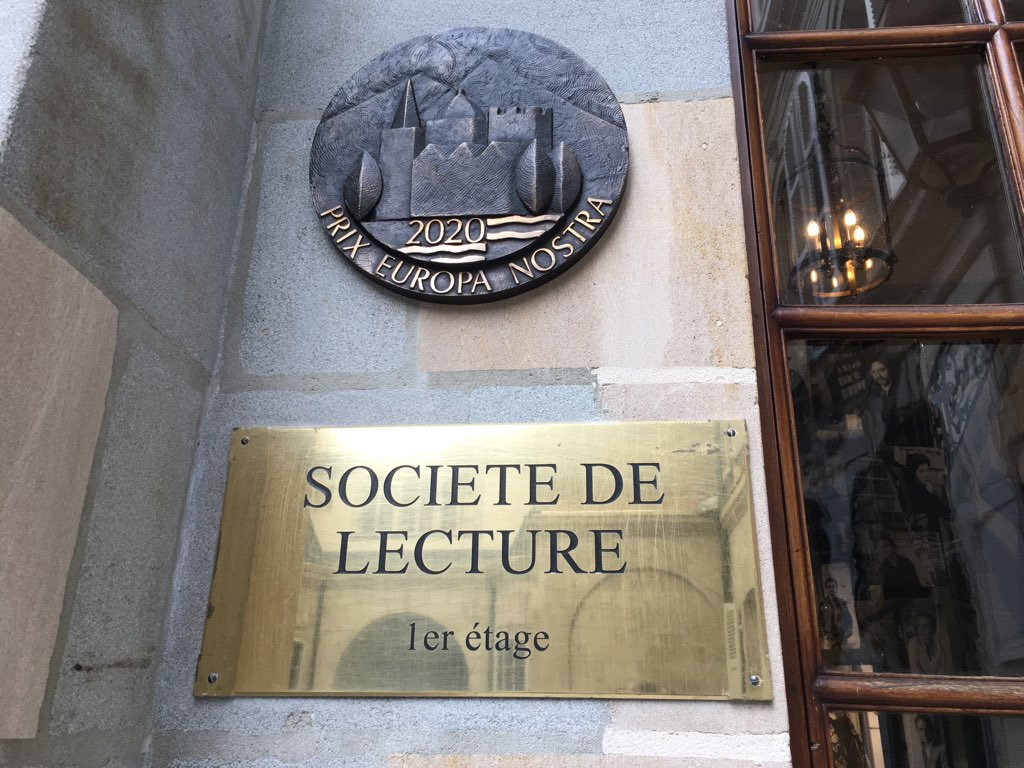
Europa Nostra's plaque at the entrance.

The Geneva authorities regularly use the courtyard of the building to organise concerts for the Fête de la Musique. The Société de Lecture is also used as a filming location for television programmes.

== The bicentennial ==
The Société de Lecture celebrated its 200th on May 17, 2018, with honorable guests such as Bernard Pivot, then president of the Académie Goncourt and former host of the television shows Apostrophes and Bouillon de Culture, as well as authors and members of the Académie Goncourt Pierre Assouline, Tahar Ben Jelloun, Philippe Claudel, and Eric-Emmanuel Schmitt.

Corinne Chaponnière, journalist and author of a very detailed historical study marking the bicentennial, recalled on this occasion that the founders of the Société de Lecture were "twelve generous personalities, not barbarians, no, but scholars eager to disseminate science and new thoughts. The Genevan fire of the Enlightenment, on the ruins of the Napoleonic empire, of which Geneva was a prefecture".

== Exhibitions ==
Jean-Gabriel Eynard, co-founder of the Société de Lecture, was one of the Swiss pioneers of the daguerreotype. Eager to perpetuate his heritage, the Société de Lecture organises or hosts photography exhibitions (Afars in 1999, No'Photo in 2019) as well as conferences and workshops with photographers (Ferrante Ferranti, Gabriele Galimberti, James Hill, Marine Lanier, Yan Morvan, Didier Ruef, Paolo Woods). In 2018, on the occasion of the bicentennial, a "totem" pole was installed in the stairwell, allowing the hanging of portraits of the lecturers, made by Rebecca Bowring and Magali Dougados, official photographers of the Société de Lecture.

At the beginning of 2021, the COVID-19 pandemic paralysed Geneva's cultural life and social exchanges. The uncertainties were overbearing. There were few opportunities for celebration. The Société de Lecture set up the exhibition "Un printemps avec Sempé" in collaboration with the Martine Gossieaux Gallery and the City of Geneva. Some fifty drawings by Jean-Jacques Sempé were projected at the beginning of the evening on the façades of five emblematic places: the Grand Théâtre de Genève, the Palais Eynard, the Uni Bastions, the Reformers' Wall and the Société de Lecture. This monumental and poetic exhibition took place from 17 March to 7 April 2021. It was the first of its trend and a responding success.

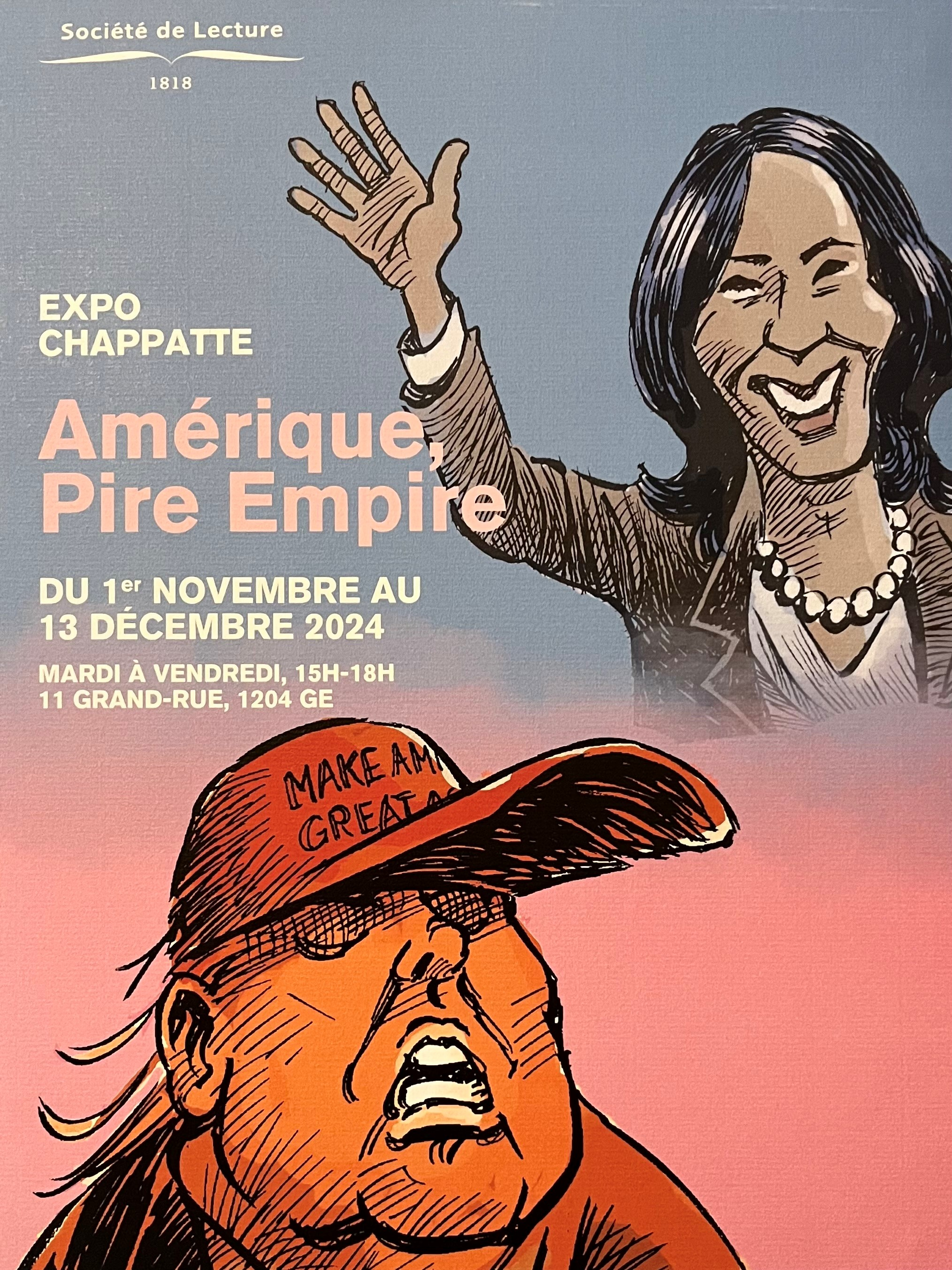
Poster of the exhibition "Amérique, Pire Empire"

At the end of 2024, an exhibition entitled “Amérique, pire empire” (America, the worst empire) showcases Patrick Chappatte's drawings from the presidential campaign. The incisive press cartoonist, who sketches current affairs with humor and accuracy for Le Temps, the NZZ, Der Spiegel, Le Canard enchaîné and the Boston Globe, among others, chairs the Freedom Cartoonists Foundation (co-founded with Plantu and Marie Heuzé), which awards an international prize every two years, with the City of Geneva, to honor cartoonists for their talent and courage.

== Awards ==
- 2009: Delphine de Candolle, cultural director of the Société de Lecture from 2001 to 2025, received the Grand Prix du Rayonnement de la langue et de la littérature françaises from the Académie française (Médaille de vermeil).
- 2013: Delphine de Candolle was appointed Chevalier de l'Ordre des Arts et des Lettres.
- 2020: Prix Europa Nostra in the category "Exemplary contribution".
- 2022: Delphine de Candolle was appointed Officier de l'Ordre des Arts et des Lettres.
