= Prix Louis-Guilloux =

French literacy award

The Prix Louis-Guilloux is a French literary award established in 1983 by the Conseil général of the Côtes-d'Armor with the writers Yvon Le Men, Yannick Pelletier (specialist of Louis Guilloux).

The idea of this prix is "to perpetuate the literary ideals and values of the Breton writer". The prize is granted each year to a work in the French language which is characterised by "the humane qualities of generous thought, refusing all dualism and all sacrifice of individuality in favour of ideological abstractions".

== Laureates ==
Year	Author	Title	Publisher
2016	Makenzy Orcel	L'Ombre animale	Zulma
2015	Abdourahman Waberi	La Divine Chanson	Zulma
2014	Hubert Mingarelli	L’homme qui avait soif	Stock
2013	Hubert Haddad	Le Peintre d'éventail	Zulma
2012	Sylvain Prudhomme	Là, avait dit Bahi	l’Arbalète Éditions Gallimard
2011	Frédéric Valabrègue	Le Candidat	Éditions P.O.L
2010	Ananda Devi	Le Sari vert	Gallimard
2009	Bernard Chambaz	Yankee	Éditions du Panama
2008	Boualem Sansal	Le Village de l'Allemand ou le Journal des frères Schiller	Gallimard
2007	Christian Prigent	Demain je meurs	P.O.L.
2006	Léonora Miano	L'Intérieur de la nuit	Plon
2005	Lyonel Trouillot	Bicentenaire	Actes Sud
2004	Catherine Lépront	Des gens du monde	Éditions du Seuil
2003	Olivier Rolin	Tigre en papier	Seuil
2002	François Bon	Mécanique	Éditions Verdier
2001	Andrée Chedid	Le Message	Flammarion
2000	Jean Rolin	Campagnes	Gallimard
1999	Jean Vautrin	pour l’ensemble de son œuvre	
1998	Marc Trillard	Coup de lame	Éditions Phébus
1997	Pierre Michon	La Grande Beune	Verdier
1996	Hervé Prudon	Nadine Mouque	Gallimard
1995	Jorge Semprún	L'Écriture ou la Vie	Gallimard
1994	Sylvie Germain	Immensités	Gallimard
1993	Didier Daeninckx	Zapping	Éditions Denoël
1992	Alain Dugrand	Le Quatorzième Zouave	Éditions de l'Olivier
1991	Nicolas Bouvier	Journal d'Aran et d'autres lieux	Payot
1990	Philippe Le Guillou	La Rumeur du soleil	Gallimard
1989	Philippe Hadengue	Petite Chronique des gens de nuit dans un port de l'Atlantique Nord (Inter Book Prize)	Pauvert
1988	André Hodeir	Le Joueur de violon	Seuil
1987	Gilles Lapouge	La Bataille de Wagram	Flammarion
1985	Jean David	Bonsoir, Marie-Josèphe	Jean Picollec
1983	Jean-Claude Bourlès	Chronique du bel été	Jean Picollec
