= Valabrègue =

Valabrègue is a surname. Notable people with the surname include:

- Frédéric Valabrègue (born 1952), French writer
- Mardochée Valabrègue (1852–1934), French soldier
