= Jean-Claude Bourlès =

French writer

Jean-Claude Bourlès (22 November 1937, Rennes) is a French writer-traveller from Brittany.

Passionate about the camino de Santiago, he wrote three books on the subject, relating, for the first two, his own experience as a pilgrim of the path of paths, the third being a sort of collection of testimonies on the motivations of the many pilgrims he met.

As a writer, he participated in many magazines such as Grands Reportages, Terre Sauvage, Pays de Bretagne.

His work Chronique du bel été earned him the Prix Louis-Guilloux in 1983.

== Bibliography ==
- 1976: Les vents noirs, poems, Millas Martin
- 1978: Cantilènes, poems, Chambelland
- 1981: Fleurs vagabondes, poems, Michelle Brouta
- 1981: Sillages d'hiver, poems, illustrations by Bernard Louedin, Éditions du Coq
- 1982: Chronique du bel été, Picollec, Prix Louis-Guilloux
- 1995: Retour à Conques, Payot
- 1995: Sur les chemins de Compostelle, Payot
- 1997: Louis Guilloux, les maisons d'encre, photographs by Jean Hervoche, Christian Pirot
- 1998: Passants de Compostelle, Payot
- 1998: Le grand chemin de Compostelle, Payot, Prix du Roman d'aventure
- 1999: Une Bretagne intérieure, Flammarion
- 2001: Pèlerin sans église, Desclée de Brouwer
- 2002: Guillaume Manier : un paysan picard à St-Jacques de Compostelle, Payot, 2002
- 2003: Escapades avec Don Quichotte, Payot
- 2005: Ma vie avec Sancho Pança, Payot
- 2012: Le frisson des départs (in collaboration with Yvon Boëlle), Salvator
