= Jean-Pierre Milovanoff =

French writer (born 1940)

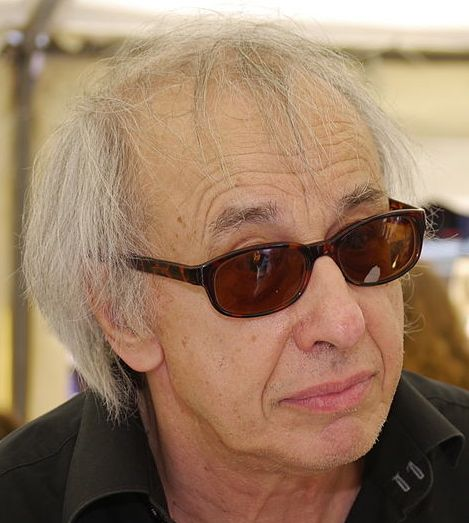
- Jean-Pierre Milovanoff in Montpellier, in 2011.
- Born: 1940 (age 85–86); Nîmes
- Occupation: Writer
- Awards: Prix Goncourt des lycéens (1997); Prix des libraires (2000)

Jean-Pierre Milovanoff (born 1940, in Nîmes) is a French writer, laureate of several literary prizes

Milovanoff's father was born in Russia and left his country in 1919; His mother is of Provencal origin. He studied letters at Montpellier and at the Sorbonne. He is a radio producer at France Culture and lived successively in Paris, Montpellier and Copenhagen. His first novel La Fête interrompue was published in 1970. He wrote three collections of poems entitled Borgo Babylone, La Ballade du lépreux et Noir devant.

In 1997, Jean-Pierre Milovanoff received the prix Goncourt des lycéens for his novel le Maître des paons.

He resides in Génolhac.

== Works ==
Novels

- 1970: La Fête interrompue, éditions de Minuit
- 1978: Rempart mobile, éditions de Minuit
- 1993: L'Ouvreuse, éditions Julliard
- 1994: La Rosita, Julliard
- 1995: Russe blanc, Julliard
- 1996: La Splendeur d'Antonia, Julliard, Prix France Culture.
- 1997: Le Maître des paons, Julliard, Prix Goncourt des lycéens.
- 1999: L'Offrande sauvage, éditions Grasset, Prix des libraires.
- 2000: Auréline, Grasset
- 2002: La Mélancolie des innocents, Grasset, Prix France Télévisions.
- 2004: Dernier Couteau, Grasset
- 2005: Le Pays des vivants, Grasset
- 2006: Tout sauf un ange, Grasset
- 2008: Emily ou la déraison, Grasset
- 2009: L'Amour est un fleuve de Sibérie, Grasset
- 2011: Terreur grande, Grasset
- 2012: L’Hiver d'un égoïste et le Printemps qui en suivit, Grasset
- 2014: Le Visiteur aveugle, Grasset
- 2015: Le Mariage de Pavel, Grasset

Theatre

- 1988: Squatt, éditions Comp'Act
- 1990: Le Roi d'Islande, éditions Comp'Act
- 1990: Side-car, éditions Comp'Act
- 1995: Cinquante mille nuits d’amour, éditions Julliard
- 1997: Ange des peupliers, éditions Julliard

Essay

- 1998: Presque un manège, éditions Julliard

Poetry

- 1997: Borgo Babylone, éditions Unes
- 1997: Une petite main, éditions Unes
- 1998: La Ballade du lépreux, éditions Unes
- 2004: Noir Devant, éditions Seghers

Books for children

- 2002: Les Sifflets de monsieur Babouch, éditions Actes Sud-Papiers
- 2006: Clam la rapide, éditions du Seuil
- 2008: La Carpe de tante Gobert, éditions Acte Sud-Papiers

== Bibliography ==
- Bastide, Bernard (2008). "Je crois aux attachements... », Jean-Pierre Milovanoff". Balade dans le Gard;sur les pas des écrivains. Les écrivains vagabondent (in French). Paris: Alexandrines. pp. 18–25. ISBN 978-2-370890-01-6. Archived from the original on 2015-09-14.
- Velay, Serge; Boissard, Michel; B.-Boissard, Catherine (2009). Petit dictionnaire des écrivains du Gard (in French). Nîmes: Alcide. p. 255. Archived from the original on 2015-07-23.
