= Philippe Hadengue =

French painter and writer (1932–2021)

Philippe Hadengue (17 September 1932 – 18 October 2021) was a French writer and painter, winner of the Inter Book Prize and the Prix Louis-Guilloux in 1989 for Petite chronique des gens de nuit dans un port de l'Atlantique Nord.

== Work ==
- 1989: Petite chronique des gens de nuit dans un port de l'Atlantique Nord, éd. Maren Sell — prix du Livre Inter and prix Louis-Guilloux
- 1989: La Cabane aux écrevisses, éd. Maren Sell
- 1993: La Loi du cachalot, éd. Calmann-Lévy
- 1999: Quelqu'un est mort dans la maison d'en face, éd. Pauvert
- 1999: L'Exode, éd. Pauvert
- 2001: Un Te Deum en Île-de-France, éd. Pauvert
- 2006: Lames, éd. Maren Sell
