= Marc Trillard =

French writer (born 1955)

Marc Trillard (born 1955 in Baden-Baden) is a French writer.

He publishes his contributions to many titles in the French press. He is also the author of documentaries for radio France Culture and France 3 television.

He settled in Brazil in 2010.

== Work ==
- 1988: Un exil, R. Deforges,
- 1999: Coup de lame, R. Deforges, Éditions du Seuil
- 1994: Eldorado 51, Éditions Phébus
- 1995: Tête de cheval, Phébus
- 1996: Cabotage : à l'écoute des chants des îles du cap vert, Phébus
- 1998: Madagascar, Marcus
- 1999: Cuba : en attendant l'année prochaine, Vilo
- 2000: Si j'avais quatre dromadaires, Phébus
- 2001: Campagne dernière, Phébus
- 2003: Le maître et la mort, Éditions Gallimard
- 2006 De sabres et de feu, Le Cherche Midi,
- 2006: Amazonie, rencontre avec un géant, Éditions du Rocher
- 2011: Les Mamiwatas, Actes Sud
- 2016: L’Anniversaire du roi, Actes Sud

== Literary prizes ==
- Prix Interallié 1994 for Eldorado 51
- Prix Louis-Guilloux 1998 for Coup de lame
