= Yann Apperry =

French writer (born 1972)

Yann Apperry (born 1972) is a French novelist, librettist, screenwriter, and translator. He is a recipient of the Prix Médicis, the Prix Goncourt des lycéens and the Writer's Fellowship of the Fondation Hachette. A former resident of the French Academy at Rome, he was also a resident of Villa Kujoyama and Randell Cottage in Wellington, New Zealand. He is one of the founders of Groupe Ouest and Abalone Productions. He has been performing since 2006 with Claude Barthélemy in the musical duo Bruit Blanc.

== Publications ==
=== Novels ===
- 1997: Qui Vive, Éditions de Minuit
- 1999: Paradoxe du ciel nocturne, Éditions Grasset
- 2000: Diabolus in Musica, Grasset
- 2003: Farrago, Grasset
- 2008: Terre sans maître, Grasset

=== Theatre ===
- 2003: Les Hommes sans aveu, Actes Sud

=== Youth literature ===
- 2009: L'Île aux histoires, with Tanja Siren, L'École des loisirs

== Theater and musical performances ==
- 2002: Mercure apocryphe, directed by Valérie Crunchant
- 2002: Je dirai ceci d'obscur, Petit Odéon, Théâtre de l'Odéon
- 2003: Les Hommes sans aveu, Théâtre du Gymnase (Marseille), Théâtre National de Chaillot
- 2009: Terra Vagans, Théâtre du Gymnase
- 2010: Calvino Reloaded, Festival des Correspondances de Manosque, La Dynamo
- 2012: Mineurs, with pupils of collège Maurice de Vlaminck in Brezolles

== Radio ==
- 2002: Les Sentimentales funérailles, France Culture, music by Massimo Nunzi
- 2008: Bruit Blanc, France Culture, with Claude Barthélémy
- 2012: La Foire aux chansons, France Culture, music by Régis Huby
- 2012: Calvinologie, France Culture, music by Massimo Nunzi.

== Scripts ==
- 2007: 24 mesures, by Jalil Lespert
- 2013: YSL, by Jalil Lespert, contribution to the script

== Discography ==
- 1999:Vuoti a perdere, bande originale du film, music by Massimo Nunzi
- 2010: All Around, Abalone-Oenso, music by Régis Huby
- 2011: Lieder, 3=Tomato, record by Claude Barthélémy

== Translations ==
- 2002 : IX variations sur un thème de Balthus, Horacio Amigorena, Absteme & Bobance
- 2007: Tessons roses, Ornela Vorpsi, Actes Sud
- 2014: Alex's Baby, Anne de Pasquale, Marabout

== Prizes ==
- 1997: Prix Bretagne for Qui vive
- 1997: Boursier de la Fondation Hachette
- 2000: Prix Médicis for Diabolus in musica
- 2002: Grand Prix international de la fiction radiophonique Paul Gilson for Les Sentimentales funérailles
- 2003: Prix Goncourt des lycéens for Farrago
