= Prix Goncourt des Lycéens =

French literary award

The Prix Goncourt des Lycéens is a French literary award voted for by school students. It was created in 1988 under the patronage of the Prix Goncourt, with the aim of giving young readers the chance to read and discuss the books selected as the best of the year and to elect their chosen winner. The ten members of the Académie Goncourt select twelve literary works as nominees. Some two thousand lycée (roughly equivalent to US high school) students read all twelve novels, participate in discussions and debates about them, and ultimately vote on the winner.

While the prize bears the name of the Académie Goncourt, the competition is sponsored and organized by the French Ministry of National Education in partnership with the largest French media retailer Fnac and the organisation Bruit de lire.

Each year's winner is announced in Rennes on the same day as the announcement of the Prix Goncourt, usually in November.

== Laureates of the Prix Goncourt des Lycéens ==
A complete list of previous winners can be found at the prize's official website.

Year		Author	Title	Publisher (x times)	Notes
1988	nothumb	Erik Orsenna	L'Exposition coloniale	Seuil	Also prix Goncourt
1989		Jean Vautrin	Un grand pas vers le bon Dieu	Grasset	Also prix Goncourt
1990		Françoise Lefèvre	Le Petit Prince Cannibale	Actes Sud	
1991		Pierre Combescot	Les Filles du Calvaire	Grasset (2)	Also prix Goncourt
1992	nothumb	Eduardo Manet	L'Île du lézard vert	Flammarion	
1993	nothumb	Anne Wiazemsky	Canines	Gallimard	
1994		Claude Pujade-Renaud	Belle mère	Actes Sud (2)	
1995	nothumb	Andreï Makine	Le Testament français	Mercure de France	Also prix Goncourt et prix Médicis
1996	nothumb	Nancy Huston	Instruments des ténèbres	Actes Sud (3)	Also prix du Livre Inter
1997	nothumb	Jean-Pierre Milovanoff	Le Maître des paons	Julliard	
1998	nothumb	Luc Lang	Mille six cents ventres	Fayard	
1999	nothumb	Jean-Marie Laclavetine	Première Ligne	Gallimard (2)	
2000	nothumb	Ahmadou Kourouma	Allah n'est pas obligé	Seuil (2)	Also prix Renaudot
2001	nothumb	Shan Sa	La Joueuse de go	Grasset (3)	
2002	nothumb	Laurent Gaudé	La Mort du roi Tsongor	Actes Sud (4)	Also prix des libraires
2003		Yann Apperry	Farrago	Grasset (4)	
2004	nothumb	Philippe Grimbert	Un secret	Grasset (5)	
2005	nothumb	Sylvie Germain	Magnus	Albin Michel	
2006	nothumb	Léonora Miano	Contours du jour qui vient	Plon	
2007	nothumb	Philippe Claudel	Brodeck's Report	Stock	
2008	nothumb	Catherine Cusset	Un brillant avenir	Gallimard (3)	
2009	nothumb	Jean-Michel Guenassia	Le Club des incorrigibles optimistes	Albin Michel (2)	
2010	nothumb	Mathias Énard	Parle-leur de batailles, de rois et d'éléphants	Actes Sud (5)	
2011	nothumb	Carole Martinez	Du domaine des Murmures	Gallimard (4)	
2012	nothumb	Joël Dicker	The Truth About the Harry Quebert Affair	Éditions de Fallois	Also Grand prix du roman de l'Académie française
2013	nothumb	Sorj Chalandon	Le Quatrième Mur	Grasset (6)	
2014	nothumb	David Foenkinos	Charlotte	Gallimard (5)	Also prix Renaudot
2015	nothumb	Delphine de Vigan	D'après une histoire vraie	JC Lattès	Also prix Renaudot
2016	nothumb	Gaël Faye	Petit Pays	Grasset	Also prix du roman Fnac
2017	nothumb	Alice Zeniter	L'Art de perdre	Flammarion (2)	Also prix littéraire du Monde
2018	nothumb	David Diop	Frère d'âme	Seuil (3)	
2019		Karine Tuil	Les Choses humaines	Gallimard (6)	Also prix Interallié
2020	nothumb	Djaïli Amadou Amal	Les Impatientes	Emmanuelle Collas	Also Choix Goncourt de l'Orient
2021	nothumb	Clara Dupont-Monod	S'adapter	Stock	Also prix Femina
2022	nothumb	Sabyl Ghoussoub	Beyrouth-sur-Seine	Stock	
2023	nothumb	Neige Sinno	Triste Tigre	Éditions P.O.L	Also prix Femina and prix littéraire du Monde
2024	nothumb	Sandrine Collette	Madelaine avant l'aube	Lattès	
