= Catherine Lépront =

Catherine Lépront (June 1951, Le Creusot – 19 August 2012) was a French novelist, playwright, short story writer and essayist.

== Biography ==
Catherine Lépront was born into a family of doctors and musicians. First of all a liberal nurse (an experience which she described in her narrative Des gens du monde), she was a playwright and literary advisor for the Éditions Gallimard. Her novels intertwine intimate and family history and political history. The memory of the Second World War, the Indochina War, the Algerian War, the colonial tragedies and those of the totalitarian world haunt her characters on which she looks with empathy and tender irony. All her work is marked by a profound criticism of bourgeois hypocrisy, arbitrary power and obtuse conformity. She excels at reproducing oral speech, while deepening the subtleties of inner reflections, intrigues with acute psychological tensions, and creating a poetic and lyrical climate that reminds of Virginia Woolf and some Russian writers. Music, painting, and artistic creation in general played a decisive role here.

Her second husband was the Germanic philosopher Marc de Launay.

== Works ==
- 1983: Le Tour du domaine, Paris, Gallimard, 182 p. ISBN 2-07-026739-3
- 1983: "Charente-Maritime" ou Les Succès d'un enfant du pays, with Maryannick Togni, Paris, Éditions Gallimard, 123 p. ISBN 2-07-060178-1
- 1984: Une Rumeur , Gallimard, 196 p. ISBN 2-07-070214-6
- 1986: Le Retour de Julie Farnèse, Gallimard, 230 p. ISBN 2-07-070476-9
- 1987: Partie de chasse au bord de la mer, Gallimard, 171 p. ISBN 2-07-070864-0
- 1988: Clara Schumann : la vie à quatre mains, Éditions Robert Laffont, coll. "Elle était une fois", 283 p. ISBN 2-221-05474-1
- 1989: La Veuve Lucas s'est assise, Gallimard, 179 p. ISBN 2-07-071561-2
- 1990: Le Passeur de Loire, Gallimard, coll. "L'Un et l'autre", 183 p. ISBN 2-07-071940-5
- 1991: Trois gardiennes, Gallimard, 166 p. ISBN 2-07-072318-6

- Prix Goncourt de la nouvelle 1992

- 1993: Un geste en dentelle, Gallimard, 189 p. ISBN 2-07-073410-2
- 1995: Caspar David Friedrich : des paysages les yeux fermés, Gallimard, coll. "L'Art et l'écrivain", 179 p. ISBN 2-07-073699-7
- 1995: Josée Bethléem, followed by Femme seule à l'aquarium, Gallimard, 184 p. ISBN 2-07-074236-9
- 1997: Namokel, Éditions du Seuil, 361 p. ISBN 2-02-031955-1
- 1998: Ivoire, Éditions Gallimard, coll. "Page blanche", 46 p. ISBN 2-07-059463-7
- 1998: L'Affaire du muséum, Éditions du Seuil, coll. "Solo", 123 p. ISBN 2-02-034560-9
- 2000: Le Cahier de moleskine noire du délateur Mikhaïl, Éditions du Seuil, coll. "Solo", 139 p. ISBN 2-02-037215-0
- 2001: Le café Zimmermann, Éditions du Seuil, 268 p. ISBN 2-02-047784-X
- 2003: Des gens du monde, Éditions du Seuil, 138 p. ISBN 2-02-059104-9

- Prix Louis-Guilloux 2004

- 2003: Judith et Holopherne, with Marc de Launay and Laura Weigert, Éditions Desclée de Brouwer, coll. "Triptyque", 122 p. ISBN 2-220-05077-7
- 2005: Transactions infinies, followed by Invitation à la pleine lune, Arles, Actes Sud, coll. "Papiers", 94 p. ISBN 2-7427-5711-2
- 2005: Ces lèvres qui remuent, Éditions du Seuil, 342 p. ISBN 2-02-078773-3
- 2006: Amparo, Paris, Éditions Inventaire/Invention, coll. "En passant", 57 p. ISBN 2-914412-53-3
- 2007: Esther Mésopotamie, Éditions du Seuil, 212 p. ISBN 978-2-02-086377-3
- 2006: Entre le silence et l'œuvre, Éditions du Seuil, coll. "Réflexion", 343 p. ISBN 978-2-02-091032-3
- 2008: Ingres, ombres permanentes : belles feuilles du Musée Ingres de Montauban, exposition, Montauban, Musée Ingres, 21 March–29 June 2008 and Paris, Musée de la vie romantique, 16 September 2008 – 4 January 2009], catalogue, Paris, Le Passage, coll. "Carte blanche", 157 p. ISBN 978-2-84742-114-9
- 2008: Disparition d'un chien, Éditions du Seuil, 375 p. ISBN 978-2-02-098050-0
- 2010: Le Beau Visage de l'ennemi, Éditions du Seuil, 232 p. ISBN 978-2-02-101962-9
- 2012: L'Anglaise, Éditions du Seuil, 257 p. ISBN 978-2-02-106042-3
