= Jean-Michel Guenassia =

French writer (born 1950)

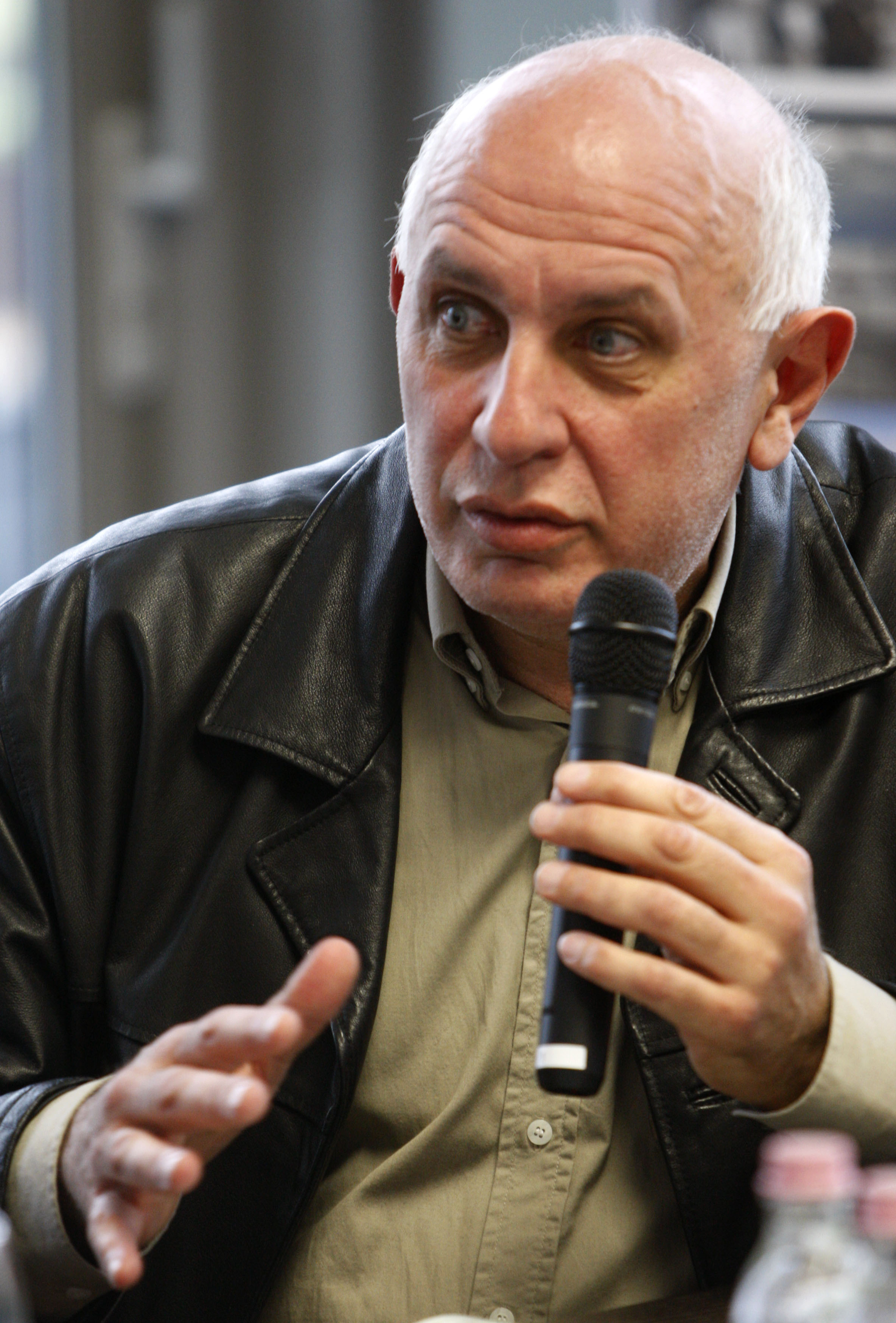
- Jean-Michel Guenassia
- Born: 1950 (age 75–76); Algiers
- Writing career
- Notable work: Le Club des incorrigibles optimistes
- Notable awards: Prix Goncourt des lycéens

Jean-Michel Guenassia (born 1950 in Algiers) is a French writer.

His novel Le Club des incorrigibles optimistes won the Prix Goncourt des lycéens in November 2009.

== Biography ==
A lawyer for six years, Jean-Michel Guenassia lived from his pen by writing screenplays for television. He published a detective novel in 1986, Pour cent millions at Éditions Liana Levi (prix Michel-Lebrun), then had some theatre plays performed, including Grand, beau, fort, avec des yeux noirs brûlants..., in 2008 at festival d'Avignon.

His publisher Albin Michel nonetheless presented Le Club des incorrigibles optimistes issued in 2009 as the first novel of a 59-year-old unknown.

In 2012, he published a second novel, La Vie rêvée d'Ernesto G.

== Works ==
=== Le Club des incorrigibles optimistes ===
Le Club des incorrigibles optimistes was published in 2009 by Éditions Albin Michel.

In this almost 800-page book, Jean-Michel Guenassia had the ambition to write both the "novel of a generation" by carefully reconstructing the 1960s (the Cold War), the Algerian question, the appearance of rock and roll etc.) and the "melancholic chronicle of an adolescence". The title is justified by the decisive location of the novel, the back room of a Parisian bistro frequented by Joseph Kessel and Jean-Paul Sartre, where there are men who fled Communism of Eastern countries (Igor, former Russian doctor threatened by the Stalinist purges, Pavel former Czech diplomat ...) but who are all "incorrigible optimists".

The novel was hailed by unanimous acclaim (Télérama, Le Point, L'Express, Le Nouvel Observateur...) and found a large audience. It was awarded the Prix Goncourt des lycéens on 9 November 2009 and the 2010 readers Prize of Notre Temps.

=== Scripts ===
- 1985: Claire obscure (TV) by Franck Appréderis, series Les Cinq Dernières Minutes, screenplay by Jean-Michel Guénassia & Frank Apprédéris
- 1990: Pour cent millions (TV) by Brigitte Sauriol, série Haute Tension, screenplay by Jean-Michel Guenassia, Michel Bouchard
- 1992 : Récidive (TV) by Franck Apprédéris, screenplay by Jean-Michel Guenassia, Bernard-Pierre Donnadieu & Franck Apprédéris

=== Theatre ===
- 1988: Le Rebelle, directed by Jean Rougerie, Théâtre Tristan-Bernard

=== Novels ===
- 1986: Pour cent millions, Éditions Liana Levi, ISBN 2-86746-019-0 (Prix du roman policier francophone de la ville du Mans), reissued under the title Dernière donne by Le Livre de Poche, ISBN 225317887X in 2014
- 2009: Le Club des incorrigibles optimistes, Albin Michel (Prix Goncourt des lycéens), Livre de Poche ISBN 2253159646
- 2012: La Vie rêvée d'Ernesto G, Albin Michel, ISBN 2226242953
- 2015: Trompe-la-mort, Albin Michel, Live de Poche, ISBN 2253068675
- 2016: La Valse des arbres et du ciel, Albin Michel, ISBN 2226328750
- 2017: De l’influence de David Bowie sur la destinée des jeunes filles, Albin Michel
- 2021: Les Terres promises, Albin Michel
