= Frédéric Valabrègue =

Frédéric Valabrègue (12 January 1952, Marseille) is a French writer, author of four novels, three autobiographical narratives and numerous writings on art. In 2011, he received the Prix Louis-Guilloux for his novel Le Candidat. His books are mostly published by Éditions P.O.L

In addition, he teaches art history at Beaux-Arts de Marseille-Luminy.

== Works ==
- 1984: Vues d’abandon, Lettres de Casse
- 1985: Rumeur, Collodion
- 1989: La Ville sans nom, novel, POL
- 1992: Agricole et Béchamel, novel, POL
- 1994: J’ai découvert un nouveau monde, Kazimir Sévérinovitch Malévitch, biographie, Images en manœuvres,
- 1994: Alexandre Bonnier, peintre et écrivain, monography written in collaboration with Bernard Lattay, Editions Voix Richard Meier
- 1998: Le Vert-Clos, narration, POL
- 2002: Asthme, narration, POL
- 2005: Les Mauvestis, novel, POL
- 2005: Georges Autard, interview with Pierre Manuel, Grandes Méridianes
- 2009: Carlos Kusnir, art book, Analogues
- 2010: Ceccarelli, art book, André Dimanche
- 2010: Le candidat, novel, POL
- 2015: Grant'autre, narration, POL
