= Sylvain Prudhomme =

French writer (born 1979)

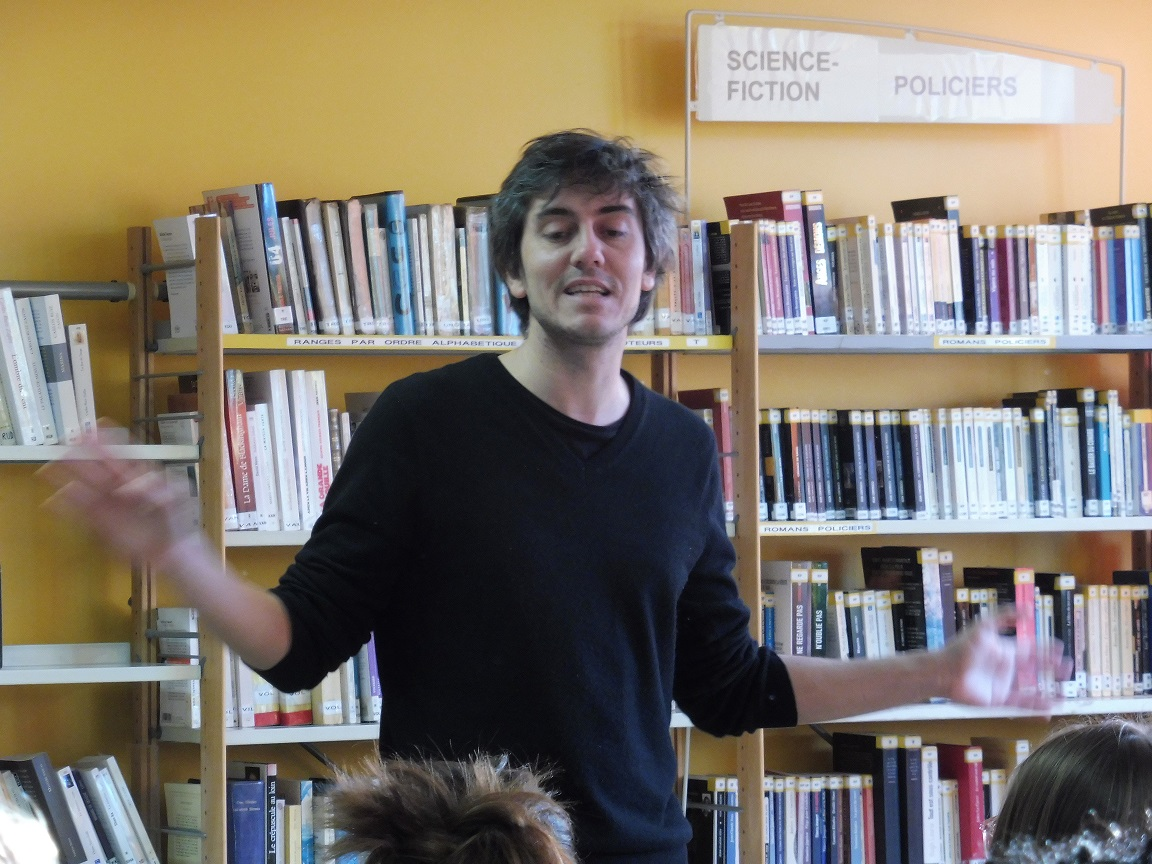
Prudhomme in 2018

Sylvain Prudhomme (French: [silvɛ̃ pʁydɔm]; born 1979, La Seyne-sur-Mer) is a French writer.

He is the author of novels and reports, many of which are based in contemporary Africa, where he lived and worked. His novel Les Grands (ed. L'Arbalète, Gallimard) was designated "French Revelation of the year 2014" by the editorial staff of the magazine Lire.

In 2019 his novel Par les routes won the Prix Femina, one of the most important French literary prizes.

== Biography ==
Sylvain Prudhomme spent his childhood in different African countries (Cameroon, Burundi, Niger, and Mauritius) before studying literature in Paris and then directing the Franco-Senegalese Alliance of Ziguinchor in Senegal from 2010 to 2012.

He collaborated with the magazines Geste and Le Tigre.

== Works ==
Novels

- 2007: Les matinées d'Hercule, Serpent à plumes
- 2010: L'affaire Furtif, Burozoïque, (with drawings by Lætitia Bianchi).
- 2010: Tanganyika Project, Léo Scheer
- 2012: Là, avait dit Bahi, L'Arbalète, Gallimard

- Prix Louis-Guilloux.

- 2014: Les Grands, L'Arbalète, Gallimard

- "Révélation française de l'année 2014" in the ranking of the best books of the year of magazine Lire
- Prix Georges Brassens 2014.
- Prix Climax, Musique et Littérature 2014 (prize established by the bookstore Lucioles in Vienne (38) and C'rock radio.
- Prix de la Porte Dorée 2015

- 2016: Légende, L’Arbalète, Gallimard
- 2018: L'Affaire Furtif, L’Arbalète, Gallimard
- 2019: Par les routes, L’Arbalète, Gallimard

-Prix Femina
-Prix Landerneau

Novellas

- 2020: Les orages, L’Arbalète, Gallimard

Reports

- 2010: Africaine Queen. Dans les salons de coiffure de Château d'eau, éd. Le Tigre
- 2011: La vie dans les arbres, followed by Sur les bidonvilles, les cabanes et la construction sauvage, éd. Le Tigre

Translations

- 2009: John Reed, Pancho Villa, Allia
- 2011: Ngugi Wa Thiong'o, Décoloniser l'esprit, La Fabrique
