= Paolo Woods =

Dutch-Canadian photographer (born 1970)

- Born: August 18, 1970 (age 56); The Hague, Netherlands
- Occupation: Documentary photographer
- Awards: World Press Photo 2005 General News, World Press Photo 2012 Daily Life, Premio Ponchielli 2008
- Website: paolowoods.com

Paolo Woods (born August 18, 1970) is a Dutch–Canadian photographer, director, curator and teacher. He mainly works on long-term projects combining photography with investigative journalism. He is a contributing photographer for National Geographic and his work is regularly published worldwide in magazines such as Time, Le Monde, Geo, Internazionale, Newsweek, etc.

His work has been shown in solo exhibitions in France, the United States, Germany, Switzerland, China, Haiti, Italy, Belgium, the Netherlands, and Spain, as well as numerous group shows around the world.

His photographs are in private and public collections including the Musée de l'Élysée (Lausanne), the Bibliothèque nationale de France, the FNAC, the Saud bin Muhammed Al Thani collection (Qatar), the Servais collection (Brussels), the UniCredit Art Collection, The MAST Collection. Between 2022 and 2025 he has been the artistic director of the photo festival Cortona On The Move.

== Biography ==
Paolo Woods grew up in Italy in a Dutch-Canadian family. From 1991 to 2000 he ran a black and white professional photo lab and a photography gallery in Florence named Print. In 1999 he turned to documentary photography and went to Iran to document the reforms President Khatami was trying to implement. There he met the writer and journalist Serge Michel. From 2000 to 2002, together with Michel, Woods travelled through twelve countries – among them the United States, Iraq, Angola, Kazakhstan and Russia – following the route of oil production and trade, conducting a behind-the-scenes investigation of the industry. In 2002 and 2004 they worked in Afghanistan and Iraq, producing a detailed reportage on the westerners' debacle there that eventually became the book American Chaos. In the same years, Woods, Michel and Claude Baechtold founded Riverboom, a collective and publisher, later joined by Gabriele Galimberti and Edoardo Delille.

In 2005 Woods won his first World Press Photo award in General News.

In 2007 and 2008 Woods worked across Africa documenting the birth of "Chinafrica", (Note: Chinafrica, anglicizing of the French term Chinafrique, itself a blend of Chine and Afrique.) the spectacular rise of the Chinese who were then massively investing in Africa and had changed the geopolitical order (see Africa–China economic relations). The resulting book, coauthored with Serge Michel and Michel Beuret, has been translated to eleven languages and has been acclaimed as the most thorough investigation of the phenomenon, and as an example of art and documentary photography united. It sold more than 40,000 copies in France alone.

In 2010 Woods completed the work Marche sur mes yeux, an intimate portrait of Iran, hoping to overcome the stereotyped vision of the country and show the complexity of its identities. The photographs were widely published and exhibited in galleries and festivals such as the Rencontres d'Arles in France and Festival Images Vevey in Switzerland.

In 2010 Woods moved to Haiti. For four years he worked there on the project State, which recounts the islanders' experience and describes the dynamics at work in all the developing countries: international organisations versus local government, civil society versus executive power, private versus public money. The project grew three-dimensional in Haiti including a book, coauthored with a prize-winning Swiss journalist Arnaud Robert, that was translated into Haitian Creole, an exhibition outside Faculté d'Ethnologie (Université d'État d'Haïti) of Port-au-Prince and the outdoor installations across the city realised with the support of local artists. The first exhibition of the project in Europe was hosted at the Musée de l'Élysée in Lausanne.

In 2012 he received his second World Press Photo award in the Daily Life section for his reportage on the importance of the radio network in Haiti.

In an interview with the New York Times, Woods said about his work:

Photojournalists tend to divide the world into good and bad. You constantly find those two elements that we so clearly think define our vision of the world. But things are a lot more mixed. There are not just bad guys and good guys. That is what is interesting to me, to get into the nuances and make images that are not answers, but raise more questions.

In 2013 Woods and Robert published another book set in Haiti, Pèpè.

In 2014, in collaboration with an Italian photographer, Gabriele Galimberti, Woods completed The Heavens, an investigation into tax havens. This premiered with an exhibition at Rencontres d'Arles in 2015 and has toured worldwide to both critic and public acclaim. The photobook was chosen as among the best of 2015 by Martin Parr, by three curators for LensCulture, and by Holly Stuart Hughes for Photo District News.

In 2021 in collaboration with writer Arnaud Robert he released the project HAPPY PILLS, a 5-year investigation in the relationship between the pharmaceutical industry and consumers that questions whether happiness can be prescribed. For HAPPY PILLS he followed consumers in the United States, Switzerland, Niger, Israel, Peru, Portugal, India and Italy. The project takes the form of: a book published by Delpire; a film, Happy Pills, released in 2022, produced by Arte and Intermezzo, that premiered at the Festival dei popoli in Florence; an exhibition that toured worldwide, such as Switzerland, Italy, Japan.

== Published works ==
=== Books by Paolo Woods ===
- Serge Enderlin, Serge Michel (text); Paolo Woods (photographs). Un monde de brut.
  - Un monde de brut: Sur les routes de l'or noir. Paris: Le Seuil, 2003. ISBN 978-2020604901. Text in French.
  - Pianeta petrolio: Sulle rotte dell'oro nero. Milano: Il Saggiatore, 2004. ISBN 9788842812135. Translation into Italian.
- Serge Michel (text), Paolo Woods (photographs). American chaos.
  - American chaos: Retour en Afghanistan et en Iraq (2002–2004). Paris: Le Seuil, 2004. ISBN 2020638975. Text in French.
  - Caos americano: Nel cuore della crisi: Afghanistan e Iraq 2002–2004. Rome: Contrasto Due, 2004. ISBN 8889032553. Translation into Italian.
- Serge Michel, Michel Beuret (text); Paolo Woods (photographs). La Chinafrique.
  - La Chinafrique: Pékin à la conquête du continent noir. Paris: Grasset, 2008. ISBN 9782246736219. Text in French.
    - La Chinafrique: Pékin à la conquête du continent noir. Paris: Grasset, 2009. ISBN 9782012794795. Updated and expanded edition.
    - La Chinafrique: Pékin à la conquête du continent noir. Paris: Fayard, 2010. ISBN 9782818501085. Updated and expanded edition.
  - China safari: On the trail of Beijing's expansion in Africa. New York: Nation, 2009. ISBN 9781568584263. Translation into English.
  - Cinafrica: Pechino alla conquista del continente nero. Milan: Il Saggiatore, 2009. ISBN 9788842815440. Translation into Italian.
  - China en África: Pekín a la conquista del continente africano. Madrid: Alianza Editorial, 2009. ISBN 9788420682655. Translation into Spanish.
  - 中国的非洲 中国正在征服黑色大陆. Beijing: 中信出版集团股份, 2009. ISBN 9787508616360. Translation into Chinese.
  - 黑暗大布局 中國的非洲經濟版圖. Taipei: 早安財經文化, 2010. ISBN 9866613143; ISBN 9789866613142. Translation into Chinese.
  - アフリカを食い荒らす中国. Tokyo: Kawade Shobō Shinsha, 2009. ISBN 9784309245003. Translation into Japanese.
  - 차이나프리카 중국은 아프리카에서 무슨 일을 벌이고 있는가 = Chinafrica. 에코리브르. ISBN 9788962630152. Translation into Korean.
- Gabriele Galimberti, Wang Wei, Claude Baechtold, Paolo Woods. Beijing. Yverdon: Riverboom, 2008. ISBN 9782970058533.
- Pieter Hugo, Mikhael Subotzky, Paolo Woods. Three Stories. Luxembourg: Centre national de l'audiovisuel, 2009. ISBN 9782919873043. Woods contributes "La Chinafrique".
- Regina Maria Anzenberger (editor); Annet van den Voort, Paolo Woods, Yadid Levi, Toni Anzenberger (photographers). West. Heidelberg: Kehrer, 2010. ISBN 9783868280678.
- Paolo Woods, Serge Michel. Marche sur mes yeux.
  - Marche sur mes yeux: Portrait de l'Iran aujourd'hui. Paris: Grasset, 2010. ISBN 978-2246757610. Text in French.
  - Puedes pisar mis ojos: Un retrato del Irán actual. Madrid: Alianza Editorial, 2011. ISBN 9788420651255. Translation into Spanish.
  - Land des Lachens: Land der Tränen: Die vielen Gesichter des Iran: Ein Porträt. Munich: Riemann, 2011. ISBN 9783570501313. Translation into German.
  - Translation into Persian, freely downloadable as a PDF file. (Note: High-resolution version (11.4 MB), low-resolution version (3.7 MB); both linked from لینک دانلود رایگان, marchesurmesyeux.fr; as archived by the Wayback Machine on August 4, 2012.)
- Paolo Woods (photographs), Arnaud Robert (text). State.
  - État. Arles: Éd. Photosynthèses; Lausanne: Musée de l'Élysée, 2013. ISBN 9782363980076. Text in French.
  - State. Arles: Éd. Photosynthèses; Lausanne: Musée de l'Élysée, 2013. ISBN 9782883500990. Translation into English.
  - Leta. [Haiti]: Edisyon Fokal, 2014. ISBN 9789997041609. Translation into Haitian Creole.
- Paolo Woods, Ben Depp, Josué Azor (photographs); Arnaud Robert (text). Pèpè. [Vevey]: Riverboom; Lausanne: Musée de l’Elysée, 2013. ISBN 978-2883501003.
- Paolo Woods, Gabriele Galimberti. The Heavens. With an essay by Nicholas Shaxson.
  - Les paradis: Rapport annuel. Paris: Delpire, 2015. ISBN 9782851072757. Text in French.
  - The Heavens: Annual Report. Southport: Dewi Lewis, 2015. ISBN 978-1905928125. Translation into English.
- Arnaud Robert, Paolo Woods. Happy Pills, le bonheur en pilules. Paris: Delpire, 2021. ISBN 9791095821366. Text in French.

=== National Geographic publications ===
- What Makes a Genius?, May 2017 issue
- Where Street Vendors Run Pharmacies Out of Buckets, June 2017 issue
- How Picasso's Journey From Prodigy to Icon Revealed a Genius, May 2018 issue
- Leonardo da Vinci Artistic brilliance endures 500 years after death, May 2019 issue
- See where Leonardo da Vinci still walks the streets
