= Léonora Miano =

Cameroonian author (born 1973)

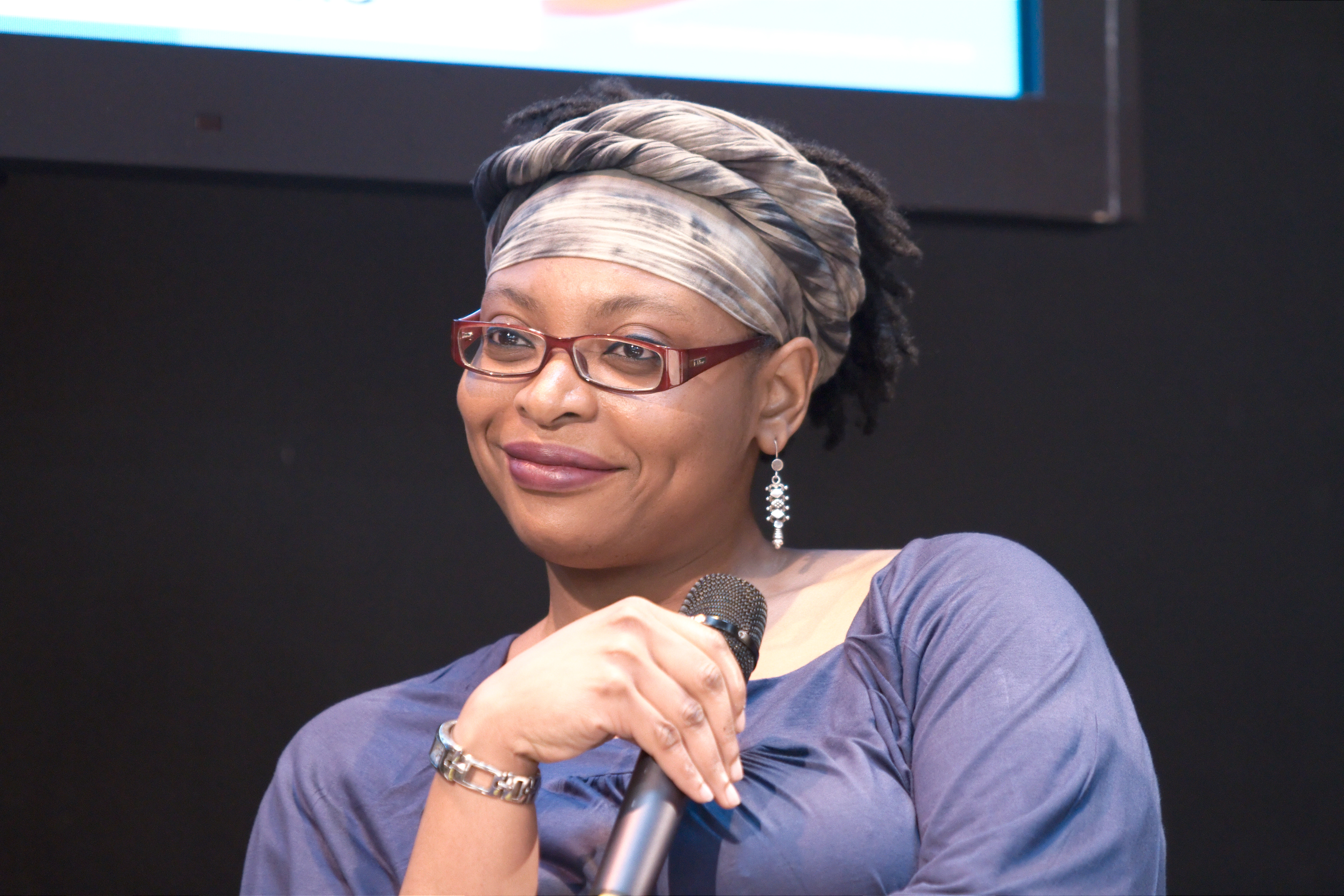
- Miano in 2010
- Born: 12 March 1973 (age 52); Douala
- Language: French language
- Notable awards: Prix Goncourt des Lycéens, Prix René-Fallet,, Officier of the Ordre des Arts et des Lettres,

Website
- www.leonoramiano.com

Léonora Miano (born 1973, in Douala) is a Cameroonian author.

== Biography ==
Léonora Miano was born in Douala in Cameroon. She moved to France in 1991, where she first settled in Valenciennes and then in Nanterre to study American Literature. She published her first novel, Dark Heart of the Night, which was well received by French critics, receiving six prizes: Les Lauriers Verts de la Forêt des Livres, Révélation (2005), the Louis Guilloux prize (2006), the Prix du Premier Roman de Femme (2006), the René-Fallet prize (2006), the Bernard-Palissy prize (2006), and the Cameroonian Excellence prize (2007). The Lire magazine awarded it with the title of the best first French novel in 2005.

Her second novel, Contours du jour qui vient, received the Goncourt des lycéens prize, which was discerned by a jury of young high schoolers between the ages of 15 and 18.

In the spring of 2008, Léonora Miano published five novels in the « Étonnants classiques » collection of the Flammarion Group. The novels are grouped under the title, Afropean et autres nouvelles.

According to Daniel S. Larangé, Miano's work has the particularity of creating an afropéenne literature that is aware of the transformations of the world and of humanity. She defends the afropéenne identity at a time of globalization, which could regenerate French culture through the bias French-speaking literature. Daniel S. Larangé also adds that "jazzy writing" is based on a popular and musical culture that integrates impromptu rhythms and rhapsodies specific to jazz.

In 2013, Léonora Miano won the Prix Femina for La Saison de l'Ombre which recounts, in keeping with Yambo Ouologuem's Devoir de Violence, the beginning of the slave trade. The novel, rich in emotions, would be a parable of globalization which leads to the exploitation of humanity as a product of consumption.

In 2015, she directed the collective work Volcaniques: une anthologie du plaisir in which twelve women authors of the black world, Hemley Boum, Nafissatou Dia Diouf, Marie Dô, Nathalie Etoke, Gilda Gonfier, Axelle Jah Njiké, Fabienne Kanor, Gaël Octavia, Gisèle Pineau, Marie-Laure Endale, Elizabeth Tchoungui and Léonora Miano herself have written short stories around this theme.

In 2018, Satoshi Miyagi directed Révélation, the first part of a trilogy on the history of slavery called Red in Blue, published in 2011. Léonora Miano, a specialist in the colonial event, chose Satoshi Miyagi as the director because his Japanese culture is distant from the history of transatlantic slavery. It was the writer's desire to avoid "cultural appropriation" by a Westerner. The contrast between the familiar story for a Western spectator and the aesthetic distance (dissociation of voice and body inherited from Japanese theatre) creates a surprise and goes beyond the confrontation between Africa and Europe.

Her writing has won several literary awards, including the Louis Guilloux Prize (2006), the Montalembert Prize (2006), the René Fallet Prize (2006), the Bernard Palissy Prize (2006), the Prix Goncourt des Lycéens (2006) and the Prix Fémina (2013).

She criticized the foreword added to the English translation of her 2005 first novel, Dark Heart of the Night, calling it "full of lies"; in 2012 Zukiswa Wanner, however, based on reading Dark Heart of the Night rated Miano as one of her top five African writers (alongside H. J. Golakai, Ondjaki, Chika Unigwe and Thando Mgqolozana), describing Miano's work as "brilliant".

== Awards ==
- 2006: Prix Goncourt des Lycéens
- 2006: Prix Louis-Guilloux
- 2006: Montalembert Prize
- 2006: Bernard Palissy Prize
- 2006: René Fallet Prize
- 2011: Grand prix littéraire d'Afrique noire
- 2012: Prix Seligmann
- 2013: Grand prix du roman métis
- 2013: Prix Fémina

== Works ==
- L'Intérieur de la nuit, Plon, 2005; Pocket, 2006, ISBN 2-266-16268-3
  - Dark Heart of the Night (translated by Tamsin Black), University of Nebraska Press, 2010, ISBN 978-0-8032-1567-2
- Contours du jour qui vient, Plon, 2006, ISBN 2-259-20396-5; Pocket Jeunesse 2008; Pocket 2008, ISBN 2-266-17694-3
- Afropean Soul, Flammarion, 2008, ISBN 2-08-120959-4
- Tels des astres éteints, Plon, 2008, ISBN 2-259-20628-X
- Soulfood équatoriale, Robert Laffont, 2009, ISBN 978-2-84111-380-4
- Les Aubes écarlates, Plon, 2009, ISBN 978-2-259-21067-6
- Blues pour Elise, Plon, 2010, ISBN 978-2-259-21286-1
- Ces âmes chagrines, Plon, 2011 ISBN 978-2-259-21287-8
- Écrits pour la parole, L'Arche éditeur, 2012 ISBN 978-2-85181-773-0
- Habiter la frontière, L'Arche éditeur, 2012 ISBN 978-2-85181-786-0
- La Saison de l'ombre, Grasset, 2013 ISBN 978-2-246-80113-9 – Prix Femina 2013
  - Season of the Shadow (translated by Gila Walker), Seagull Books, 2018, ISBN 978-0-8574-2480-8
- Crépuscule du tourment, Grasset, 2016 ISBN 978-2-246-85414-2
- L’impératif transgressif , L'Arche éditeur, 2016 (ISBN 978-2-85181-893-5)7
- Crépuscule du tourment 2 Héritage, Grasset, 2017 (ISBN 978-2-246-85446-3)
- Rouge impératrice Grasset, 2019, (ISBN 978-2-246-81360-6)
- Stardust, Grasset, 2022
