= Clara Dupont-Monod =

French journalist and woman of letters

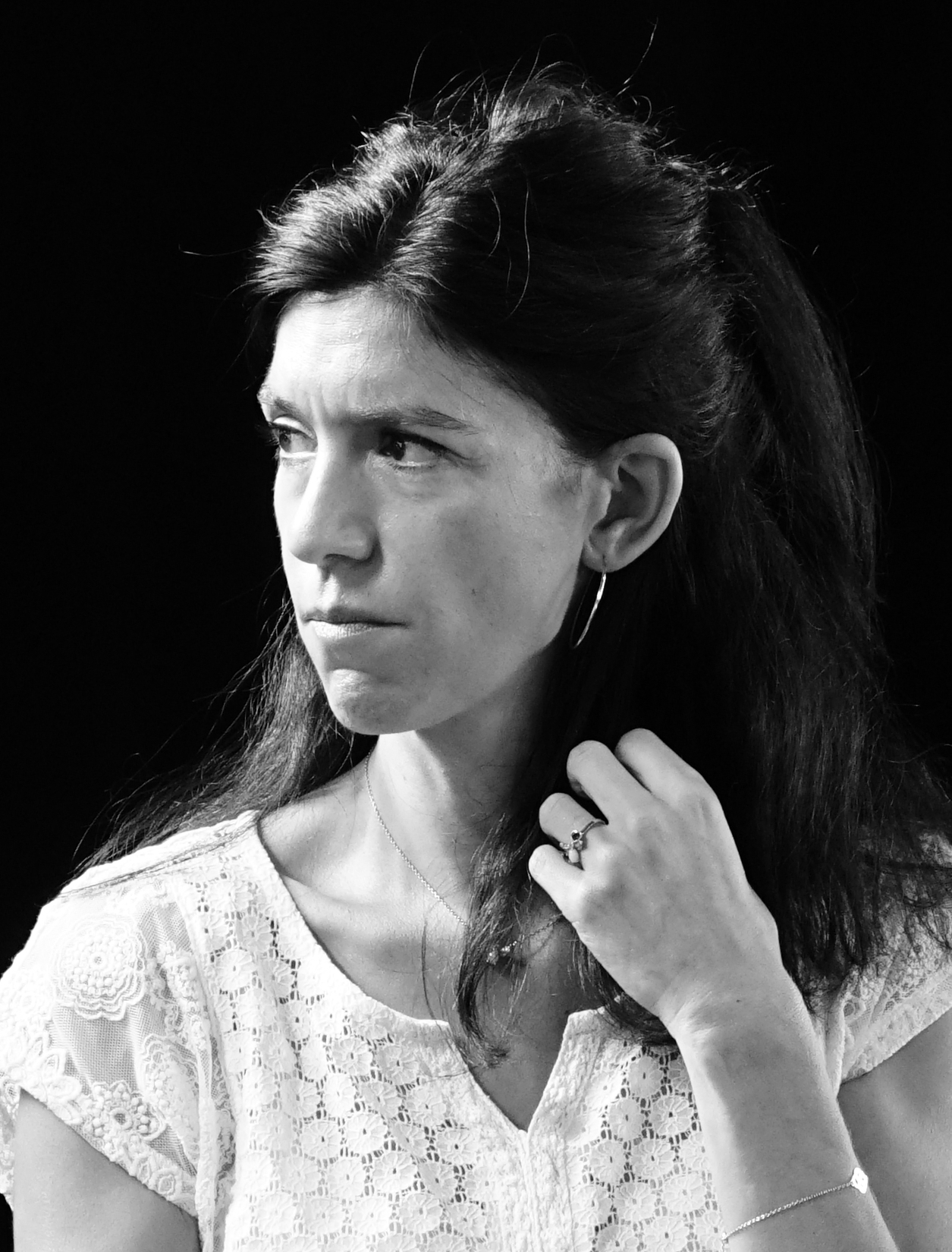
- 2018
- Born: 7 October 1973 (age 52); Paris, France
- Occupations: Journalist; novelist
- Writing career
- Language: French
- Years active: 1998–present
- Notable awards: Prix Femina (2021)

Clara Dupont-Monod (born 7 October 1973, in Paris) is a French journalist and woman of letters. She was awarded the Prix Femina in 2021.

== Journalism ==
She began her career as a journalist for the magazine Cosmopolitan, joining the staff of Marianne as a senior reporter at age 24. In 2007, she became editor-in-chief of the cultural pages of Marianne. At the same time, she regularly conducted interviews that were broadcast on RTL radio in the programme On refait le monde and presented by Nicolas Poincaré.

On 31 August 2009, Dupont-Monod joined the staff of the La Matinale programme on Canal+. In the autumn of 2011, she was one of the columnists of the radio show Les Affranchis on France Inter.

At the beginning of 2012, she presented the literary programme Clara et les chics livres, every Saturday on France Inter, accompanied by two columnists. During the year 2013-2014, she conducted the political interview of 7:50 of the matinale on France Inter, presented by Patrick Cohen, replacing Pascale Clark. At the beginning of 2014, she was replaced by Léa Salamé.

Since September 2014, Dupont-Monod has been hosting a literary column in the news programme Si tu écoutes, j'annule tout on France Inter.

== Novels ==
Dupont-Monod has also written several novels. Her first work, Eova Luciole, was published in 1998. Her novel La Folie du roi Marc explores the forgotten husband of Yseut, drawn from the myth of Tristan and Iseult. Histoire d'une prostituée tells about the daily life and character of a prostitute, whom the writer met and followed for a year.

Her fourth novel, La Passion selon Juette (2007), describes the struggle of a twelfth-century woman who refuses the dictates of a world in which women were constrained by an all-powerful Church. She drew from the biography of Yvette of Huy, written in medieval Latin by her friend, the religious Hugues de Floreffe. This novel was awarded the prix Laurent-Bonelli Virgin-Lire in its first year. The novel was nominated to the Prix Feminas list. It was a finalist on the short list of nominations for the 2007 Prix Goncourt.

In 2011 she published Nestor rend les armes, a novel about an obese man. This novel was a finalist in the first selection for the 2011 Prix Femina.

On 4 December 2014 Dupont-Monod was awarded the prize of the magazine Point de vue, for her book on Eleanor of Aquitaine, Le roi disait que j'étais diable. It was also awarded the Prix Maurice Genevoix.

In 2021, she published And the Stones Cry Out (S'adapter), a novel about siblings and disability. It was a finalist in the second selection for the 2021 prix Goncourt, and was awarded the 2021 Prix Femina.

== Bibliography ==
=== Novels ===
- 1998: Eova Luciole, Éditions Grasset, ISBN 2246563615
- 2000: La folie du roi Marc, Grasset, ISBN 2246593115
- 2003: Histoire d'une prostituée, Grasset, ISBN 2246646219
- 2007: La Passion selon Juette, Grasset, ISBN 9782246615712
- 2008: (Collaboration ) Bains de nuit, with Catherine Guetta (author), Fayard
- 2011: Nestor rend les armes, Paris, Sabine Wespieser Éditeur, ISBN 9782848051000
- 2014: Le roi disait que j’étais diable, Grasset, ISBN 978-2-246-85385-5, Prix Maurice Genevoix
- 2018: La Révolte, Éditions Stock, ISBN 978-2234085060
- 2021: S'adapter, Éditions Stock, ISBN 978-2-234-08954-9, Prix Femina
  - 2024: And the Stones Cry Out, MacLehose Press, ISBN 978-1-5294-3536-8

=== Video ===
- (Co-screenwriter) Sans état d'âme, 2008, TF1
