= Sylvie Germain =

French author (born 1954)

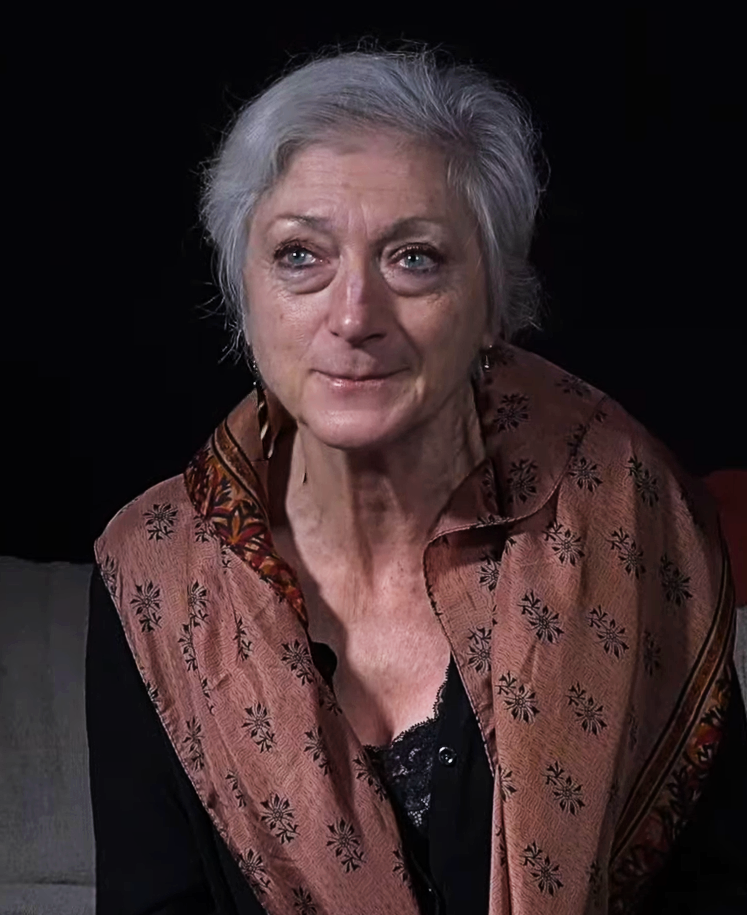
Sylvie Germain

Sylvie Germain (French pronunciation: [silvi ʒɛʁmɛ̃]; born 1954 Châteauroux, Indre) is a French author.

== Early life and education ==
During her childhood, with her three brothers and sisters, she moved from city to city, depending on the assignments her sub-prefect father received.

In 1976 she received her master's degree in philosophy from the Sorbonne, Paris, and in 1978 went on to complete an MA in philosophy and aesthetics at Université de Paris X - Nanterre, where she completed a doctorate in philosophy in 1981. During those years she studied with a teacher she admires, Emmanuel Levinas, and her work focused on the notion of asceticism in Christian mysticism.

== Work ==
While employed by the Ministry of Culture in Paris, where she remained between 1981 and 1986, she produced her first novel, Le Livre des Nuits (The Book of Nights) in 1985. It won six French Literary Prizes. The reception of the book established her as a significant new author.

From Paris, she moved to Prague, Czechoslovakia, where, from 1987 to 1993, she taught philosophy at the French School, and continued to write.

In 1993, Sylvie Germain returned to France. She then lived between Paris and La Rochelle. But Prague continued to inspire her, a theme especially apparent in the novel Immensités, as well as the cultural life of the Czech Republic more generally, as reflected in her meditation on the life and work of Bohuslav Reynek. Since 1994 she has been involved only in literary activities.

In 1999, Sylvie Germain produced a biography focusing on the life of Etty Hillesum, the young Dutch Jewish woman who was murdered at Auschwitz in November 1943, leaving behind a journal. Germain explored her spiritual life and, a year later, she published several books in various genres: a travelogue, a spiritual text and a photo album.

In addition to novels, she has published essays on other artists (Vermeer: Patience et songe de lumière, 1993, for example), spiritual meditations (Les Echos du Silence) and a children's book (L'Encre du Poulpe). Most of her novels have been translated into English.

== Awards and honours ==
- 1989 Prix Femina for Jours de Colère
- 1993 Scott Moncrieff Prize for the English translation of The Book of Nights (Le Livre des Nuits)
- 2005 Prix Goncourt des Lycéens for Magnus
- 2016 Prix mondial Cino Del Duca
- 2024 Park Kyong-ni Prize

== Bibliography ==
- Le Livre des Nuits (Éditions Gallimard, 1984)
  - The Book of Nights: a novel. translated by Christine Donougher. David R. Godine Publ. 1993. ISBN 978-0-87923-975-6.
- Nuit d'Ambre (Gallimard, 1986)
  - Night of Amber. translated by Christine Donougher. David R. Godine Publ. 2000. ISBN 978-1-56792-090-1. "sylvie germain."
- Opéra muet (Maren Sell, 1989)
- Jours de colère (Gallimard, 1989), Prix Femina 1989
  - Days of Anger, translated by Christine Donougher (Dedalus, 1993) ISBN 9781873982655
- La Pleurante des rues de Prague (Gallimard, 1991)
  - The Weeping Woman on the Streets of Prague, translated by Judith Landry (Dedalus, 1993) ISBN 978-1-873982-70-9
- L'Enfant Méduse (Gallimard, 1992)
  - The Medusa Child, translated by Liz Nash (Dedalus, 1994) ISBN 978-1-873982-31-0
- Vermeer- Patience et songe de lumière (Flohic, 1993)
- Immensités (Gallimard, 1993)
  - Infinite Possibilities, translated by Liz Nash (Dedalus, 1998) ISBN 978-1-873982-23-5
- Éclats de sel (Gallimard, 1996)
  - Invitation to a journey: éclats de sel, translated by Christine Donougher (Dedalus, 2003) ISBN 978-1-903517-16-1
- Les Échos du silence (Desclée de Brouwer,1996)
- Céphalophores (Gallimard, 1997)
- Tobie des marais (Gallimard, 1998)
  - The book of Tobias, translated by Christine Donougher (Dedalus, 2000) ISBN 978-1-873982-39-6
- Bohuslav Reynek à Petrkov (Christian Pirot, 1998)
- L'Encre du poulpe (Gallimard Jeunesse, 1999)
- Etty Hillesum (Pygmalion Gérard Watelet, 1999)
- Cracovie à vol d'oiseaux (Éditions du Rocher, 2000)
- Mourir un peu (Desclée de Brouwer, 2000)
- Grande nuit de Toussaint (Le Temps qu'il fait, 2000)
- Célébration de la Paternité (Albin Michel, 2001)
- Le vent ne peut être mis en cage (Alice, 2002)
- Chanson des mal-aimants (Gallimard, 2002)
  - The Song of False Lovers, translated by Christine Donougher (Dedalus, 2004) ISBN 978-1-903517-25-3
- Couleurs de l’invisible (Al Manar, 2002)
- Songes du temps (Desclée de Brouwer, 2003)
- Les personnages (Gallimard, 2004)
- Ateliers de lumière (Desclée de Brouwer, 2004)
- Magnus, (Albin Michel, 2005), ISBN 978-2-226-16734-7 Prix Goncourt des Lycéens 2005.
  - Magnus, translated by Christine Donougher (Dedalus, 2008) ISBN 978-1-903517-62-8
- Frères (Huitième Jour, 2006)
- L'Inaperçu (Albin Michel, 2008)
  - Hidden Lives, translated by Mike Mitchell (Dedalus Limited, 2010) ISBN 978-1-903517-92-5
- Hors-champ (Albin Michel, 2009)
- Patinir, Paysage avec Saint Christoph (Éditions Invenit, 2010)
- Quatre actes de présence (Desclée de Brouwer, 2011)
- Chemin de croix (Bayard Centurion, 2011)
- Le monde sans vous (Albin Michel, 2011), Prix Jean-Monnet de littérature européenne du département de Charente
- Rendez-vous nomades (Albin Michel, 2012)
- Petites scènes capitales (Albin Michel, 2013), Shortlisted for the Prix Mauvais genres 2013
- À la table des hommes (Albin Michel, 2016)
