= Grémillon =

Grémillon is a French surname. Notable people with the surname include:

- Hélène Grémillon (born 1977), French author
- Jean Grémillon (1901–1959), French film director

== See also ==
- Gremillion
