= Prix Emmanuel Roblès =

French literary award

The Prix Emmanuel Roblès, readers's prize of Blois, is a French literary award established in 1990 whose aim is to reward an author of first novel. It is baptized as a tribute to writer Emmanuel Robles.

High school students, students, librarians, booksellers, members of associations, detainees in prisons or all passionate about books, come together to work on this selection, in France and abroad. The winner of the prize is awarded a 5000 € scholarship (as of 2014), which allows him to start or continue a writing project.

== Laureates ==
- 1991: Nina Bouraoui, La Voyeuse interdite, Éditions Gallimard
- 1992: Patrice Orcel, Un dilettante à la campagne, Gallimard
- 1993: Bernard Chambaz, L'Arbre de vies, Bourin éditeur
- 1994: Tobie Nathan, Saraka Bô, Payot & Rivages
- 1995: Maïté Pinero, Le Trouble des eaux, éditions Julliard.
- 1996: Christian Le Guillochet, L'Oiseau éventail, Lucien Souny
- 1997: Dominique Sigaud, L'Hypothèse du désert, Gallimard
- 1998: Bénédicte Puppinck, Éther, Éditions du Seuil
- 1999: Nicolas Michel, Un revenant, Gallimard
- 2000: Armel Job, La Femme manquée, Éditions Robert Laffont
- 2001: Philippe Besson, En l'absence des hommes, Julliard
- 2002: Soazig Aaron, Le Non de Klara, Éditions Maurice Nadeau
- 2003: Stéphane Héaume, Le Clos Lothar, Zulma
- 2004: Aminata Zaaria, La nuit est tombée sur Dakar, Éditions Grasset
- 2005: Jean-Pierre Ohl : Monsieur Dick ou le Dixième Livre, Gallimard
- 2006: Hugo Boris, Le Baiser dans la nuque, Éditions Belfond
- 2007: Carole Martinez, Le Cœur cousu, Gallimard
- 2008: Marc Lepape, Vasilsca, Galaade éditions
- 2009: Tatiana Arfel, L'Attente du soir, José Corti
- 2010: Estelle Nollet, On ne boit pas les rats-kangourous, Albin Michel
- 2011: Hélène Grémillon, Le Confident, Plon
- 2012: François Garde, Ce qu'il advint du sauvage blanc, Gallimard
- 2013: Raphaël Jerusalmy, Sauver Mozart : Le journal d'Otto J. Steiner, Actes Sud
- 2014: Nicolas Clément, Sauf les fleurs, Buchet/Chastel
- 2015: Mathias Menegoz, Karpathia, Éditions P.O.L
- 2016: Olivier Bourdeaut, En attendant Bojangles, Éditions Finitude
- 2017: Négar Djavadi, Désorientale
- 2018: Sébastien Spitzer, Ces rêves qu'on piétine
