= Nollet =

Nollet (English: /nɒˈleɪ/, French: [nɔlɛ]) is a surname, and may refer to:

- Célestin Nollet (1894–1975), Belgian footballer
- Charles Nollet (1865–1941), French general and government minister
- Estelle Nollet (born 1977), French author
- Floris Nollet (1794–1853), Belgian physicist, engineer, and inventor
- Isidore Charles Nollet (1898–1988), American-Canadian rancher and politician
- Jean-Antoine Nollet (1700–1770), French priest and physicist
