= Calonne =

Calonne may refer to:

- Charles Alexandre de Calonne (1734–1802), a French statesman
- Jacques Calonne (1930–2022), a Belgian artist, musician, and writer
- Michel Calonne (1927–2019), a French writer
- The Calonne (river), a minor tributary of the Touques (river) in Normandy
- Calonne, Wallonia, a village in the municipality of Antoing, Belgium
- Calonne-Ricouart, commune of the Pas-de-Calais department in France
- Calonne-sur-la-Lys, commune of the Pas-de-Calais department in France
