= Aminata Sophie Dièye =

Senegalese writer (1973–2016)

- Born: 1973; Thiès, Senegal
- Died: February 17, 2016 (aged 42–43)
- Occupations: Journalist; novelist; playwright
- Spouse: Lucio Mad
- Writing career
- Pen name: Aminata Zaaria; Ndèye Takhawalou
- Notable awards: Prix Emmanuel Roblès; 2004 La nuit est tombée sur Dakar

Aminata Sophie Dièye (1973 – February 17, 2016) was a Senegalese journalist, novelist, and playwright.

She is best known for her weekly newspaper column under the pen name Ndèye Takhawalou and her Prix Emmanuel Roblès-winning 2004 novel La nuit est tombée sur Dakar, published under the pseudonym Aminata Zaaria.

== Early life ==
Aminata Sophie Dièye was born in 1973 in Thiès, Senegal, into a Sufi Muslim family. Her father was a traveling tax inspector and was not present during her childhood.

At age 21, she left home, moving to the island of Ngor in Dakar. There, she began writing for the newspaper Sud Quotidien.

== Career ==
Dièye's pursuit of writing was inspired by her mother, who also loved to write. Her work has been described as "the magnifying glass that reveals society's worst vices." It also frequently exhibits a sarcastic or satirical tone, with a trademark "mix of trauma and humor."

=== Journalism ===
After working for Sud Quotidien, Dièye began writing a weekly column in L'Observateur, Senegal's most-read daily newspaper, under the pen name Ndèye Takhawalou. She would continue to write the column until her death, and it was a popular feature of the publication's Saturday issue.

She also wrote for the satirical publication Le Cafard libéré, as well as for the newspaper Tract under the pen name Miss Town.

=== Fiction ===
Dièye also began to write short fiction, and her stories were included in the anthologies Jeunes poètes du Sahel and Saison d’amour et de colère.

In 2004, she published her first novel, La nuit est tombée sur Dakar, under the pen name Aminata Zaaria. The novel tells the story of two girls from Dièye's own home region of Thiès, who flee to Dakar in an attempt to avoid becoming an old man's second or third wife. However, in the city they experience poor treatment from their new white companions and fall into hard times. La nuit est tombée sur Dakar, like much of Dièye's work, is written in a simple, direct, yet emotionally moving style. Some literary critics have described it as semi-autobiographical, with the narrator representing Dièye in her early years in the capital. La nuit est tombée sur Dakar won the 2004 Prix Emmanuel Roblès.

=== Theater ===
In 2000, Dièye wrote the play Consulat Zénéral. A satire of African society, it takes place in a French consulate, where the characters wait anxiously for visa approval. The play was performed on a tour across five African countries.

Having trained at the National Academy of Dramatic Arts in Senegal, she occasionally performed as an actress, including in the short film La Petite Vendeuse de Soleil and in her own play Consulat Zénéral.

== Personal life and death ==
Dièye was married to the French writer and director Lucio Mad. She moved to France with him in 2004. Mad died of cancer the following year, leaving her a widow at only 32 years old.

After her husband's death, Dièye returned to Senegal. His death and other traumas left her in a fragile state, and she spent time in a psychiatric hospital in Thiès, which she openly chronicled in L'Obs.

Aminata Dièye died overnight of untreated diabetes on February 17, 2016, at age 42.

She left two unpublished novels on her premature death. While there were plans to posthumously publish one of these drafts, tentatively titled L’épitaphe signée Vénus, both works remain unpublished.
