= Prix Alain-Fournier =

French literary award

The Prix Alain-Fournier is a French literary prize, awarded by the town of Saint-Amand-Montrond in honour of Alain-Fournier, author of Le Grand Meaulnes. It is intended to give encouragement to a novelist at the beginning of their career, and it can be awarded for first, second or third novels, provided that the author has not previously received any recognition at a national level.

== Prize-winners ==
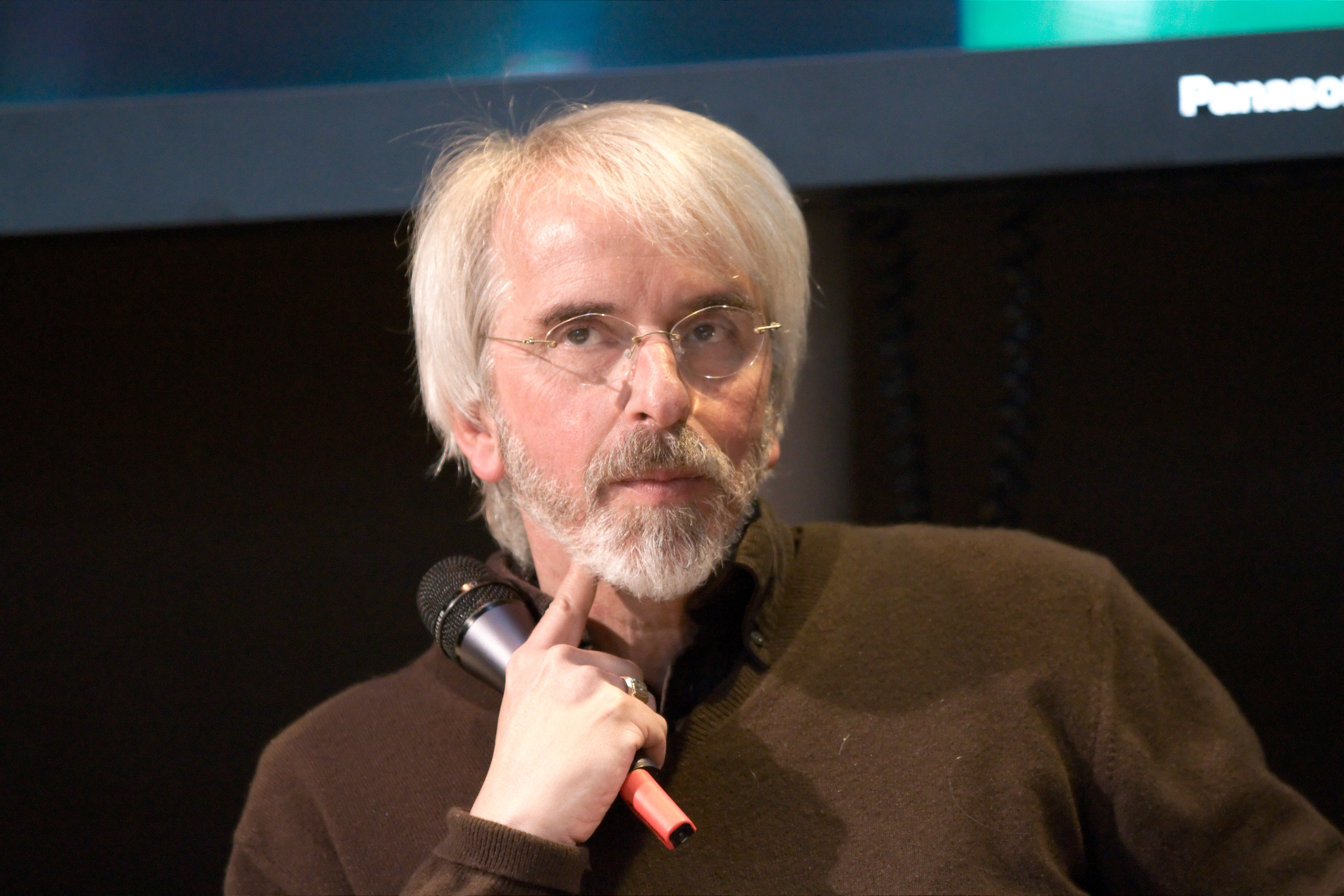
Philippe Delerm

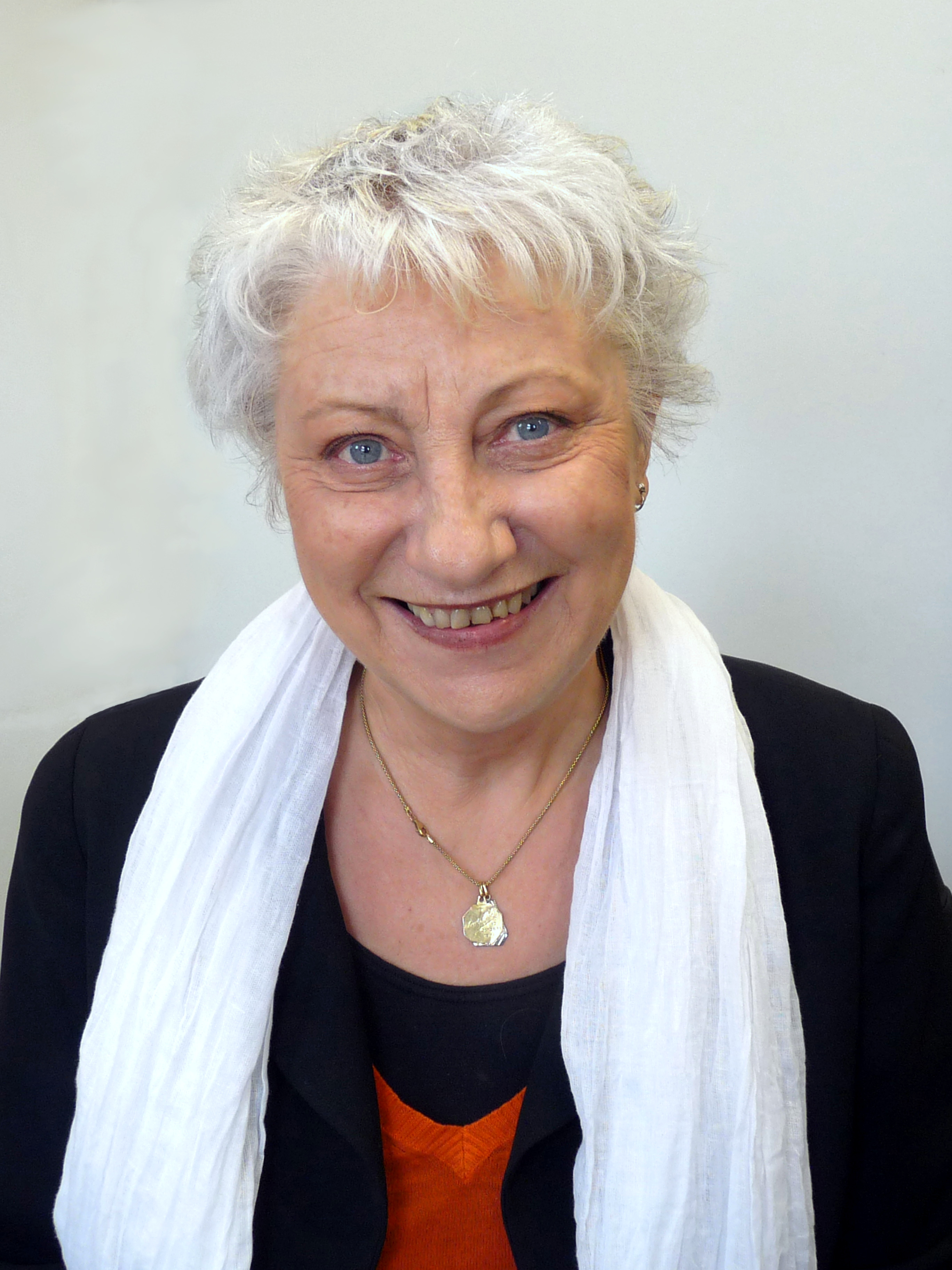
Anne-Marie Garat

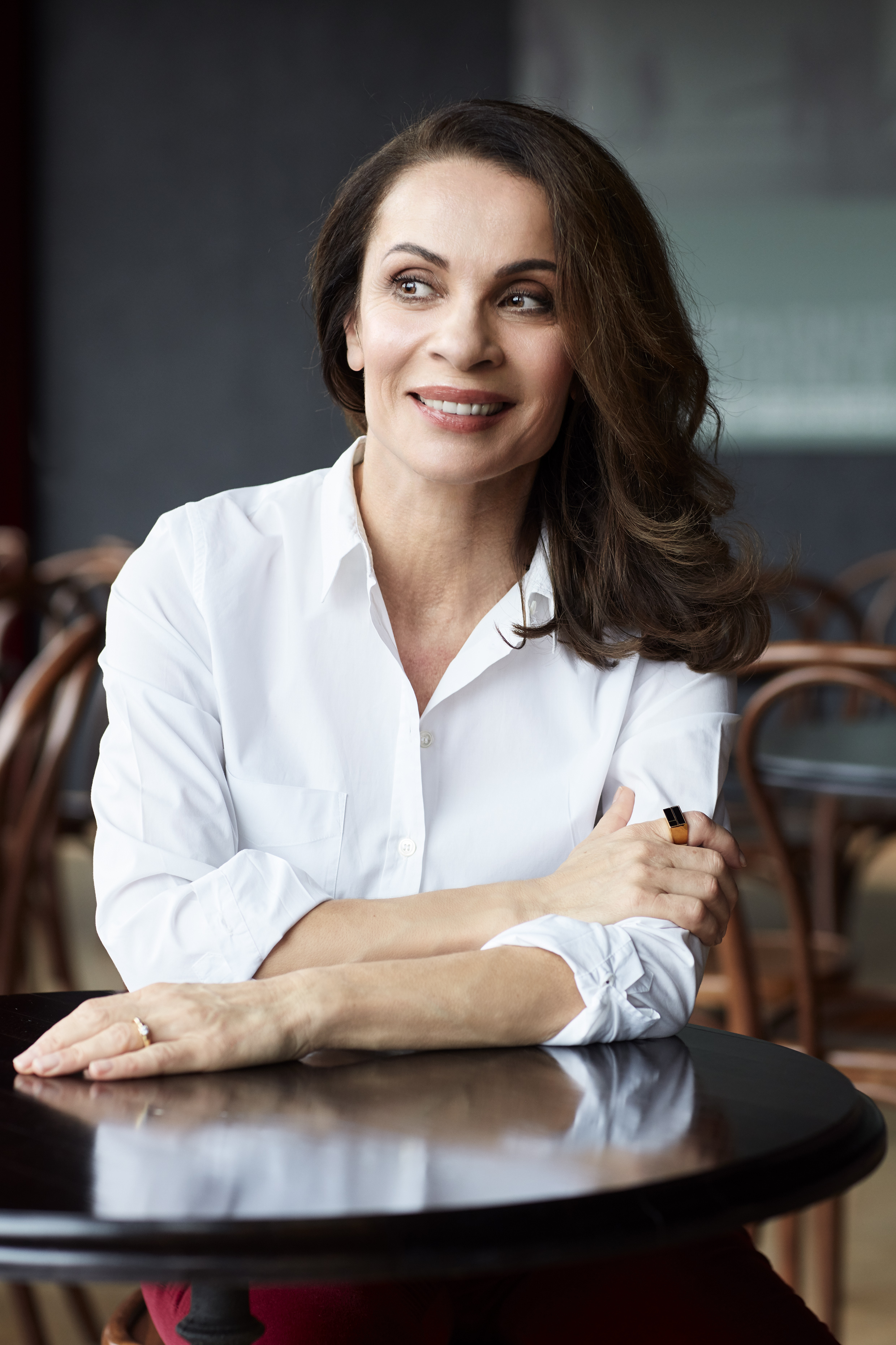
Yasmine Char

- 1986 – Pierre Bergounioux, Ce pas et le suivant (Gallimard)
- 1987 – Jean Lods, Le Bleu des vitraux (Gallimard)
- 1988 – Richard Jorif, Le Navire Argo (François Bourin)
- 1989 – Luce Tillier, L'Ordre troublant des nénuphars (Kupczyk)
- 1990 – Philippe Delerm, Autumn (Le Rocher)
- 1991 – Anne-Marie Garat, Chambre noire (Flammarion)
- 1992 – Régine Detambel, Le Long Séjour (Julliard)
- 1993 – Amélie Nothomb, Hygiène de l'assassin (Albin Michel)
- 1994 – Alain Delbe, Les Îles jumelles (Éditions Phébus)
- 1995 – Nicolas Kieffer, Peau de lapin (Seuil)
- 1996 – Xavier Hanotte, Manière noire (Belfond)
- 1997 – Dominique Sigaud, L'Hypothèse du désert (Gallimard)
- 1998 – Laurent Ardenne, Le Mal de Malifaut (Le Temps des Cerises)
- 1999 – Louis Maspero, Une île au bord du désert (L'Aube)
- 2000 – Joël Egloff, Edmond Ganglion & fils (Le Rocher)
- 2001 – Adeline Yzac, Le Dernier de la Lune (Le Rouergue)
- 2002 – Véronique Olmi, Bord de mer (Actes Sud)
- 2003 – Dominique Mainard, Leur histoire (Joëlle Losfeld)
- 2004 – Jean-Louis Serrano, Le Monde m'était promis (Editions de l'Aube)
- 2005 – Karine Mazloumian, Tanguer (Plon)
- 2006 – Hélène Bonafous-Murat, Morsures (Editions Le Passage)
- 2007 – Laurence Tardieu, Puisque rien ne dure (Editions Stock)
- 2008 – Karima Berger, Filiations dangereuses (Editions Chèvre-feuille étoilée)
- 2009 – Yasmine Char, La main de Dieu (Gallimard)
- 2010 – Tatiana Arfel, L'Attente du soir (José Corti)
- 2011 – Pierre Cendors, Engeland (Finitude)
- 2012 – Yamen Manai, La Sérénade d'Ibrahim Santos (Elyzad)
- 2013 - Gaëlle Josse, Nos vies désaccordées (Éditions Autrement)
- 2014 - Gaël Brunet, La Battue (Rouergue)
- 2015 – Marie-Aimée Lebreton, Cent-sept ans (Buchet/Chastel)
- 2016 – Cécile Huguenin, La Saison des mangues (Heloïse d'Ormesson)
- 2017 – Guy Boley, Fils de feu (Grasset)
- 2018 – Jean-Baptiste Andrea, Ma Reine (L'Iconoclaste)
- 2019 – Bruno Pellegrino, Là-bas, août est un mois d’automne (éditions Zoé)
- 2020 : Mélissa Da Costa, Tout le bleu du ciel (Carnets Nord)
- 2021 : Adrien Borne, Mémoire de soie (JC Lattès)
- 2022 : Annie Lulu, La Mer Noire dans les Grands Lacs (éditions Juilliard)
- 2023 : Mathieu Pieyre, Le Professeur d'anglais (éditions Arléa)
- 2024 : Paul Saint-Bris L’allègement des vernis

== See also ==
- List of French literary awards
