= Tony Soulié =

French artist

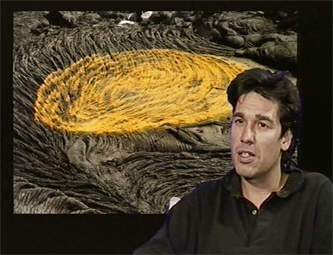
- Born: 1955 (age 70–71); Paris, France
- Education: École des Arts Appliqués, Paris

Tony Soulié (born 1955) is a French artist working in painting, printmaking, sculpture, installation art and photography.

== Biography ==
Soulié was part of the “Nouvelle Abstraction” (Neo Post Pictorialism) French movement in the 1970-1980s. Hundreds of exhibitions of his works have been organized throughout the world and his works are featured in many public and private collections from the Museum of Modern Art, Paris, Utsunomiya Museum of Art and Hawaii State Foundation on Culture and the Arts through the Peter Stuyvesant Foundation and the Spiegel foundation.

His work has been exhibited at the Museo Nacional de Bellas Artes in Chili, Musée des Tapisseries in Aix-en-Provence, the Honolulu Museum of Art Spalding House (formerly known as The Contemporary Museum, Honolulu), Museum of Avallon, Kulturhuset Art-Center in Stockholm, Clayarch Gimhae Museum in South Korea, The Industry Museum in Charleroi, Museum of Modern Art, Rio de Janeiro, Museum for Fine Arts in Brasília, Colombian National Museum in Bogotá, Museum of Contemporary Art, Zagreb in Croatia, Royal Post Museum in Bangkok. His art is in the collections of many of these museums as well as private foundations and he is represented by art dealers and art galleries in London, Paris, Frankfurt, Copenhagen, Seoul, Tokyo, Santa Fe, New Mexico and other cities around the world.

== Background ==
Soulié was raised in Paris, France where he was born. He earned his degrees at the École des Arts Appliqués. Although he is generally referred to as a painter, he has also created numerous Artist's books, sculptures and Prints as well as installations and performances.

Soulié did on-stage performances in a series of theatrical productions between 1982 and 1991. He later signed scenography for a number of productions. He did many installations of land art, especially on volcanoes – even in some cases inside the calderas of active volcanoes.

== Techniques and processes ==
The materials Soulié uses in his paintings are very constant, varnish, carborundum powder mixed with acrylic painting are his trademark since 1992 with his first series of painted photographs from Africa. These materials are specific products not originally intended for fine arts that he adopted from his immediate surroundings when his studio was located in Paris Bastille neighborhood, at this time dominated by craftsman activities assembling furniture.

The use of carborundum in his paintings links back to the volcano installations: the silicon component of the artificial compound is in nature, as pure crystals, only found in volcanic exhalations.

The technique of painted photographs, or “photo-paintings” as he labels them, are based on large scale black and white photographs taken during his travels across the world that he covers with ink, acrylic, varnish and carborundum. The themes that are explored in these painted photographs include the megalopolis based on his own photography from the biggest cities around the world but also flowers and dream catchers. Soulié has created a great number of Artist's books and collective portfolios with poets and other artists including Michel Butor, Patricia Erbelding, Serge Gavronsky, Patrick Grainville, Alain Jouffroy, Michel Luneau, J. M. G. Le Clézio, Tita Reut and Salah Stétié.

== Career ==
=== Early career ===
Although coming from a family with its roots in the region of Albi in southern France, Soulié grew up in Paris in the Bastille / Marais neighborhood, then dominated by the furniture handcraft industry. His first personal gallery show opened at the Gallery Durgnat, Switzerland in 1977 and he was featured in the 1984 show at the Grand Palais: "peintures, l’autre nouvelle generation" that was the showcase that launched a new generation of French Artists. The Grand Palais show was immediately followed by a growing series of regular exhibitions. He became a featured artist at the Françoise Palluel Gallery that showed his works starting with the 1985 Foire internationale d'art contemporain (FIAC) Art Fair through the mid-nineties where in 1996, the Soulié exhibition launched the Dhalgren Gallery.

He was awarded the grant “Villa-Medicis hors les murs” by the French Academy in Rome in 1987. This allowed him to establish himself in Naples where he started working on installations doing land-art on the volcanoes starting with the neighboring Vesuvius. 1990 saw him designing the spinnaker carried by a famously branded boat in the Whitbread Round the World Race (now the Volvo Ocean Race) which narrowly escaped sinking as a result of being bumped by a whale in the Tasman Sea.

In 1992 he was one of the artists representing France at the Universal Exposition of Seville Expo '92 in Spain.

He continued meanwhile the land-art installations on volcanoes in 1997 with Big Island and Mauï in the Hawaï archipelago. The work was part of a photographic exhibition the same year in The Contemporary Museum, Honolulu. He also started working with the Galerie Protée that have remained one of his main representations in Paris.

In 1996 he started travelling the African costs and he brought back photopaintings from Zanzibar, Benin and other countries. The themes developed in his works in Africa were subject to a parallel work done in Murano Island of Venice, Italy, the glass-pearl produce of which played such a key role in the slave-trade off the African cost (the scars of which can still be felt both historically and politically today both in Africa and the new world). During 1998 and 1999 he worked with Simone Cenedese, maestro vetraio of Murano on realizing a series of glass-sculptures based on African fetish sculptures. The project was to counter the logic from the slave-trade where captives are bought and paid for in glass-pearls cast in Murano. He had his first personal show in Japan in 1998 at the MMG Gallery.

=== Later Years (2000-) ===
After many books and catalogues, the first monograph on Tony Soulié was published in 1999 and has been followed by regular publications up to the 2009 publication that documented the years 1976 – 2008 in 557 pages. Possibly as a resurgence of his Albi origins, Soulié has investigated the tauromachia or magic of bullfighting. This investigation was first presented as the Faena series of work in 2000.

In a 2001 edition entitled "Lagos La Tropicale", Soulié's photopaintings realized in Nigeria were accompanied by a text by Dominique Sigaud. The whole forming a portrait of the Megalopolis of Lagos. This work, like the one he did in Havana, proved too controversial for local authorities that cancelled the planned showings. Other similar works realized in Bénin and São Tomé have been shown in several exhibitions.

The Museum Convent of the Cordeliers in Châteauroux shows a first major retrospective exhibition of his works in 2003 and he is awarded Chevalier de l’Ordre des Arts et des Lettres by the French Ministry of Culture in 2004.

The Palais Synodal in Sens shows a major exhibition in 2007 entitled Panorama – seeking to provide a full review of Soulié's body of work.

2010 sees Soulié return to the medium of glass-sculptures. After a series interpreting the sculptural language of the Zuni, a new work on the shamanistic relationship to the animus is explored in the ensemble 2011 showing at the Domaine Dalmeran entitled ANIMA-ANIMISME.

Most recently, the town and region of La Rochelle have invited Soulié to exhibit in numerous sites across the town during the summer of 2012.
