= Roger Laporte =

French writer (1925–2001)

Roger Laporte (20 July 1925, Lyon – 24 April 2001, Montpellier) was a 20th-century French writer.

== Works ==
- 1963: La Veille, Éditions Gallimard, series "Le Chemin"
- 1966: Une voix de fin silence, Gallimard, series "Le Chemin"
- 1967: Pourquoi ? (Une voix de fin silence II), Gallimard, series "Le Chemin"
- 1970: Fugue, biographie, Gallimard, series "Le Chemin"
- 1973: Fugue. Supplément, biographie, Gallimard, series "Le Chemin"
- 1973: Deux lectures de Maurice Blanchot (with Bernard Noël), Fata Morgana, series "Le Grand Pal", Montpellier
- 1974: Une migration et Le partenaire, Fata Morgana, 1974 (texts published in magazines in 1959 and 1960, lettre-préface by René Char)
- 1975: Quinze variations sur un thème biographique, Flammarion, series "Textes"
- 1976: Fugue 3, Flammarion
- 1979: Carnets (extraits), Hachette, series "POL"
- 1979: Souvenirs de Reims and other tales, Hachette, series "POL", Prix France Culture
- 1979: Suite, biographie, Hachette, series "POL"
- 1983: Moriendo, biographie, P.O.L
- 1986: Une vie, biographie, P.O.L
- 1986: Écrire la musique, A Passage
- 1986: Hölderlin une douleur éperdue. Seyssel (Ain) : Editions Comp'Act
- 1988: Entre deux mondes (with 17 photographs by François Lagarde), Gris banal
- 1989: Lettre à personne (with an avant-propos de Philippe Lacoue-Labarthe and a postface by Maurice Blanchot), Plon
- 1990: Quelques petits riens, Ulysse fin de siècle
- 1991: Études, P.O.L
- 1994: A l’extrême pointe : Proust, Bataille, Blanchot, Fata Morgana, Montpellier
- 1997: La Loi de l’alternance, Fourbis
- 2000: Variations sur des carnets, Éditions Cadex
- 2002: Le Carnet, Léo Scheer

== Studies ==
- 2006: Pour Roger Laporte, under the direction of François Dominique: texts by Marcel Cohen, Alain Coulange, Michel Deguy, Jacques Derrida, Jean Frémon, Liliane Giraudon, Frédéric-Yves Jeannet, Pierre Madaule, Bernard Noël, Michel Surya, Alain Veinstein, Jean-Jacques Viton, Editions Lignes
- 2010: Michel Surya, Excepté le possible : Jacques Dupin, Roger Laporte, Bernard Noël, Jean-Michel Reynard, fissile éditions
