= Grand prix Jean Giono =

French literary prize

- Native name: Prix Jean Giono
- Description: French literary prize established to honor the writer Jean Giono
- Country: France

The Grand prix Jean Giono (French: 'Prix Jean Giono') is a French literary prize. It was established in 1990 at the initiative of Michel Albert, to honour the writer Jean Giono. Since 1992 it consists of two categories: the Jean Giono Grand Prize (Grand prix Jean Giono) and the Jury Prize (Prix du Jury). The winner of the Grand prix Jean Giono receives 10,000 euros.

== Grand prix Jean Giono ==
Given to a French-language author who has "defended or illustrated the novel's case".

- 1990: Yves Beauchemin for Juliette Pomerleau (de Fallois)
- 1991: Michel Calonne for Les Enfances (Éditions Viviane Hamy)
- 1992: François Nourissier for Gardien des ruines (Éditions Grasset)
- 1993: Félicien Marceau for La Terrasse de Lucrezia (Éditions Gallimard)
- 1994: Jacques Laurent for L'Inconnu du temps qui passe (Grasset)
- 1995: Vladimir Volkoff for Le Grand Tsar blanc (de Fallois)
- 1996: Michel Déon for The Great and the Good (La Cour des grands) (Gallimard)
- 1997: J. M. G. Le Clézio for Poisson d'or (Gallimard)
- 1998: Sylvie Germain for Tobie des marais (Gallimard)
- 1999: Jean d'Ormesson for Le Rapport Gabriel (Gallimard)
- 2000: Ahmadou Kourouma for Allah n'est pas obligé (éditions du Seuil)
- 2001: Jean Raspail for Adíos, tierra delfuego (Albin Michel)
- 2002: Serge Rezvani for L'Amour en face (Actes Sud)
- 2003: Robert Merle for Le Glaive et les Amours (de Fallois)
- 2004: Pierre Moinot for Coup d'État (Gallimard)
- 2005: Danièle Sallenave for La Fraga (Gallimard)
- 2006: Pascal Quignard for Villa Amalia, Gallimard
- 2007: Jacques Chessex for Le Vampire de Ropraz ,(Grasset
- 2008: Amélie Nothomb for The Prince's Act (Le Fait du prince) (Albin Michel)
- 2009: Dominique Fernandez for Ramon (Grasset
- 2010: Charles Dantzig for Pourquoi lire ?, Grasset
- 2011: Metin Arditi for Le Turquetto, Actes Sud
- 2012: François Garde for Ce qu'il advint du sauvage blanc, Gallimard
- 2013: Pierre Jourde for La Première Pierre, Gallimard
- 2014: Fouad Laroui for Les Tribulations du dernier Sijilmassi (éditions Julliard)
- 2015: Charif Majdalani for Villa des femmes, Seuil
- 2016: Alain Blottière for Comment Baptiste est mort, Gallimard
- 2017: Jean-René Van der Plaetsen for La Nostalgie de l'honneur Grasset
- 2018: Paul Greveillac for Maîtres et Esclaves Gallimard
- 2019: Jean-Luc Coatalem for La Part du fils Stock
- 2020: Franck Bouysse for Buveurs de vent Albin Michel
- 2021: Frédéric Verger for Sur les toits, Gallimard
- 2022: Sandrine Collette for On était des loups, Lattès
- 2023: Gaspard Koenig for Humus, l'Observatoire

== Jury Prize ==
Given for a French-language work of literature of any type, with focus on imagination and storytelling in the spirit of Jean Giono.

- 1992: François Bontempelli for L'Arbre du voyageur
- 1993: Marc Bressant for L'Anniversaire (de Fallois)
- 1994: Georges-Olivier Châteaureynaud for Le Château de verre (Julliard)
- 1995: Amélie Nothomb for The Stranger Next Door (Les Catilinaires) (Albin Michel)
- 1996: Laurence Cossé for Le Coin du voile (Gallimard)
- 1997: Jean-Pierre Milovanoff for Le Maître des paons (Julliard)
- 1998: Dominique Muller for Les Caresses et les Baisers (Seuil)
- 1999: Michèle Desbordes for La Demande (éditions Verdier)
- 2000: Daniel Arsand for En silence (Phébus)
- 2001: Isabelle Hausser for La Table des enfants (de Fallois)
- 2002: Stéphane Héaume for Le Clos Lothar (Zulma)
- 2003: Yasmina Reza for Adam Haberberg (Albin Michel)
- 2004: Laurent Gaudé for The Scortas' Sun (Le Soleil des Scorta) (Actes Sud)
- 2005: Armel Job for Les Fausses Innocences (Robert Laffont)
- 2006: François Vallejo for Ouest (Viviane Hamy)
- 2007: David Foenkinos for Qui se souvient de David Foenkinos ? (Gallimard)
- 2008: Jean-Marie Blas de Roblès for Là où les tigres sont chez eux (Zulma)
- 2009: Brigitte Giraud for Une année étrangère (Stock)
- 2010: Jean-Baptiste Harang for Nos cœurs vaillants (éditions Grasset)
