= Michel Surya =

French writer, philosopher and publisher (born 1954)

Michel Surya (born 1954) is a French writer, philosopher and publisher. A specialist of Georges Bataille, he is the founder and director of the journal Lignes and the Éditions Lignes.

== Publications ==
=== Tales ===
- 1988: Exit, preface by Bernard Noël, Séguier, reprint followed by Les Noyés Éditions Farrago/Éditions Léo Scheer, 2001.
- 1990: Les Noyés, Séguier; reprint Éditions Farrago/Éditions Léo Scheer preceded by Exit, 2001.
- 1995: Défiguration, Fourbis
- 1996: Olivet, Fourbis
- 2006: L'Éternel Retour : roman, Éditions Lignes
- 2010: L'Impasse, Éditions Al Dante
- 2016: Le Mort-Né, Al Dante

=== Essais ===
- 1987: Georges Bataille : la mort à l’œuvre, éditions Séguier; nouvelle éd. augmentée et mise à jour, Éditions Gallimard, 1992; reprint Gallimard, series « Tel », 2012
- 1999: De la domination : le capital, la transparence et les affaires, Farrago
- 1999: L’Imprécation littéraire : Antelme, Artaud, Bataille, Chestov, Debord, Klossowski, Rushdie, Sade, in Matériologies, I, Farrago
- 1999: De l’argent : la ruine de la politique, in De la domination II, Éditions Payot.
- 2000: Portrait de l’intellectuel en animal de compagnie, De la domination, III, Farrago
- 2000: Mots et mondes de Pierre Guyotat, in Matériologies, II, Farrago, 2000.
- 2001: Humanimalité, éditions du Néant
- 2004: La Révolution rêvée, Fayard
- 2004: Humanimalités, précédé de L'idiotie de Bataille, in Matériologies, III, Léo Scheer
- 2007: Portrait de l'intermittent du spectacle en supplétif de la domination, in De la domination, IV, Éditions Lignes
- 2010: Excepté le possible : Jacques Dupin, Roger Laporte, Bernard Noël, Jean-Michel Reynard, Fissile & co
- 2011: Le Polième (Bernard Noël) , in Matériologies, IV, Nouvelles éditions Lignes
- 2012: Sainteté de Bataille, Éditions de l'Éclat
- 2013: Les Singes de leur idéal. Sur l'usage récent du mot "changement", De la domination, V, Nouvelles éditions Lignes
- 2015: L'Autre Blanchot. L'écriture de jour, l'écriture de nuit, Gallimard
- 2016: Capitalisme et djihadisme. Une guerre de religion, Nouvelles éditions Lignes

=== Editions and prefaces ===
- Emily Brontë, Les Hauts de Hurlevent, illustré de 15 dessins à la plume de Balthus, Paris, Séguier, 1990.
- Véronique Bergen, Jean Genet, entre mythe et réalité, De Boeck université, 1993.
- D.A.F. de Sade, Français encore un effort si vous voulez être républicains, Paris, Fourbis, 1996
- Georges Bataille, Choix de lettres (1917-1962), Paris, Gallimard, coll. « Les Cahiers de la NRF », 1997.
- Georges Bataille, Une Liberté souveraine. Textes et entretiens, Paris, Farrago, 2000 (édité partiellement dans le catalogue de l’exposition du centième anniversaire de la naissance de Georges Bataille à la médiathèque d'Orléans, Paris, Fourbis, 1997)
- Bernard Noël, Les Premiers mots, Paris, Flammarion/Léo Scheer, 2003
- Paule Thévenin, Antonin Artaud : fin de l’ère chrétienne, Paris, Lignes/Léo Scheer, 2006
- Christine Lavant, Das Kind, Paris, Lignes/Léo Scheer, 2006.
- Georges Bataille, Charlotte d’Ingerville, suivi de Sainte, Paris, Lignes/Léo Scheer, 2006.
- Georges Bataille, La Structure psychologique du fascisme, Paris, Nouvelles Éditions Lignes, 2009.
- Alain Hobé, Lieu commun, Fissile, 2009
- Alain Jugnon, L’Écriture matérielle, Paris, Le Limon, 2010.
- Georges Bataille, Discussion sur le péché, Paris, Nouvelles Éditions Lignes, 2010.
- Georges Bataille, La Notion de dépense, présentation de Francis Marmande, Paris, Nouvelles Éditions Lignes, 2011.
- Georges Bataille, L'Anus solaire suivi de Sacrifices, Paris, Nouvelles Éditions Lignes, 2011.
- Georges Bataille, La Souveraineté, Paris, Nouvelles Éditions Lignes, 2012.
- Georges Bataille, L'Alleluiah. Catéchisme de Dianus, Paris, Nouvelles Éditions Lignes, 2012.
- Georges Bataille et André Breton, « Contre-Attaque ». Union de lutte des intellectuels révolutionnaires : « Les Cahiers » et les autres documents, octobre 1935-mai 1936, Paris, Ypsilon Éditeur, coll. « Contre-attaque », 2013.
- Jean-Noël Vuarnet, El filosofo-artista, Editions incorpore, 2015. (Spain)
- Amandine André, De la destruction, Al Dante, 2016.
- Georges Bataille, A Experiência interior, Autêntica, 2017. (Brazil)
- Dionys Mascolo, Le Communisme, Paris, Lignes, 2018.
- Georges Bataille, Das Blau des Himmels, Matthes & Seitz, 2018. (Germany)
- Alain Jugnon, L’Ivre Nietzsche, Toulon, La Nerthe, 2019.
- Sylvain Santi, Cerner le réel. Christian Prigent à l’œuvre, Presses universitaires de Lyon, 2019.
- Georges Bataille, Der Fluch des Ökonomie, Matthes & Seitz, 2019. (Germany)
- Georges Bataille, Die Erotik, Matthes & Seitz, 2020. (Germany)
