= Soazig Aaron =

French author (born 1949)

Soazig Aaron (born 1949, Rennes) is a French author.

== Biography ==
After studying history, Soazig Aaron worked for a few years in a bookshop in Paris. Today, she lives in Rennes in Brittany.

Her first novel, Le Non de Klara, appeared in 2002. The author, who is not Jewish, recounts in a fictitious diary the fate of Klara, a survivor of Auschwitz who returned in 1945 to Paris, trying to resume a normal life.

For this work, Soazig Aaron received the prix Goncourt du premier roman and the prix Emmanuel Roblès of the city of Blois in 2002. These two prizes reward a first novel. In 2002, it also obtained the Prix du Roman of the city of Carhaix. In 2004, Le Non de Klara was crowned with the Grand Prix des Libraires. In Germany, the novel was awarded the Geschwister-Scholl-Preis.

Her second novel, La Sentinelle tranquille sous la lune, was published by éditions Gallimard in 2010.

== Works ==
- 2002: Le Non de Klara, éditions Maurice Nadeau, ISBN 2-86231-172-3
- 2010: La Sentinelle tranquille sous la lune, Gallimard
