= Charif Majdalani =

French-Lebanese writer (born 1960)

Charif Madalani
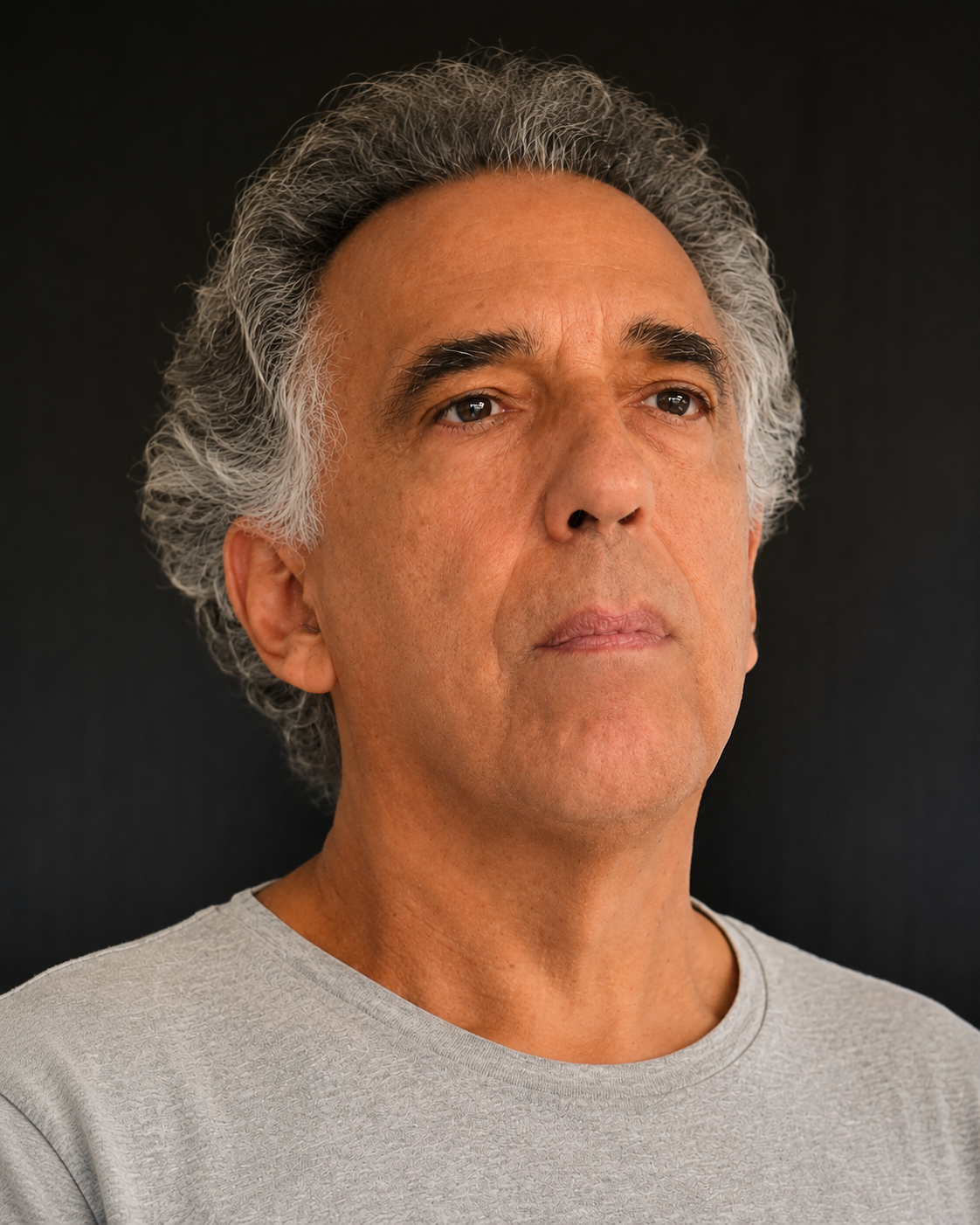
- Private photography
- Born: 1960 (age 65–66); Beirut, Lebanon
- Occupation: Novelist

Charif Majdalani (born 1960) is a French-Lebanese writer.

== Early life and education ==
Charif Majdalani was born in Beirut in 1960.

== Career ==
Majdalani is a novelist and professor at Saint Joseph University, where he was head of the Department of French Literature from 1999 to 2008.

Between 2005 and 2017, he published six novels in French. According to Suzanne Joinson, writing in The New York Times, "Majdalani's novels are much praised in the Francophone world, and with good reason. His seductive prose twists and turns, deftly matching hallucinatory content with form." and have been translated into several languages.

== Other activities ==
Majdalaini has been a member of the editorial board of L'Orient littéraire and president of the International Writers' House in Beirut.

== Recognition and awards ==
He has won the Phénix Prize (2005), the Tropiques Prize (2008), the François Mauriac Prize of the Académie française (2008), the Jean Giono Prize (2015), the France-Liban prize (2016) and the Moise Khayrallah Prize of the North Carolina State University (2017).

== Bibliography ==
- Histoire de la grande maison, Seuil, 2005 (Prix Phénix)
  - A History of the big House, Other Press 2024
  - Das Haus in den Orangengärten, Knaus Verlag 2007
  - La Casa nel giardino degli aranci, Giunti 2010
  - البيت الكبير ، Dar AnNahar, 2008
  - Το Μεγάλο Σπίτι, Castaniotis, 2015
- Caravansérail, Seuil, 2007 (Prix Tropiques, Prix François Mauriac de l'Académie française)
  - Ein Palast Auf Reisen, Knaus Verlag, 2009.
  - Moving the Palace, New Vessel Press, 2017 (Moise Khayrallah Prize)
- Nos si brèves années de gloire, Seuil, 2012
- Le Dernier Seigneur de Marsad, Seuil, 2013
  - سيّد المرصد الأخير, Hachette-Antoine, 2069
- Villa des Femmes, Seuil, 2015 (Grand Prix Jean Giono, Prix France-Liban)
  - فيلاّ النساء, Hachette Antoine, 2018
  - La Villa delle donne, Astarte Edizioni 2021
- L'Empereur à Pied, Seuil, 2017
- Des vies possibles, Seuil 2019
  - Vite possibili, Nuova Éditrice Berti, 2023
  - حَيَواتٌ مُمكِنَة, Dar Madarek, 2023
- Beyrouth 2020: Journal d'un effondrement, Actes Sud, 2020 (Prix Femina Special Jury Prize)
  - Beirut 2020: The Collapse of a Civilization, a Journal, Mountain Leopard Press, 2021
  - Beirut 2020, Diary of the collapse, Other Press, 2021
- Dernière oasis, Actes Sud, 2021
