= François Dominique (writer) =

French writer and translator (born 1943)

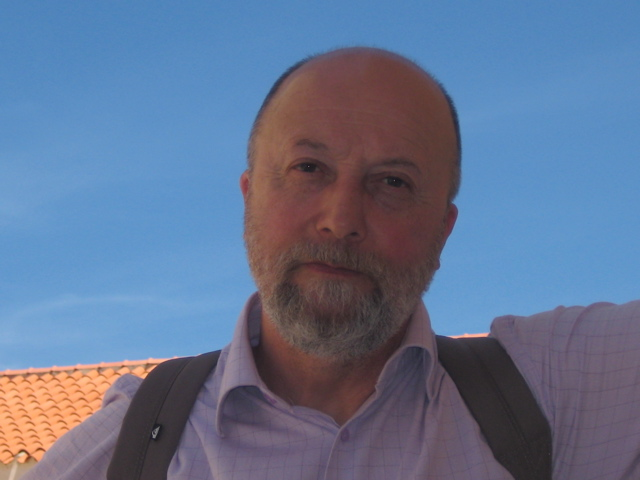
François Dominique

François Dominique (born in Paris, on 21 July 1943) is a French writer and translator.

He taught law and political science at the University of Burgundy. Under the name Dominique Gros, he published Le droit antisémite de Vichy, La pauvreté saisie par le droit, Le droit de résistance à l’oppression in Le Genre Humain, Seuil Publisher.

In 1987, together with Jean-Michel Rabate, he founded the publishing house Ulysses-Fin-de-Siècle which became Virgile Publisher in 2002.

With Serge Gavronsky he translated Louis Zukofsky’s « A » into French, of which five volumes, including 23 sections of this long poem, have been published by Virgile, 1994 - 2015.

Some articles of François Dominique appeared in the journal Law and Literature.

== Publications ==
=== Novels and short stories ===
- Aséroé, récit, POL, 1992. ASEROË, novel, translation by Howard Limoli and Richard Sieburth, Bellevue Literary Press, New York, 2020.
- Une phrase, monologue, Actuaria, 1995.
- La Musique des morts, roman, Mercure de France : Bourse Stendhal, 1996.
- Parole donnée, roman, Mercure de France, 1999 (Prix Bourgogne de littérature).
- Romulphe, roman, Mercure de France, 2008.
- Solène, roman, Verdier, 2011 (Mention spéciale du jury, Prix Wepler-Fondation La Poste 2011, Prix Littéraire Charles Brisset 2012), translated by Samuel Martin, Otis Books, Seismicity Editions, Los Angeles, 2017.
- À Présent, Louis-René des Forêts, récit, Mercure de France, 2013, ISBN 978-2-7152-3408-6
- Atout cœur, récit, avec John Batho (photographe), Éditions Virgile, 2013, ISBN 978-2-9144-8195-3
- Délicates sorcières, roman, ((Champ Vallon)), 2017.

=== Literary essays ===
- Vernichtung, in Paroles à la bouche du présent. Le Négationnisme, histoire ou politique ?, essai, Éditions Al Dante, 1997.
- Kyrielle de beaux gestes, in La Lecture de A à Z, Doras, 2000.
- Le Paradis parlé, in Valère Novarina, théâtres du verbe, essai, José Corti, 2001.
- KARIN. Dans la cendre des mots, avec Anne Cayre, récit, Collection Ulysse Fin de siècle, Éditions Virgile, 2001.
- Maurice Blanchot premier temoin, essai, Éditions Virgile, 2003.
- Pour Roger Laporte, (collectif), éditions Lignes-Léo Scheer.
- Ulysse fin de siècle, Vers et Proses, (avec Jean-Michel Rabaté et Daniel Legrand), anthologie 1987–2003, Éditions Virgile, 2005.
- L'Homme Approximatif, (avec Bruno Lemoine & alii...), anthologie poétique, avec un DVD d'Isabelle Filleul de Brohy, Éditions Al Dante, 2014.

=== Poetry ===
- A Wonderful Day, poetry, photographs by Bernard Plossu, Le Temps qu'il fait, 2003.
- Humanités, poems, drawings by Alfieri Gardone, Obsidiane, 2006.
- Petite Cassandre, poems, photographs by Bernard Plossu, éditions du Murmure, 2011.
- Le Paradis de Monsieur Truc, narration, with Catherine Gardone (photographer), Les Philadelphes, 2013, ISBN 978-2-7466-5791-5

=== Translations ===
- Le regard de l’effraie by Christophe Meckel, with A. Jadot, Collection Ulysse Fin de siècle, Éditions Virgile, 1993.
- Syndrom Deutschland de Eberhard Häfner, with C. Gros, Collection Ulysse Fin de siècle, Éditions Virgile, 1994 et 1998.
- A, sections 1 à 7, 8 à 11, 12, 13 à 18, by Louis Zukofsky, with Serge Gavronsky, Éditions Virgile, 1998 à 2012.
- Les Sonnets à Orphée by Rainer Maria Rilke, Éditions Virgile, 2001.
- Corneilles et autres volatiles by Dezső Tandori, translated by François Dominique and Andràs Gyöngyösi, Collection Ulysse Fin de siècle, Éditions Virgile.

=== Literary journals ===
- Cahiers Le Temps qu’il fait, La Nouvelle Barre du Jour, Digraphe, Quai Voltaire, Lignes, IF, L’Infini, Revue des Sciences Humaines, CYCLOS, Law and Literature, Po&sie, Cahiers du Cinéma, Contre toute attente, Nulle Part, Europe, Nu(e)s, Modernités.

=== Artist’s books ===
- Collection Mémoires d'Eric Coisel, avec Ricardo Mosner, Jean Anguera, Joël Leick, Magali Latil, Karin Neumann, Anne Slacik, Georges Badin, Michaële-Andrea Schatt.
- Collection L'attentive d'Eliane Kircher, avec Magali Latil.

=== Playwright ===
- L'Oiseau recommencé, pièce en trois tableaux, créée par Marcel Bozonnet (stage d’Éducation Populaire, Nevers, août 1966). Décors et mise en espace : Marijo Gros. Revue du Festival de Nancy, N°9, Janvier-Mars 1967.

== Notes and references ==
=== External links ===
- François Dominique sur le site des éditions Verdier
