= Jean Lods =

French writer (born 1938)

Jean Lods (born 5 April 1938, in Montbéliard) is a French writer. He spent his childhood on the island of Réunion which later became the setting of a number of his novels. He won the Prix Alain-Fournier for his novel Le Bleu des vitraux and he was also nominated several times for the Prix Renaudot.
