= Jean-Pierre Ohl =

French writer (born 1959)

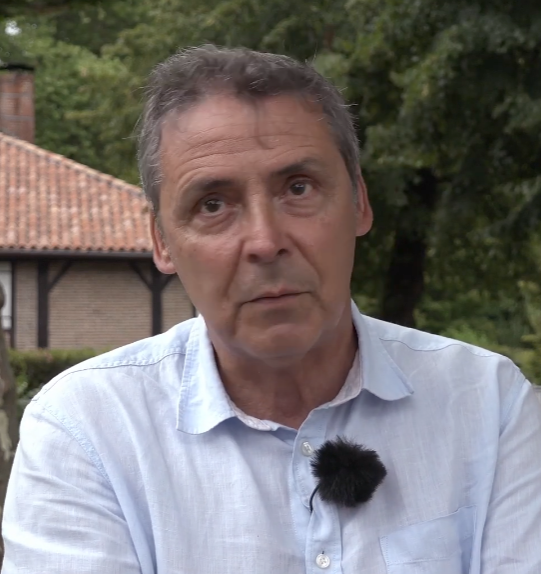
- In a 2024 interview
- Born: 1959 (age 66–67); Onesse-Laharie, France
- Occupation: Writer

Jean-Pierre Ohl (born 1959) is a French writer. He was born in Onesse-Laharie, a small village in the Landes forest in Southwest France. After studying literature he began working in independent bookstores. Thanks to his brother, the writer Michel Ohl, he discovered Charles Dickens who has had a great influence on his books and to whom he devoted a biography in 2011.

== Works ==
- 2004: Monsieur Dick ou Le Dixième Livre, Paris, Éditions Gallimard, 280 p. ISBN 2-07-077099-0.

- Prix Emmanuel Roblès 2005

- 2008: Les Maîtres de Glenmarkie, Gallimard, 360 p. ISBN 978-2-07-012147-2.
- 2011: Charles Dickens, Gallimard, series « Folio. Biographies », 305 p. ISBN 978-2-07-043905-8.
- 2012: Redrum, Talence, France, Éditions de l’Arbre vengeur, 242 p. ISBN 978-2-916141-90-9.
