= Richard Jorif =

French writer

- Born: 1930
- Died: 2010 (aged 79–80)
- Occupation: Writer
- Language: French
- Genre: Short stories
- Years active: 1987–2001 (published works)

Richard Jorif (1930–2010) was a French writer. He was born to an Indian father and a mother from Martinique. He published his first novel at the age of 57. The book titled Le Navire Argo won the Alain Fournier Prize. Other books include “Clownerie” (François Bourin, 1988), “Paul Valéry” (Lattès, 1991), and “Tohu-bohu” (Julliard, 2000). His last book in 2001 was a collection of short stories.

== Works ==
- 1987 : Le Navire Argo, roman (triptyque Frédéric Mops), éditions François Bourin
- 1988 : Clownerie, éditions François Bourin
- 1991 : Paul Valéry, éditions Lattès, 1991
- 1991 : Le Burelain (triptyque Frédéric Mops), éditions Gallimard
- 1992 : Les Persistants lilas
- 2000 : Tohu-Bohu, roman (triptyque Frédéric Mops), éditions Julliard
- 2001 : Qu'est-ce que la mort, Fourrure?, nouvelles, éditions le Cherche Midi
