= Jean-Marie Blas de Roblès =

French writer

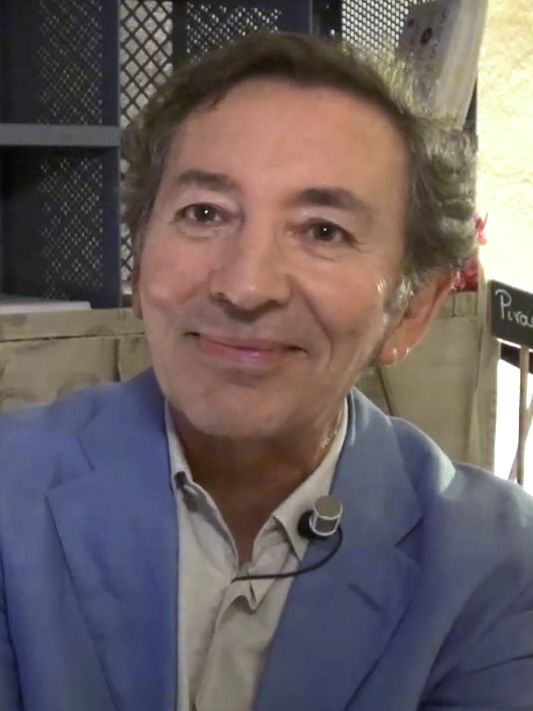
de Roblès in 2014

Jean-Marie Blas de Roblès is a French writer. He was born in Sidi bel Abbes in Algeria. He has lived and worked in Brazil, Taiwan and Libya. He is best known for his novel Where Tigers Are at Home which won the Prix du roman Fnac, the Grand prix Jean Giono, and the Prix Médicis. It has been translated into English by Mike Mitchell.
