= Adiós, Tierra del Fuego =

2001 book by Jean Raspail

- First edition
- Author: Jean Raspail
- Language: French
- Publisher: Éditions Albin Michel
- Publication date: 2001
- Publication place: France
- Pages: 400
- ISBN: 9782226121547

Adiós, Tierra del Fuego is a 2001 book by the French writer Jean Raspail. It focuses on Tierra del Fuego, an archipelago off the southern tip of South America, in both a historical and personal perspective. The area had been the subject of several previous works by Raspail, in particular related to the subject of Orélie-Antoine de Tounens, the self-proclaimed king of Araucanía and Patagonia, who also is featured prominently in Adiós, Tierra del Fuego. The book received the Jean Giono Prize.

== Reception ==
Philippe Brassart of La Dépêche du Midi wrote: "Adios Tierra del Fuego is neither a novel, nor an essay, further not a banal travelogue, it is a tribute." Brassart described the book's language as "rich and pure".
