= Christian Le Guillochet =

French actor, playwright and theatre director (1933-2011)

Christian Le Guillochet (20 September 1933 in Albi – 10 February 2011 in Paris) was a French actor, playwright and theatre director.

With his wife Luce Berthommé, he created the cultural center Lucernaire in Paris.

== Biography ==
Born in Albi in 1933 from a railway father and a nursing mother, he was a worker when he was summoned to fight in Algeria. Back in France, he attended evening classes and obtained a degree in technical and commercial engineering. He took drama classes to cure his shyness. In 1963, Robert Dhéry noticed and engaged him in Grosse Valse. He learned much by observing the star of the show, Louis de Funès.

In 1964, he founded a first café-théâtre, then "Le Lucernaire" in 1968, near the Montparnasse métro station, rue d'Odessa. Ten years later, expelled because of the construction of the Montparnasse Tower, he installed "Le Lucernaire" at 53 rue Notre-Dame des Champs.

In the 1970s, he began a long-term friendship with Laurent Terzieff to whom he entrusted the artistic direction of the Lucernaire for five years.

On 5 November 2003, on the evening of the premiere of Subvention, a play by Jean-Luc Jeener in which he embodied a theater director, he started a hunger strike so that the city of Paris and the Ministry of Culture did not cut subsidies to the "Lucernaire". In 2004, his wife died, and, at age 70, he sold the "Lucernaire" to the group owner of the publishing house L'Harmattan.

== Filmography ==
- 1964: Heaven on One's Head, by Yves Ciampi
- 1966: Le Solitaire passe à l'attaque, by Ralph Habib
- 1968: Le Débutant, by Daniel Daert
- 1969: Ciné-Girl, by Francis Leroi - Michaël
- 1971: La Part des lions, by Jean Larriaga
- 1976: Monsieur Sade, by Jacques Robin

== Television ==
- 1966: Illusions perdues, by Maurice Cazeneuve - Horace Bienchon
- 1967: The Flashing Blade, by Yannick Andréi - episodes 6 to 9 and 12 - Robiro
- 1968: Le Tribunal de l'Impossible : Nostradamus prophète en son pays, by Pierre Badel
- 1969: Que ferait donc Faber ? byt Dolorès Grassian
- 1970: Quentin Durward, by Gilles Grangier - Le Glorieux
- 1972: Vassa Geleznova, by Pierre Badel - Piaterkine
- 1980: Façades, by Jacques Robin - Angelo Sordi
- 1981: Mon meilleur Noël - episode : L'Oiseau bleu, by Gabriel Axel - Le Peuplier

== Books ==
- 1995: L'oiseau éventail, ISBN 9782905262912, Prix Emmanuel Roblès 1996
- 2006: 50 ans de Théâtre, depuis l'impasse Odessa jusqu'à la rue Notre-Dame des Champs, Éditions L'Harmattan
- 2008: Le Chien citoyen, L'Harmattan
