= Cécile Huguenin =

French psychologist and life coach

Cécile Huguenin is a French psychologist and life coach. She made her literary debut in 2011 with an acclaimed memoir titled Alzheimer mon amour. At the age of seventy-four, she published her debut novel La Saison des mangues. It won the Prix Alain Fournier. Her second novel Passages du désir appeared in 2017.
