= Stéphane Héaume =

French novelist (born 1971)

Stéphane Héaume (born 27 March 1971 in Paris) is a French novelist. He also writes texts for composers of classical music. After several years spent in Cameroun and New York, he now lives in Paris.

== Novels ==
- Le Clos Lothar, Paris, Zulma, 2002 (Jury Prize of the Grand Prix Jean-Giono 2002 and Prix Emmanuel Roblès 2003) ISBN 978-2-7578-1177-1, and Seuil, series "Points", 2009.
- Orkhidos, Paris, Zulma, 2004 ISBN 2-8430-4298-4
- Le Fou de Printzberg, Paris, Éditions Anne Carrière, 2006 ISBN 978-2-7578-0515-2 and Seuil, series "Points", 2007
- Le Contemplateur, Paris, Éditions Anne Carrière, 2007 ISBN 978-2-84337-456-2
- La Nuit de Fort-Haggar, Paris, Seuil, 2009 ISBN 978-2-02-097538-4
- Sheridan Square, Paris, Seuil, 2012 (Prix de la Ville de Deauville 2012) ISBN 978-2-02-105268-8
- L'Insolite évasion de Sebastian Wimer, Serge Safran, 2016 ISBN 979-10-90175-53-2

== Short stories ==
- L'Atlantide retrouvée in L'Atelier du roman (n°25), La Table Ronde, 2001 – Lueurs froides in Immédiatement (n°23), 2003 – Houldine in Houlgate, Aude et ses livres, 2003 – Le Livre de moire in Musique intime, Imprimerie Laffont, 2003 – Le Naturaliste in Décapage (n°34), La Table Ronde, 2008 – Par ordre du roi in Décapage (n°35), La Table Ronde, 2008 – Au Venusberg in Décapage (n°37), La Table Ronde, 2009 – La Flèche dans la Jungle in 100 Monuments, 100 Ecrivains, Editions du Patrimoine, 2010 – La Reine Alix in Les Cahiers Pierre Benoit, 2012 – Chemise blanche et bretelles noires in Couleurs Jazz (n°2), 2013 – Carlotta Palace in Les Deux Crânes, 2016.
- L'Idole noire, Éditions du Moteur, 2011 ISBN 978-2-918602-13-2

== Essays ==
- Emma, series "Les Prénoms", Paris, Zulma, 2001 ISBN 2-84304-130-9
- Pierre Benoit, maître du roman d'aventures, Paris, Hermann, 2015 ISBN 978-2-705690-81-6

== Lyrics and musical theatre ==
- Triptyque, music by Richard Dubugnon, Royal Academy of London, London, 1999 and Radio France, Paris, 2008 – Editions Peters.
- Le Voyage écarlate, music by Richard Dubugnon, Péniche Opéra, Paris, 2002 and Aix-en-Provence, 2005
- Cantata oscura, music by Richard Dubugnon, Espace Cardin, Paris, 2005 – Editions Peters.
- Valse désarticulée, music by Thierry Escaich, Théâtre du Lierre, Paris, 2007
- Le Songe Salinas for mezzo-soprano and orchestra, music by Richard Dubugnon, created 14 May 2009 at Théâtre des Champs-Élysées in Paris by the Orchestre national de France, directed by Fabien Gabel, with mezzo-soprano Nora Gubisch – Editions Peters.
- Les Miroirs de la Ville for soprano, mezzo-soprano, tenor, barytone and piano, music by Thierry Escaich, 20e Concours International de Chant, Festival Symphonies d'Automne, 20 to 24 November 2013 – Éditions Gérard Billaudot.
- Mamamouchi, comédie-ballet after Le Bourgeois gentilhomme by Molière, music by J.-B. Lully, created 8 August 2014 at Festival du Périgord Noir by the Académie de musique ancienne, directed by Michel Laplénie.
- La Reine, argument de ballet. Music by Joseph Haydn – Symphony. #85 en si bémol majeur, 2016.

== Discography ==
- Valse désarticulée, in Deux visages, Thierry Escaich. Caroline Meng, Jean-Pierre Baraglioli, Daphénéo, 2010.
- La Reine, Symphony # 85, Joseph Haydn. Rigel, Sarti, JC Bach. Julien Chauvin, Sandrine Piau, Concert de la Loge Olympique, Aparté / Harmonia Mundi, 23 September 2016.
- Le Songe Salinas, Triptyque, Arcanes symphoniques, Richard Dubugnon. Nora Gubisch, Thomas Dolié – Orchestre national de France. Dir. Fabien Gabel, Laurent Petitgirard, Debora Waldman. Naxos # 8.573687, Decembre 2016.
