= Dominique Sigaud =

French journalist, essayist and novelist (born 1959)

Dominique Sigaud (born 28 January 1959 in Paris) is a French journalist, essayist and novelist.

== Biography ==
From 1984 to 1996, as an independent journalist, she traveled the Arab world and Africa.

In 1996, she was awarded the Association des femmes journalistes prize for her article "Tutsis and Hutus: they are rebuilding together Rwanda in ruins", published in the magazine Cosmopolitan in November 1995. Since then she has devoted herself to writing.

== Works ==
- 1991: La Fracture algérienne. Calmann-Levy. 1991. p. 264. ISBN 978-2-7021-1950-1.
- 1996: L'Hypothèse du désert. Gallimard. 1996. p. 166. ISBN 978-2-07-074561-6. (Prix Gironde du premier roman 2007) prix Alain-Fournier 1997, prix Emmanuel Roblès 1997, prix Marguerite Yourcenar 1997. Translated as Somewhere in a Desert (1998) by Frank Wynne.
- 1997: La Vie, là-bas, comme le cours de l'oued. Gallimard. 1997. p. 136. ISBN 978-2-07-074942-3.
- 1998: Blue Moon. Gallimard, Collection Blanche. 1998. p. 144. ISBN 978-2-07-075360-4.
- 1999: La Part belle. Gallimard Jeunesse. 1999. p. 128. ISBN 978-2-07-052768-7.
- 2000: Les Innocents. Gallimard, Collection Blanche. 2000. p. 178. ISBN 978-2-07-075956-9.
- 2001: La Confusion du sourire. Inventaire/Invention, series "Textes". 2001. p. 21. ISBN 978-2-914412-14-8.
- 2002: Lagos, la tropicale. Garde-Temps. 2001. p. 108. ISBN 978-2-913545-10-6., Photos and paintings by Tony Soulié
- 2002: De chape et de plomb. Gallimard. 2003. p. 248. ISBN 978-2-07-076817-2.
- 2004: The Dark Side of the Moon. Actes Sud. 2004. p. 219. ISBN 978-2-7427-5137-2.
- 2005: Aimé. Actes Sud. 2005. p. 90. ISBN 978-2-7427-5879-1.
- 2006: L'Inconfort des ordures. Actes Sud. 2006. p. 180. ISBN 978-2-7427-6509-6.
- 2008: La Corpulence du monde. Seuil. 2008. p. 269. ISBN 978-2-02-096336-7.
- 2011: Conte d'exploitation. Actes Sud, series "Actes noirs". 2011. p. 213. ISBN 978-2-7427-9512-3.
- 2011: Franz Stangl et moi. Stock. 2011. p. 224. ISBN 978-2-234-07009-7.
- 2012: Le Piège des loups. Stock. 2012. p. 384. ISBN 978-2-234-07156-8.
- 2014: Partir, Calcutta. Éditions Verdier. 2014. p. 144. ISBN 978-2-86432-763-9.
- 2015: Tendres Rumeurs. Les Éditions du Sonneur. 2015. p. 75. ISBN 978-2916136905.
