= Marie-Aimée Lebreton =

French writer

Marie-Aimée Lebreton (born 1962 in Bouïra, Kabylie) is a French writer. She obtained a PhD in the philosophy of art and studied at the Conservatoire de Paris. She teaches at the University of Lorraine and lives in Paris.

Her first book was published in 2005 by Editions Pleins Feux. It was titled How Clémentine, Who is Deaf, Became a Musician, and had a preface by Sylviane Agacinski. Cent sept ans, her first novel, won the Prix Alain Fournier. Her 2020 novel Jacques et la corvée de bois deals with the absurdity of the Algerian war.
