= Jean-René Van der Plaetsen =

French journalist and writer (born 1962)

Jean-René Van der Plaetsen (born 9 August 1962) is a French journalist and writer. He is Deputy Managing Editor of Le Figaro Magazine. He has also been a member of the jury of the Prix de Flore since its creation in 1994.

== Life ==
Born in Lubumbashi, Republic of the Congo (former Belgian Congo), Van der Plaetsen studied at the Lycée Janson-de-Sailly (Paris), the Collège Saint-François-de-Sales (Évreux) then at the Collège Saint-Sulpice (Paris). He holds a law degree from the Paris Descartes University and is a former student of Sciences Po.

=== Le Figaro and Le Figaro Magazine ===
Van der Plaetsen joined Le Figaro in 1988, where he spent his entire career, including le Figaro littéraire, culture, and politics (of which he was head of department), then editor-in-chief. In January 2008, Alexis Brézet, then promoted to managing editor of Le Figaro Magazine, brought him to the magazine and appointed him deputy managing editor, a position he still holds today.

A friend of Michel Houellebecq, he conducted a series of very long interviews with him, entitled Un été avec Michel Houellebecq, which appeared in five episodes in Le Figaro Magazine during the summer of 2015. We see the author of Atomised confiding in complete freedom on the most diverse subjects - and interacting with philosopher Alain Finkielkraut and rock-star Iggy Pop.

== Work ==
- La Nostalgie de l'honneur, Paris, Éditions Grasset et Fasquelle, 2017, 240 p. ISBN 978-2-246-81393-4 – Grand Prix Jean Giono 2017; Prix Interallié 2017.

- Description of the heroic act of the Free French and the Compagnons de la Libération during the Second World War, as well as those of Indochina and Algéria through the itinerary of his maternal grandfather, the army general Jean Crépin, in whom the writer Bernard-Henri Lévy sees "one of the most luminous figures in the epic of Free France". "The strength of this book", writes the academician Jean-Marie Rouart, "is because it does not only evoke the author's grandfather, he speaks to us about us, about France, about a universe and a painful military sensitivity. Because, through a character, he reveals a tragedy to us. The officers' ordeal, in the fateful period 1940-1965, has rarely been illuminated in such a fair light." Franz-Olivier Giesbert, journalist and writer, also praised the book as follows: "Through the shocking account of the feats of his grandfather, hero of the Second World War and companion of General de Gaulle, Jean-René Van der Plaetsen pays tribute to this endangered value in a book that smells of heaven and clean air: The Nostalgia of Honour."
