= Daniel Arsand =

French writer (born 1950)

Daniel Arsand (born 9 July 1950 in Avignon) is a French writer as well as a publisher specializing in foreign literature.

== Biography ==
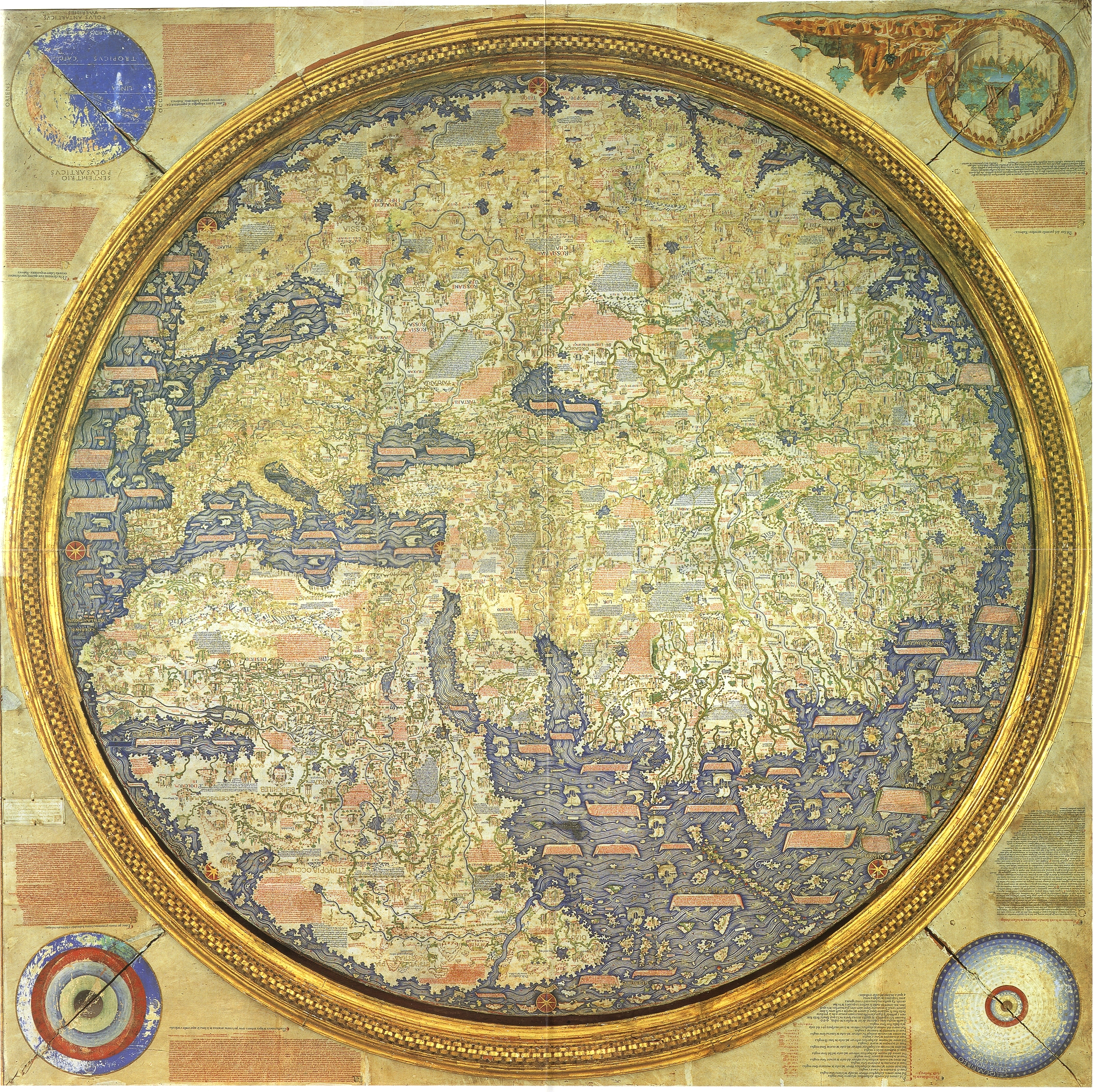
The world of La Province des ténèbres

After spending most of his childhood and adolescence at Roanne, Daniel Arsand practiced in Paris various professions in the world of books: first as bookseller, especially for the "Librairies Fontaine", he worked ten years as a literary advisor to various publishing houses among which La Manufacture de livres and Éditions Balland, before he joined the Éditions du Rocher as press officer. Finally, in 2000, he became a publisher of foreign literature at Éditions Phébus.

He made his debut as a writer in 1989 with a biography of Mireille Balin but his career as a novelist began in 1998 with La Province des ténèbres, a noticed work that earned him the prix Femina for first novel. This author, whom Michel Crépu, in L'Express dated 28 September 2000, dubbed "Arsand, the wild classic" because of the contrast between the harshness of his themes and the sobriety of his style, later published several novels and short stories, including En silence, which obtained the Grand prix Jean Giono for second novel.

At the same time, his role as a publisher is above all that of a "passer" ', that is to say a reader who allows the French-speaking public to discover foreign authors. In this sense, Daniel Arsand is the "passer" of William Trevor but also of three other Irish writers: Keith Ridgway (prix Femina étranger 2001), Hugo Hamilton (prix Femina étranger 2003) and Joseph O'Connor. He also had the Turkish novelist Elif Shafak's works translated.

He is the publisher of Certaines n'avaient jamais vu la mer by Julie Otsuka which was awarded the prix Femina étranger in 2012.

== Works ==
- 1989: Mireille Balin ou la beauté foudroyée, La Manufacture de livres
- 1996: Nocturnes, HB Éditeur
- 1998: La Province des ténèbres, Phébus, prix Femina for first novel
- 2000: En silence, Phébus, 2000, Grand prix Jean Giono of second novel.
- 2000: La Ville assiégée, Éditions du Rocher
- 2002: Lily, Phébus
- 2004: Ivresses du fils, Stock
- 2006: Des chevaux noirs, Stock
- 2008: Des amants, Stock, Grand prix Thyde Monnier of the Société des gens de lettres. English translation, Lovers, trans. Howard Curtis, Europa Editions, 2012.
- 2008: Alberto, Éditions du Chemin de fer
- 2011: Un certain mois d'avril à Adana (in French). Flammarion. 2011. ISBN 9782081258655., prix Chapitre of European novel
- 2013: Que Tal. Phébus
- 2016: Je suis en vie et tu ne m’entends pas, Actes Sud, ISBN 978-2-330-06042-8
