= Louis Maspero =

French writer (born 1959)

Louis Maspero (born 1959) is a French writer. He comes from the Maspero family, his father being the author Francois Maspero.

He is known for his novel Une île au bord du désert which won the Prix Alain-Fournier. He also published the novel Une vie d'Antonia in 1999.
