= Paul Greveillac =

French novelist (born 1981)

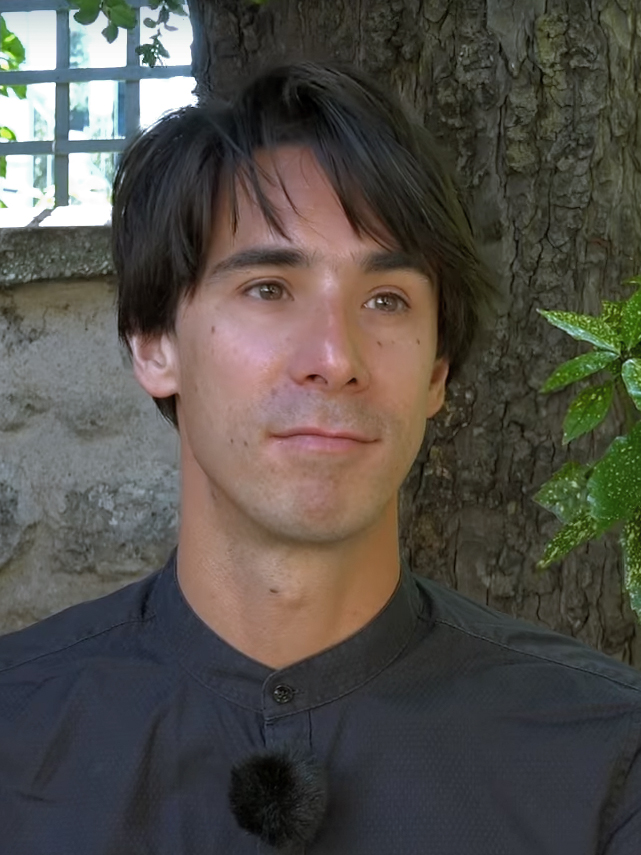
- Greveillac in 2018
- Born: 1981 (age 44–45)
- Occupation: Novelist
- Writing career
- Notable awards: Prix Roger Nimier (2016)

Paul Greveillac, sometimes spelled Gréveillac, (born 1981) is a French novelist and author of short stories.

Paul Greveillac was awarded the prix Roger Nimier as well as the "Bourse de la Découverte de la Fondation Prince Pierre de Monaco" for his first novel, Les Âmes rouges, whose story takes place at the time of the Soviet Union. The main character is a censor, lover of cinema and literature. Les Âmes rouges was also noticed by the Académie Goncourt, which placed it on its list of reading for the 2016 summer.

In April 2017, Cadence secrète. La vie invisible d'Alfred Schnittke was published by Gallimard. It is a fictionalized biography of late 20th century composer Alfred Schnittke.

His second novel, Maîtres et esclaves, was published in August 2018. It follows the journey of a peasant from Sichuan who, at the height of the Chinese Cultural Revolution, becomes a leading propaganda painter. Maîtres et esclaves was shortlisted for the final selections of the Goncourt Prize, the Interallié Prize, and the 2019 Deux Magots Prize. A finalist for the Goncourt Prize, the novel received four votes, compared with six for And Their Children After Them by Nicolas Mathieu. It won the Jean Giono Grand Prize in 2018 and was also awarded the Del Duca Foundation’s Literary Creation Support Prize that same year.

His third novel, Art Nouveau, was published in August 2020. The novel traces the emergence of Hungarian Art Nouveau through the story of Lajos Ligeti, a fictional Jewish architect from Vienna who attempts to establish his practice in Budapest. At the time, Austria-Hungary—beset by nationalism and antisemitism, and unknowingly in decline—was living through its final years. With this novel, Paul Greveillac also sought, in his own words, to show that “Europe before the First World War bears a strong resemblance (...) to our contemporary era.” Art Nouveau was shortlisted for the 2021 European Book Prize. In September 2021, the novel won the Chaumont Book Fair Prize.

L'étau was published in March 2022. Set partly during the Second World War and partly in the 2000s, the novel follows two protagonists who must confront the legacy of their father, a Prague businessman accused of collaborating with Reinhard Heydrich and the Nazis.

Phrase d'Armes was published in August 2023. The novel retraces the life of René Bondoux, Olympic team foil champion at the Los Angeles Games and Olympic silver medalist in the same event at the 1936 Berlin Olympics. He later became chief of staff to Jean de Lattre de Tassigny, a role that led him to witness the signing of Germany’s surrender on May 8, 1945.

Le creuset des sorciers : Histoire de l'esclave à mille mains qui inventa sa musique was published in February 2026. In this work, Paul Greveillac turns his attention to plantation-era Louisiana, slavery, and jazz. In a pre-publication review for Livres Hebdo, Jean-Claude Perrier praised it as “the most personal [novel]” by a “gifted young writer.” The novel imagines an ancestor of Miles Davis living on the Toutant-Beauregard family plantation. For the first time, the author also discusses his own mixed heritage and the origins of his pen name, inspired by Julien Gracq and Pierre Reverdy. TSF Jazz described it as a “captivating narrative.” The magazine LiRE called it “a great, deeply moving fresco, free of grandiloquence, and a superb tribute to jazz, ‘the offspring of an irrepressible freedom.’” According to Pèlerin Magazine, readers “are carried through to the end by the author’s melodious and enchanting prose.” The composer Karol Beffa also praises the novel, calling it “powerful and deeply crafted, successfully combining historical depth, stylistic ambition, and poetic sweep.”

== Works ==
- 2014: Les Fronts clandestins. Quinze histoires de Justes, Éditions Nicolas Eybalin, collection of short stories inspired by true stories of Righteous Among the Nations.
- 2016: Les Âmes rouges, Éditions Gallimard (collection Blanche), novel.
- 2017: Cadence secrète. La vie invisible d'Alfred Schnittke, Éditions Gallimard (collection Blanche), fictionalized biography.
- 2018: Maîtres et Esclaves, Éditions Gallimard (collection Blanche), novel.
- 2020 : Art Nouveau, Éditions Gallimard (collection Blanche), novel.
- 2022 : L’étau, Éditions Gallimard (collection Blanche), novel.
- 2023 : Phrase d’armes, Éditions Gallimard (collection Blanche), novel.
- 2026 : Le creuset des sorciers. Histoire de l'esclave à mille mains qui inventa sa musique, Éditions Gallimard (collection Blanche), novel.

== Honours ==
- 2016: Prix Roger-Nimier for Les Âmes rouges.
- 2016: Bourse de la Découverte de la Fondation Prince Pierre de Monaco for Les Âmes rouges.
- 2018 : Prix Pelléas-Radio Classique for Cadence secrète. La vie invisible d'Alfred Schnittke.
- 2018 : Grand prix Jean-Giono pour Maîtres et esclaves.
- 2018 : Prix de soutien à la création littéraire de la Fondation Del Duca for Maîtres et esclaves.
- 2019 : Prix des lecteurs de Levallois-Perret for Maîtres et esclaves.
- 2021 : Prix du Salon du livre de Chaumont for Art nouveau.
- 2022 : Prix littéraire de Pont-l'Évêque for L'étau.
- 2023 : Prix Coup de cœur de Livres en Vignes for Phrase d'armes.
