= Raphaël Jerusalmy =

French writer (born 1954)

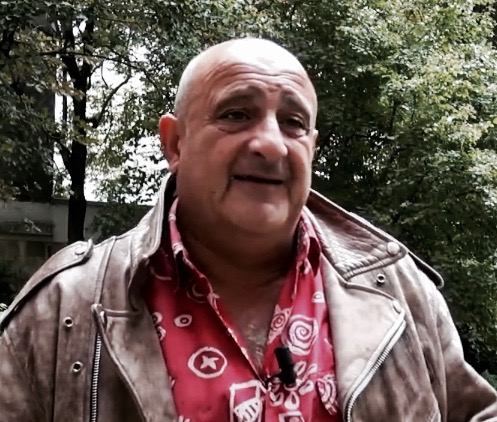
Raphaël Jerusalmy (2013)

Raphaël Jerusalmy (born 7 November 1954, in Paris) is a French writer.

== Biography ==
Raphaël Jerusalmy graduated from the École normale supérieure. After his studies, he joined the Israeli army, where he rapidly evolved into Intelligence Service. After fifteen years, he retired from the army and carried out educational and humanitarian actions, then became an old books dealer in Tel Aviv. He is also an "expert" on the TV channel I24news.

== Works ==
- 2002: Shalom Tsahal. Confessions d’un lieutenant-colonel des renseignements israéliens, Paris, NM 7 éditeur, 394 p. ISBN 2-913973-27-2.
- 2012: Sauver Mozart. Le Journal d'Otto J. Steiner, Arles, Actes Sud, series "Domaine français", 148 p. ISBN 978-2-330-00516-0

- Prix Emmanuel Roblès 2013.
- Prix littéraire de l'ENS Cachan.

Saving Mozart, translated to English by Howard Curtis, published by Europa Editions, 2013

- 2013: La Confrérie des chasseurs de livres, Actes Sud, series "Domaine français", 320 p. ISBN 978-2-330-02261-7.

The Brotherhood of Book Hunters, translated to English by Howard Curtis, published by Europa Editions, 2014

- 2016: Les obus jouaient à pigeon vole, Éditions Bruno Doucey, 177 p. ISBN 978-2-362-290947.
- 2017: Évacuation, Arles, Actes Sud, 128 p. ISBN 978-2-330-07572-9.
- 2018: La Rose de Saragosse, Arles, France, Actes Sud, 192 p. ISBN 978-2-330-09054-8
- 2022: In Absentia, Actes Sud, 176 p. ISBN 978-2330164362
