= Régine Detambel =

French author

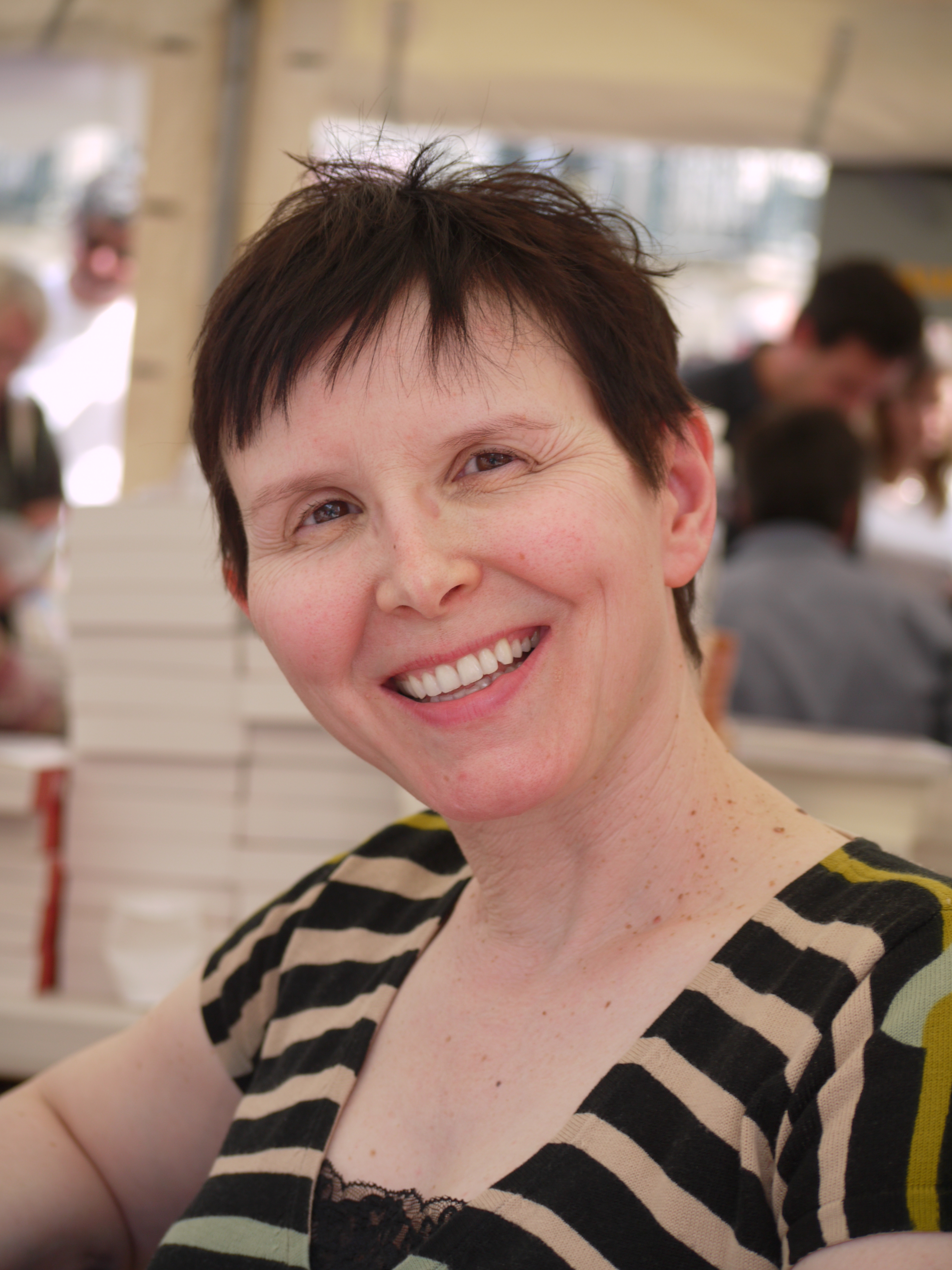
- Born: October 7, 1963 (age 62)
- Occupation: writer
- Awards: Alain Fournier Prize; Chevalier des Arts et des Lettres

Régine Detambel (born 1963) is a French writer.

She was born in 1963. | She published her first book in 1990, and has written prolifically ever since. Her works have been published primarily by Julliard, Le Seuil and Gallimard. She has won the Prix Anna de Noailles, the Alain Fournier Prize, and the Chevalier des Arts et des Lettres.

== Works ==
=== Fiction ===
1. L’Amputation, Julliard, 1990
2. L’Orchestre et la Semeuse, Julliard, 1990
3. La Modéliste, Julliard, 1990
4. Le Long Séjour, Julliard, 1991
5. La Quatrième Orange, Julliard, 1992
6. Le Vélin, Julliard, 1993
7. La Lune dans le rectangle du patio, Gallimard « Haute Enfance », 1994
8. Le Jardin clos, Gallimard « Blanche », 1994
9. Le Ventilateur, Gallimard « Blanche », 1995
10. La Verrière, Gallimard « Folio » no 3107, 1996
11. Elle ferait battre les montagnes, Gallimard « Blanche », 1997
12. La Patience sauvage, Gallimard « Blanche », 1999
13. La Chambre d’écho, Le Seuil « Points » no 1062, 2001
14. Mésanges, Gallimard « Blanche », 2003
15. Pandémonium, Gallimard « Blanche », 2006
16. Notre-Dame des Sept Douleurs, Gallimard « Haute Enfance », 2008
17. Noces de chêne, Gallimard « Blanche », 2008
18. Sur l’aile, Mercure de France, 2010
19. 50 histoires fraîches, Gallimard « Blanche », 2010
20. Son corps extrême, Actes Sud, 2011
21. Opéra sérieux, Actes Sud, 2012
22. Martin le Bouillant, publie.net, 2013
23. La Splendeur, Actes Sud, 2014
24. Le Chaste Monde, Actes Sud, 2014
25. Trois ex, Actes Sud, janvier 2017

=== Formes brèves ===
1. Les Écarts majeurs, Julliard, 1993
2. Album, Calmann-Lévy, coll. « Petite Bibliothèque Européenne du XXe siècle », 1995
3. Icônes, Poésie, Champ Vallon, 1996
4. Brèves histoires d’humour, 6 petits livres choisis et préfacés par R. Detambel, Mercure de France, 1997
5. La Ligne âpre, Christian Bourgois Éditeur, 1998
6. Blasons d’un corps enfantin, Fata Morgana, 2000
7. Graveurs d’enfance, Christian Bourgois Éditeur ; rééd. « Folio », no 3637, 2002
8. Emulsions, Poésie, Champ Vallon, 2003
9. Les enfants se défont par l’oreille, Fata Morgana, 2006
10. Le Musée Fabre par quatre chemins, Éditions Méridianes, février 2011
11. Blasons d’un corps masculin (Reprint), Publie.papier, publie.net, coll. Reprint, juillet 2012
12. Le Grand Élucidaire des choses de l’amour, linogravures de Bernard Alligand, Æncrages & Co, février 2014

=== Essays ===
1. Colette. Comme une flore, comme un zoo, Stock, 1997
2. L’Écrivaillon ou l’Enfance de l’écriture, Gallimard / « Haute Enfance », 1997
3. Bernard Noël, poète épithélial, Jean-Michel Place / Poésie, 2007
4. Petit éloge de la peau, Gallimard / "Folio 2 €" (n° 4482), 2007
5. Le Syndrome de Diogène, éloge des vieillesses, Actes Sud, 2008
6. Les livres prennent soin de nous. Pour une bibliothérapie créative, Actes Sud, 2015

=== For younger readers ===
1. La Comédie des mots, Gallimard, coll. « Page blanche », 1997 ; rééd. Gallimard Jeunesse Hors Série Littérature, 2004
2. Les Contes d’Apothicaire, Gallimard / « La Bibliothèque Gallimard » n°2, 1998
3. La Nouvelle Comédie des mots, Gallimard, coll. « Page blanche », 1999
4. Des petits riens au goût de citron, Éditions Thierry Magnier Nouvelles, 2008
5. Graveurs d'enfance, Christian Bourgois Editeur / « Folio » n°3637, 2002
6. La tête au ciel, Éditions Thierry Magnier Roman, 2013
7. La Boîte à lettres de Souriceau, texte Régine Detambel, illustrations de Beatrice Alemagna, Hachette jeunesse, 1999
