= Alain Delbe =

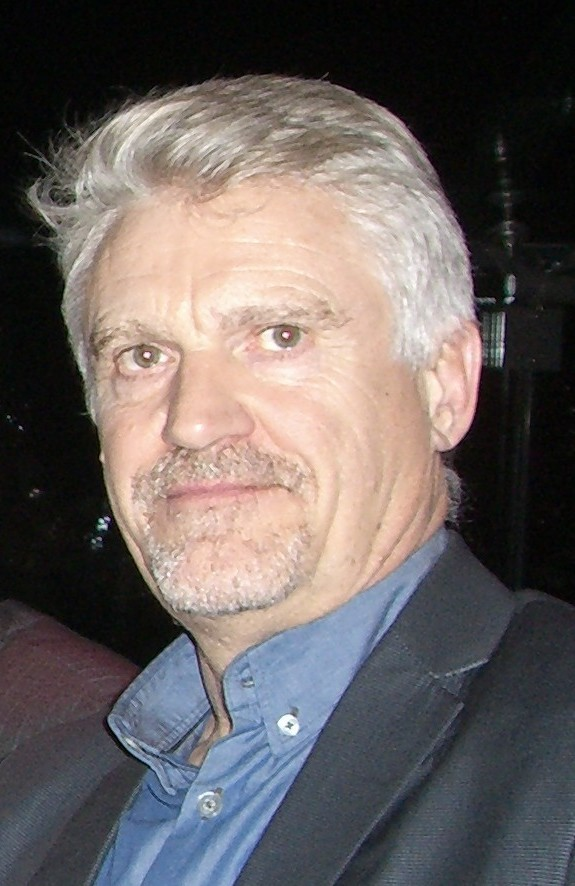
- Born: 24 October 1954 (age 71)
- Writing career
- Language: French
- Notable work: Les Îles jumelles

Alain Delbe (born 24 October 1954 in Douai) is a French writer, child psychologist and psychotherapist.

In 1994, he won the Prix Alain-Fournier for his novel Les Îles jumelles. He is also the author of novels François l'Ardent in 1999, Golems and Le complexe de Médée in 2004, Sigiriya, le Rocher du Lion in 2012, one of a trilogy of novels. He has also published criticism in the revues Otrante and Hauteurs. In 1995, he published with L'Harmattan, Le stade vocal, an essay of psychoanalysis, followed by a second in 2014, La voix contre le langage.

== Honours ==
- 1994 : Prix Alain-Fournier for Les Îles jumelles
