= Tatiana Arfel =

French writer (born 1979)

Tatiana Arfel (born 17 May 1979 in Paris) is a French writer.

== Biography ==
Psychologist by training, Tatiana Arfel is also a graduate in modern literature.

== Works ==
- 2008: L’Attente du soir, Paris, José Corti Éditions, series "Merveilleux", 325 p. ISBN 978-2-7143-0986-0.

- Prix du Salon du premier roman de Draveil 2009.
- Prix Emmanuel Roblès 2009.
- Prix Alain-Fournier 2010
- Prix des académiciens des Genêts de Bron 2009–2010
- Prix Jeune Talent littéraire des clubs de lecture de Saint Germain en Laye.
- Prix Biblioblog 2010.

- 2010: Des clous, Paris, José Corti Éditions, coll. « Domaine français », 319 p. ISBN 978-2-7143-1046-0.
- 2013: La Deuxième Vie d’Aurélien Moreau, Paris, José Corti Éditions, series "Domaine français", 319 p. ISBN 978-2-7143-1115-3
- 2015: Les Inconfiants, ill. de Julien Cordier, Marseille, France, Éditions Le Bec en l’air, 125 p. ISBN 978-2-36744-078-1
