= Patricia Erbelding =

French artist

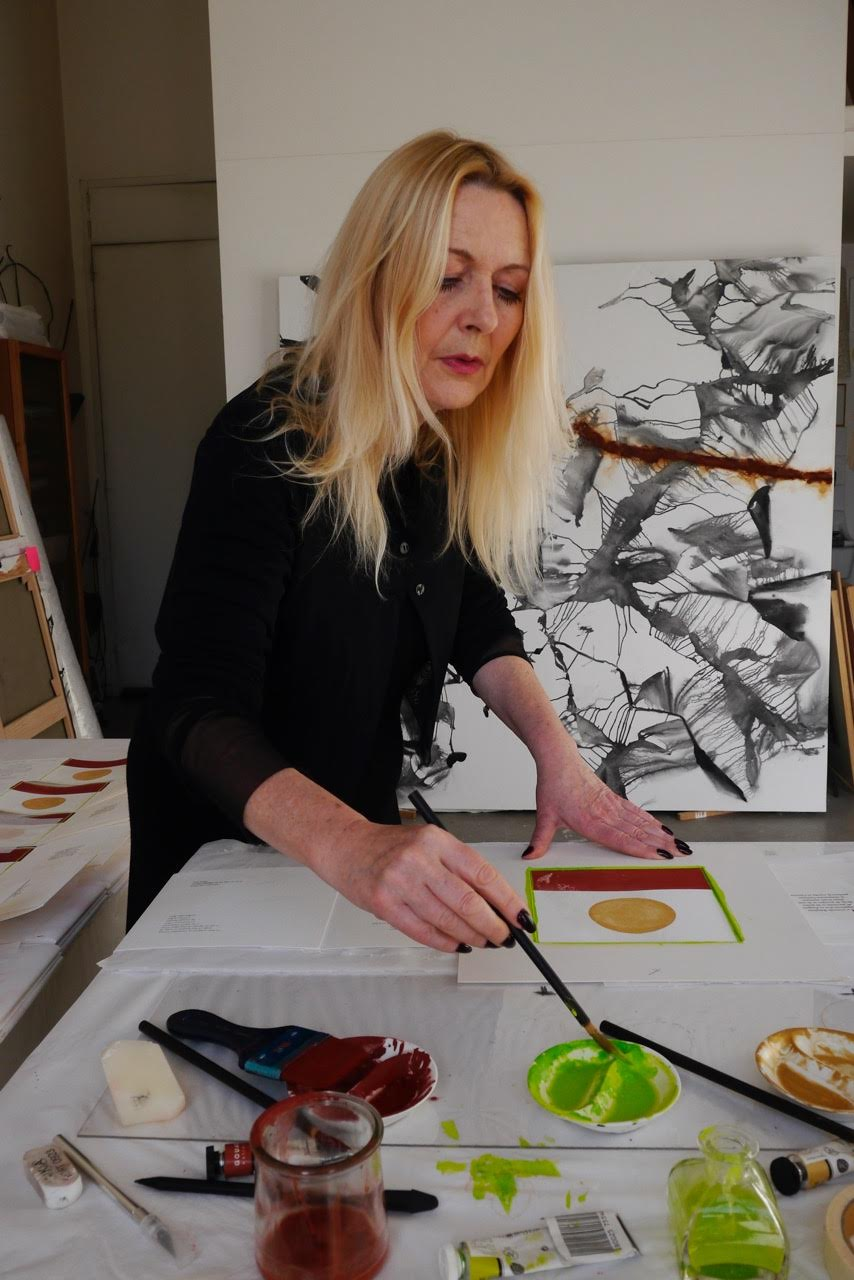
- Erbelding in her Paris studio
- Born: 1958 (age 67–68); Paris, France

Patricia Erbelding (born in Paris in 1958) is a French artist who works in a variety of media producing abstract art.

== Biography ==
Her first solo exhibition was held at the Galerie du Haut Pavé in Paris in 1993, curated by Jean Pierre Brice Olivier. Her work has been exhibited around the world and she is held in many collections both public and private. Her multidisciplinary artistic work spans painting, collage, sculpture, photography and artists’ books.

She grew up in France and most of her work is still produced in Paris where she has her studio.

After literary studies, she worked in a number of professions before starting painting full-time in 1988. She is a figure of the new scene in Abstract Art and is known for the unique technique in painting as well as for her Artist's books. Her work has been exhibited at the Industry Museum (now renamed "Bois du Cazier") of Charleroi in Belgium; the Nagoya Museum; the Toyama Museum; the Osaka Municipal Museum of Art and the Aichi Prefectural Museum of Art in Japan; the Taipei Fine Arts Museum, Taiwan; the Musée des Avelines, Saint Cloud, France; the Swedish American Museum in Chicago; the Museum of Modern Art, Maracaibo, Venezuela; the Sofia Imber Contemporary Art Museum, Caracas, Venezuela; the Metropolitan Museum of Art and Sejong Center in Seoul, Korea; the Collage Museum, Mexico; the Musée Barrois in Bar-Le-Duc, France; the Argonne Museum in Varennes, France; the O Art Museum, in Tokyo, Japan; the Art and Historical Museum of Montbeliard, France; the Leepa-Rattner Museum of Art, Tarpon Springs, Florida; the Austin Museum of Art, Austin, Texas. Her work was exhibited at the FSU Museum of Fine Arts, Tallahassee, Florida in 2011 and 2012.

In her new works Patricia Erbelding continues to place keen attention on the concepts of transformation and metamorphosis, their application to organic and inorganic materials, and the meaning behind and produced by the process of inscribing such materials herself. Metaphors of time passing and evolution are also at play in her photographic work. Erbelding is currently represented by Jacques Levy Gallery, Paris; Galerie Insula, Paris and Port-Joinville in Île d'Yeu; Art Forum Gallery, Antwerp, Belgium; Dhalgren Gallery, Paris; Envie D'Art, London; Le Cabinet Amateur Gallery, Paris and Eva Doublet Gallery, St Georges du Bois.

== Background ==
Erbelding was raised in the suburbs of Paris and studied literature at the University of Paris III: Sorbonne Nouvelle. Through her family she nevertheless inherited an artistic tradition – her father sculpted and her uncle painted. In 1983 she started working in an engraving studio on printmaking. While she perfected the techniques of intaglio and etching she also started working in painting and clay. Her early works included painted photography and collages and at the same early period she also produced her first Artist's books. After a few years, Erbelding refined what have been a trademark technique involving Iron oxidations and beeswax.

== Techniques and processes ==
Erbelding apply an oxidation process which acts almost as an etching of the paper-coated canvas – the characteristic lines that forms are practically burnt into the media through the oxidation process. There is a clear link with her earlier works in etching. A slow and rigorous production process is a distinguishing feature. For her works, she uses acrylic and oil paint, paper, beeswax and iron oxide.

Photography appeared in her work in 1995 and was also important in her creation of artists books. Her artist's books are realized as collaborations with writers and poets such as Joël Bastard, Michel Bohbot, Michel Butor, Serge Gavronsky, Hubert Lucot, Tita Reut and more.

She has also produced cover art and illustrations for books, notably for Christina Mengert at Burning Deck Press.

== Career ==
=== Early years ===
Her first solo exhibition at the Haut Pave Gallery which was well received was followed by a number of other gallery shows in Paris and other cities. Works from this period was often noted for its likeness to epidermis with the oxidation traces as scar tissue. Erbelding was elected to be Artist in Residence in 1995 at the Ponts De Sambre Art Center in Charleroi in Belgium.

Next year in 1996, she received a grant from the Wallonie Center in Paris and the French Embassy in Belgium and developed a series of forged iron sculptures produced in the Industry Museum of Charleroi. She also invited the artist Tony Soulié to work there and in 1997 their sculptures were exhibited at the Museum together with paintings and photographs. Her 1998 artist's book “Gestes”, a collaboration with the poet Pierre Marc Levergeois was included in the collection of the New York MOMA Library.

=== Later years ===
Today, Erbelding has established her studio in the 19th arrondissement of Paris where in 2003 she took part in a street art event organized by Christine Phal. 2003 also saw the kick-off for the world-travelling exhibition “8th international shoebox sculpture exhibition” initiated by the University of Hawai Art Gallery that were to visit 16 different museums and art centers over two years.

She has regular solo exhibitions at the Jacques Levy Gallery in Paris since 2003, beginning with “Vues des anges”, an exhibition based on a poem of Rainer Maria Rilke. Will follow “Cinabre” in 2005, “Interstate”(photographic work) in 2006, “Noir” in 2007, “Urban Legend” in 2009 and recently in 2011 with “Lost Paradise” where she refers to Milton's poem “Paradise Lost” in a game of white and light blue paintings where the blue sphere of melancholia imposes its presence.

A first monograph of her work “L’Etat des métamorphoses“ was published in 2005 by Art Inprogress with text and poems by Tita Reut, translated by Keith Waldrop and in 2007, she was selected into the 14th International Art Exhibition at the National Art Center in Tokyo.

2008 saw her photographic work in the “Y’a pas photo” exhibition at the Fondation Nationale des Arts Graphiques et Plastiques (MABA) in Nogent sur Marne.

In 2009 was held at the Espace Saint Louis Art Center, in collaboration with the Barrois Museum, Médiathèque and Theatre in Bar-le-Duc, France, her solo exhibition : “La peinture à livre ouvert”. Large scale paintings and artists books were presented. The subject matter was the link between painting and writing. She was featured in a number of collective shows throughout 2010, among others: with the Denjoy collection at the Leepa-Rattner Museum of Art in Tarpon Springs, Florida and Artita-2010 in Piran, Slovenia. She also collaborated on a number of Artist's Books including an edition of “Carcasses” with Eric Coisel and Michel Butor and “The Ghost Lemur of William S. Burroughs” with Tony Soulié.

2011 saw Erbelding featured at the 26th Annual Tallahassee International at the FSU Museum of Fine Art as well as in the International Art Fair (SETEC) in Seoul. A book on her works “H2O“, by Corine Girieud was also published.

In 2012, she received an award for the 2012 Professional Women Photographers exhibition in New York, juried by Mary Ellen Mark and had a major exhibition during the summer at the Eva Doublet Gallery.

Curated by Lucette Bielle, the Musée du Vin of Paris hosted an exhibition of Erbelding's works in 2013 This followed the collaboration between Erbelding and the Domaine de Viaud Vineyard in Pomerol, managed by Bielle, where one of her paintings is used for the label on the 2007 vintage.

At the 2014 opening of The Peninsula Paris hotel, Erbelding's artworks are found in every room of the building.

The Artists’ book in collaboration with the writer Régine Detambel “Elle est le Monde”, is part of the “Magic Unicorns” reopening of the Musée de Cluny in 2018. Also in 2018, takes place “Signes Sensibles”, at the Château du Val Fleury in Gif-sur-Yvette bringing together Erbelding with Coskun, Michel Haas and Claude Viallat in an exhibition curated by Laurence d’Ist, exploring the echoes of prehistoric cave painting through contemporary art. Most recently, Erbelding's work on murmurations was featured by the Grande Chartreuse Museum.
