= Karima Berger =

Algerian writer

Karima Berger is an Algerian writer. She was born in Ténès, Algeria. Since 1975, she has lived in France, where she studied for a doctorate in political science. She has written many books about her spiritual roots and the encounter between Arab and French cultures.

She was president of the Prix Écritures et Spiritualités (formerly the Prix des Écrivains croyants) founded in 1977.

== Books ==
- Les Attentives. Un dialogue avec Etty Hillesum
- Éclats d'Islam. Chroniques d'un itinéraire spirituel
- L'Enfant des deux mondes
- Hégires
- Mektouba
- Toi, ma sœur étrangère
- Filiations dangereuses (winner of the Alain Fournier Prize)
- La Chair et le rôdeur
- Rouge Sang Vierge
