= Gremillion =

Gremillion is a surname. Notable people with the surname include:

- Jean Gremillion (1901–1959), French film director
- John Gremillion (born 1967), American voice actor
- Kristen Gremillion (born 1958), American anthropologist

== See also ==
- Grillon
