= Ngor (island) =

Island off the coast of Senegal

- Location within Senegal
- Interactive map of Ngor

Geography
- Location: Atlantic Ocean
- Coordinates: 14.7559°N 17.5143°W

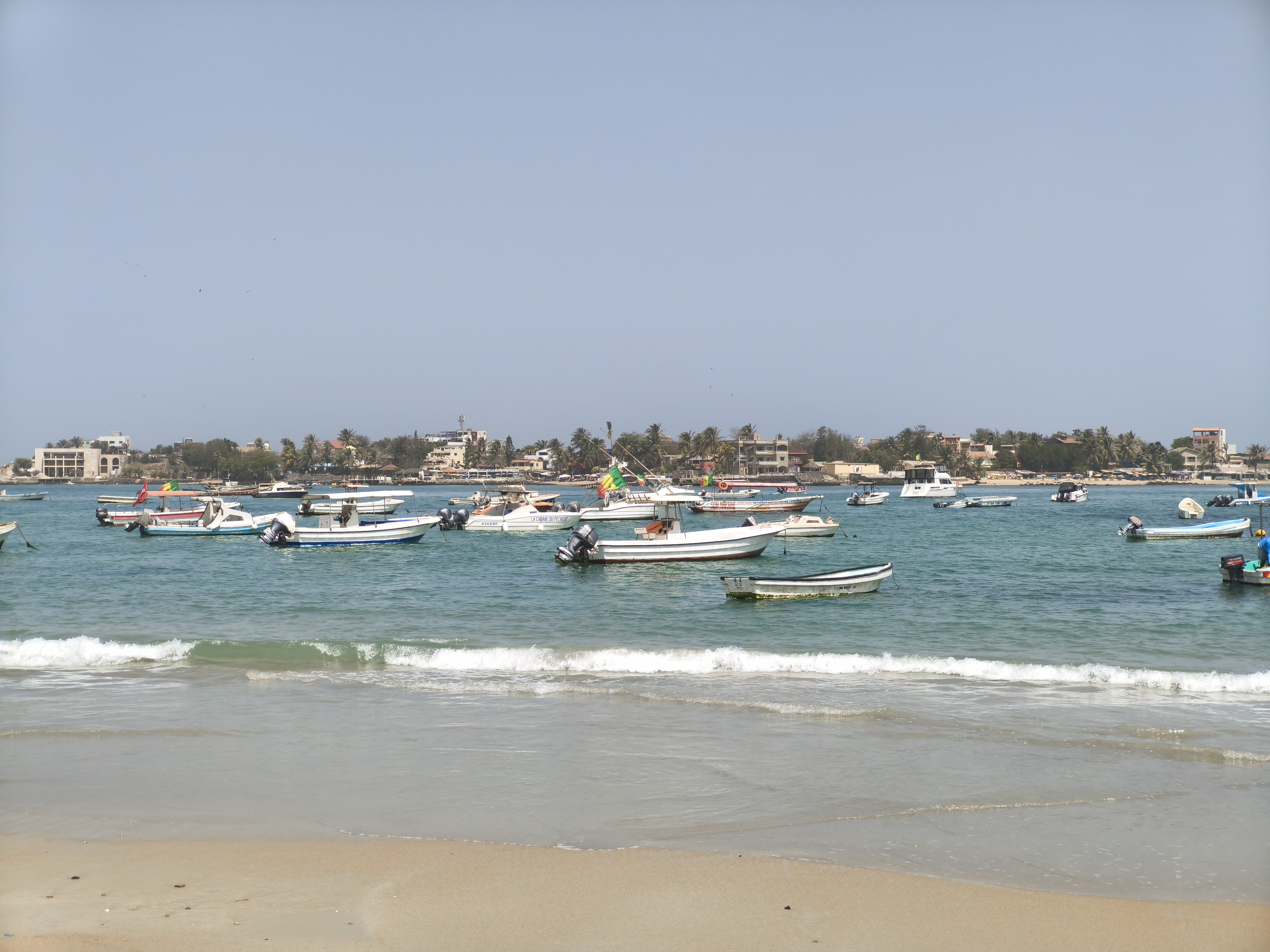
Ngor Island seen from the village of Ngor (Dakar)

Ngor (French: Île de Ngor) is an island off the coast of Dakar, Senegal. There are many beaches on all sides of the island. A popular activity in summer is a swim from Dakar to Ngor.

The island is reachable by boat, with a travel time of about 10 to 15 minutes from the mainland. Ferry rides typically cost between 1000 and 3000 XOF for a round trip Ngor Island offers activities, including swimming, surfing, and scuba diving.
