= Estelle Nollet =

French writer (born 1977)

Estelle Nollet (French: [ɛstɛl nɔlɛ]; born 1977 in Central African Republic) is a French writer.

== Works ==
- 2009: On ne boit pas les rats-kangourous, Paris, Albin Michel, series "Romans Français", 327 p. ISBN 978-2-226-19397-1

- Bourse Thyde Monnier de la SGDL (2009), Prix Obiou (2010), Prix Emmanuel Roblès (2010), Double Prix du jury et du public du premier roman de Chatou.

- 2011: Le Bon, la Brute, etc. , Albin Michel, series "Romans Français", 341 p. ISBN 978-2-226-22974-8.
- 2015: Quand j'étais vivant, Albin Michel, series "Romans Français", 272 p. ISBN 978-2-226-31248-8.
