= Armel Job =

Belgian writer (born 1948)

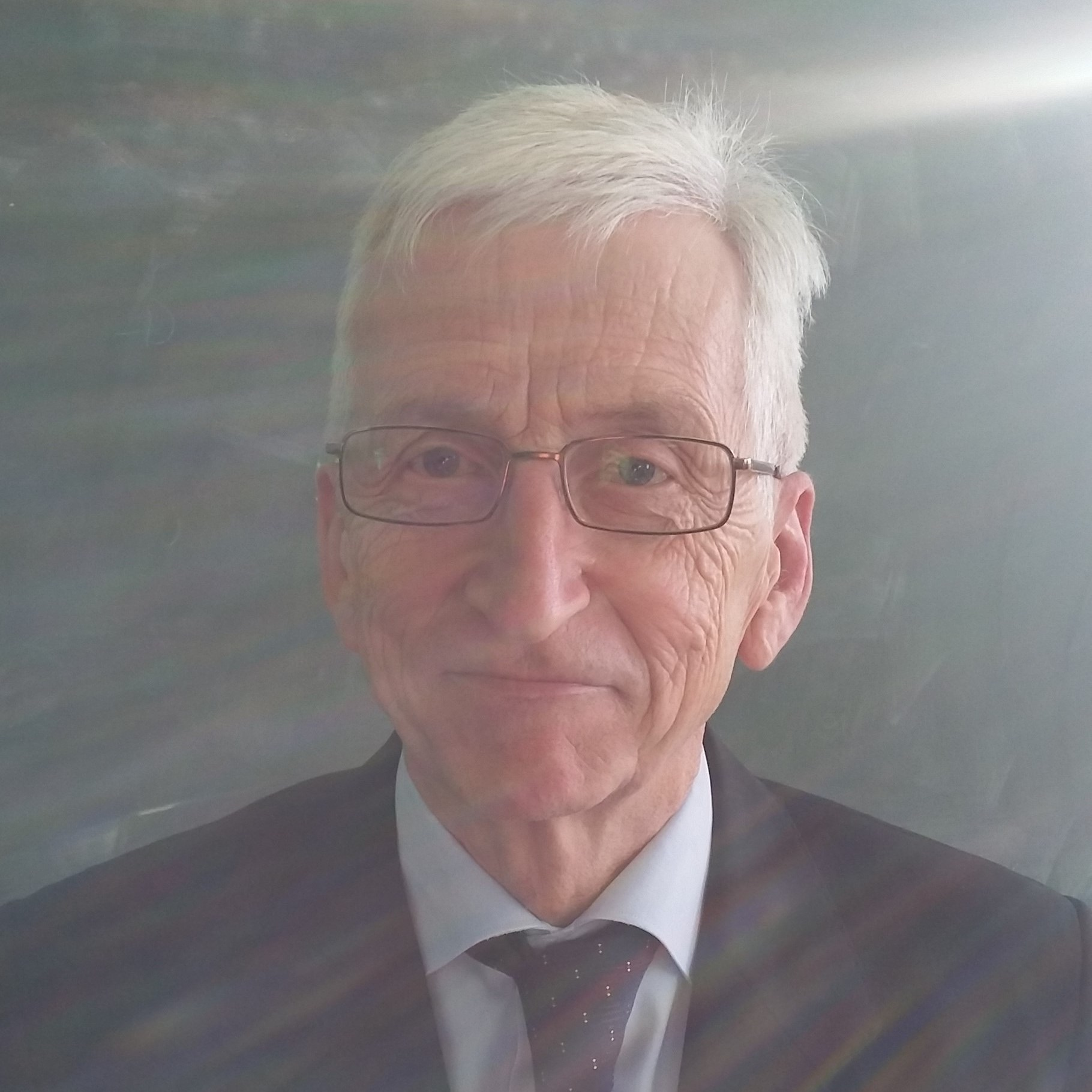
Armel Job (2016)

Armel Job (born 24 June 1948 in Heyd, Durbuy) is a Belgian writer of French language, former Director of the Institut Notre Dame Séminaire of Bastogne (INDSé).

== Youth ==
Armel was the third in a family of four boys. His father was a mattress-maker, then a grain dealer, and his grandfather was a horse dealer.

Armel entered the Bastogne seminary at the age of twelve, where Latin and Greek formed the basis of his education. He also studied the piano and played in the school orchestra. He was a member of the student theater.

He pursued university studies at the University of Liège. His undergraduate degree was in philosophy and letters, with graduate degrees in classical philology and secondary education.

== Public life ==
He was hired as a teacher of Latin and Greek at the same seminary in Bastogne where he had previously been a pupil. He taught there for twenty-three years and held various management positions from 1993 to 2010. The father of three daughters, he lives in the Bastogne region. Throughout his career he published specialized articles in the Journals of Belgian Catholic Education and continued to work on translations of Latin and Greek. He left teaching in 2010 to devote himself to his literary work. In 2011, he created the Prix du 2e roman francophone, a popular prize that immediately met with great popularity (more than 1700 readers).

Armel Job has published about twenty novels. His Fausses innocences was adapted to cinema under the same title by André Chandelle in 2009.

Armel Job is also a playwright. His play Le Conseil de Jerusalem was presented as a reading show in Liège, Brussels, Paris, within the framework of the Popular Universities of the Theater of Jean-Claude Idée.

== Prizes ==
- 2011: Prix René Fallet of first novel, for La Femme manquée
- 2002: Prix Victor Rossel des jeunes for Helena Vannek
- 2003 and 2011: Prix des lycéens de littérature for Helena Vannek
- 2005: Grand prix Jean-Giono for Les Fausses Innocences, a novel that unfolds in the German-speaking part of Belgium.
- 2007: Prix de la personnalité Richelieu; Ce prix, attribué par l'ensemble des clubs belges et luxembourgeois du Richelieu international, récompense une personnalité pour sa contribution à la promotion de la langue et de la culture françaises.
- 2010: Prix Simenon for Tu ne jugeras point
- 2011: Prix des lycéens de littérature, he received the two prizes at stake, the prix des délégués and the prix des lycéens for his novel published in 2009, Tu ne jugeras point. He is thus, with Bernard Tirtiaux, one of the few authors to have been awarded twice by young readers of the prix des lycéens.
- Prix Marcel-Thiry de la Ville de Liège for Dans la gueule de la bête
- 2011: Officier de l'Ordre du Mérite wallon.
- Chevalier de la Pléiade, ordre de la Francophonie et du dialogue des Cultures

== Bibliography ==
=== Éditions Robert Laffont ===
- 1999: La Femme manquée, ISBN 978-2-221-09118-0
- 2001: Baigneuse nue sur un rocher, ISBN 978-2-221-09433-4
- 2002: Helena Vannek, ISBN 978-2-221-09704-5
- 2003: Le Conseiller du roi, ISBN 978-2-221-09898-1
- 2005: Les Fausses Innocences, ISBN 978-2-221-10410-1
- 2007: Les Mystères de Sainte Freya, ISBN 978-2-221-10955-7
- 2009: Tu ne jugeras point, ISBN 9782221112328
  - Prix des lycéens 2011.
- 2011: Les Eaux amères, ISBN 9782221123805
- 2012; Loin des mosquées, ISBN 978-2-221-12953-1
- 2013; Le Bon Coupable, ISBN 9782221134290
- 2014: Dans la gueule de la bête, ISBN 9782221140918
- 2015: De regrettables incidents, ISBN 978-2-221-15693-3
- 2016: Et je serai toujours avec toi, ISBN 9782221191408

=== L'Harmattan ===
- 1995: La reine des Spagnes, ISBN 978-2738431721
- 1998: La malédiction de l'abbé Choiron, ISBN 978-2738465818

=== Éditions Weyrich ===
- 2011: La malédiction de l'abbé Choiron, reissue expanded of notes on the Walloon speech and a postface.
- 2016: Sept histoires pas très catholiques, ISBN 2874893838, short stories

=== Éditions Mijade ===
- 2002: Helena Vannek,
- 2008: Le commandant Bill, ISBN 2874230294
- 2011: Les lunettes de John Lennon, ISBN 9782874230561

=== Éditions MEMOR ===
- 2002: De la salade !, ISBN 293013349X

=== Éditions Labor ===
- 2004: La femme de saint Pierre, ISBN 978-2804021351

=== Éditions De Boeck ===
- 2016: La mort pour marraine, theatre
