= Xavier Hanotte =

Belgian writer

Xavier Hanotte is a Belgian writer. He was born in Mont-sur-Marchienne in 1960. He lives near Brussels. He studied the German language and entered a literary career through translation. He translated Dutch authors such as Hubert Lampo, and was particularly attached to the young English poet, Wilfred Owen, who died in 1918 a few days before the armistice. With Manière Noire, published in 1995, Hanotte commenced a romantic cycle around the character of Barthelemy Dussert, a Brussels police inspector who would become the literary alter ego of the writer. Dussert also appeared in De secrètes injustices (1998), Le Couteau de Jenufa (2008), and Derrière la colline (2000, Prix Marcel Thiry) which takes place on the Somme front during the First World War, and features a young poet named Nigel Parsons. The Great War also forms the backdrop of Lieux communs (2002). The 2010 novel Feux fragiles dans la nuit qui vient, set in an imaginary country, was compared to the work of Julien Gracq and Dino Buzzati.

Xavier Hanotte is published by Belfond and Castor Astral. Four of his books are published in Espace-Nord.
