= Michel Calonne =

French writer

Michel Calonne (28 March 1927, Grenoble - 4 March 2019) was a French writer.

== Works ==
- 1958: Le Plus Jeune fils de l'écureuil (short stories), éditions Robert Laffont
- 1960: Une folie au bord de la mer (novel), ed. Robert Laffont
- 1981: Hurleville (novel), Éditions Jean-Claude Lattès
- 1990: Les Enfances (novel), Éditions Viviane Hamy, (Grand prix Jean-Giono 1991).
- 1991: Un silex à la mer (poetry), Éditions Gallimard, (prix Heredia 1992).
- 1993: L'Arbre jongleur (poetry), Maison de Poésie Fondation Émile Blémont/Presses universitaires de Nancy, (prix Verlaine).
- 1997: Les Angelicos (theatre), L'Harmattan
- 2003: Le Bonbonnier, Pré carré
- 2009: Chroniques de la destruction de Paris : poème en dix-huit scènes
