= Hélène Grémillon =

French writer (born 1977)

Hélène Grémillon (born 8 February 1977 in Poitiers) is a French novelist.

== Biography ==
Hélène Grémillon studied literature and obtained a master's degree in Modern Literature and Linguistics then turned to history, thus obtaining a DEA from the University of Versailles and Sciences-Po Paris.

Her first novel, Le Confident, published in 2010, quickly became a best seller. Translated into more than 30 languages, it sold more than 500 000 copies worldwide. Le Confident is a love story, recounting the life of Camille in the 1970s, who receives a letter from an unknown sender after her mother's death, between the year 1938 and the year 1942.

She radically changes scenery in her second novel, La Garçonnière, a suspense novel inspired by a real drama, set in Argentina in Buenos Aires in 1987. This novel was translated into twenty languages and sold over 300 000 copies worldwide.

She co-wrote the film "Presque" with Bernard Campan et Alexandre Jollien (2022) and the 2026 animated film "Les Legendaires" - loosely inspired by Patric Sobral's hit comic books, directed by Guillaume Ivernel.

She co-wrote with Minh Tran Hui and directed a national awareness campaign on autism for the French government, featuring Paul Mirabel, Élie Semoun, Francis Perrin, Gersende et Louis Perrin.

She is also the co-producer and artistic collaborator of Julien Clerc's stage productions alongside director Ladislas Chollat.

She married French singer Julien Clerc on the 17th December 2012 in Paris. Together, they had a son, Leonard.

== Works ==
- 2010: Le Confident, Paris, Éditions Plon, 301 p. ISBN 978-2-259-21251-9 / Pocket in Folio Gallimard

- Lauriers Verts de La Forêt des Livres - Prix du Premier Roman 2010
- Prix Jeune Talent Littéraire des Clubs de Lecture de Saint-Germain-en-Laye 2011
- Prix Emmanuel Roblès - Prix des lecteurs de la Ville de Blois 2011
- Prix du Premier roman de femme - Coup de Cœur du Jury 2011
- Prix Palissy 2011.

- 2013: La Garçonnière, Paris, Éditions Flammarion, coll. « Littérature française », 356 p. ISBN 978-2-08-130887-9./ Pocket in Folio Gallimard

- 2020: Presque, with Bernard Campan et Alexandre Jollien
- 2026: Les Legendaires, directed by Guillaume Invernel.
