= Serge Gavronsky =

American poet and translator (born 1932)

- Born: 1932 (age 93–94); Paris, France
- Occupation: Poet

Academic background
- Education: Columbia College

Serge Gavronsky (born 1932) is an American poet and translator.

== Life ==
Gavronsky was born in Paris. He fled Nazi-occupied France in 1940. Gavronsky received his A.B. in European History and French in 1954 from Columbia College and an M.A. in European History in 1955 and a Ph.D. in European Intellectual History in 1965 from Columbia University, and is now professor emeritus in the French department at Barnard College. He lives in New York City.

Gavronsky is currently working on his sixth novel and in the process of co-translating, with François Dominique, the poem "A" by Louis Zukofsky.

== Awards ==
- 1979 Guggenheim Fellowship
- 1980 Camargo Foundation Fellowship
- 1990 Sole judge appointed by the Academy of American Poets for the Harold Morton Landon Prize in Translation
- 1991 French Government, Chevalier dans l'Ordre des Palmes Académiques
- 1997 French Government, Officier dans l'Ordre des Arts et des Lettres

== Works ==
=== Novels ===
- The German Friend, a novel (New York, SUN, 1984.)
- The Name of the Father, a novel (Spiralli, 1993) Translated into Italian with a preface by Harold Bloom.
- L'Identita, a novel, a novel (Spiralli, 2006.) Translated into Italian.
- The Sudden Death of…, a novel (NY: Spuyten Duyvil, 2009.)
- Silence of Memory, a novel (Spuyten Duyvil, 2014.)

=== Poetry ===
Books of Poetry:

- AndOrThe: Poems Within a Poem (Talisman House, 2007)

Gavronsky has appeared in over thirty French and American poetry magazines including:

- Lectures et compte-rendu, poèmes. Coll. "Textes," Flammarion, 1973.
- Je le suis, poème, illustrations by Michel Kanter, artists's edition, 1995.
- L’interminable discussion, poem with six original woodcuts by JM. Scanreigh. Editions Philippe Millereau, 1996.
- Reduction du tryptique, poem with 4 original woodcuts by JM. Scanreigh, Philippe Millereau, 1996.
- Il était un dire, poem for artist's book by Patricia Erbelding (Mémoires Collections, 2007)

=== Translation ===
A selection of books in translation:

- Poems & texts; an anthology of French poems: translations, and interviews with Ponge, Follain, Guillevic, Frénaud, Bonnefoy, DuBouchet, Roche, and Pleynet. October House. 1969.
- Patricia Terry, Serge Gavronsky, ed. (1975). Modern French Poetry : a Bilingual Anthology. Columbia University Press.
- Serge Gavronsky, Francis Ponge: The Power of Language. (1979). University of California Press.
- Le mecanisme du sens (Paris: Maeght, 1979).
- Joyce Mansour, Cris/Screams, trans. with an Introduction by Serge Gavronsky (Sausolito, CA: Post-Apollo Press, 1995.)
- Serge Gavronsky, ed. (1997). Six contemporary French women poets: theory, practice, and pleasures. Southern Illinois University Press. ISBN 9780809321155.
- Toward a new poetics: contemporary writing in France : interviews, with an introduction and translated texts. University of California Press. 1994. ISBN 978-0-520-08793-4. KrGO4IrgcgsC&dq=Serge+Gavronsky&printsec=frontcover&source=an&hl=en&ei=BThASpvSN8bKlAeliZjKAQ&sa=X&oi=book_result&ct=result&resnum=5.
- Translator and author of introduction, Joyce Mansour Essential Poetry and Prose (Boston: Black Widow Press, 2008.)
- Co-Translator with François Dominique, writer, "Louis Zukofsky’s “A” – 13 - 18 (Dijon: Virgile, 2012).
- Co-Translator with François Dominique, "Louis Zukofsky’s “A” – 19 - 23 (Dijon: Virgile, 2014).

A selection of anthologized poems in translation:

- Jean Follain, Modern European Poetry, Bantam Classics, 1967.
- René Depestre, The World, Special Translation Issue, 1973.
- Aragon, For Neruda/For Chile, Beacon, 1975.
- Francis Ponge, Contemporary World Poetry, Harcourt, Brace, Jovanovich, 1979.
- Marcelin Pleynet, André Frénaud, Francis Ponge, Random House Anthology of Twentieth-Century French Poetry, 1982.
- Monique Buri, The Defiant Muse, French Feminist Poems from the Middle Ages to the Present, The Feminist Press, 1986.
- Jean Frémon, Denis Roche and Marcelin Pleynet in Violence of the White Page: Contempo-rary French Poetry, Tyuonyi, 1992.
- Francis Ponge, Against Forgetting, Twentieth-Century Poetry of Witness, Norton, 1993.
- Francis Ponge, "The Sun...," Poems for the Millenium, The University of California Press, I, 1995.
- Francis Ponge, "Rhetoric," World Poetry, Norton, 1998.
- Francis Ponge, “The Object is Poetics,” in Mary Ann Caws, ed. Manifesto: A Century of Isms, Nebraska University Press, 2001.

=== Criticism ===
- The French Liberal Opposition and the American Civil War. (New York, The Humanities Press, 1968.)
- Francis Ponge and the Power of Language. (Berkeley, California, The University of California Press, 1979.)
- Culture/Ecriture, essais critiques. (Rome, Bulzoni, 1983.)
- "BLACK THEMES IN SUREAL GUISE". The New York Times. February 19, 1984.
- Gavronsky, Serge (November 5, 1989). "'DON'T ASK. ACT'". The New York Times.
- Towards a New Poetics (Berkeley, California, The University of California Press, 1994.)
