= Emmanuel Roblès =

French writer

- Born: 4 May 1914; Oran, French Algeria
- Died: 22 February 1995 (aged 80); Boulogne, Hauts-de-Seine, France
- Occupations: Novelist, screenwriter
- Writing career
- Notable works: Montserrat, 1948
- Notable awards: Prix Femina; 1948

Emmanuel Roblès (4 May 1914 in Oran, French Algeria – 22 February 1995 in Boulogne, Hauts-de-Seine) was a French author and playwright. He was elected a member of the Académie Goncourt in 1973. He was one of many influential pieds-noirs of his time. The Prix Emmanuel Roblès literary award was established in his honour in 1990.

== Selected bibliography ==
- La Vallée du paradis (1940)
- Travail d'homme (1942)
- La Marie des quatres vents (1942), short story
- Nuits sur le monde (1944), short stories
- L'Action (1946)
- Les Hauteurs de la ville (1948), winner of the Prix Femina
- Montserrat (1948), play
- La Mort en face (1951), short stories
- Cela s'appelle l'aurore (1952)
- Federica (1954)
- Les Couteaux (1956), novel about Mexico
- L'Homme d'Avril (1959), short stories (title story about Japan)
- Le Vésuve (1961)
- Jeunes saisons (1961), autobiography
- La Remontée du fleuve (1962)
- La Croisière (1968)
- Un Printemps d'Italie (1970)
- L'Ombre et la rive (1972), short stories
- Saison violente (1974)
- Un Amour sans fin (1976)
- Les Sirènes (1977)
- L'Arbre invisible (1979)
- Venise en hiver (1981)
- La chasse à la licorne (1985)
- Norma, ou, L'Exil infini (1988)
- Albert Camus et la trêve civile (1988), criticism
- Les Rives du fleuve bleu (1990), short stories
- Cristal des jours (1990), poetry
- L'Herbe des ruines (1992)
- Erica (1994), short stories
- Camus, frère de soleil (1995), biography
