= The Heart (novel) =

2014 novel by Maylis de Kerangal

The Heart (US) Mend the Living (UK)
- 2017 US paperback edition cover
- Author: Maylis de Kerangal
- Original title: Réparer les vivants
- Translator: Sam Taylor (US); Jessica Moore (UK)
- Language: French
- Genre: Realistic fiction Medical fiction
- Published: January 1, 2014 (French) February 9, 2016 (US English) June 23, 2016 (UK English)
- Publisher: Éditions Verticales (French) Farrar, Straus and Giroux (US English) MacLehose Press (UK English)
- Publication place: France
- Pages: 242
- ISBN: 0-374-24090-6

The Heart is a 2014 realistic and medical fiction novel by the French author Maylis de Kerangal. It chronicles the events immediately following the death of 19-year-old Simon Limbres in a car accident. In particular, The Heart focuses on the transplantation of Simon's heart and how it affects those involved in the process, including Simon's parents, the physicians, the nurses, the organ transplant coordinators, the recipient, and the recipient's family, over the course of twenty-four hours.

The novel was first published in France as Réparer les vivants in 2014 by Éditions Verticales, and was then published in the United States in 2016 by Farrar, Straus, and Giroux as The Heart, and in the UK as Mend the Living, also in 2016, by MacLehose Press. The Heart received critical acclaim from both Francophone and Anglophone reviewers for its lyrical prose, emotional development, and humanism. It has been performed as a theater play in France since 2015. A film adaptation, Heal the Living, was released in 2016.

== Plot ==
Early one Sunday morning near Le Havre, France, 19-year old Simon Limbres and his two friends, Christophe Alba and Johan Rocher, go surfing. While driving back home, the boys get into a car accident, in which Christophe and Johan are only mildly injured while Simon experiences severe bodily trauma and immediately slips into a coma. It is soon determined that Christophe and Johan were wearing seat belts, while Simon was not.

At the hospital, Dr. Pierre Révol, the head physician of the intensive care unit (ICU) department, discovers that Simon is unresponsive to auditory, visual, and tactile stimulation, and that his brain has suffered irreversible damage. Eventually, Dr. Révol declares Simon to be in a state of brain death, in which he can only maintain involuntary cardiac and respiratory functions with the assistance of a ventilator and other machines, and he does not display any cerebral activity. Immediately after this declaration, Dr. Révol deems Simon an ideal organ donor due to his young age and excellent health prior to his passing and subsequently notifies Thomas Rémige, the head of the Coordinating Committee for Organ and Tissue Removal.

Meanwhile, Marianne Limbres, Simon's mother, is the first person to be notified of his admission into the ICU. She contacts and locates Simon's father, Sean, from whom she is separated, and they go to the hospital together to see their son. Upon their arrival, Marianne and Sean are notified by Dr. Révol that Simon's injuries are irreversible and that he has ultimately passed away. Sean indignantly accuses Dr. Révol and the rest of the ICU staff for not doing enough to save Simon, while Marianne, along with her husband, grapples with their son's death and blames herself for failing to protect him from his precarious lifestyle. The couple is then introduced to Thomas, who attempts to convince them to authorize the donation of Simon's organs. Initially, both parents, especially Sean, are hesitant, citing the symbolic significance of Simon's body and their fear of it being destroyed during the transplantation process. Eventually, Marianne realizes that allowing Simon to surf and live his life the way he did was the best thing she and Sean had done for him, and she decides to accept Thomas' request to donate Simon's organs. She then convinces Sean to do the same. Ultimately, Marianne and Sean permit Simon's heart, liver, lungs, and kidneys to be donated, but are unswerving in their prohibition of donating his eyes.

Once he gains consent from Marianne and Sean to donate Simon's organs, Thomas contacts the Biomedical Agency, where an evaluation of the organs is performed and recipients are matched to them. Almost immediately, Simon's liver is assigned to a six-year-old girl in Strasbourg, his lungs to a seventeen-year-old girl in Lyon, and his kidneys to a nine-year-old boy in Rouen. His heart takes slightly longer to find a match, but soon one is found: Claire Méjan, a 51-year-old woman suffering from myocarditis who, after three years of her condition gradually worsening, is in dire need of a heart transplant.

That night, the heart transplantation is performed successfully by Dr. Emmanuel Harfang, the head cardiac surgeon at Pitié-Salpêtrière Hospital in Paris. Exactly twenty-four hours after Simon first stepped out for his very last surfing session, Claire finally has a new heart, and Simon's restored body is returned to his family the following morning.

== Characters ==
- Simon Limbres is a 19-year-old boy who is declared brain-dead following a car accident after an early-morning surfing session. He is described as a passionate, adventurous, and carefree young man with a deep love for surfing. Because of his relatively young age and good health prior to his death, Simon is selected as an ideal candidate for organ donation. Ultimately, his heart, liver, lungs, and kidneys are donated.
- Marianne Limbres is Simon's mother. She is the first family member to be notified of Simon's injuries and admission to the hospital. Like her husband Sean, whom she is currently separated from, Marianne feels immensely guilty for failing to protect her son, but she later realizes that allowing him to live his bold lifestyle was the best thing she had done for him. Marianne later uses this epiphany to persuade Sean to allow Simon's organs to be donated.
- Sean Limbres is Simon's father. He is currently separated from Marianne due to the demanding nature of his job and the consequential strain it placed on their marriage. He angrily accuses Dr. Pierre Révol and the rest of the ICU staff for not doing enough to save his son, and is initially adamant against donating Simon's organs. Eventually, he is persuaded by Marianne to allow the hospital to carry out the donations. Along with his wife, Sean struggles to accept Simon's death. He also blames himself for introducing his son to surfing, which is what led to the fatal car accident that took his life.
- Lou Limbres is Simon's younger sister. She is 7 years old. Her name is whispered in Simon's ear by Thomas right before his operation, as requested by Marianne and Sean.
- Juliette is Simon's 18-year old girlfriend. She is resentful of Simon's passion for surfing, which she sees as an intrusion in their relationship.
- Christophe Alba and Johan Rocher are Simon's friends, with whom he went surfing on the day of his death. Both boys were also involved in the car accident, but they only suffered minor injuries.
- Claire Méjan is a 51-year-old woman and mother diagnosed with myocarditis who has been waiting for a heart transplant for three years. She is selected to receive Simon's heart after being placed on the Biomedical Agency's priority list of recipients due to her state of acute deterioration. While Claire is ecstatic about finally receiving a new heart, she is also afraid of the pain and the possibility of death from the operation, and of the loss of her identity.
- Thomas Rémige is a nurse and the head of the Coordinating Committee for Organ and Tissue Removal, an organization that arranges organ donations and transplants within the hospital. Prior to this position, he was a nurse in the intensive care unit. In The Heart, Thomas is assigned the arduous task of convincing Marianne and Sean to authorize the donation of their son's organs.
- Dr. Pierre Révol is the head physician of the intensive care unit department at the hospital. He oversees Simon's case and declares him officially brain-dead.
- Cordélia Owl is a new nurse in the intensive care unit who is assigned to Simon. Before being transferred to the ICU, Cordélia worked in the operating room. She is scolded by Dr. Révol for speaking to Simon as if he were a live patient in front of his parents who, according to Dr. Révol, may misinterpret her words as a sign that their son can still be saved when in reality, he cannot.
- Dr. Marthe Carrare is one of the founders of the Biomedical Agency, an organization located within the National Center for the Allocation of Transplants that conducts thorough evaluations of transplant organs and allocates them to various hospitals and patients. In The Heart, she is responsible for finding suitable recipients for Simon's heart, liver, kidneys, and lungs.
- Dr. Emmanuel Harfang is the head cardiac surgeon at Pitié-Salpêtrière Hospital who accepts Simon's heart from Dr. Carrare and performs Claire's transplantation. He hails from the so-called "Harfang Dynasty," a prominent and wealthy family consisting of generations of physicians.
- Virgilio Breva is a cardiac surgery intern at Pitié-Salpêtrière who assists Dr. Harfang in the heart transplantation.
- Alice Harfang is a new cardiac surgery intern at Pitié-Salpêtrière who joins Virgilio and Dr. Harfang in the transplantation. She is a descendant of the "Harfang Dynasty."
- Rose is Virgilio's unstable and possessive girlfriend who is resentful of him often being away for operations, and with whom Virgilio cannot bring himself to break up with.

== Themes ==
A central theme of The Heart is the acceptance of reality and death. Throughout the novel, Marianne and Sean struggle with the passing of their son Simon, a strong, healthy young man who lived his life fearlessly and immensely. Sean experiences a greater degree of difficulty coping with Simon's death, as demonstrated by his fury at the hospital for their insufficient efforts to save his son and by his initial and staunch refusal to authorize Simon's organs to be donated. Meanwhile, Marianne blames herself for not doing enough to protect Simon from his reckless lifestyle, but she eventually realizes that allowing him to lead his life the way he did was the best thing she and Sean could've done for him. Ultimately, Sean and Marianne allow Simon to be an organ donor, which is a milestone towards their gradual acceptance of his death and moving on.

The Heart also focuses on the psychology behind the refusal to donate a deceased loved one's organs, even with the knowledge that someone else's life can possibly be saved. Sean, who is the most resistant to donating Simon's organs, expresses his desire to preserve his son's body and is repulsed by the idea of it being cut up and destroyed during the operation. To the Limbres, Simon's body is not merely a large mass of skin, tissue, muscle, and bone; it is a tangible symbol for his life, for his existence on Earth, and for the impacts he made on the lives of those who loved him most. In essence, Simon's body serves as a memorial in dedication to his life, and ruining it would diminish his memory and legacy. Although Marianne and Sean eventually give their consent for Simon to be an organ donor, they refuse to donate his eyes, thus showcasing the symbolic differences between each organ.

== Background and development ==
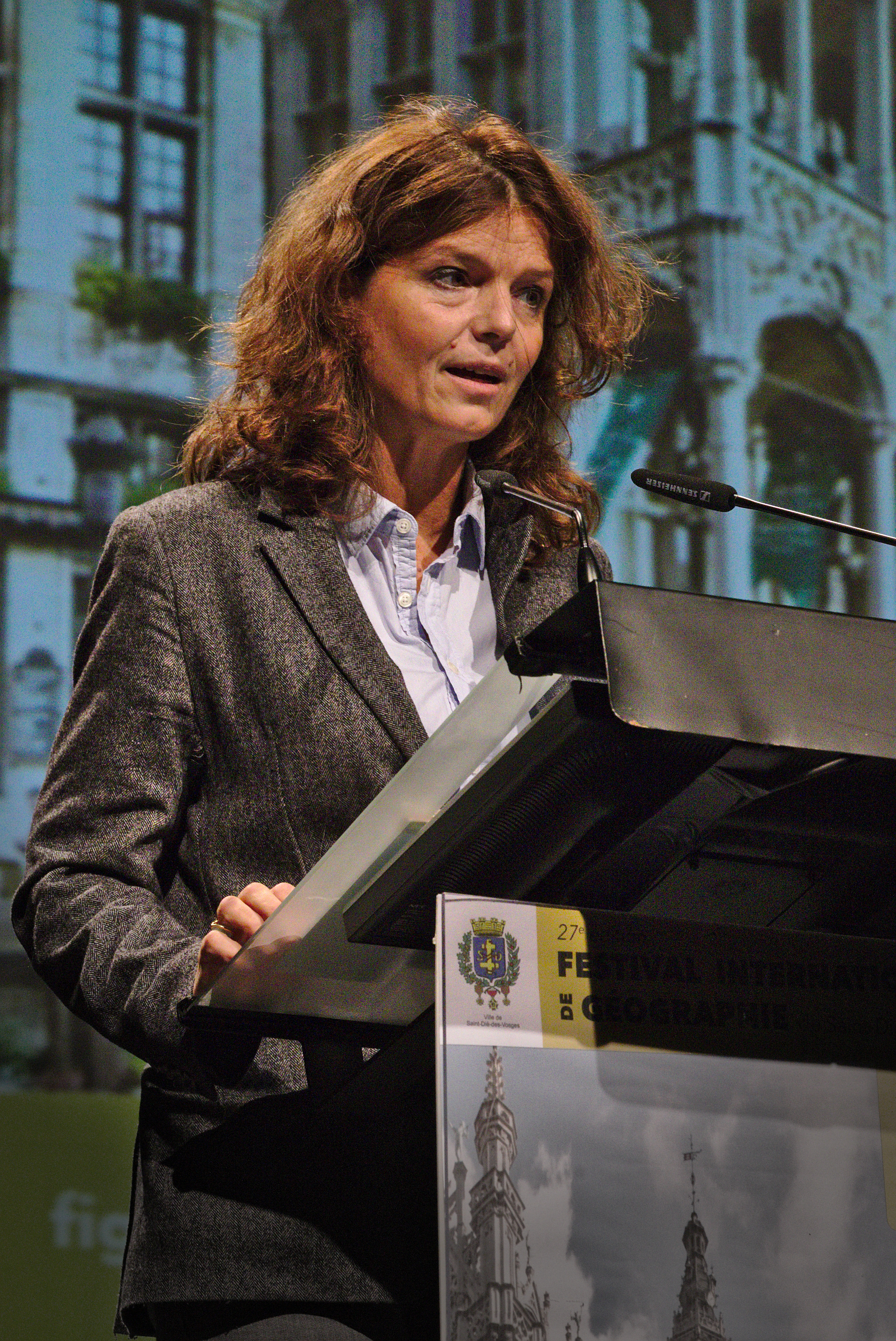
Maylis de Kerangal, author of The Heart, in 2016

In 2007, after watching a television report on heart transplantation, Maylis de Kerangal wrote a short piece titled Swimmer's Heart for Compatible Woman's Body for Who is Alive?, a compilation book commemorating the 10th anniversary of the French publisher Éditions Verticales. Over the next five years, de Kerangal experienced personal grief and revitalized her interest in heart transplantation, which inspired her to write about the heart not just as an essential organ in the human body like she did in Swimmer's Heart for Compatible Woman's Body, but as a source of love, emotion, and humanism. She subsequently began writing The Heart in July 2012. While developing and writing the novel, de Kerangal consulted with an organ transplant coordinating nurse at the Biomedicine Agency in Saint-Denis, France, who educated her on the legal aspects of organ transplantation and the process of obtaining consent from family members of the deceased. She then met with an emergency physician at the agency who introduced her to Cristal, a software that stores medical records, serves as a database of patients awaiting organ donations, matches donors with suitable recipients, and protects their identities. Finally, de Kerangal observed an organ transplant operation led by Dr. Pascal Leprince, the head of cardiothoracic surgery at Pitié-Salpêtrière Hospital.

== Critical reception ==
Upon its initial release in France in 2014, The Heart was widely lauded. French journalist and author Pierre Assouline referred to The Heart as "a novel of great beauty, a writing, a language dazzling" and as "fine and intelligent without ever pushing the collar." In his review, French journalist and television personality Bernard Pivot described The Heart as a "story driven with [the] surgical precision of a heart transplant" and called it "an extraordinary novel that now classifies Maylis de Kerangal among the major writers of the early twenty-first century." French cultural and television magazine Télérama gave The Heart a five-star rating and commended the continuous flow and musicality of de Kerangal's prose.

In the United States, The Heart received similar praise. In her review for The New York Times, Priya Parmar recounted the novel as a "...story [that] unfolds in an intricate lacework of precise detail" and described the characters as "less like fictional creations and more like ordinary people, briefly illuminated in rich language, beautifully translated by Sam Taylor, that veers from the medical to the philosophical." In her critique for the American edition of The Guardian, Lydia Kiesling emphasized on how The Heart embodied the importance of narratives to medicine and vice versa, and also commended de Kerangal as a "master of momentum" who "liberates medicine from the language that, by necessity, has constrained its practice." In an entry titled "A Poetic Novel About Grief" for his blog Gates Notes, Bill Gates described The Heart as "poetry disguised as a novel" that deftly formed a strong connection between readers and characters who appear only briefly in the novel, and that compelled him to "feel the depth of grief," which he identified as a fulfilling and insightful personal experience.

In a mixed review, Kirkus Reviews criticized The Heart for becoming "anticlimactic" in its second half after its crucial turning point and described it as "a sophisticated medical drama whose pulse-pounding strength diminishes a touch too quickly."

== Awards ==
Since its first publication in 2014, The Heart has received several accolades, including:

=== French ===
- 2014 Grand Prix RTL-Lire
- 2014 Prix Pierre-Espil
- 2014 Orange Book Award
- 2014 Charles Brisset Literary Award
- 2014 Lire Magazine Best French Novel Prize
- 2014 L'Express - BFMTV Reader's Prize
- 2014 Prix France Culture-Télérama - Student Choice Novel
- 2015 Relay Prize for Travelers

=== English ===
- 2017 Wellcome Book Prize

== Adaptations ==
In France, The Heart has been adapted by French actor Emmanuel Noblet into a one-man stage play named after the original French title of the novel, Réparer les vivants. It debuted at the 2015 Festival d'Avignon, an annual performing arts festival in Avignon. Since then, Réparer les vivants has been performed at the Théâtre du Rond-Point in Paris and the Théâtre du Nord in Lille, where it has been well received. Réparer les vivants was shown at the Théâtre du Petit Saint-Martin in Paris from December 12 to December 31, 2017, and at the Théâtre de Sartrouville in Sartrouville from February to March 2018.

An English-language musical adaptation, The Heart, premiered at La Jolla Playhouse on August 19, 2025, featuring music and lyrics by Anne and Ian Eisendrath and book and additional lyrics by Kait Kerrigan. The production was directed by Christopher Ashley and choreographed by Mandy Moore. The musical will have an Off-Broadway production in 2026, with previews starting October 8, 2026 at Roundabout Theatre Company's Laura Pels Theatre.

The Heart has also been adapted into a film, Heal the Living, directed by Katell Quillévéré and starring Emmanuelle Seigner as Marianne Limbres, Tahar Rahim as Thomas Rémige, Anne Dorval as Claire Méjan, and Gabin Verdet as Simon Limbres. It was released on November 1, 2016, in France and in the United States on April 14, 2017 to critical acclaim. Currently, Heal the Living holds a 90% rating on Rotten Tomatoes, an 82/100 on Metacritic, and four out of four on Roger Ebert.
