= The Heart (musical) =

2025 stage musical based on the 2014 novel

- Music: Ian Eisendrath; Anne Eisendrath
- Lyrics: Kait Kerrigan; Ian Eisendrath; Anne Eisendrath
- Book: Kait Kerrigan
- Basis: The Heart (2014); By: Maylis de Kerangal
- Productions: 2025 La Jolla Playhouse

The Heart is a musical with a book by Kait Kerrigan and music by Ian and Anne Eisendrath with additional lyrics by Kerrigan. The musical is based on the 2014 French language novel Mend the Living (Réparer les vivants) by Maylis de Kerangal.

The musical had its world premiere on August 19, 2025, at the La Jolla Playhouse and will transfer Off-Broadway in the fall of 2026 as part of the Roundabout Theatre Company season at the Laura Pels Theatre.

== Premise ==
The show follows the 24 hour journey of a heart transplant and the lives touched as it goes from one human to another. The music inside the show features EDM to represent the pulsating beating heart.

== Production history ==
=== New York Stage and Film (2024) ===
The show was workshopped in August 2024 at New York Stage and Film.

=== La Jolla (2025) ===
The show had its world premiere at the La Jolla Playhouse beginning August 19, 2025 where it received critical acclaim and extended its run from September 23 until the show closed October 5, 2025. The show was directed by Christopher Ashley and choreographed by Mandy Moore.

=== Off-Broadway (2026) ===
The musical was announced to transfer Off-Broadway as part of Roundabout Theatre Company's 2026–2027 season at the Laura Pels Theatre, again directed by Ashley.

== Original cast and characters ==
Character	Workshop (2024)	La Jolla (2025)	Off Broadway (2026)
Claire Major and others	Heidi Blickenstaff	Heidi Blickenstaff	Heidi Blickenstaff
Thomas Driscoll and others	Jay Armstrong Johnson	Lincoln Clauss	Lincoln Clauss
Cordelia Owl and others	Taylor Iman Jones	Bre Jackson	Bre Jackson
Juliette Brooks and others	Gizel Jiménez	Max McKenna	Max McKenna
Marianne Lamar and others	Lisa Brescia	Kenita R. Miller	Joaquina Kalukango
Dr. Breva and others	Drew Gehling	Paul Alexander Nolan	Drew Gehling
Simon Lamar and others	Zachary Noah Piser	Zachary Noah Piser	Nick T. Daly
Marthe Carrera and others	Wren Rivera	Wren Rivera	Wren Rivera
Sean Lamar and others	Miguel Cervantes	Jason Tam	Jason Tam

== Musical numbers ==
- "Simon Lamar's Heart"
- "Keep Up"
- "I Will Never Let You Go"
- "Il Cardellino"
- "Quicksand"
- "Gone in the Morning"
- "Right Now"
- "Dawn Patrol"
- "Strike the Match"
- "Nobody Gets Out Alive"
- "A Life for a Life"
- "Drift Away"
- "I Will Never Let You Go (Reprise)"
- "Too Young"
- "Keep Up (Remix)"
- "Love, Where Does It Go?"
- "Marianne's Dream"
- "Mend The Living"
