= Eastbound =

2012 book by Maylis De Kerangal

- Author: Maylis de Kerangal
- Translator: Jessica Moore
- Publisher: Archipelago Books
- Publication date: 2023
- Publication place: France
- Pages: 137
- ISBN: 1953861504

Eastbound (originally released in 2012 as Tangente vers l'est) is a book by French author Maylis de Kerangal, published in translation in 2023 by Archipelago Books. The novel was named one of the best books of 2023 by The New York Times and The New Yorker.

== Synopsis ==
The novel tells the story of Aliocha, a 20 year old Russian conscript who is attempting desertion from the army as he travels on a trans-Siberian train heading east. On board the train he meets Helene, a passenger in first class. Helene is a 35 year old French woman who is leaving her Russian lover. Helene does not speak Russian and the two communicate with hand gestures and other non-verbal cues. Helene assists Aliocha in evading capture from his Sergeant as he attempts to flee.

== Reception ==
Writing in the New York Times, author Ken Kalfus believed that the book's setting, on board a speeding train in the vastness of Siberia, complemented the characters' relationship elegantly. Halfus stated: "Siberia’s immensity dwarfs human perspective. The insecurity of existence across this vastness and on board the train emphasizes the significance of human connection. In a time of war, this connection may bring liberation and salvation." Writing for The New Yorker, Lauren Oyler stated that de Kerangal vividly portrayed urgency and the fleeting passage of time as the protagonists try to escape, stating: "It takes immense skill, patience, and clarity to paint time, to render the melee of past and present, symbolic and real. Language may not be what allows us to see it, but in the right hands we can get close." Writing for The Wall Street Journal, Sam Sacks stated: "Eastbound briskly unfolds the events of this crazy but thrilling little Mission: Impossible, allowing itself speedy diversions into the backgrounds of both Aliocha and his accomplice", while further stating: "The crisp cascading sentences; the delicious mixture of fear and romance; the harmonious balance of story and language: these are characteristics of each of Ms. de Kerangal's books."
