= Trans-Siberian Railway =

Railway network spanning Russia

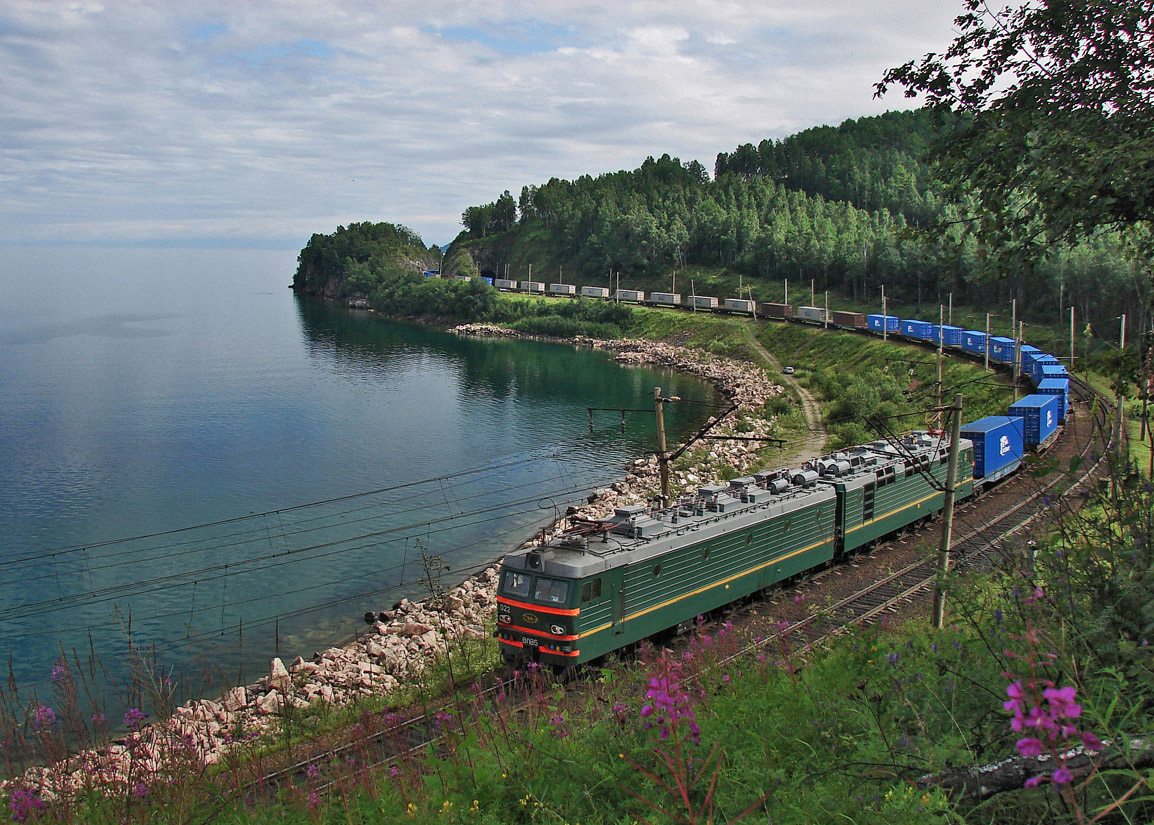
- VL85 container haul along the coast of Lake Baikal (2008)

Overview
- Native name: Транссибирская магистраль (Russian)
- Owner: Government of Russia
- Locale: Russia
- Termini: Moscow Yaroslavsky; Vladivostok

Service
- Type: Transcontinental railroad; Regional rail; Commuter rail; Freight rail
- System: FER; SZhD; V-SibZhD; Z-SibZhD; KrasZhD; SvZhD; ZabZhD
- Operator: Russian Railways

History
- Work began: March 9, 1891; 135 years ago
- Opened: June 21, 1904; 122 years ago

Technical
- Line length: 9,289 km (5,772 mi)
- Num of tracks: 3
- Character: Long-haul route
- Track gauge: 1,520 mm (4 ft 11 27/32 in) Russian gauge
- Electrification: 3 kV DC/25 kV 50 Hz AC overhead line
- Operating speed: 60–140 km/h (37–87 mph)

The Trans-Siberian Railway, (Note: Russian: Транссибирская магистраль, romanized: Transsibírskaya magistrál, pronounced [trənsːʲɪˈbʲirskəjə məɡʲɪˈstralʲ]) historically known as the Great Siberian Route (Note: Великий Сибирский Путь, Velíkiy Sibírskiy Put, pronounced [vʲɪˈlʲikʲɪj sʲɪˈbʲirʲsʲkʲɪj putʲ]) and often shortened to Transsib, (Note: /ˈtrænsɪb/ TRAN-sib; Транссиб, pronounced [trɐnˈsːʲip]) is a large railway system that connects European Russia to the Russian Far East. Spanning a length of over 9,289 kilometers (5,772 miles), it is the longest railway line in the world. It runs from the city of Moscow in the west to the city of Vladivostok in the east.

During the period of the Russian Empire, government ministers—personally appointed by Alexander III and his son Nicholas II—supervised the building of the railway network between 1891 and 1916. Even before its completion, the line attracted travelers who documented their experiences. Since 1916, the Trans-Siberian Railway has directly connected Moscow with Vladivostok. As of 2021, expansion projects remained underway, with connections being built to Russia's neighbors Mongolia, China, and North Korea. Additionally, there have been proposals and talks to expand the network to Tokyo, Japan, with new bridges or tunnels that would connect the mainland railway via the Russian island of Sakhalin and the Japanese island of Hokkaido.

== Route ==
Trans-Siberian line in red; Baikal–Amur Mainline in green; Amur–Yakutsk Mainline in orange

The railway is often associated with the main transcontinental Russian line that connects many large and small cities of the European and Asian parts of Russia. At a Moscow–Vladivostok track length of 9,289 kilometers (5,772 miles), it spans a record eight time zones. Taking eight days to complete the journey, it was the third-longest single continuous service in the world, after the Moscow–Pyongyang service 10,267 kilometers (6,380 mi) and the former Kyiv–Vladivostok service 11,085 kilometers (6,888 mi), both of which also follow the Trans-Siberian for much of their routes.

The main route begins in Moscow at Yaroslavsky Vokzal, runs through Yaroslavl or Chelyabinsk, Omsk, Novosibirsk, Krasnoyarsk, Irkutsk, Ulan-Ude, Chita, and Khabarovsk to Vladivostok via southern Siberia. A second primary route is the Trans-Manchurian, which coincides with the Trans-Siberian east of Chita as far as Tarskaya (a stop 12 km (7 mi) east of Karymskoye, in Chita Oblast), about 1,000 km (621 mi) east of Lake Baikal. From Tarskaya the Trans-Manchurian heads southeast, via Harbin–Manzhouli railway and Harbin–Suifenhe railway in China's Northeastern provinces (from where a connection to Beijing is used by one of the Moscow–Beijing trains), joining the main route in Ussuriysk just north of Vladivostok.

The third primary route is the Trans-Mongolian Railway, which coincides with the Trans-Siberian as far as Ulan-Ude on Lake Baikal's eastern shore. From Ulan-Ude the Trans-Mongolian heads south to Ulaanbaatar before making its way southeast to Beijing. In 1991, a fourth route running further to the north was finally completed, after more than five decades of sporadic work. Known as the Baikal–Amur Mainline (BAM), this recent extension departs from the Trans-Siberian line at Taishet several hundred miles west of Lake Baikal and passes the lake at its northernmost extremity. It crosses the Amur River at Komsomolsk-na-Amure (north of Khabarovsk), and reaches the Tatar Strait at Sovetskaya Gavan.

== History ==
=== Demand and design ===
In the late 19th century, the development of Siberia was hampered by poor transport links within the region and with the rest of the country. Aside from the Great Siberian Route, roads suitable for wheeled transport were rare. For about five months of the year, rivers were the main means of transport. During winter, cargo and passengers traveled by horse-drawn sledges over the winter roads, many of which were the same rivers but frozen.

The first steamboat on the River Ob, Nikita Myasnikov's Osnova, was launched in 1844. However, early innovation had proven to be difficult, and it was not until 1857 that steamboat shipping had begun major development on the Ob system. Steamboats began operation on the Yenisei in 1863, and on the Lena and Amur in the 1870s. While the comparative flatness of Western Siberia was served by good river systems, the major river systems Ob–Irtysh–Tobol–Chulym of Eastern Siberia had difficulties. The Yenisei, the upper course of the Angara River below Bratsk which was not easily navigable because of the rapids, and the Lena, were mostly navigable only in the north–south direction, making west–east transportation difficult. An attempt to partially remedy the situation by building the Ob–Yenisei Canal had not yielded great success. These issues in the region created the need for a railway to be constructed.

The first railway projects in Siberia emerged after the completion of the Saint Petersburg–Moscow Railway in 1851. One of the first was the Irkutsk–Chita project, proposed by the American entrepreneur Perry Collins and supported by Transport Minister Constantine Possiet with a view toward connecting Moscow to the Amur River, and consequently the Pacific Ocean. Siberia's governor, Nikolay Muravyov-Amursky, was anxious to advance Russian colonization of the now Russian Far East, but his plans were unfeasible due to colonists importing grain and food from China and Korea. It was on Muravyov's initiative that surveys for a railway in the Khabarovsk region were conducted.

Before 1880, the central government had virtually ignored these projects, due to weaknesses in Siberian enterprises, an inefficient bureaucracy, and financial risk. By 1880, there was a large number of rejected and upcoming applications for permission to construct railways in order to connect Siberia with the Pacific, but not Eastern Russia. This worried the government and made connecting Siberia with Central Russia a pressing concern. The design process lasted 10 years. Along with the actual route constructed, alternative projects were proposed:

- Southern route: via Kazakhstan, Barnaul, Abakan and Mongolia.
- Northern route: via Tyumen, Tobolsk, Tomsk, Yeniseysk and the modern Baikal Amur Mainline or even through Yakutsk.

The line was divided into seven sections, most or all of which was simultaneously worked on by 62,000 workers. With financial support provided by leading European financier, Baron Henri Hottinguer of the Parisian bankers Hottinger & Cie, the total cost estimated at £35 million was raised with the first section (Chelyabinsk to the River Ob) and finished at a cost £900,000 lower than anticipated. Railwaymen argued against suggestions to save funds, such as installing ferryboats instead of bridges over the rivers until traffic increased.

Unlike the rejected private projects that intended to connect the existing cities that required transport, the Trans-Siberian did not have such a priority. Thus, to save money and avoid clashes with land owners, it was decided to lay the railway outside the existing cities. However, due to the swampy banks of the Ob River near Tomsk (the largest settlement at the time), the idea to construct a bridge was rejected.

The railway was laid 70 km (43 mi) to the south (instead crossing the Ob at Novonikolaevsk, later renamed Novosibirsk); a dead-end branch line connected with Tomsk, depriving the city of the prospective transit railway traffic and trade.

=== Construction ===
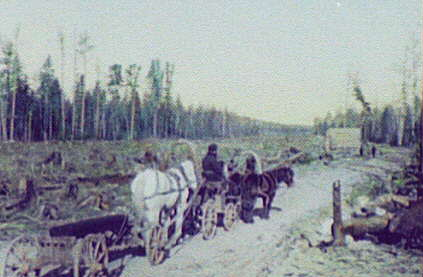
Clearing on the right-of-way of the Eastern Siberian Railway, 1895

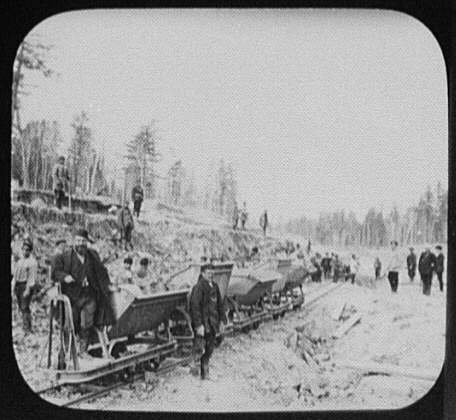
Construction work being performed by convicts on the Eastern Siberian Railway near Khabarovsk, 1895

On 9 March 1891, the Russian government issued an imperial rescript in which it announced its intention to construct a railway across Siberia. Tsarevich Nicholas (later Tsar Nicholas II) inaugurated the construction of the railway in Vladivostok on 19 May that year.

Lake Baikal is more than 640 kilometers (400 miles) long and more than 1,600 meters (5,200 feet) deep. Until the Circum–Baikal railway was built the line ended on either side of the lake, the ice-breaking train ferry SS Baikal built in 1897 and smaller ferry SS Angara built in about 1900 made the four-hour crossing to link the two railheads.

The Russian admiral and explorer Stepan Makarov (1849–1904) designed Baikal and Angara but they were built in Newcastle upon Tyne, by Armstrong Whitworth. They were "knock down" vessels; that is, each ship was bolted together in the United Kingdom, every part of the ship was marked with a number, the ship was disassembled into many hundreds of parts and transported in kit form to Listvyanka where a shipyard was built especially to reassemble them. Their boilers, engines and some other components were built in Saint Petersburg and transported to Listvyanka to be installed. Baikal had 15 boilers, four funnels, and was 64 meters (210 ft) long. it could carry 24 railway coaches and one locomotive on the middle deck. Angara was smaller, with two funnels.

Completion of the Circum-Baikal Railway in 1904 bypassed the ferries, but from time to time the Circum–Baikal railway suffered from derailments or rockfalls so both ships were held in reserve until 1916. Baikal was burnt out and destroyed in the Russian Civil War but Angara survives. It has been restored and is permanently moored at Irkutsk where it serves as an office and a museum.

In winter, sleighs were used to move passengers and cargo from one side of the lake to the other until the completion of the Lake Baikal spur along the southern edge of the lake. With the Amur River Line north of the Chinese border being completed in 1916, there was a continuous railway from Petrograd to Vladivostok that, to this day, is the world's second longest railway line. Electrification of the line, begun in 1929 and completed in 2002, allowed a doubling of train weights to 6,000 metric tons (5,900 long tons; 6,600 short tons). There were expectations upon electrification that it would increase rail traffic on the line by 40 percent.

The entire length of the Trans-Siberian Railway was double tracked by 1939.

=== Effects ===
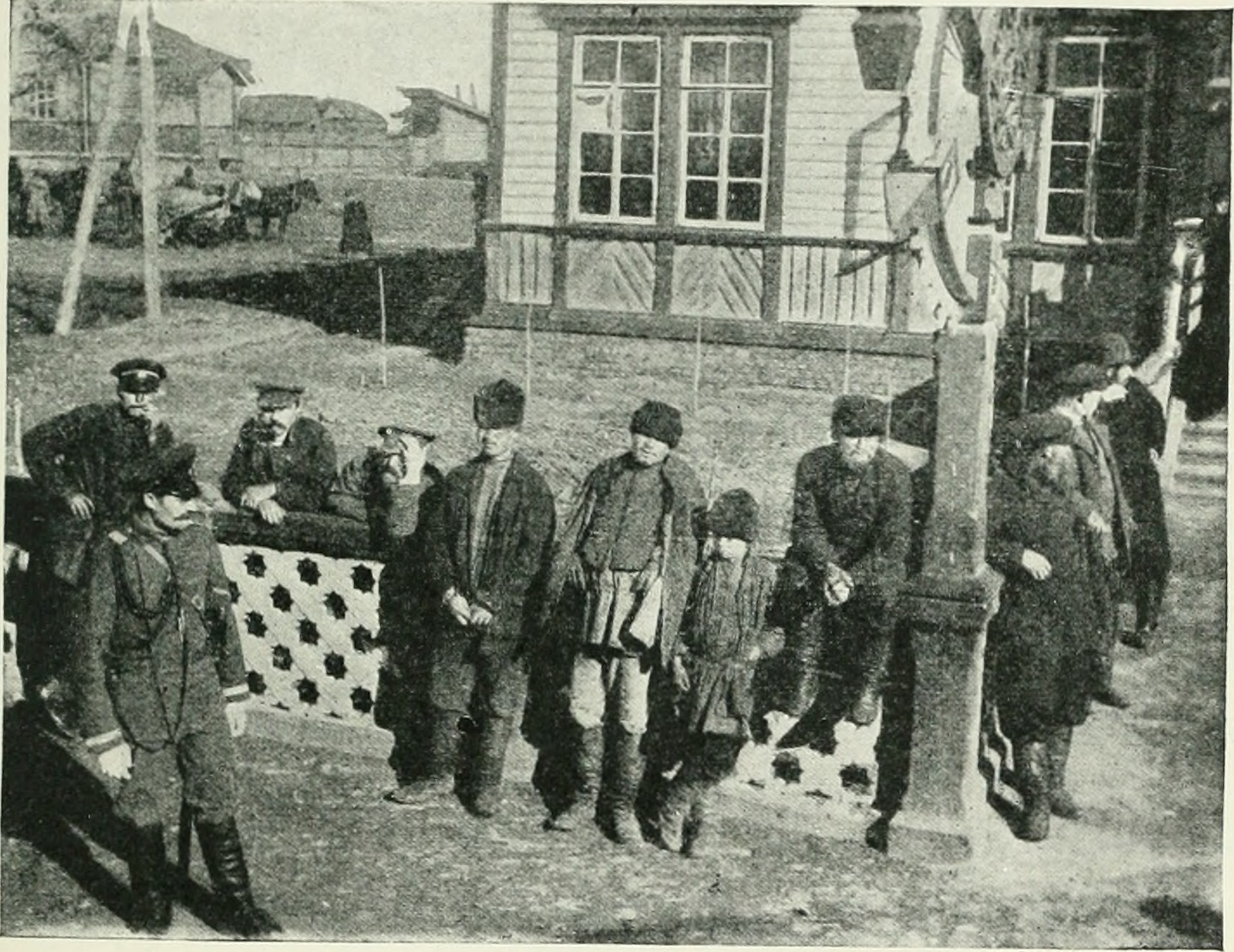
Siberian peasants watching a train at a station, 1902

Siberian agriculture began to send cheap grain westwards beginning around 1869. Agriculture in Central Russia was still under economic pressure after the end of serfdom, which was formally abolished in 1861. To defend the central territory and prevent possible social destabilization, the Tsarist government introduced the Chelyabinsk tariff-break (Челябинский тарифный перелом) in 1896, a tariff barrier for grain passing through Chelyabinsk, and a similar barrier in Manchuria. This measure changed the nature of export: mills emerged to produce bread from grain in Altai Krai, Novosibirsk and Tomsk, and many farms switched to corn (maize) production.

The railway immediately filled to capacity with local traffic, mostly wheat. From 1896 until 1913 Siberia exported on average 501,932 metric tons (494,005 long tons; 553,285 short tons) (30,643,000 pood) of grain and flour annually. During the Russo-Japanese War of 1904–1905, military traffic to the east disrupted the flow of civil freight.

The Trans-Siberian Railway brought with it millions of peasant-migrants from the Western regions of Russia and Ukraine. Between 1906 and 1914, the peak migration years, about four million peasants arrived in Siberia.

Historian Christian Wolmar argues that the railroad was a failure, because it was built for narrow political reasons, with poor supervision and planning. The costs were vastly exaggerated to enrich greedy bureaucrats. The planners hoped it would stimulate settlement, but the Siberian lands were too infertile and cold and distant. There was little settlement beyond 30 miles (48 km) from the line. The fragile system could not handle the heavy traffic demanded in wartime, so the Japanese in 1904 knew they were safe in their war with Russia. Wolmar concludes:

The railway, which was single track throughout, with the occasional passing loop, had, unsurprisingly, been built to a deficient standard in virtually every way. The permanent way was flimsy, with lightweight rails that broke easily, insufficient ballast, and railroad ties often carved from green wood that rotted in the first year of use. The small bridges were made of soft pine and rotted easily. The embankments were too shallow and narrow, often just 10 feet (3.0 m) wide instead of the 16 feet (4.9 m) prescribed in the design, and easily washed away. There were vicious gradients and narrow curves that wore out the fringe flanges on the wheels of the rolling stock after as little as six weeks use.

However, some historians argue that the Manchurian section of the Trans-Siberian network, the Chinese Eastern Railway, was both commercially and politically significant, stimulating trade and economic development across the region. Its annual freight traffic grew roughly sixfold between the early 1900s and early 1920s. Furthermore, the concession, the agreement under which Russia built and administered the railroad, gave it extraterritorial control in part of Manchuria until the 1920s, extending Russian and later Soviet imperial and political influence in the region.

=== War and revolution ===
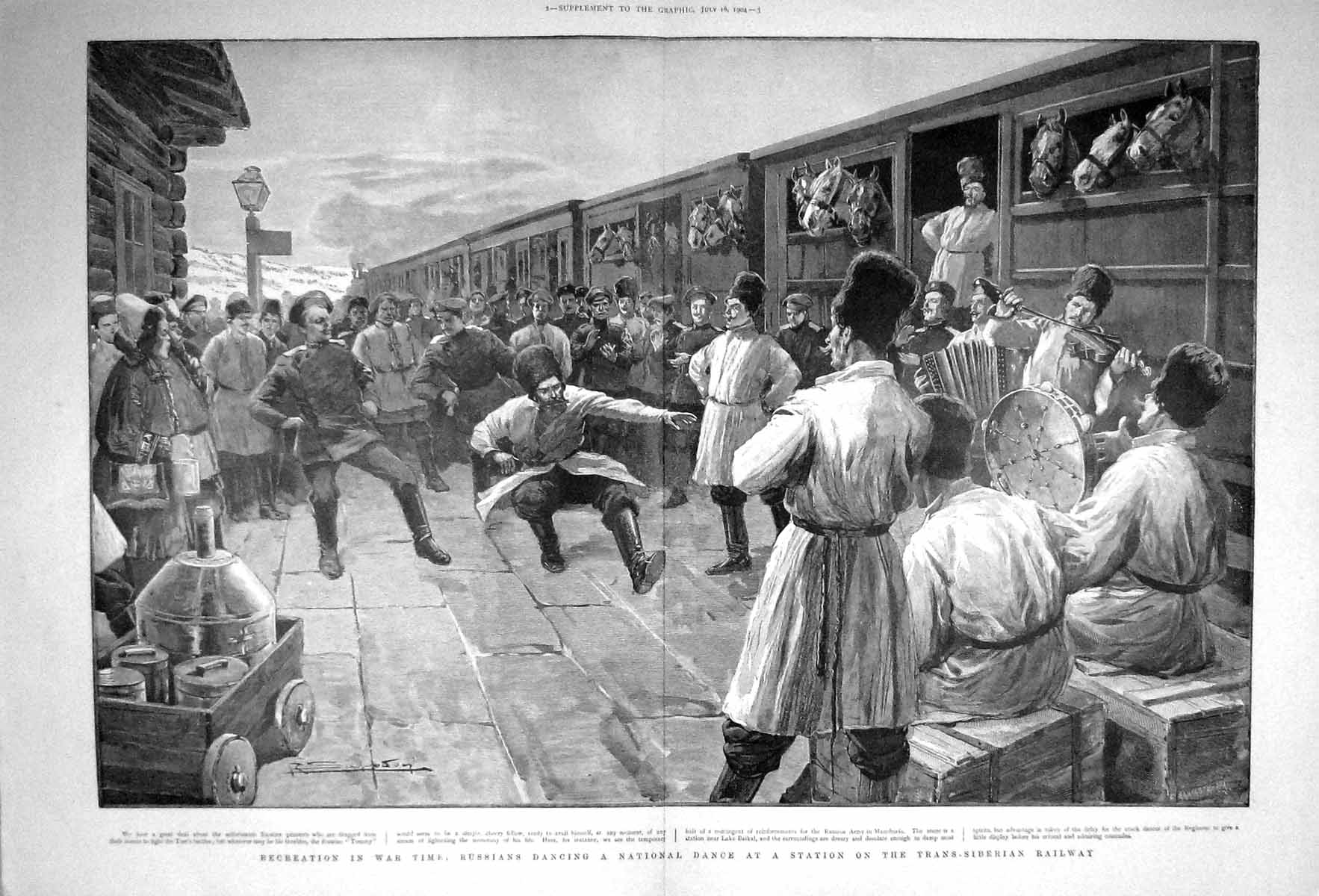
Trans-Siberian Railway, c. 1904

In the Russo-Japanese War (1904–1905), the strategic importance and limitations of the Trans-Siberian Railway contributed to Russia's defeat in the war. As the line was single-track, transit was slower as trains had to wait in crossing sidings for opposing trains to cross. This limited the capacity of the line and increased transit times. A troop train or a train carrying injured personnel traveling from east to west would delay the arrival of troops or supplies and ammunition in a train traveling from west to east. The supply difficulties meant the Russian forces had limited troops and supplies while Japanese forces with shorter lines of communication were able to attack and advance.

After the Russian Revolution of 1917, the railway served as the vital line of communication for the Czechoslovak Legion and the allied armies that landed troops at Vladivostok during the Siberian Intervention of the Russian Civil War. These forces supported the White Russian government of Admiral Alexander Kolchak, based in Omsk, and White Russian soldiers fighting the Bolsheviks on the Ural front. The intervention was weakened, and ultimately defeated, by partisan fighters who blew up bridges and sections of track, particularly in the volatile region between Krasnoyarsk and Chita.

The leader of legions politician Milan Rastislav Stefanik traveled from Moscow to Vladivostok in March to August 1918, on his journey to Japan and the United States of America. The Trans-Siberian Railway also played a very direct role during parts of Russia's history, with the Czechoslovak Legion using heavily armed and armored trains to control large amounts of the railway (and of Russia itself) during the Russian Civil War at the end of World War I. As one of the few fighting forces left in the aftermath of the imperial collapse, and before the Red Army took control, the Czechoslovak Legions were able to use their organization and the resources of the railway to establish a temporary zone of control before eventually continuing onwards towards Vladivostok, from where they emigrated back to Czechoslovakia.

=== World War II ===
During World War II, the Trans-Siberian Railway played an important role in the supply of the powers fighting in Europe. In 1939–1941 it was a source of rubber for Germany thanks to the USSR-Germany pact. While Germany's merchant shipping was shut down, the Trans-Siberian Railway (along with its Trans-Manchurian branch) served as the essential link between Germany and Japan, especially for rubber. By March 1941, 300 metric tons (300 long tons; 330 short tons) of this material would, on average, traverse the Trans-Siberian Railway every day on its way to Germany.

At the same time, a number of Jews and anti-Nazis used the Trans-Siberian Railway to escape Europe, including the mathematician Kurt Gödel and Betty Ehrlich Löwenstein, mother of British actor, director and producer Heinz Bernard. Several thousand Jewish refugees were able to make this trip thanks to the Curaçao visas issued by the Dutch consul Jan Zwartendijk and the Japanese visas issued by the Japanese consul, Chiune Sugihara, in Kaunas, Lithuania. Typically, they took the TSR to Vladivostok, then by ship to US. Until June 1941, pro-Nazi ethnic Germans from the Americas used the TSR to go to Germany.

The situation reversed after 22 June 1941. By invading the Soviet Union, Germany cut off its only reliable trade route to Japan. Instead, it had to use fast merchant ships and later large oceanic submarines to evade the Allied blockade. On the other hand, the USSR received Lend-Lease supplies from the US. Even after Japan went to war with the US, despite German complaints, Japan usually allowed Soviet ships to sail between the US and Vladivostok unmolested. As a result, the Pacific Route – via northern Pacific Ocean and the TSR – became the safest connection between the US and the USSR.

Accordingly, it accounted for as much freight as the North Atlantic–Arctic and Iranian routes combined, though cargoes were limited to raw materials and non-military goods. From 1941 to 1942 the TSR also played an important role in relocating Soviet industries from European Russia to Siberia in the face of the German invasion. The TSR also transported Soviet troops west from the Far East to take part in the Soviet counter-offensive in December 1941.

In 1944–45 the TSR was used to prepare for the Soviet–Japanese War of August 1945; see Pacific Route. When an Anglo-American delegation visited Moscow in October 1944 to discuss the Soviet Union joining the war against Japan, Alanbrooke was told by General Antonov and Stalin himself that the line capacity was 36 pairs of trains per day, but only 26 could be counted on for military traffic; see Pacific Route. The capacity of each train was from 600 to 700 tons.

Although the Japanese estimated that an attack was not likely before Spring 1946, Stavka had planned for a mid-August 1945 offensive, and had concealed the buildup of a force of 90 divisions; many had crossed Siberia in their vehicles to avoid straining the rail link.

=== Post World War II ===
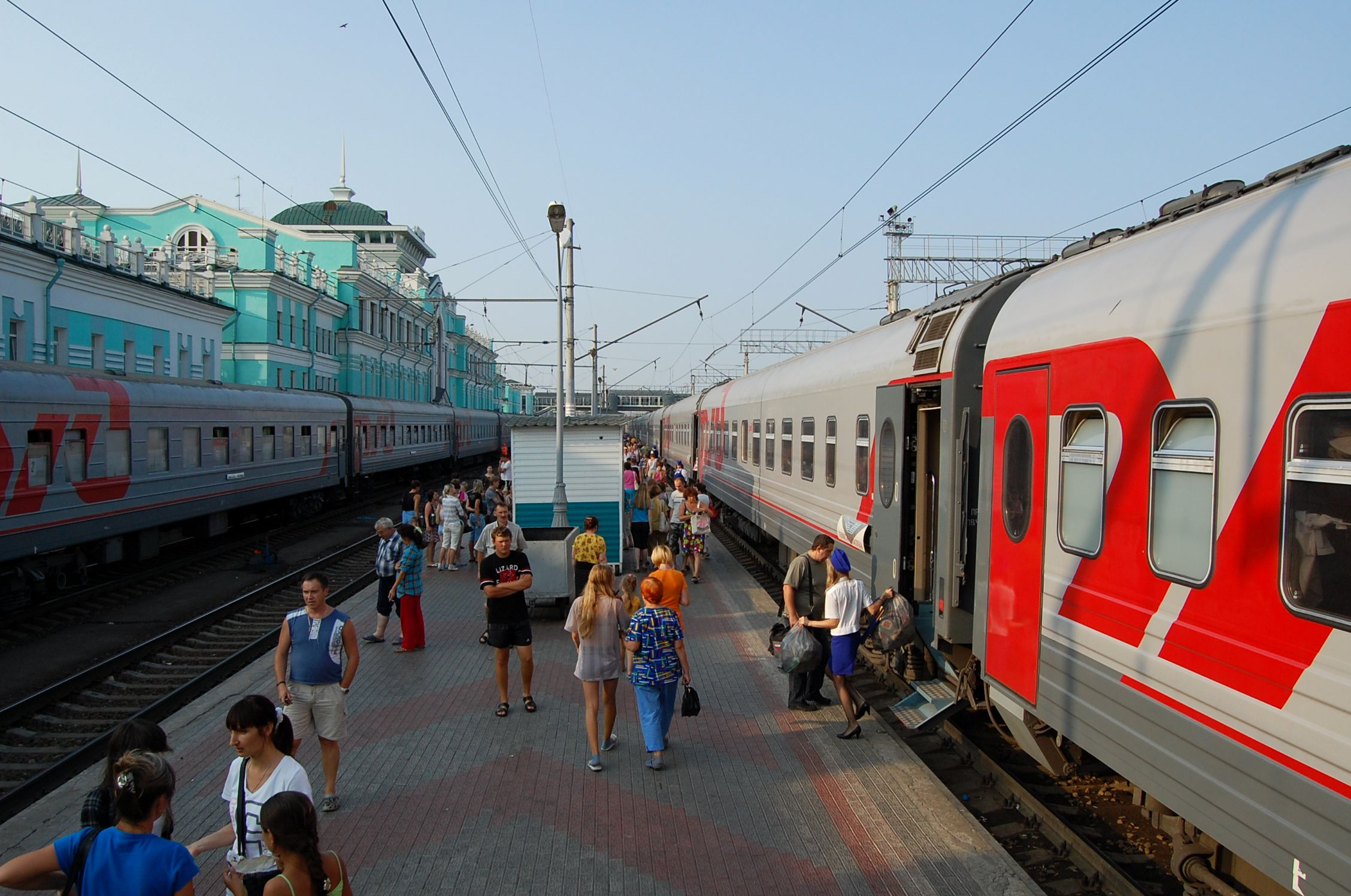
The Trans-Siberian is a vital link to the Russian Far East.

During the 1969 Sino-Soviet border conflict, the Soviet government saw the Trans-Siberian Railway's proximity to the China-Russia border as a vulnerability during wartime.

A trainload of containers can be taken from Beijing to Hamburg, via the Trans-Mongolian and Trans-Siberian lines in as little as 15 days, but typical cargo transit times are usually significantly longer and typical cargo transit time from Japan to major destinations in European Russia was reported as around 25 days.

According to a 2009 report, the best travel times for cargo block trains from Russia's Pacific ports to the western border (of Russia, or perhaps of Belarus) were around 12 days, with trains making around 900 km (600 mi) per day, at a maximum operating speed of 80 km/h (50 mph). In early 2009; however, Russian Railways announced an ambitious "Trans-Siberian in Seven Days" plan. According to this plan, $11 billion will be invested over the next five years to make it possible for goods traffic to cover the same 9,000 km (6,000 mi) distance in just seven days. The plan will involve increasing the cargo trains' speed to 90 km/h (60 mph) in 2010–2012, and, at least on some sections, to 100 km/h (60 mph) by 2015. At these speeds, goods trains will be able to cover 1,500 km (900 mi) per day.

==== Crime ====
From February to May 1993, a number of Beijing-based gangs routinely robbed, beat, and raped railway passengers. The criminals took advantage of the fact that Chinese police disembarked the train before the border crossing into Mongolia, but no Mongolian police ever boarded to replace them, and Russian authorities did not board until the train had been in Siberia for an entire day. During the interim, there was no effective security on the trains, and no practical resistance to criminals armed with knives, sticks, and cattle prods.

=== Developments in shipping ===
On January 11, 2008, China, Mongolia, Russia, Belarus, Poland, and Germany agreed to collaborate on a cargo train service between Beijing and Hamburg.

The railway can typically deliver containers in 1/3 to 1/2 of the time of a sea voyage, and in late 2009 announced a 20% reduction in its container shipping rates. With its 2009 rate schedule, the Trans-Siberian Railway will transport a forty-foot container to Poland from Yokohama for $2,820, or from Busan for $2,154.

== Gallery ==
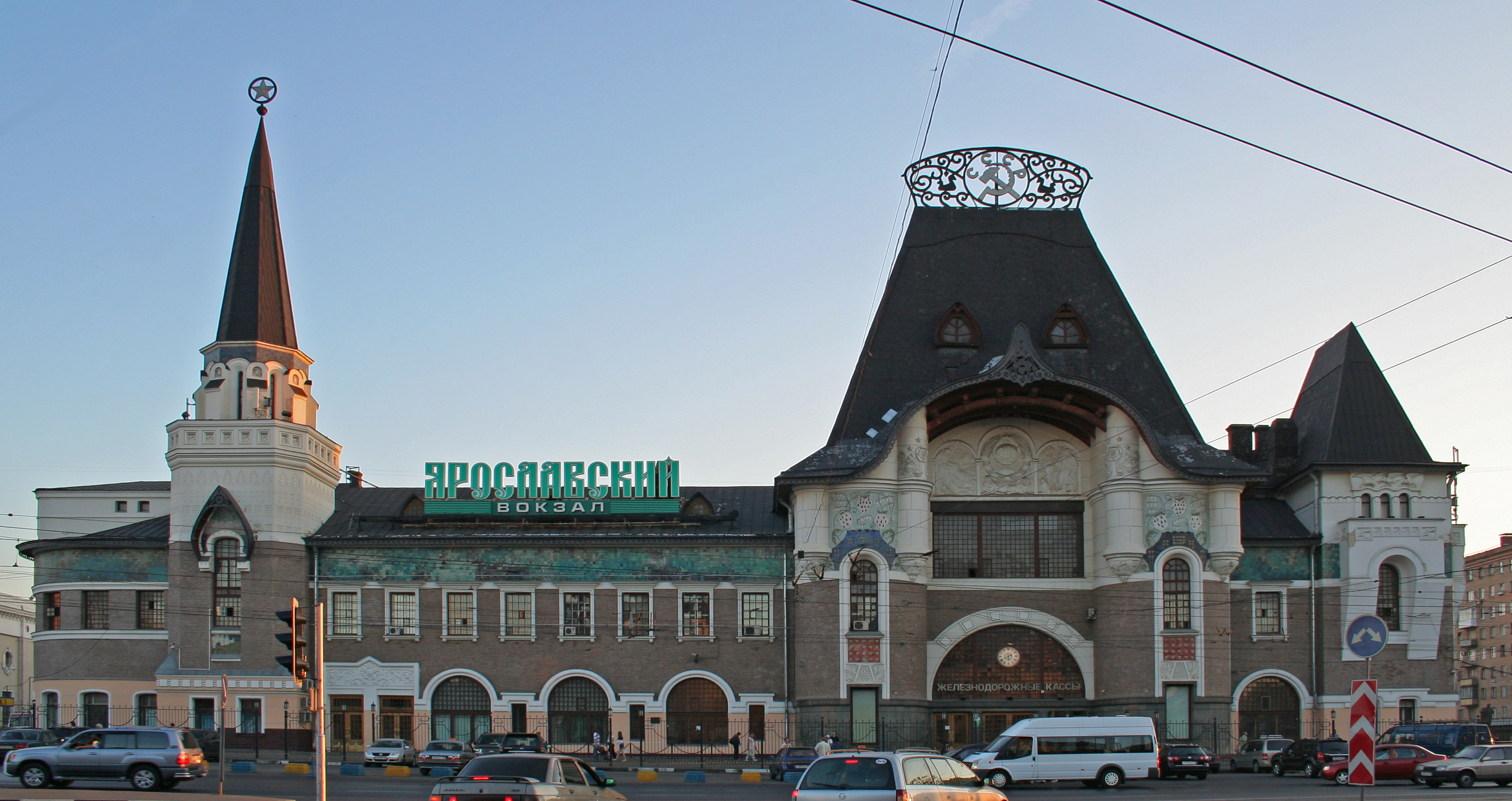
Start of the Trans-Siberian railway in Moscow

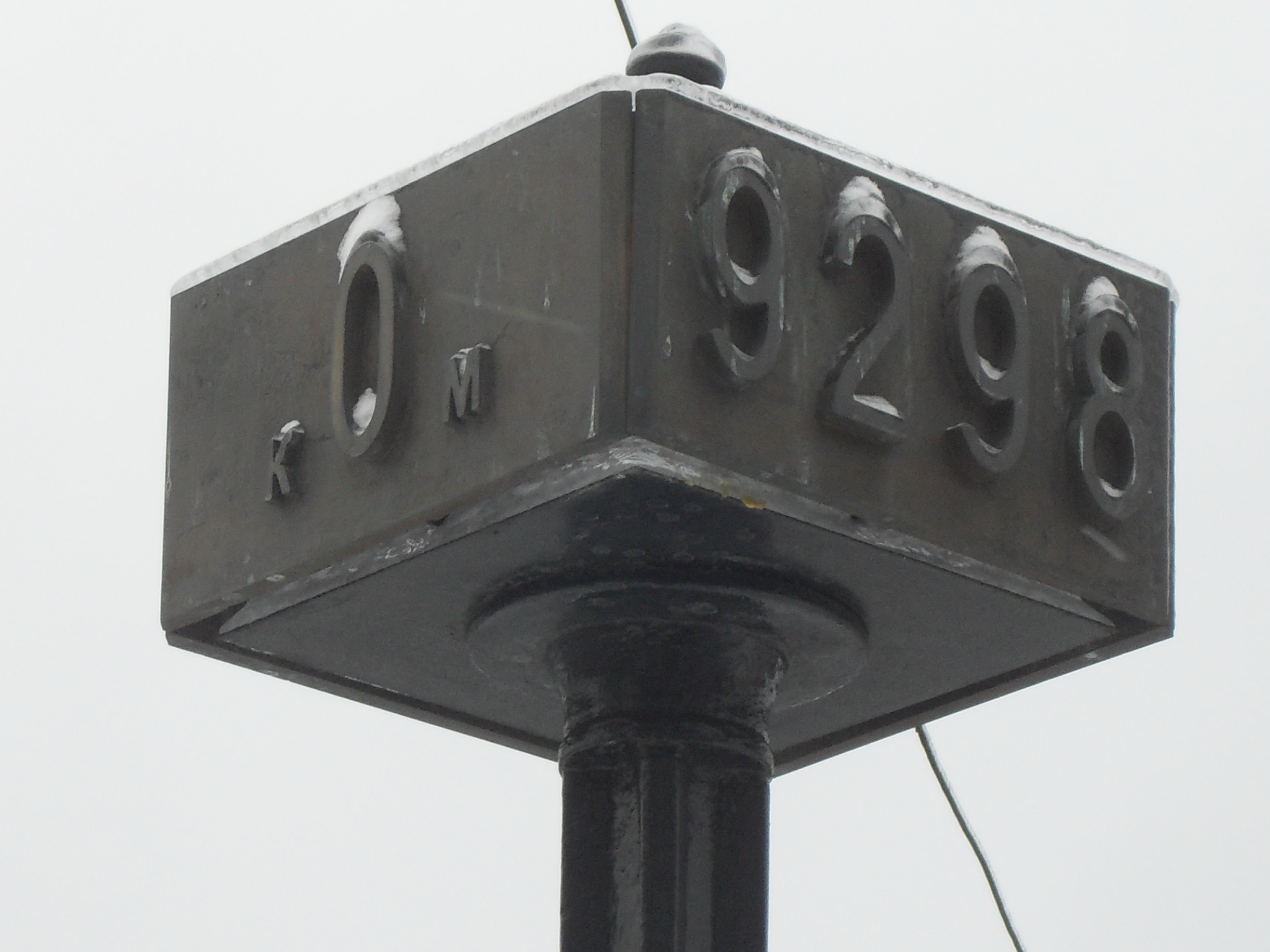
The "Zero Kilometer" kilometer marker at Yaroslavsky Station in Moscow indicates the length of the Trans-Siberian Railway—the distance from Moscow to Vladivostok.

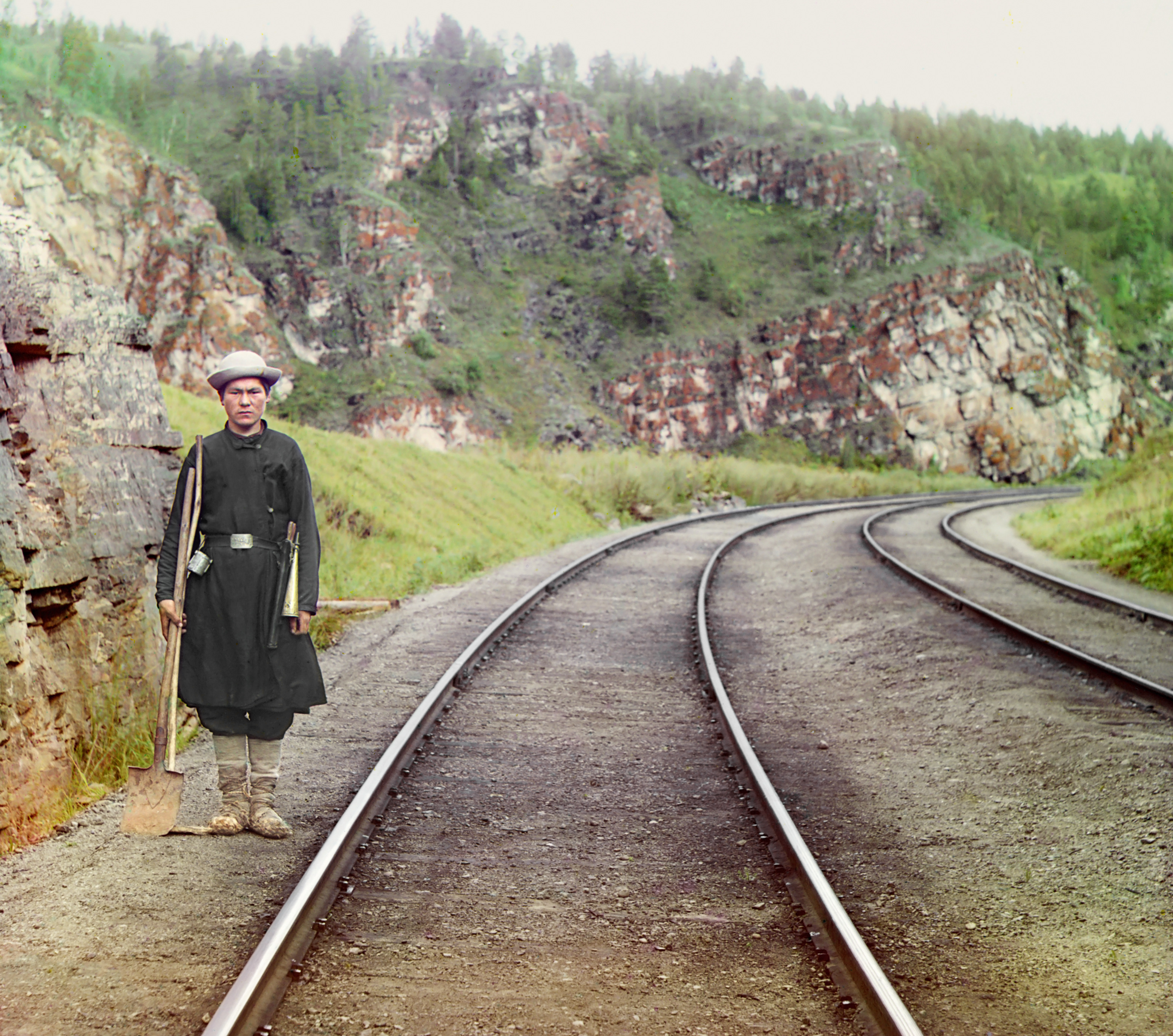
Bashkir switchman near the town Ust' Katav on the Yuryuzan River between Ufa and Chelyabinsk in the Ural Mountains region, c. 1910

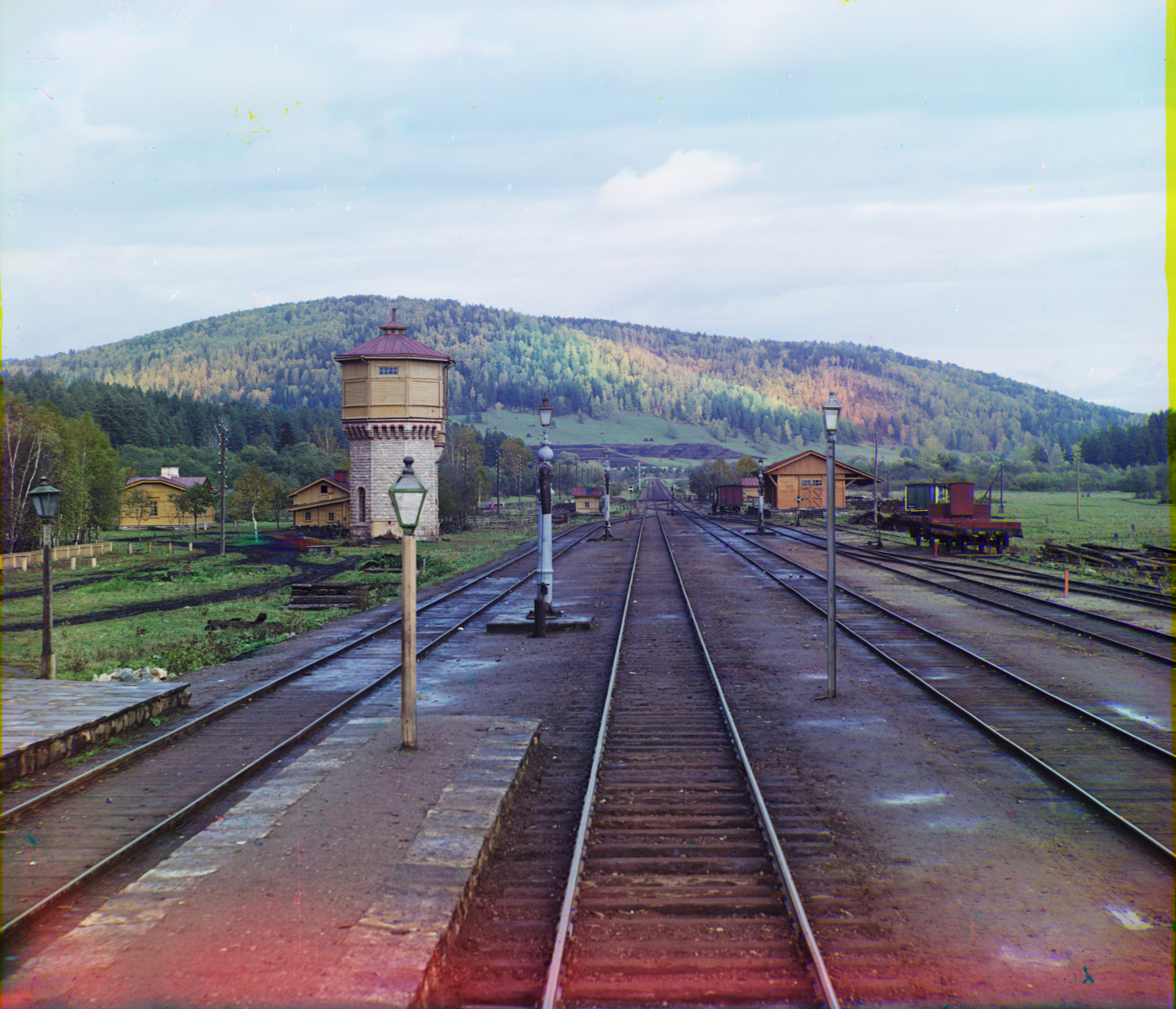
View from the rear platform of the Simskaia railway station of the Samara–Zlatoust Railway, c. 1910

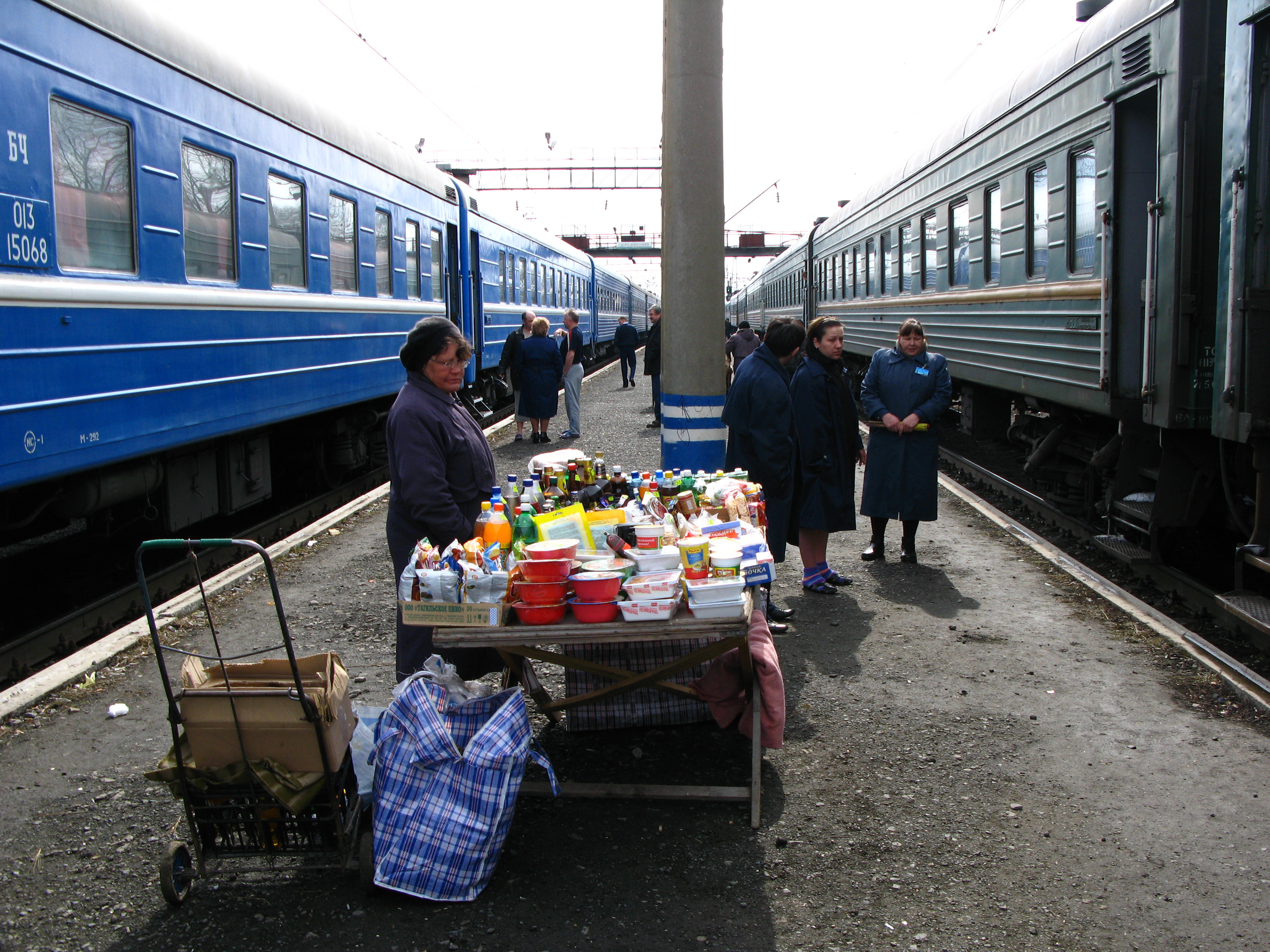
Almost every station on Trans-Siberian Railway has food sellers, often local vendors who sell local food such as fish (like Baikal omul), pirozhki, and potatoes. Besides food stands, there are also small kiosks.

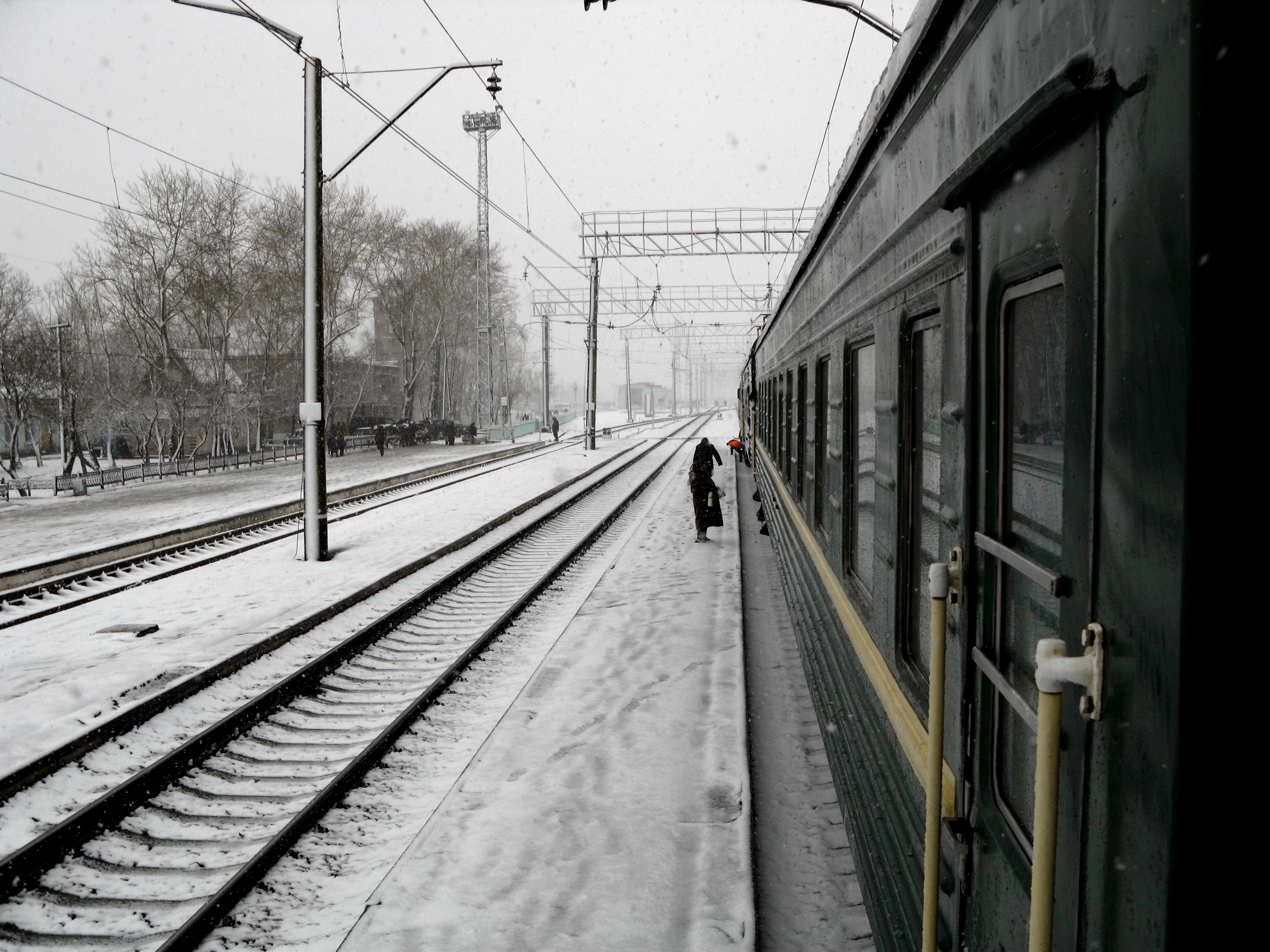
Snow in late April at Nazyvayevsk station, Siberia

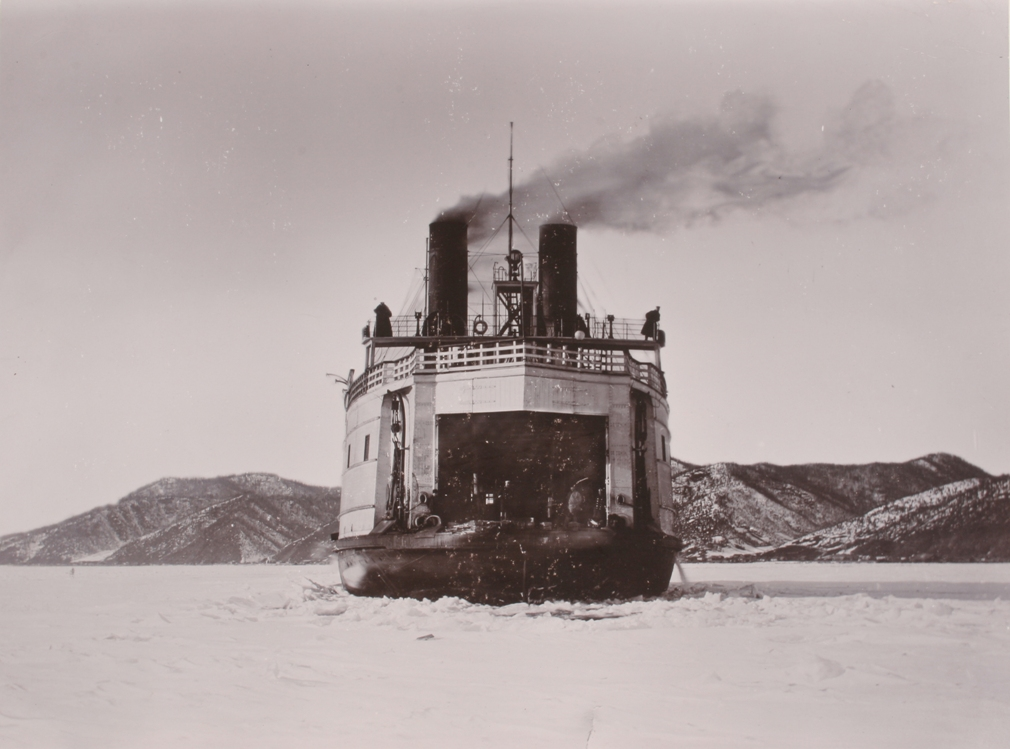
The icebreaking train ferry SS Baikal in service on Lake Baikal

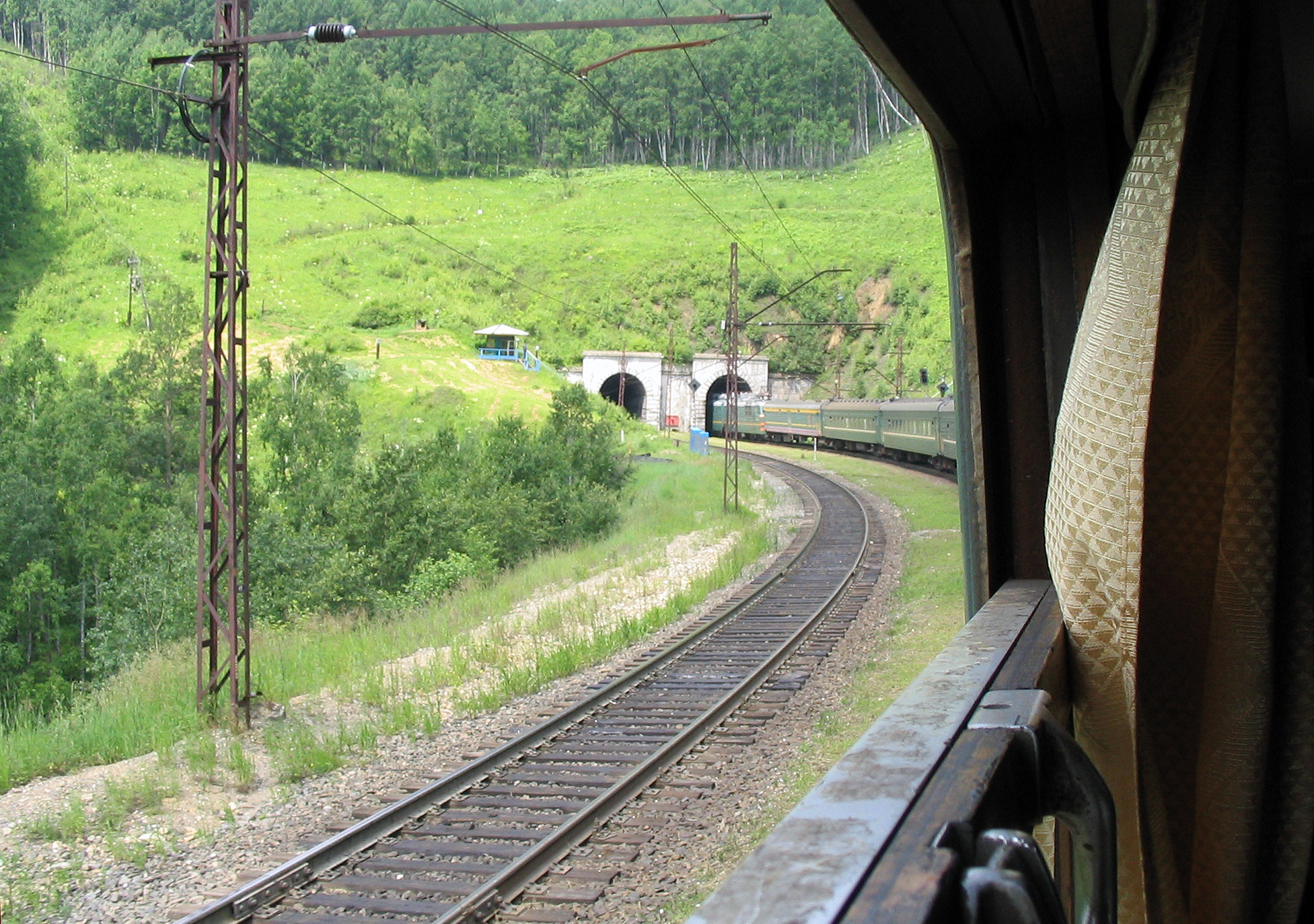
Train entering a Circum-Baikal tunnel west of Kultuk

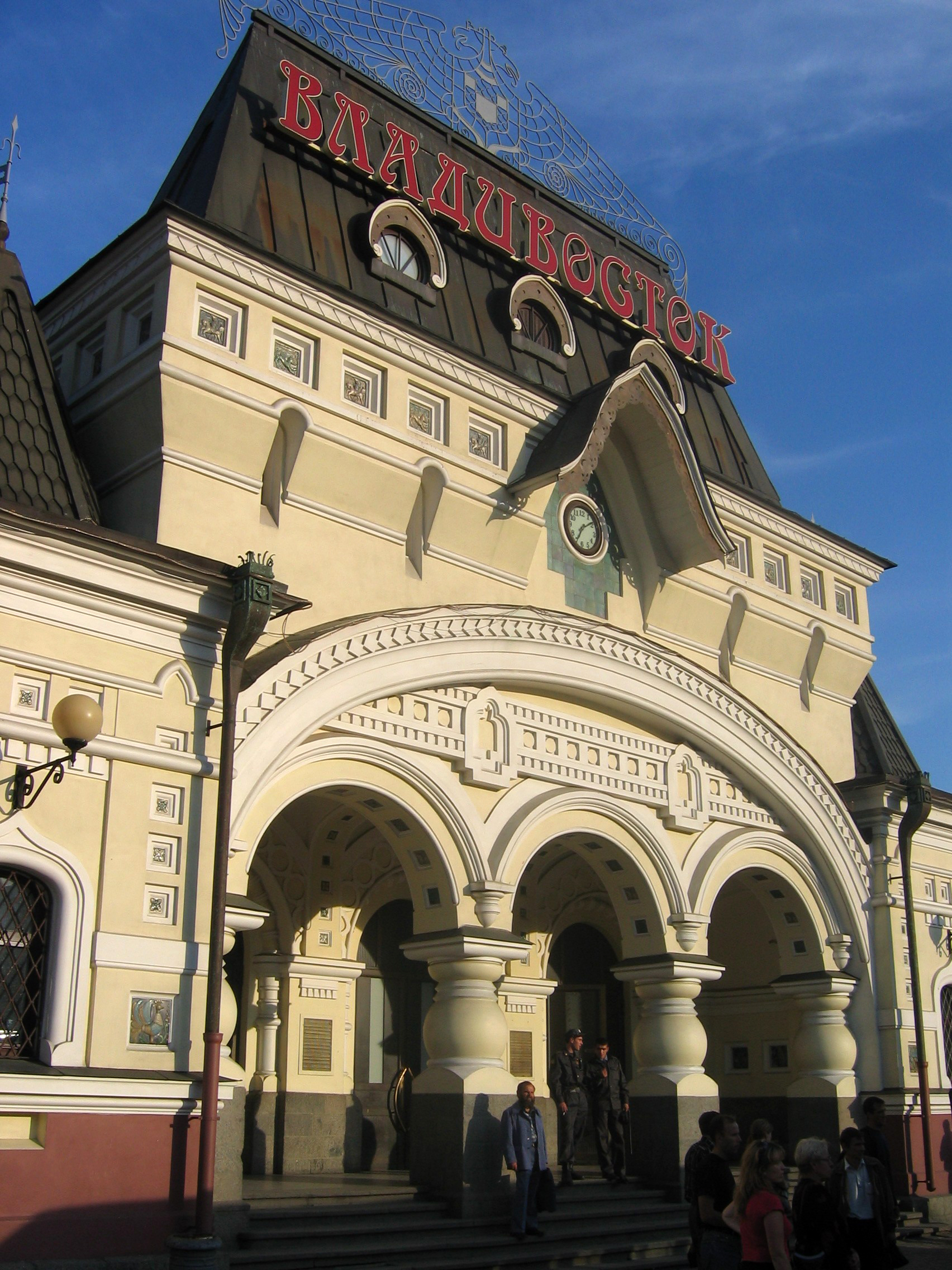
Vladivostok terminus of the Trans-Siberian Railway

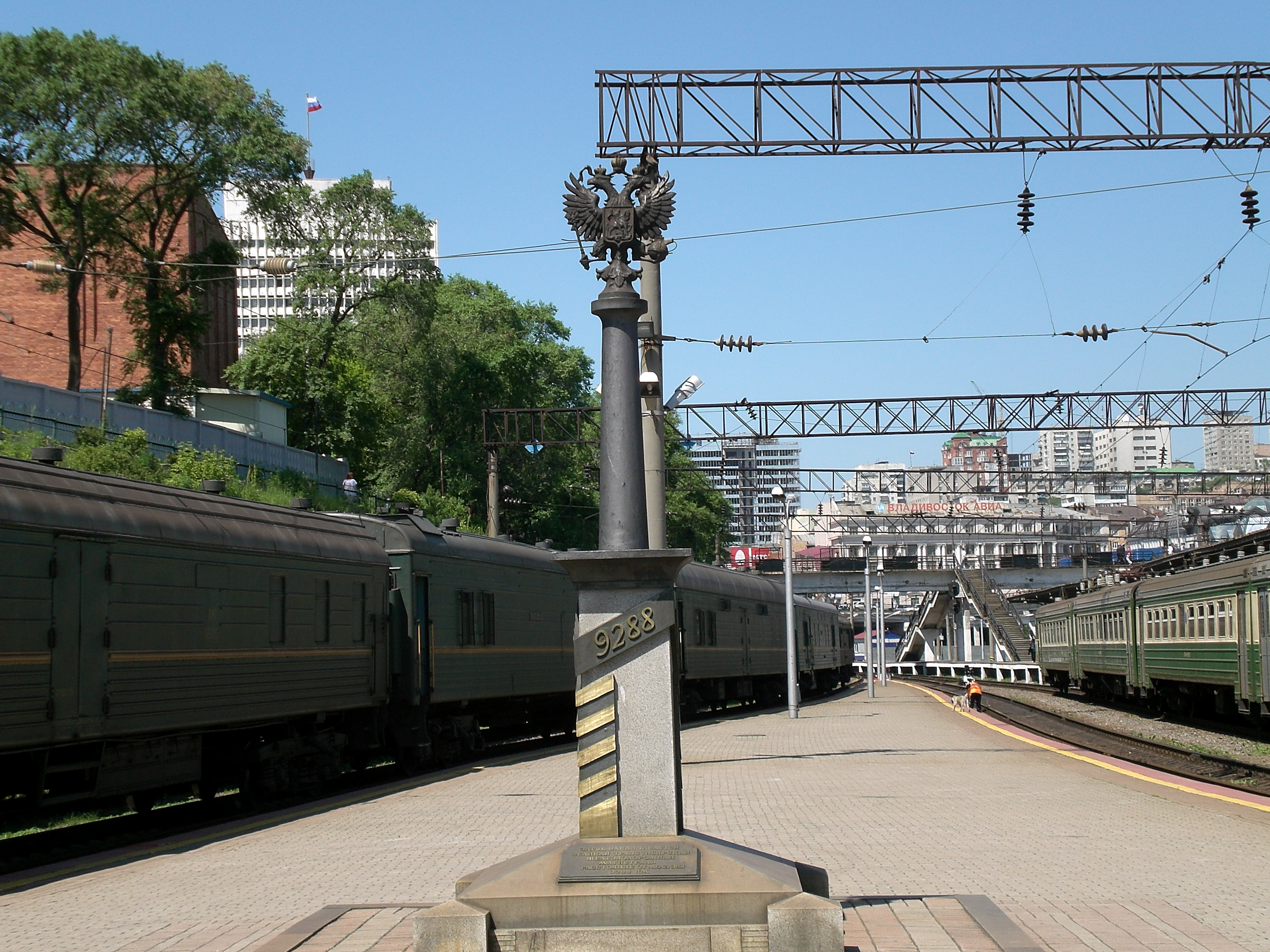
The marker for kilometer 9,288 (mile 5,771.3) at the end of the Trans-Siberian Railway at Vladivostok railway station

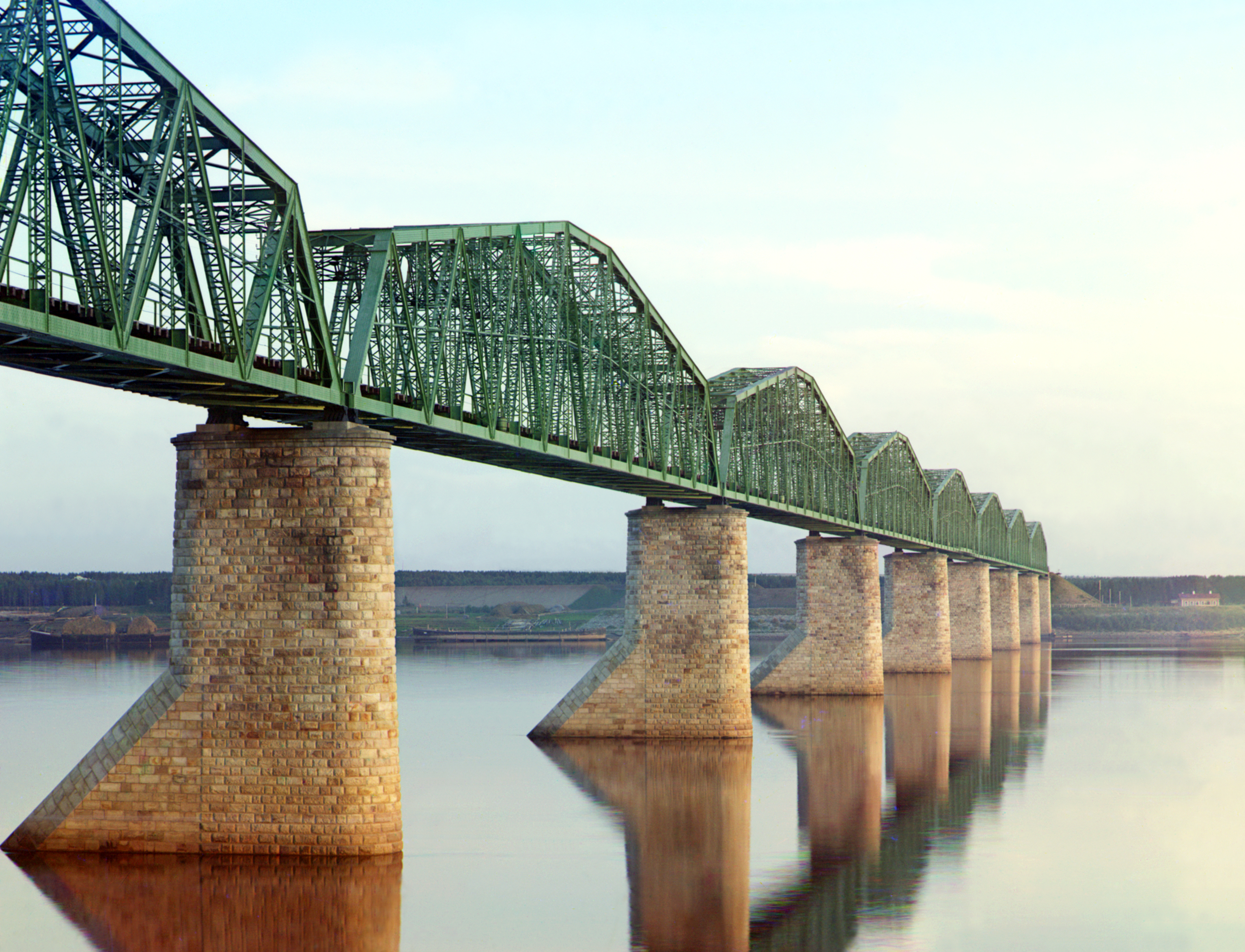
Bridge over the Kama River, near Perm, built in 1912

== Routes ==
=== Trans-Siberian line ===
A commonly used main line route is as follows. Distances and travel times are from the schedule of train No. 002M, Moscow–Vladivostok.

Location	Distance	Travel Time	Time Zone	Notes
Moscow, Yaroslavsky Rail Terminal	0 km (0 mi)		Moscow; Time (MT)	
Vladimir	210 km (130 mi)		MT	
Nizhny Novgorod	461 km (286 mi)	6 hours	MT	On the Volga River
Kirov	917 km (570 mi)	13 hours	MT	On the Vyatka River
Perm	1,397 km (868 mi)	20 hours	MT+2	On the Kama River
Yekaterinburg	1,816 km (1,128 mi)	1 day 2 hours	MT+2	In the Urals, still called by its old Soviet name Sverdlovsk in most timetables
Tyumen	2,104 km (1,307 mi)		MT+2	
Omsk	2,676 km (1,663 mi)	1 day 14 hours	MT+3	On the Irtysh River
Novosibirsk	3,303 km (2,052 mi)	1 day 22 hours	MT+4	On the Ob River; Turk-Sib railway branches from here
Krasnoyarsk	4,065 km (2,526 mi)	2 days 11 hours	MT+4	On the Yenisei River
Taishet	4,483 km (2,786 mi)		MT+5	Junction with the Baikal-Amur Mainline
Irkutsk	5,153 km (3,202 mi)	3 days 4 hours	MT+5	Near Lake Baikal's southern extremity
Ulan Ude	5,609 km (3,485 mi)	3 days 12 hours	MT+5	Eastern shore of Lake Baikal
Junction with the Trans-Mongolian line	5,622 km (3,493 mi)			
Chita	6,166 km (3,831 mi)	3 days 22 hours	MT+6	
Junction with the Trans-Manchurian line at Tarskaya	6,274 km (3,898 mi)		MT+6	
Birobidzhan	8,312 km (5,165 mi)	5 days 13 hours	MT+7	Capital of the Jewish Autonomous Region
Khabarovsk	8,493 km (5,277 mi)	5 days 15 hours	MT+7	On the Amur River
Ussuriysk	9,147 km (5,684 mi)		MT+7	Junction with the Trans-Manchurian line and Korea branch; located in Baranovsky, 13 km (8 miles) from Ussuriysk
Vladivostok	9,289 km (5,772 mi)	6 days 4 hours	MT+7	On the Pacific Ocean
Services to North Korea continue from Ussuriysk via:
Primorskaya station	9,257 km (5,752 mi)	6 days 14 hours	MT+7	
Khasan	9,407 km (5,845 mi)	6 days 19 hours	MT+7	Border with North Korea
Tumangang	9,412 km (5,848 mi)	7 days 10 hours	MT+6	North Korean side of the border
Pyongyang	10,267 km (6,380 mi)	9 days 2 hours	MT+6	

There are many alternative routings between Moscow and Siberia. For example:

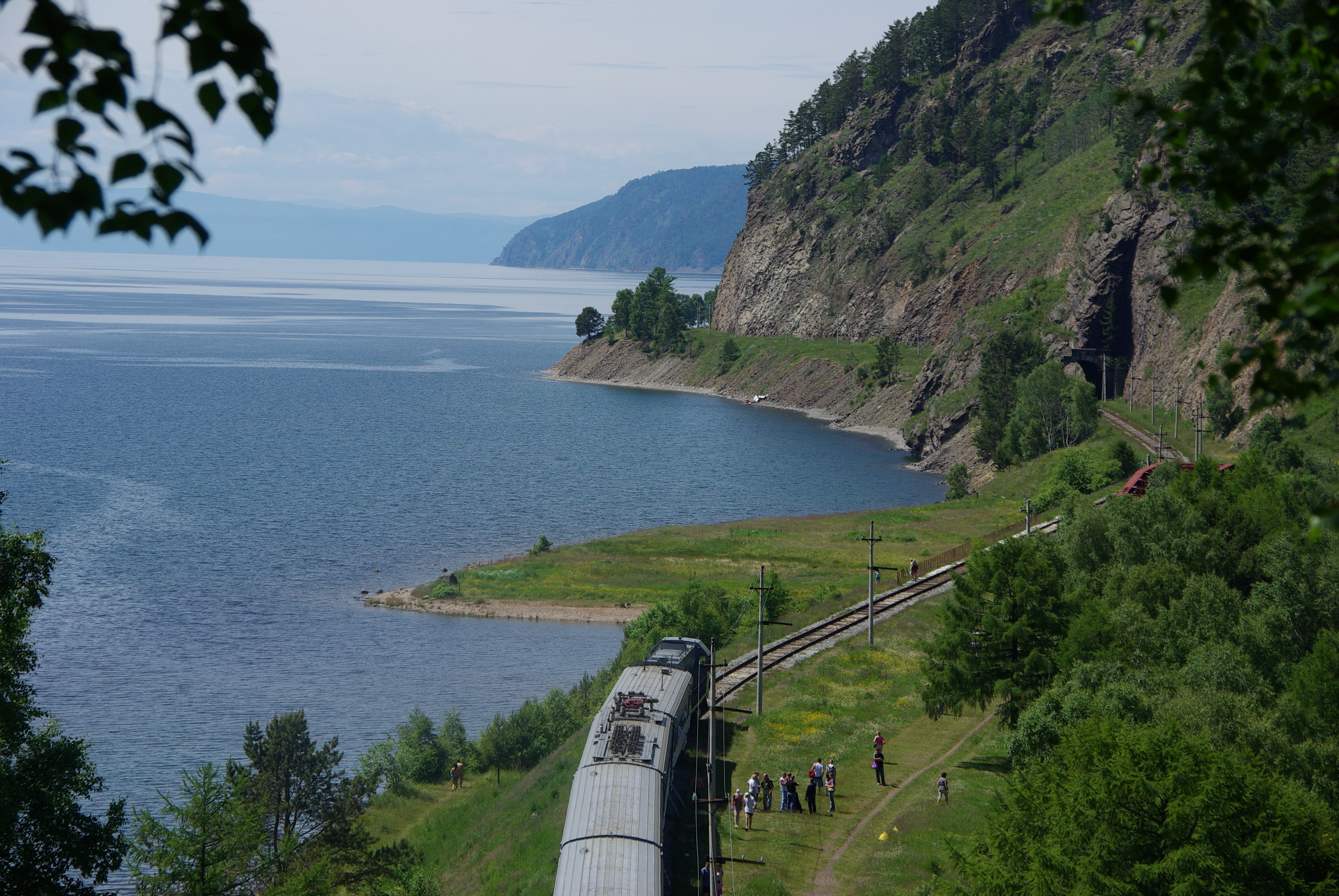
Circum-Baikal railway

- Some trains would leave Moscow from Kazansky Rail Terminal instead of Yaroslavsky Rail Terminal; this would save some 20 km (12 mi) off the distances, because it provides a shorter exit from Moscow onto the Nizhny Novgorod main line.
- One can take a night train from Moscow's Kursky Rail Terminal to Nizhny Novgorod, make a stopover in the Nizhny and then transfer to a Siberia-bound train
- From 1956 to 2001 many trains went between Moscow and Kirov via Yaroslavl instead of Nizhny Novgorod. This would add some 29 km (18 mi) to the distances from Moscow, making the total distance to Vladivostok at 9,288 km (5,771 mi).
- Other trains get from Moscow (Kazansky Terminal) to Yekaterinburg via Kazan.
- Between Yekaterinburg and Omsk it is possible to travel via Kurgan Petropavlovsk (in Kazakhstan) instead of Tyumen.
- One can bypass Yekaterinburg altogether by traveling via Samara, Ufa, Chelyabinsk and Petropavlovsk; this was historically the earliest configuration.

Depending on the route taken, the distances from Moscow to the same station in Siberia may differ by several tens of km (a few dozen miles).

=== Trans-Manchurian line ===
The Trans–Manchurian line, as e.g. used by train No.020, Moscow–Beijing follows the same route as the Trans-Siberian between Moscow and Chita and then follows this route to China:

- Branch off from the Trans-Siberian-line at Tarskaya (6,274 km (3,898 mi) from Moscow)
- Zabaikalsk (6,626 km (4,117 mi)), Russian border town; there is a break-of-gauge
- Manzhouli (6,638 km (4,125 mi) from Moscow, 2,323 km (1,443 mi) from Beijing), Chinese border city
- Harbin (7,573 km (4,706 mi), 1,388 km) Chinese city
- Changchun (7,820 km (4,859 mi) from Moscow) Chinese city
- Beijing (8,961 km (5,568 mi) from Moscow) the Chinese capital

The express train (No. 020) travel time from Moscow to Beijing is just over six days. There is no direct passenger service along the entire original Trans-Manchurian route (i.e., from Moscow or anywhere in Russia, west of Manchuria, to Vladivostok via Harbin), due to the obvious administrative and technical (gauge break) inconveniences of crossing the border twice. Assuming sufficient patience and possession of appropriate visas, however, it is still possible to travel all the way along the original route, with a few stopovers (e.g. in Harbin, Grodekovo and Ussuriysk).

Such an itinerary would pass through the following points from Harbin east:

- Harbin (7,573 km (4,706 mi) from Moscow)
- Mudanjiang (7,928 km (4,926 mi))
- Suifenhe (8,121 km (5,046 mi)), the Chinese border station
- Grodekovo (8,147 km (5,062 mi)), Russia
- Ussuriysk (8,244 km (5,123 mi))
- Vladivostok (8,356 km (5,192 mi))

=== Trans-Mongolian line ===
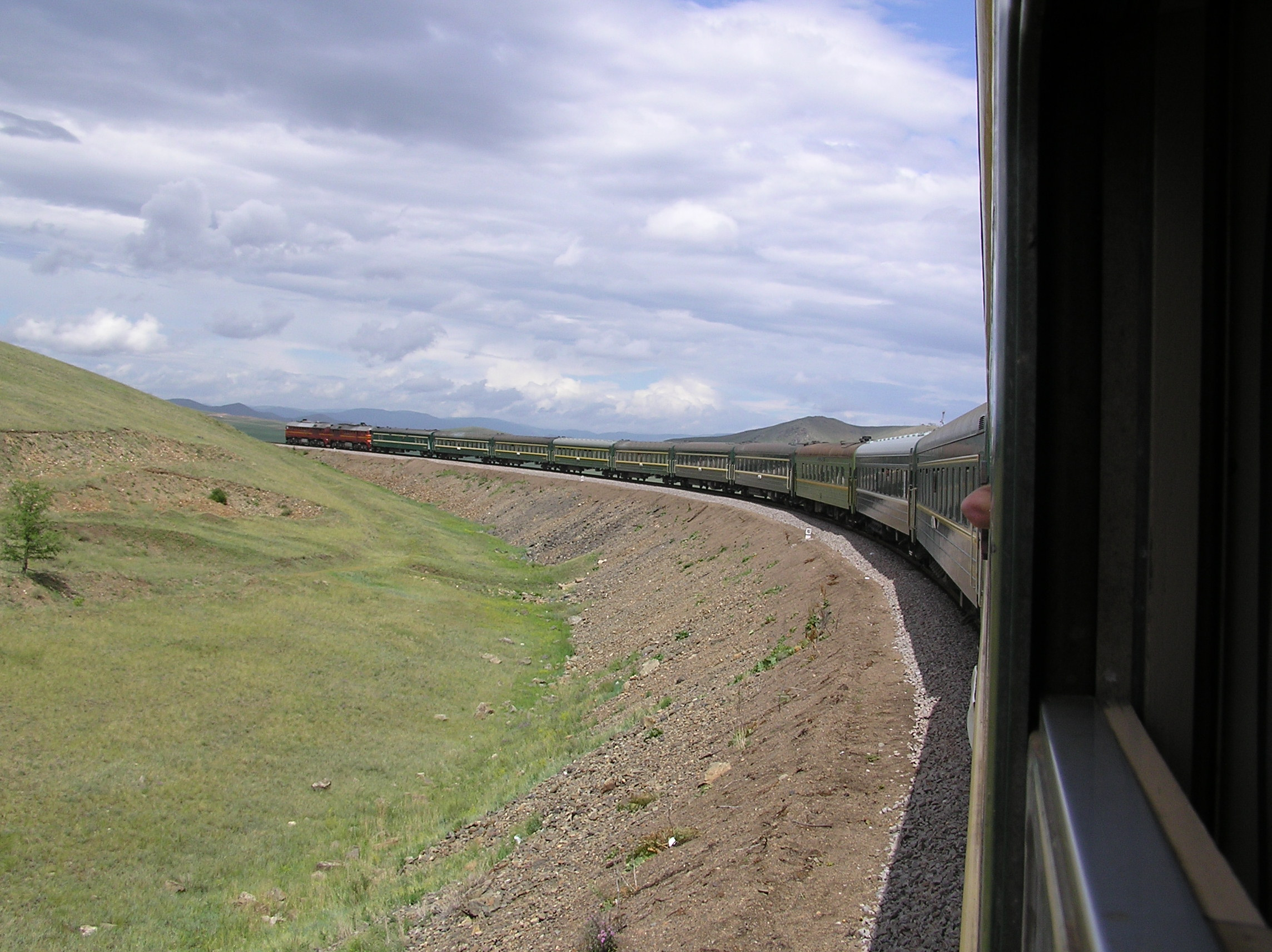
Trans–Mongolian Railway

The Trans–Mongolian line follows the same route as the Trans-Siberian between Moscow and Ulan Ude, and then follows this route to Mongolia and China:

- Branch off from the Trans-Siberian line (5,655 km (3,514 mi) from Moscow)
- Naushki (5,895 km (3,663 mi), MT+5), Russian border town
- Russian–Mongolian border (5,900 km (3,666 mi), MT+5)
- Sükhbaatar (5,921 km (3,679 mi), MT+5), Mongolian border town
- Ulaanbaatar (6,304 km (3,917 mi), MT+5), the Mongolian capital
- Zamyn-Üüd (7,013 km (4,358 mi), MT+5), Mongolian border city
- Erenhot (842 km (523 mi) from Beijing, MT+5), Chinese border city
- Datong (371 km (231 mi), MT+5) Chinese city
- Beijing (MT+5) the Chinese capital

== Highest point ==
The highest point of Trans–Siberian Railroad is at Yablonovy pass at an altitude of 1,070 metres (3,510 ft) situated in the Yablonoi Mountains, in Transbaikal (mainly in Zabaykalsky Krai), Siberia, Russia. The Trans–Siberian Railroad passes the mountains at Chita and runs parallel to the range before going through a tunnel to bypass the heights.

== See also ==
- Baikal–Amur Mainline
- Eastbound
- Famous trains
- History of Siberia
- Russian gauge
  - Broad gauge
- Russian Railways
- Sibirjak
- Starlight Express, a train musical in which a character is modeled on the Trans-Siberian Express
- Suicide of Renata Kambolina, involving a train on this system
- Trans-Siberian Railway Panorama

== Travel handbooks ==
- Richmond, Simon (2018). Trans-Siberian Railway (6 ed.). London: Lonely Planet. ISBN 978-1-78657-459-6.
- Thomas, Bryn (2014) [1988]. Trans-Siberian Handbook (9 ed.). London: Trailblazer. ISBN 978-1-905864-56-0.
