= Heal the Living =

- Theatrical release poster
- French: Réparer les vivants
- Directed by: Katell Quillévéré
- Screenplay by: Katell Quillévéré; Gilles Taurand
- Based on: Réparer les vivants (Mend the Living) by Maylis de Kerangal
- Produced by: David Thion; Justin Taurand; Philippe Martin
- Starring: Tahar Rahim; Emmanuelle Seigner; Anne Dorval; Bouli Lanners; Kool Shen; Monia Chokri; Alice Taglioni; Karim Leklou; Alice de Lencquesaing; Finnegan Oldfield; Théo Cholbi; Gabin Verdet; Dominique Blanc
- Cinematography: Tom Harari
- Edited by: Thomas Marchand
- Music by: Alexandre Desplat
- Production companies: Les Films du Bélier; Les Films Pelléas; France 2 Cinéma; Mars Films; Jouror; CN5 Productions; Ezekiel Film Production; Frakas Productions; RTBF; Proximus
- Distributed by: Mars Films (France)
- Release dates: 4 September 2016 (Venice); 1 November 2016 (France)
- Running time: 104 minutes
- Countries: France; Belgium
- Language: French
- Budget: $6.5 million
- Box office: $2.2 million

Heal the Living (French: Réparer les vivants) is a 2016 drama film directed by Katell Quillévéré from a screenplay she co-wrote with Gilles Taurand, based on the 2013 novel Réparer les vivants (Mend the Living) by Maylis de Kerangal. It stars Tahar Rahim, Emmanuelle Seigner, Anne Dorval, Bouli Lanners and Kool Shen. Heal the Living interweaves three stories connected to each other via an organ transplant. The film was presented in the Horizons section at the 73rd Venice International Film Festival.

== Cast ==
- Tahar Rahim as Thomas Rémige
- Emmanuelle Seigner as Marianne
- Anne Dorval as Claire
- Bouli Lanners as Pierre Révol
- Kool Shen as Vincent
- Monia Chokri as Jeanne
- Alice Taglioni as Anne Guérande
- Karim Leklou as Virgilio Breva
- Alice de Lencquesaing as Alice Harfang
- Finnegan Oldfield as Maxime
- Théo Cholbi as Sam
- Gabin Verdet as Simon
- Dominique Blanc as Lucie Moret
- Galatéa Bellugi as Juliette
- Titouan Alda as Johan
- Andranic Manet as Chris
- Irina Muluile as Gisèle
- Steve Tientcheu as Hamé Gaye
- Danielle Arbid as Elsa

== Critical response ==
Heal the Living has a 92% approval rating on Rotten Tomatoes based on 59 reviews, with an average rating of 7.6/10, and an 82/100 on Metacritic based on 12 critics, indicating "universal acclaim".

Variety described the film as "sublimely compassionate, heart-crushing". Screendaily said the film is "an emotionally satisfying, cinematically deft look at interwoven fates...which knits together quietly luminous performances".

== Accolades ==
Award / Film festival	Category	Recipients and nominees	Result
César Awards	Best Adaptation	Katell Quillévéré and Gilles Taurand	Nominated
