= Ian Eisendrath =

American music producer

Ian Eisendrath is an Olivier Award-winning and Grammy-nominated American music supervisor, arranger, music director, and music producer, known for his work in theatre, film, and television.

== Early life and education ==
Eisendrath graduated from the University of Michigan School of Music. From 2003 to 2016, he served as Director of New Work Development and Music Supervisor at the 5th Avenue Theatre in Seattle.

== Career ==
=== Theatre ===
Eisendrath was the music supervisor, arranger, and conductor for the international productions of Come From Away; including Broadway, London, Toronto, Australia, and the North American tour. The production's London company won the Laurence Olivier Award for Best New Musical in 2019, and Eisendrath shared in the award for Outstanding Achievement in Music.

He also served in similar roles for the Broadway productions of Diana and A Christmas Story, as well as theatre projects at La Jolla Playhouse, Pacific Northwest Ballet, Seattle Symphony, ACT, TUTS, Ordway, Casa Mañana, and the Banff Centre for the Arts.

=== Film and television ===
Eisendrath has held roles as executive music producer, vocal producer, conductor, and arranger for major film and television projects, including:

- KPop Demon Hunters (Sony Pictures Animation & Netflix) - string conductor, strings, vocal arranger, producer, recording engineer, strings engineer
- Disney's Snow White (songs by Pasek & Paul; starring Rachel Zegler and Gal Gadot)
- Only Murders in the Building (Hulu)
- Spirited (Apple)
- Lyle, Lyle, Crocodile (Sony)
- The Deb (Unigram)
- Diana (Netflix)
- A Christmas Story Live! (Fox TV)
- Come From Away (Apple TV+ adaptation)

Upcoming projects include Florence Welch's Gatsby and The Heart (La Jolla Playhouse). He also served as music and lyric co-writer for The Heart with Anne Eisendrath.

=== Awards and nominations ===
- Best New Musical and Outstanding Achievement in Music (2019 Olivier Award, Come From Away)
- Best Musical Theater Album (2018 Grammy Nomination, Come From Away - Original Broadway Cast Recording)
