= Maylis de Kerangal =

French author (born 1967)

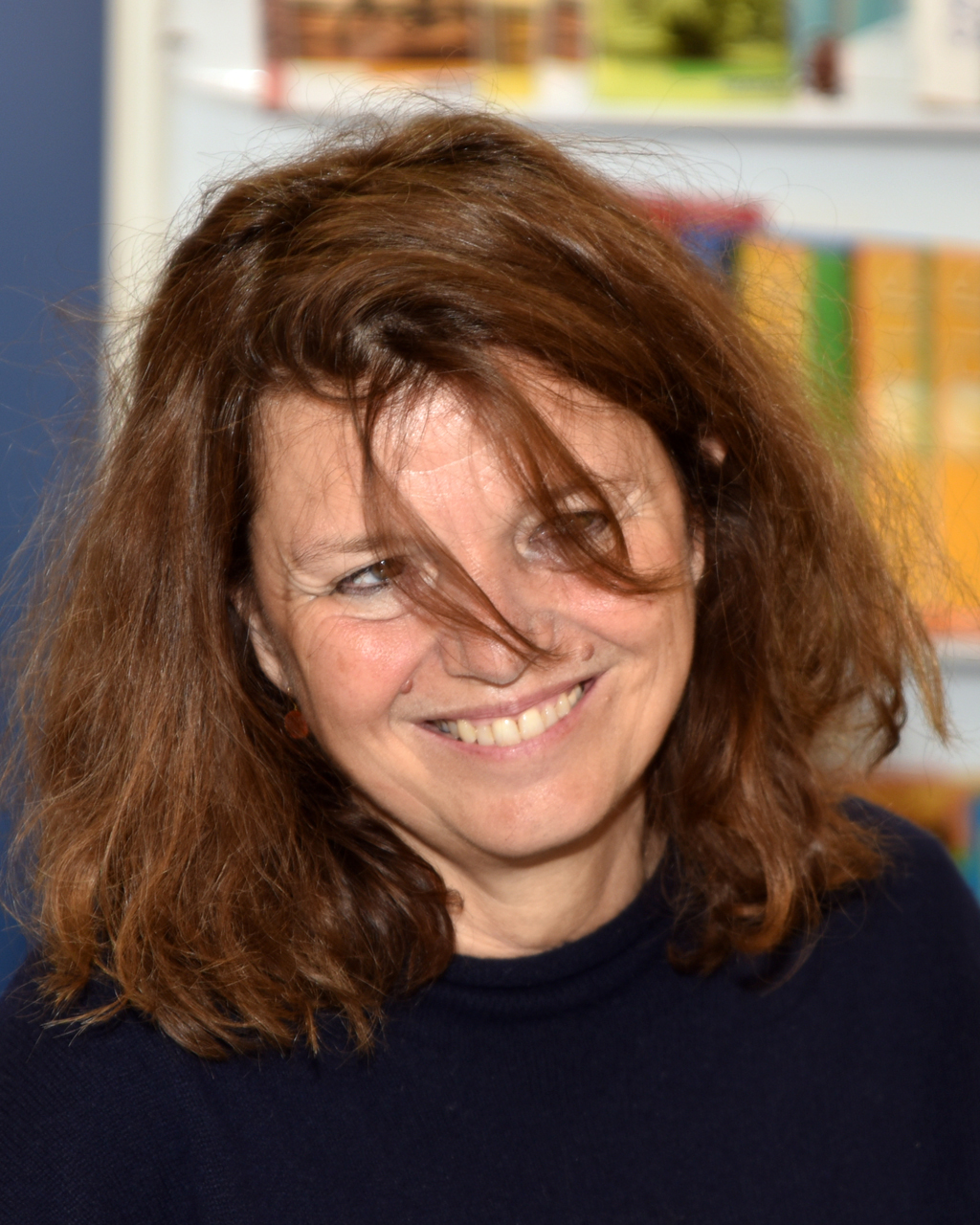
- De Kerangal in 2023
- Born: 16 June 1967 (age 58); Toulon, France
- Occupation: Writer
- Notable work: Birth of a Bridge (Naissance d'un pont, 2010); Mend the Living (Réparer les vivants, 2014)
- Awards: Prix Médicis; Premio Gregor von Rezzori; Grand prix RTL-Lire; Wellcome Book Prize

Maylis de Kerangal (born 16 June 1967) is a French author. Her novels deeply explore people in their work lives. She has won many awards for her work (including the Prix Médicis, the Premio Gregor von Rezzori, the Grand prix RTL-Lire, and the Wellcome Book Prize), and her novels have been published in several languages. Two have been adapted as films.

== Life and career ==
Raised in Le Havre, Maylis de Kerangal studied history and philosophy in Rouen and Paris. She worked at Paris-based Éditions Gallimard in the children and youth department from 1991 to 1996, then travelled in the United States. After her return, she did graduate work at the School for Advanced Studies in the Social Sciences.

De Kerangal wrote her first novel in 2000, and then became a full-time writer. Her celebrated novel, Birth of a Bridge (Naissance d'un pont, 2010) presents a literary saga of a handful of men and women who are charged with building a bridge somewhere in a mythical California. Birth of a Bridge was shortlisted for the Prix Goncourt. It was awarded both the Prix Médicis in 2010 and the Premio Gregor von Rezzori in 2014, and has been translated into several languages worldwide.

Mend the Living (Réparer les vivants, 2014), translated by Jessica Moore and published in the UK, won the Prix Orange du Livre and the Grand prix RTL-Lire in France, and the 2017 Wellcome Book Prize (UK).

Mend the Living was adapted for the stage and produced at the theatre festival in Avignon. It received positive reviews for its intimate look at the realities and philosophical questioning around organ donation. It was adapted as the film Heal the Living (2016). A second English-language translation of the novel by Sam Taylor, entitled The Heart, was published in the US in 2016.

Eastbound (originally released in 2012 as Tangente vers l’est) was named a best book of 2023 by The New York Times.

== Works ==
- Je marche sous un ciel de traîne (Paris: Éditions Verticales, 2000) ISBN 9782843350641
- La Vie voyageuse (Éditions Verticales, 2003) ISBN 978-2843351617
- Ni fleurs ni couronnes (Éditions Verticales, 2006) ISBN 9782070777204
- Dans les rapides (Paris: Éditions Naïve, 2007) ISBN 978-2350210865
- Corniche Kennedy (Éditions Verticales, 2008) ISBN 9782070122196
- Naissance d'un pont (Éditions Verticales, 2010) ISBN 978-2070130504
  - Birth of a Bridge, trans. Jessica Moore (Vancouver, BC: Talonbooks, 2014) ISBN 978-0889228894
- Tangente vers l'est (Éditions Verticales, 2012) ISBN 9782070136742
  - Eastbound, trans. Jessica Moore (New York: Archipelago Books, 2023)
- Réparer les vivants. Paris: Éditions Verticales, 2013. ISBN 9782070144136
  - Mend the Living, trans. Jessica Moore (UK: MacLehose Press and Vancouver: Talonbooks, 2016) ISBN 978-0-88922-973-0
  - The Heart, trans. Sam Taylor (New York: Farrar, Straus and Giroux, 2016) ISBN 978-0-374-24090-5
- À ce stade de la nuit (éditions Guérin, 2014) ISBN 9782070107544
- Un chemin de tables (Seuil, 2016) ISBN 9782370210753
  - The Cook, trans. Sam Taylor (New York: Farrar, Straus and Giroux, 2019) ISBN 9780374120900
- Un monde à portée de main,. Paris: Éditions Verticales, 2018.
  - Painting Time, trans. Jessica Moore (Farrar, Straus and Giroux, 2021)
- Kiruna (La Contre Allée, 2019)
- Pour que droits et dignité ne s'arrêtent pas au pied des murs (Seuil, 2021)
- Canoës (éditions Verticales, 2021)
  - Canoes, trans. Jessica Moore (MacLehose Press, 2023)
- Seyvoz, with Joy Sorman (éditions Inculte, 2022)
- Un archipel. Fiction, récits, essais (Presses de l'Université de Montréal, 2022)
- Jour de ressac (éditions Verticales, 2024)

== Awards and honours ==
- 2010: Prix Médicis for Naissance d'un pont
- 2010: Prix Franz-Hessel for Naissance d'un pont
- 2012: Prix Landerneau for Tangente vers l'est
- 2014: Prix France Culture/Télérama for Réparer les vivants
- 2014: Grand prix RTL-Lire for Réparer les vivants
- 2014: Prix des lecteurs de L'Express-BFM TV for Réparer les vivants
- 2014: Prix Relay for Réparer les vivants
- 2014: Prix Orange du Livre for Réparer les vivants
- 2014: Grand prix de littérature Henri-Gal for her body of work
- 2014: Premio Gregor von Rezzori for Naissance d’un pont
- 2016: Premio Boccace for À ce stade de la nuit
- 2017: Wellcome Book Prize for Mend the Living
- 2022: Prix de la revue Études françaises for Un archipel. Fiction, récits, essais
