= Queffélec =

Queffélec is a French surname. Notable people with this name include:

- Amanda Queffélec-Maruani (born 1978), French novelist, playwright, screenwriter and filmmaker
- Henri Queffélec (1910–1992), French writer and screenwriter
  - Anne Queffélec (born 1948), French pianist, daughter of Henri
  - Martine Queffélec (born 1949), French mathematician, daughter-in-law of Henri
  - Yann Queffélec (born 1949), French novelist, son of Henri
- Thierry Queffelec, Administrator Superior of Wallis and Futuna
