= Grand prix de littérature de la SGDL =

French literary award

The grand prix de littérature de la SGDL is a French literary prize created by the Société des gens de lettres in 1947 in order to reward an author for the whole of his work, and which is given during the spring session of the society.

Beginning in 1995, the prize rewards an author for a specific book.

== List of laureates ==
=== 1947–1994 ===
- 1947: Louis Martin-Chauffier
- 1948: Joseph Jolinon
- 1949: Germaine Beaumont
- 1950: Francis de Miomandre
- 1951: Vincent Muselli
- 1952: Claude Aveline
- 1953: Gabriel Audisio
- 1954: Franz Hellens
- 1955: Jean Bonnerot
- 1956: Henri Malherbe
- 1957: André Beucler
- 1958: René Béhaine
- 1959: Jules Bertaut
- 1960: Albert t'Serstevens
- 1961: Raymond Las Vergnas
- 1962: Marie Noël
- 1963: Alphonse Séché
- 1964: Maurice Rat
- 1965: Pierre Lafue
- 1966: Fernand Méry
- 1967: Luc Bérimont
- 1968: Jean Fougère
- 1969: Georges Mongrédien
- 1970: Lise Weill
- 1971: Roger Grenier
- 1972: Roger Bésus
- 1973: Philippe Soupault
- 1974: Geneviève Gennari
- 1975: Emmanuel Berl
- 1976: Pierre Boulle
- 1977: Catherine Paysan
- 1978: Georges Blond
- 1979: Michel Peyramaure
- 1980: Bertrand de Jouvenel
- 1981: Charles Le Quintrec
- 1982: Raymond Abellio
- 1983: Jean Cassou
- 1984: Claude Roy
- 1985: Francis Ponge
- 1986: Jean Tardieu
- 1987: Yves Bonnefoy
- 1988: André Dhôtel
- 1989: Noël Devaulx
- 1990: Robert Pinget
- 1991: Pierre Gascar
- 1992: Henri Thomas
- 1993: Jacques Borel
- 1994: Jacques Roubaud

=== Since 1995 ===
- 1995: Bruno Gay-Lussac (prize declined by the author)
- 1996: Georges-Emmanuel Clancier, Une ombre sarrasine, Albin Michel
- 1997: Louis-René des Forêts, Ostinato, Mercure de France
- 1998: Pascal Quignard, Vie secrète, Éditions Gallimard
- 1999: Béatrix Beck, Guidée par le songe et Confidences de gargouilles, Éditions Grasset
- 2000: Frédérick Tristan, Les Obsèques prodigieuses d'Abraham Radjec, Fayard
- 2001: Daniel Boulanger, Les Mouches et l'Âne, Grasset
- 2002: Pierre Bergounioux, Le Premier Mot, Gallimard, and Un peu de bleu dans le paysage, Verdier
- 2003: Dominique Rolin, Lettre à Lise, Gallimard
- 2004: Pierre Michon, Corps du roi, Verdier
- 2005: Henry Bauchau, L'Enfant bleu, Actes Sud
- 2006: Jacqueline Harpman, Du côté d'Ostende, Grasset
- 2007: Gilles Lapouge, Le Bois des amoureux, Albin Michel
- 2008: Patrick Grainville, Lumière du rat, Éditions du Seuil
- 2009: Jean-Noël Pancrazi, Montecristi, Gallimard
- 2010: François Emmanuel, Jours de tremblement, Le Seuil; Joël Schmidt, Un cri pour deux, Albin Michel
- 2011: Serge Doubrovsky, Un homme de passage, Grasset
- 2012: Sylvie Germain, Rendez-vous nomades, Albin Michel
- 2013: Hubert Haddad, Le Peintre d'éventail and Les Haïkus du peintre d'éventail, Zulma
- 2014: Chantal Thomas, L’Échange des princesses, Seuil
- 2015: Laurent Mauvignier, Autour du monde, Éditions de Minuit
- 2016: René Depestre, Popa Singer, Zulma
