= Georges-Olivier Châteaureynaud =

French writer

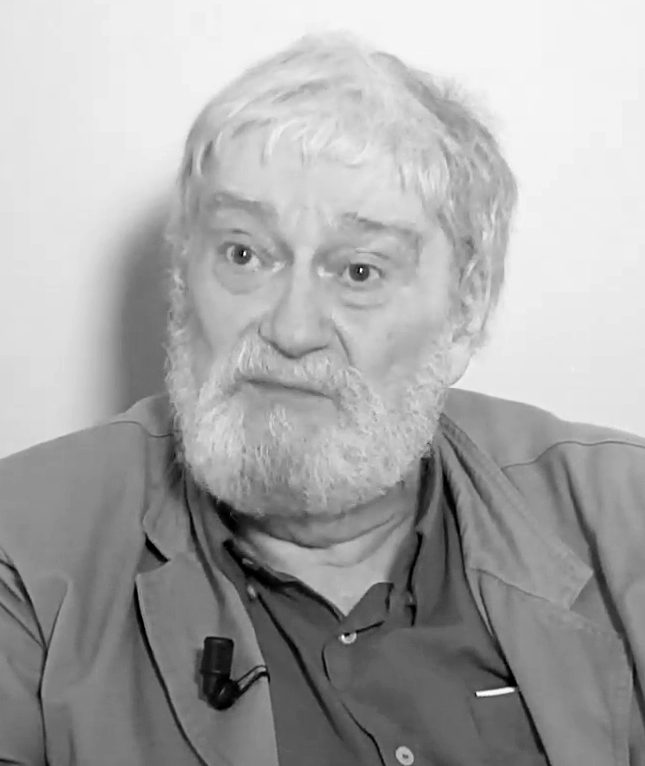
- Châteaureynaud in 2013
- Born: 25 September 1947 (age 78); Paris, France
- Occupation: Writer
- Writing career
- Language: French
- Years active: 1973–present
- Genres: Novel; short story
- Notable work: La Faculté des songes (1982)
- Notable awards: Prix Renaudot (1982); Prix Goncourt de la nouvelle (2005)
- Movement: Nouvelle fiction

Georges-Olivier Châteaureynaud (born 1947 in Paris) is a French novelist and short story writer. He was awarded the Prix Renaudot in 1982 for the novel La Faculté des songes and the Prix Goncourt de la nouvelle in 2005 for Singe savant tabassé par deux clowns. He has been general secretary of the Prix Renaudot since 2010.

== Biography ==
Georges-Olivier Châteaureynaud was born in Paris in 1947. After the divorce of his parents, he lived alone with his mother, first in a maid's room in Paris and then in suburban cities. His childhood is marked by precariousness - housing difficulties in the post-war years - and his mother's depression. The paternal grandfather, an official in the Ministry of Finance, is his paternal figure. With his grandparents, uncles, aunts and cousins, he spent all his holidays in Brittany. These biographical elements are to be found in many of Châteaureynaud's texts, always from the point of view of fiction. His work should not be regarded as autobiographical, with the exception of La Vie nous regarde passer, where Châteaureynaud evokes his childhood and youth, his years of training, the discovery of literature (especially fantastic) and his meeting with his future companions.

In the 1970s, he and his friend Hubert Haddad founded several literary magazines, with only a few deliveries, but which definitely oriented his literary commitment.

In 1973 he published Le Fou dans la chaloupe at Éditions Grasset, a collection of three books of three long stories, and in 1974 the novel The Messengers , which won the Prix des Nouvelles littérares. Until the Renaudot was awarded in 1982, he earned his living by successively working as a cashier, a truck driver at the Saviem, a dealer, and a librarian, while continuing his literary work.

Georges-Olivier Châteaureynaud won the Prix Renaudot for La Faculté des songes in 1982. Since 1996, he has been a member of the jury for this award. He is part of the current called magic realism. Olivier Châtaureynaud chaired the Société des gens de lettres from 2000 to 2002 and is now one of the directors. He is a member of numerous literary juries including the Prix Bretagne. Since 2010, he has been general secretary of the Prix Renaudot.

== Work ==
The author of an important work - one hundred short stories and nine novels published to date - Chateaureynaud builds a personal and poetic universe. His texts, which are often described as fantastic, are rather related to the dream domain. There is nothing gory or bloody in his writings, but a peculiar vision of the world and of society, which deliberately deviates from social observation and autofiction.

In particular, Châteaureynaud developed his ideas on fantasy in his preface to Divinités du Styx , an anthology of the stories of Marcel Schneider, one of his avowed models. After referring to the very diverse ways in which Schneider and Roger Caillois have spoken of the fantastic, Châteaureynaud rejected Caillois's conception that fear would necessarily be a predominant feeling in fantastic literature. On many occasions, Chateaureynaud thus expressed the high opinion that he, like Marcel Schneider, has of the prestige of fantastic, a literature according to him better able than the different realistic currents to grasp the reality of being.

He is one of the artisans of the revival of short story in France in the 1970s, with Annie Saumont, Claude Pujade-Renaud or Christiane Baroche.

Châteaurenaud belongs to the literary group of the nouvelle fiction, a group created in the 1990s around the writer Frederick Tristan.

== Bibliography ==
- 1973: Le Fou dans la chaloupe, Grasset
- 1974 Les Messagers, Grasset and Actes Sud, 1997
- 1976: La Belle charbonnière, Grasset
- 1978: Mathieu Chain, Grasset
- 1982: La Faculté des songes, Grasset, ISBN 978-2246261810, Prix Renaudot,
- 1985: Le Congrès de fantomologie, Grasset
- 1989: Le Jardin dans l'île
- 1993: Nouvelles, 1972-1988, Juillard
- 1994: Le Château de verre, Julliard
- 1994: La Fortune, le Castor astral
- 1996: Les Ormeaux, Éditions du Rocher
- 1996: Le Jardin dans l’île (et autre nouvelles), Librio
- 1997: Le Kiosque et le Tilleul, Actes Sud
- 1997: Le Goût de l'ombre, Actes Sud
- 1999: La Conquête du Pérou, Ed. du Rocher
- 1999: Le Héros blessé au bras, Actes Sud
- 1999: Le Démon à la crécelle, Grasset
- 2002: Civils de plomb, Ed. du Rocher
- 2002: Les Amants sous verre, Le Verger
- 2004: Au fond du paradis, Grasset
- 2004: L’Ange et les Démons, Grasset
- 2004: Petite suite cherbourgeoise, with Hubert Haddad and Frédérick Tristan, Le Rocher
- 2005: Singe savant tabassé par deux clowns, Grasset, Prix Goncourt de la nouvelle
- 2006: Les Intermittences d'Icare, Éditions du Chemin de fer
- 2006: Mécomptes cruels, Rhubarbe
- 2007, L’Autre Rive, Grasset, Grand prix de l'Imaginaire
- 2010: Le Corps de l’autre, Grasset
- 2011: La Vie nous regarde passer, Grasset
- 2011: Résidence dernière, éditions des Busclats
- 2013: Jeune vieillard assis sur une pierre en bois, Grasset,
- 2014: C'était écrit, Rhubarbe
- 2016: Le Goût de l’ombre, Grasse

The works of Georges-Olivier Châteaureynaud have been translated into some fifteen languages.

=== Works in English translation ===
- A Life on Paper: Stories (trans. Edward Gauvin; 2010) ISBN 978-1-931520-62-1 (Small Beer Press)
- The Messengers (trans. Edward Gauvin; 2025) ISBN 978-1-939663-99-3 (Wakefield Press)

== About the author ==
- 2010: Christine Bini, Le Marbre et la Brume : L'univers littéraire de Georges-Olivier Châteaureynaud, Alphée
