= Prix Breizh =

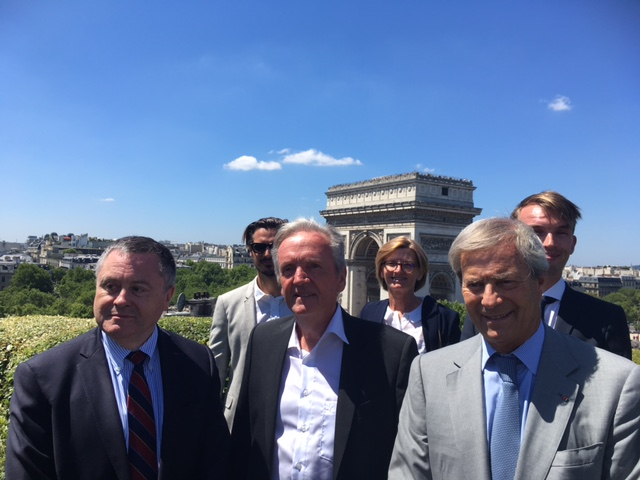
The winner of the 2018 Breizh Prize surrounded by Philippe Le Guillou and Vincent Bolloré.

The prix Breizh is a French literary award bestowed under this name since 2001, on the initiative of Gwenn-Aël Bolloré. On that date, it succeeded the "Prix Bretagne" created in 1961. It crowns each year an author of Breton origin or friend of Brittany.

== History ==
The prix Breizh-prix Bretagne was founded in 1961 by Bretons of Paris, around Pascal Pondaven and Charles Le Quintrec, director and editor-in-chief of the weekly La Bretagne à Paris.

== The Prix Bretagne today ==
The Prix Bretagne, now under the patronage of Vincent Bolloré, celebrated its 50th anniversary in 2011. On this occasion, a monograph Prix Bretagne Prix Breizh 50 ans traced its history (list of laureates from 1961 to 2010, texts of the 12 members of the jury).

The spirit that presides over the awarding of the Prix Bretagne could be summed up by the introduction to his thanks by Kenneth White, the 2006 winner:

"I must also say at once that I attach great importance to this prize. In awarding it, here at the Bibliothèque Nationale de France, to an extravagant Scotsman of my species, a Frenchman of adoption, a European of wit, the jury of the Brittany Prize clearly shows in my eyes his intention to remove Brittany from all the confinements with which it has suffered, and to extricate Celtic culture from all the ignoble or malicious caricatures of which it has been the victim."

In 2013, the Prix Bretagne was awarded a sum of 6100 €.

== Jury ==
In its early days, the Prix Breizh-Prix Bretagne included writers such as Roger Nimier, Hervé Bazin, Paul Guimard, Henri Queffélec, Jean Marin.

Composition of the 2012 jury:

- President, Philippe Le Guillou
- General secretary, Jean Bothorel
- Members : Annick Cojean, Stéphanie Janicot, Georges-Olivier Châteaureynaud, Jean-François Coatmeur, Georges Guitton, Sébastien Le Fol, Patrick Mahé, Gilles Martin-Chauffier, Jean Picollec, Patrick Poivre d’Arvor.

=== Laureates ===
Year	Author	Work	Publisher
1961	Yves Le Scal	Le novice du 'Tamaris'	Éditions André Bonne
1962	Louis Martin-Chauffier	for all his body of work	
1963	Georges Bordonove	Chien de feu	Julliard
1964	Pierre-Jakez Hélias	Maner Kuz (manoir secret)	André Silvaire
1965	Jean David	Assassin	Éditions du Seuil
1966	Yann Brekilien	La Vie quotidienne des paysans en Bretagne au XIX°siècle	Hachette
1967	Xavier de Langlais	Le Roman du roi Arthur	Éditions Piazza
1968	Jean-Claude Andro	La Mer des Sargasses	Éditions Denoël
1969	Georges Guérin	Virgo et Argo	Éditions du Seuil
1970	Yvonne Chauffin	La Cellule	Plon
1971	Jean-François Chiappe	Georges Cadoudal ou la liberté	Éditions Perrin
1972	Xavier Grall	La fête de nuit	Kelenn
1973	Gérard Le Gouic	Poèmes de mon vivant	Telen Arvor
1974	Georges Perros	Papiers collés	Gallimard
1975	Eugène Guillevic	"for all his work"	
1976	Jean Sulivan	Matinales	Gallimard
1977	Jean-Edern Hallier	Le premier qui dort réveille l'autre	Le Sagittaire
1978	Louis Guilloux	"for all his work and for Carnets"	Gallimard
1979	Maurice Le Lannou	Un Bleu de Bretagne	Hachette
1980	Michel Mohrt	"for all his work"	
1981	Alain Lemoigne	L'année de passage	La Table Ronde
1982	Cathy Stephan	L'Homme-privilège	La Table Ronde
1983	Bernard Simiot	Ces messieurs de Saint-Malo	Albin Michel
1984	Hervé Le Boterf	Le brave général Cambronne	Éditions France-Empire
1985	Antony Lhéritier	"for all his work"	
1986	Jean Laugier	"for all his work"	
1987	Philippe Le Guillou	Le Dieu noir	Mercure de France
1988	Maurice Polard	Le Naufrageur	Gallimard
1989	Yves La Prairie	"for all his work"	
1990	André Le Gal	Le Roi des chiens	JC Lattès
1991	Yak Rivais	Le géant de la mer	Jean Picollec
1992	Jean-François Coatmeur	Des croix sur la mer	Albin Michel
1993	Hervé Roy	L'horizon des évènements	Le Cherche midi
1994	Georges-Olivier Chateaureynaud	Le Château de verre	Julliard
1995	Margot Bruyère	L'Enfant d'outre-tombe	Aléas
1996	Not awarded		
1997	Yann Apperry	Qui vive	Les Editions de Minuit
1998	Colette Vlérick	La fille du goémonier	Presses de la Cité
1999	Anne-Marie Castelain	Un été bigouden	Liv'édition
2000	Not awarded		

Year	Author	Work	Publisher
2001	Marie Le Drian.	La cabane d'Hippolyte	Julliard
2002	Jean-Luc Coatalem	Je suis dans les mers du sud sur les traces de Gauguin	Grasset
2003	Yann Queffélec	Boris après l'amour	Fayard
2004	Michel Chaillou.	1945	Éditions du Seuil
2005	Charles Le Quintrec.	pour l'ensemble de son œuvre	
2006	Kenneth White.	La maison des marées	Albin Michel
2007	Jean-Paul Kauffmann.	La maison du retour	NiL Éditions
2008	Stéphane Hoffmann.	Des filles qui dansent	Albin Michel
2009	Mona Ozouf.	Composition française : retour sur une enfance bretonne	Gallimard
2010	Marie Le Gall	La peine du menuisier	Éditions Phébus
2011	Anthony Palou	Fruits et Légumes	Albin Michel
2012	Claire Fourier	Les silences de la guerre	Éditions Dialogues
2013	Olivier Adam.	Les Lisières	Flammarion
2014	Irène Frain	Sorti de rien	Éditions du Seuil
2015	Cédric Morgan.	Une femme simple	Grasset
2016	Lorraine Fouchet.	Entre ciel et Lou	Héloïse d'Ormesson
