= Rue La Boétie =

Street in Paris, France

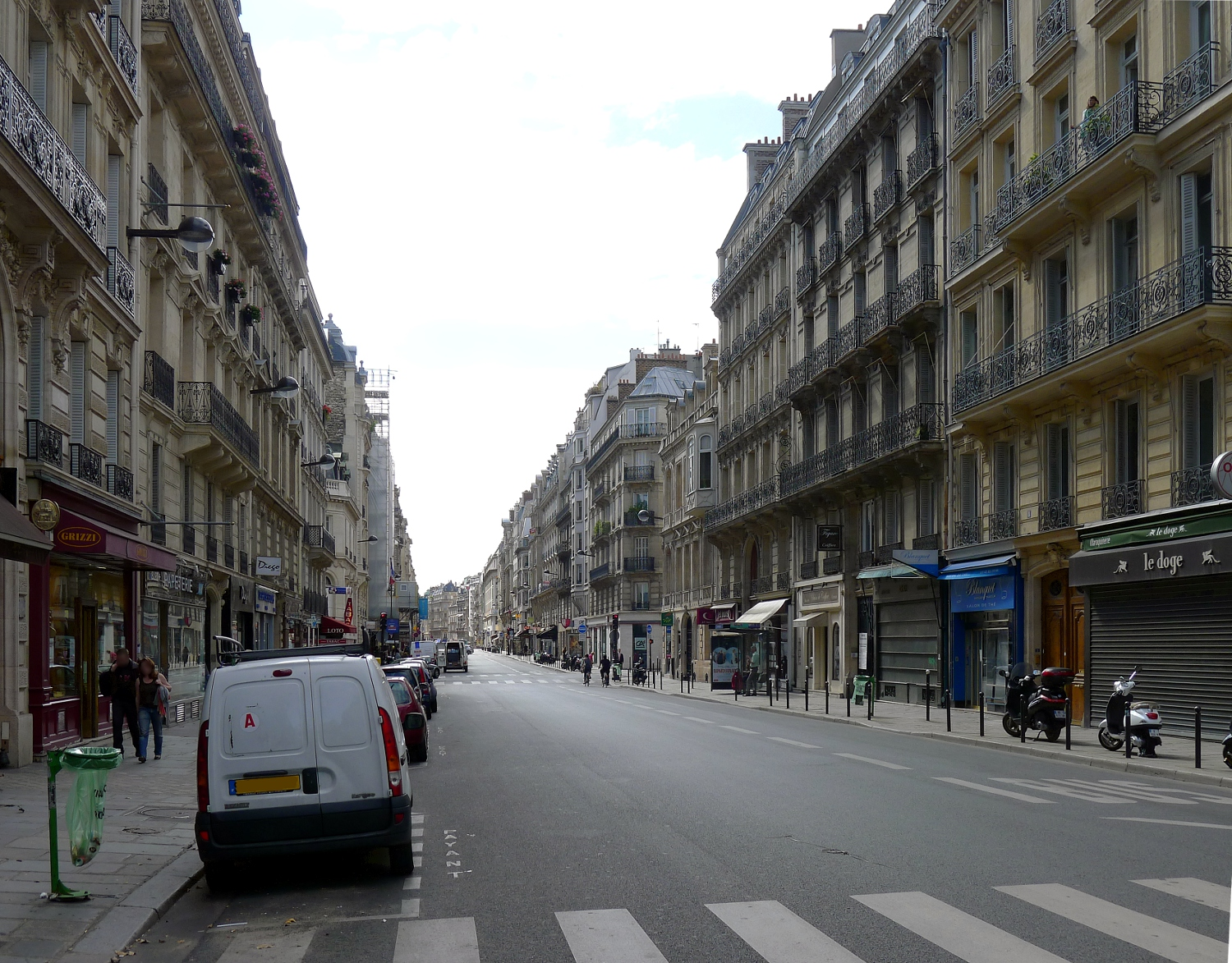
- Rue La Boétie

- Location within Paris
- Namesake: Étienne de La Boétie
- Arrondissement: 8th
- Quarter: Champs-Élysées; Faubourg du Roule
- Coordinates: 48.8732°N 2.3123°E
- From: Rue d'Astorg
- To: Champs-Élysées

Construction
- Completion: 29 November 1777
- Denomination: 2 March 1864

Rue La Boétie (French pronunciation: [ʁy la bɔesi]; La Boétie Street) is a street in the 8th arrondissement of Paris, running from the Rue d'Astorg to the Avenue des Champs-Élysées. It is named in honour of Étienne de La Boétie (1530–1563), friend of moralist Michel de Montaigne.

== History ==
From 1640, the space today found between the streets of the Colosseum and Berri, the Avenue des Champs-Élysées and the Rue du Faubourg-Saint-Honoré was occupied by the Royal nursery, which supplied the royal residences with trees, shrubs and flowers. Decommissioned under the Régence to make way for a subdivision planned by John Law, the plan was eventually dropped.

In 1755, the land became the property of Louis Phélypeaux, comte de Saint-Florentin, who was then Secretary of State of the Maison du Roi, who ceded it in 1764 to his mistress, Marie-Madeleine de Cusacque the Countess of Langeac (1725–1778). She then sold it in 1772 to the Comte d'Artois, who later became King Charles X, Louis XVI's younger brother.

Planning approval via letters patent was given on 29 November 1777, which allowed the prince to cut through land from the Rue d'Angoulême with a width of 30 feet (9.1 m), and to name it in honour of his eldest son Louis Antoine, Duke of Angoulême (1775–1844). New letters patent of 4 April 1778 approved the opening of the Rue de Ponthieu, Rue Neuve-de-Berri (current Rue de Berri), Rue Neuve-de-Poitiers (current Rue d'Artois) and Rue d'Angoulême-Saint-Honoré. An alignment report was drawn up by the office of the City of Paris on 24 November 1778, allowing a ministerial decision to be taken on 6 Nivôse XII (27 December 1803), which set the width of the street to 10 metres (33 ft).

During the French Revolution and until 1815, the street bore the name Rue de l'Union (Union Street). It then resumed its original name until 1830, when it became Rue de la Charte (Charter Street). It then underwent a quick succession of names, becoming Rue Lapeyrouse, Rue d'Angoulême once again (1852), Rue de Morny (1863), Rue de la Commune (1871), Rue Mac-Mahon and finally Rue Pierre-Charron in 1871. The area between the Place Saint-Augustin and the Place Chand-Goyon was called Rue de la Pépinière until 1868, and then Rue Abattucci.

The street took its current name in 1879, throughout its length, in honour of Étienne de La Boétie (1530–1563), friend moralist of Michel de Montaigne.

== Notable buildings ==
Number	Current usage	History	Image
3	Offices, including a branch of HSBC bank	Home of couturier Charles Frederick Worth.	
8		Confectioner Latinville. Remembered in the memoirs of Céleste Albaret, the housekeeper of Marcel Proust, and in Nana by Émile Zola.	
9		Home of Anglo-American writer Henry James.	
21		Art gallery of Georges Wildenstein, and later Paul Rosenberg (1881–1959).	
23		Home and workshop of artist Pablo Picasso, from 1918 to 1940. Rented for him and paid for by Paul Rosenberg.	
26		Home of Jacques Chabannes (1900–1994) from 1951 to 1993.	
27		Home of the brothers Émile and Vincent Isola, directors of the Théâtre de la Gaîté-Lyrique.	
28	Bulgarian cultural space, inaugurated on 7 October 2004. Includes a plaque commemorating Christo Botev.		
33	Marcel Bernheim Gallery		
34	Private		
41		Home of writer Eugène Sue.	
42	Local office of Jones Lang LaSalle		
45–47	Salle Gaveau, a 1020-seat concert hall built in 1905–06 by the architect Jacques Hermant, for the piano manufacturer Gaveau		
48	National Federation of Credit Agricole		
51	La Poste - main post office for the 8th arrondissement		
54–56	Corporate headquarters of Sanofi S.A.	Former office of Alcatel-Lucent S.A.	
55	Pépinière La Boétie	Former headquarters of the Union for a Popular Movement (UMP), 2002 to 2011.	
57	Wildenstein Institute	Built in 1776 by architect Charles De Wailly for himself. Purchased in 1905 by Nathan Wildenstein (1852–1934), who had it revised by architect Walter-André Destailleur. Home to the Wildenstein Institute since 2011.	
58		Paris branch office of the Central Intelligence Agency, 1948 to 2003.	
59	Gallery Denise Valtat		
66		Home of Émile Fabre (1869–1955).	
88	Saint-Philippe-du-Roule Court		
101	Baroche Café Brasserie		
103		Home of Lucien Napoleon Bonaparte-Wyse (1844–1909), who died in this building. Later home of Eugène Lefèvre-Pontalis.	
106–8	Offices	Former location of the Central téléphonique Elysées.	
109	Complex of banks and shops built in 1929–31 by architect André Arfvidson for the National City Bank of America	Built in 1777–78 by architect Jean-Baptiste Le Boursier as the Hôtel Thiroux de Montsauge for financier Thiroux de Montsauge. Renamed the Hôtel de Massa. Moved stone-by-stone in 1928 and reassembled at no. 38, rue du Faubourg-Saint-Jacques.	
122		Former home of Sadi Carnot (1837–1894), who lived here from 1882 before becoming President of the French Republic in 1887. Later home to composer Alfred Bruneau (1857–1934) from 1910.	
