= Rédené =

Rédené Redene
- Commune
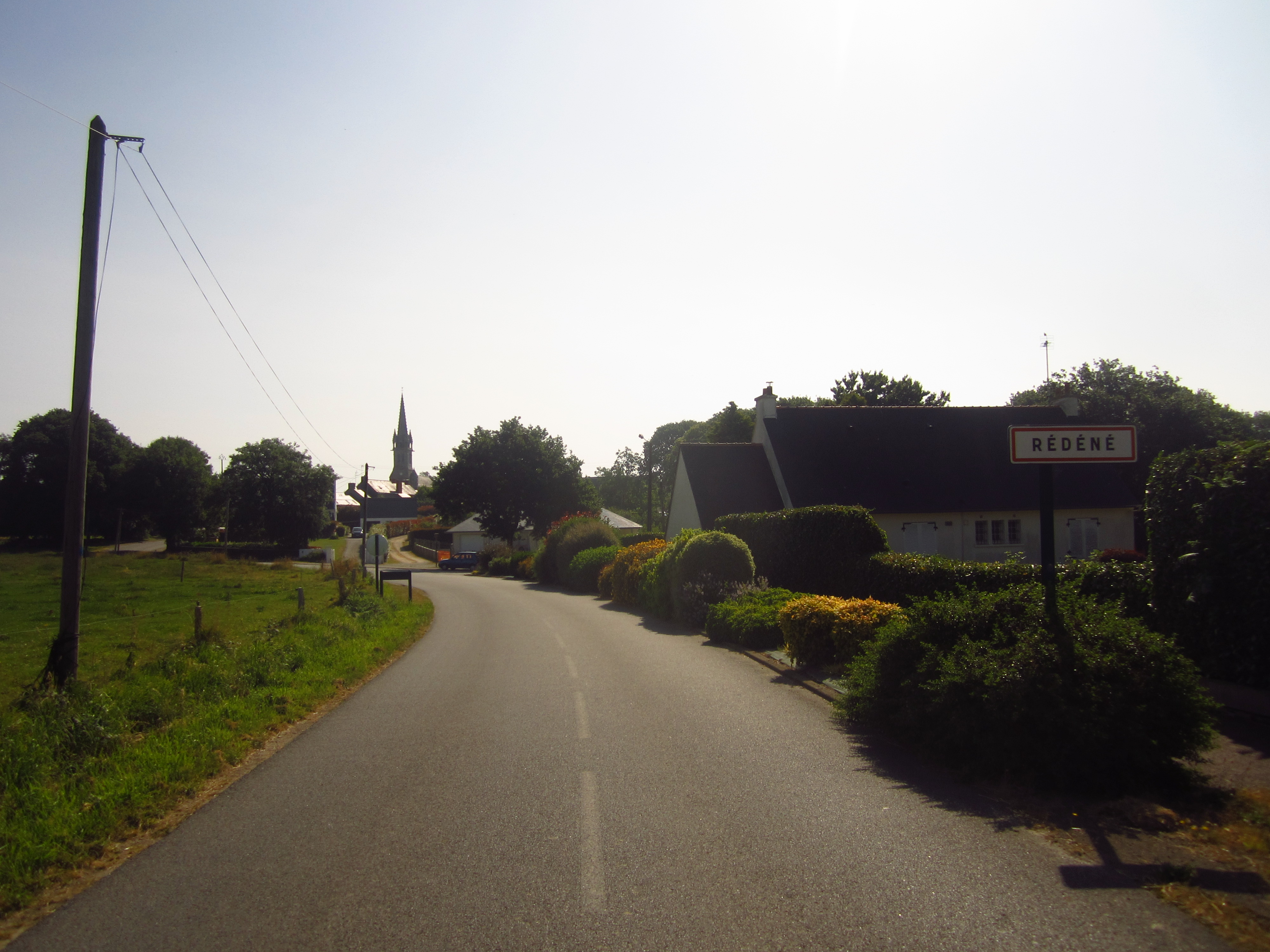
- The road into Rédené
- Location of Rédené
- Location within France Location within Brittany
- Coordinates: 47°51′38″N 3°27′37″W
- Country: France
- Region: Brittany
- Department: Finistère
- Arrondissement: Quimper
- Canton: Quimperlé
- Intercommunality: CA Quimperlé Communauté

Government
  - Mayor (2020–2026): Yves Bernicot
- Area^{1}: 24.49 km^{2} (9.46 sq mi)
- Highest elevation: 81 m (266 ft)
- Lowest elevation: 4 m (13 ft)
- Population (2023): 3,043
  - Density: 124.3/km^{2} (321.8/sq mi)
- Time zone: UTC+01:00 (CET)
  - Summer (DST): UTC+02:00 (CEST)
- INSEE/Postal code: 29234 /29300
- ^{1} French Land Register data, which excludes lakes, ponds, glaciers > 1 km^{2} (0.386 sq mi or 247 acres) and river estuaries.

Rédené (French pronunciation: [ʁedene]; Breton: Redene) is a commune in the Finistère department of Brittany in north-western France. The poet Gérard Le Gouic winner of the 1973 Prix Breizh and the 1980 Prix Antonin-Artaud was born in Rédené.

== Population ==
Inhabitants of Rédené are called in French Rédénois.

Historical population

Year	Pop.	±% p.a.
1793	2,600	—
1800	2,730	+0.70%
1806	1,051	−14.71%
1821	1,182	+0.79%
1831	1,295	+0.92%
1836	1,285	−0.15%
1841	1,289	+0.06%
1846	1,339	+0.76%
1851	1,402	+0.92%
1856	1,308	−1.38%
1861	1,338	+0.45%
1866	1,369	+0.46%
1872	1,369	+0.00%
1876	1,479	+1.95%
1881	1,494	+0.20%
1886	1,571	+1.01%
1891	1,558	−0.17%
1896	1,545	−0.17%
1901	1,547	+0.03%

Year	Pop.	±% p.a.
1906	1,601	+0.69%
1911	1,635	+0.42%
1921	1,606	−0.18%
1926	1,559	−0.59%
1931	1,515	−0.57%
1936	1,493	−0.29%
1946	1,431	−0.42%
1954	1,158	−2.61%
1962	1,034	−1.41%
1968	1,053	+0.30%
1975	1,759	+7.61%
1982	2,112	+2.65%
1990	2,383	+1.52%
1999	2,313	−0.33%
2007	2,684	+1.88%
2012	2,891	+1.50%
2017	2,908	+0.12%
2023	3,043	+0.76%

Source: EHESS and INSEE (1968-2023)

== Map ==
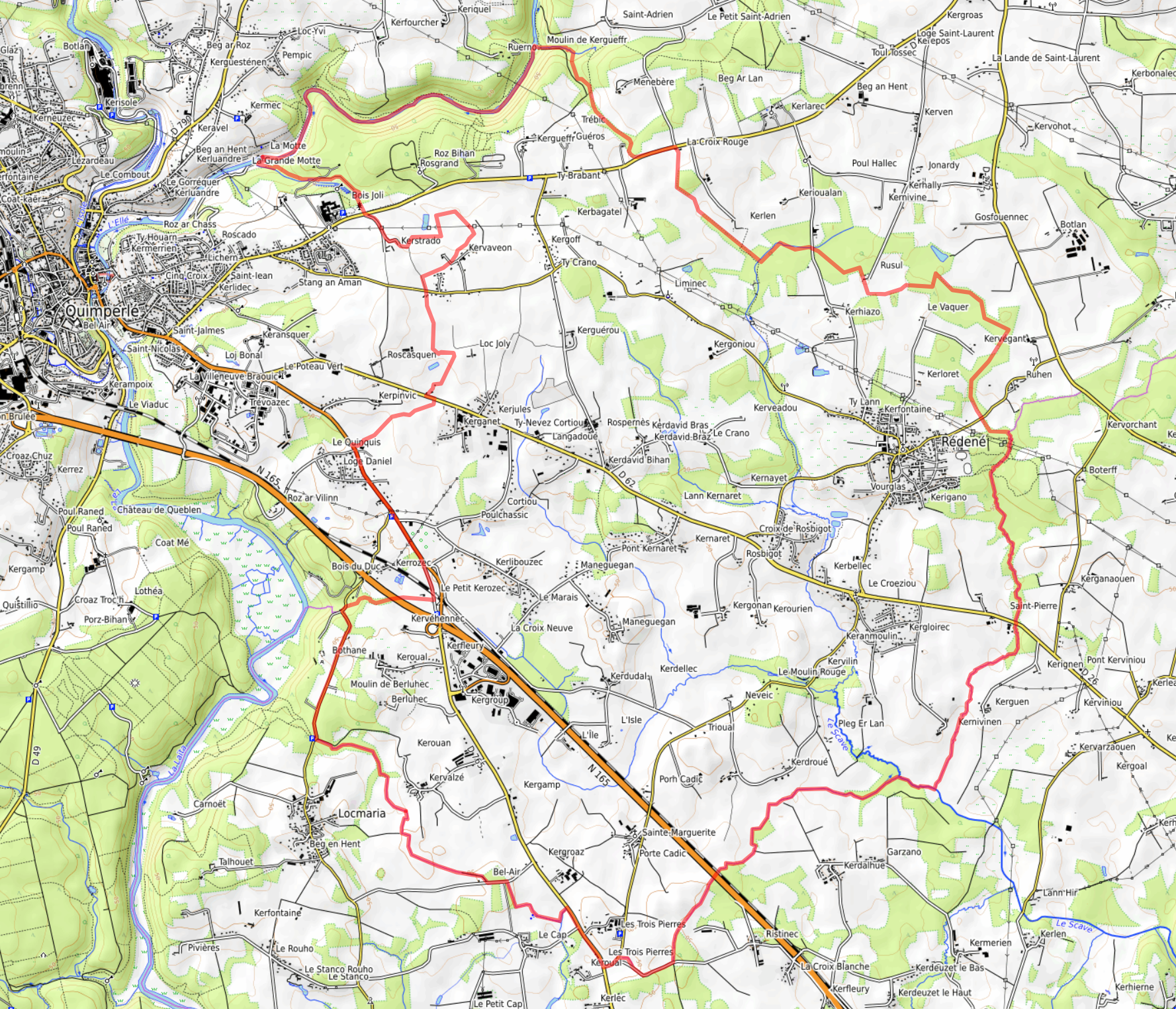
Topographic map

== Geography ==
The village centre is located 7 km (4.3 mi) east of Quimperlé. Historically, the village belongs to Vannetais. The Rosgrand wood is a natural site situated in the north of the commune. It offers nice views of the river Ellé.

== See also ==
- Communes of the Finistère department
- Entry on sculptor of local war memorial Jean Joncourt
