= Paysan =

Paysan is the French word for "peasant". It may refer to:

- Catherine Paysan, writer
- Paisan, Italian film
