= Martine Queffélec =

French mathematician

Martine Queffélec (née Joublin; born 1949) is a French mathematician associated with the University of Lille and known for her research on continued fractions, Diophantine approximation, combinatorics on words, L-systems, and related topics in dynamical systems.

== Education and career ==
Queffélec defended her doctoral dissertation in 1984. By 1987, she was working at the Université Sorbonne Paris Nord; she moved to the Lille University of Science and Technology in 1993.

== Books ==
Queffélec is the author of the book Substitution Dynamical Systems – Spectral Analysis (Springer, Lecture Notes in Mathematics 1294, 1987; 2nd ed., 2010). She is the co-author, with Hervé Queffélec, of Diophantine Approximation and Dirichlet Series (Harish-Chandra Research Institute Lecture Notes 2, 2013).

== Recognition ==
In 2011, the Lille University of Science and Technology hosted a conference "Analyse 2011" in honor of both Martine and Hervé Queffélec.

== Personal life and family ==
Queffélec's husband, mathematician Hervé Queffélec, is a son of French writer Henri Queffélec (1910–1992), and the brother of pianist Anne Queffélec and novelist Yann Queffélec.
