= Dodik Jégou =

French ceramist, painter and poet (1934–2024)

- Born: Marie-Charlotte Le Berre; 14 May 1934; Quimper, France
- Died: 2 April 2024 (aged 89); Saint-Malo, France
- Education: École régionale des beaux-arts de Quimper
- Occupations: Ceramist; Painter; Poet

Marie-Charlotte Le Berre (14 May 1934 – 2 April 2024), better known by her pen name Dodik Jégou, was a French ceramicist, painter and poet.

Jégou founded and directed the Maison internationale des poètes et des écrivains.

== Biography ==
Born in Quimper on 14 May 1934, Jégou grew up in a family of spinners from the Bigouden region. Her great-grandparents invented the Bigouden picot, which was derived from the Irish picot. Her ancestors embroidered for the likes of the Emperor of Russia. She was the eldest child of Marc Le Berre, who owned the store À la Ville d'Ys in Quimper. A Breton regionalist, he was a member of the Seiz Breur movement and created the kabic. He would later buy old pieces from Coco Chanel. Her mother, Anne-Marie Kerloc'h, taught her how to be a housewife. In her father's store, she met numerous artists being exhibited, including René-Yves Creston, Géo-Fourrier, Robert Micheau-Vernez, and René Quillivic. Her father told her the tales of François-Marie Luzel, which would inspire her work.

Impassioned with the arts, she entered the École régionale des beaux-arts de Quimper. During her studies, she frequented the Faïencerie Keraluc, where she gathered inspiration for her works. She was a student of Jos Le Corre and met Gwen Jégou, whom she married in 1955. The couple had two children: Tugdual (1956–2018) and Gaïde (1957–2016). Dodik and Gwen opened a ceramics shop in Saint-Malo in 1956, on Place de la Poissonnerie.

In 1979, Jégou created Rencontres chez Gwen et Dodik with her husband, which was also known as Le Petit Théâtre de Gwen et Dodik, which hosted artists, poets, writers, singers, and more. They brought in the likes of Pêr-Jakez Helias, Youenn Gwernig, Irène Frain, Glenmor, Michel Le Bris, and performers from the Étonnants Voyageurs. In 1981, she organized the Rencontres Poetiques de Bretagne, also known as the Rencontres poétiques internationales de Bretagne, of which she became director in 1982. In 1984, she participated in a global congress of poets in Marrakesh, led by Léopold Sédar Senghor. In 1986, she hosted Senghor, Pêr-Jakez Helias, and Gérard Le Gouic at Mont-Saint-Michel. For her, "culture only exists as an exchange, a link, an opening to the world".

In 1990, with the help of the municipality of Saint-Malo, she opened the Maison internationale des poètes et des écrivains, inaugurated by Federico Mayor Zaragoza, Director-General of UNESCO, as well as Mayor René Couanau, 1989 Nobel Prize in Literature winner Camilo José Cela, and Édouard Maunick. She directed the house until August 2014, when it was led by Pascal Verdeau, although she maintained de facto leadership. She was also a co-founder and member of the Maison des métiers d'art français and devoted time in 2008 to saving frescos in association with the Amis du peintre Geoffroy Dauvergne.

Dodik Jégou died in Saint-Malo on 2 April 2024, at the age of 89.

== Works ==
- Nine ceramic frescos in Ruhr
- La Conception de Merlin
- La Légende de la ville d'Ys
- Le Barzaz Breizh
- Les Contes de Luzel

=== Illustrations ===
- The Wonderful Adventures of Nils by Selma Lagerlöf
- Les contes de Luzel by Pêr-Jakez Helias
- Comment le renard Poil-Roux fut battu à la course par Ventre-à-Terre, l'escargot by Pêr-Jakez Helias
- Angèle by Angèle Vannier
- Le Livre d'Angèle by Angèle Vannier

=== Stamps ===
- Barzaz Breiz

=== Publications ===
- Entretien avec Mario Vargas Llosa (2003)

== Expositions ==
- 17 frescos at the Parlement of Rennes (1981)
- 40 frescos and ceramic pieces at the UNESCO Headquarters (1985)
- Bibliothèque municipale de Rennes (1989)
- Inauguration de la Maison des légendes (2001)
- Église Saint-Sauveur de Saint-Malo (2021–2022)
- Various exhibitions in Barcelona, Brussels, Cannes, Deauville, Florence, Frankfurt, London, Lyon, Munich, Paris, Prague, Thessaloniki, Strasbourg, and Stuttgart

== Distinctions ==
- Knight of the Ordre des Palmes académiques
- Order of the Ermine (1997)
- Goursez Vreizh
- Medal of the Ville de Saint-Malo (2021)
