= Prix de la langue française =

The Prix de la langue française is chronologically the first grand prix of the literary season in France.

Established in 1986 by the city of Brive-la-Gaillarde in the department of Corrèze, this prize rewards the work of a personality of the literary, artistic or scientific world, which has contributed significantly, through the style of his/her works or his/her action to illustrate the quality and beauty of the French language. It is presented annually at the opening of the Foire du livre de Brive-la-Gaillarde.

The laureate wins 10,000 euros.

== Jury ==
The jury of the award, with a rotating presidency, is composed of members of the Académie française, the Académie Goncourt and other writers.

== Laureates ==
- 1986: Jean Tardieu
- 1987: Jacqueline de Romilly
- 1988: André Lichnerowicz
- 1989: Michel Jobert
- 1990: Yves Berger
- 1991: Pascal Quignard
- 1992: Alain Bosquet
- 1993: Alain Rey
- 1994: Hector Bianciotti
- 1995: not awarded
- 1996: René de Obaldia
- 1997: François Weyergans
- 1998: Marcel Schneider
- 1999: Jacques Chessex
- 2000: Bernard Pivot
- 2001: Philippe Beaussant
- 2002: Michel Chaillou
- 2003: Dominique de Villepin
- 2004: Gilles Lapouge
- 2005: Jean-Pierre de Beaumarchais
- 2006: Christiane Singer
- 2007: Pierre Assouline
- 2008: Annie Ernaux
- 2009: Jean-Paul Kauffmann
- 2010: Alain Veinstein
- 2011: Emmanuel Carrère
- 2012: Vassilis Alexakis
- 2013: Jean Rolin
- 2014: Hélène Cixous
- 2015: Mona Ozouf
- 2016 : Philippe Forest
- 2017 : Jean-Luc Coatalem
- 2018 : Pierre Guyotat
- 2019 : Louis-Philippe Dalembert
- 2021 : Pierre Bergounioux
- 2022 : Nathacha Appanah
- 2023 : Ananda Devi
