= Polard =

Polard may refer to:

- Polard, West Virginia, American unincorporated community
- Maurice Polard (born 1932), French novelist and short story writer

== See also ==
- Pollard (disambiguation)
