= Marcel Schneider =

Marcel Schneider may refer to:

- Marcel Schneider (golfer) (born 1990), German golfer
- Marcel Schneider (writer) (1913–2009), French writer
