= Gérard Le Gouic =

French poet and writer (born 1936)

Gérard Le Gouic (born 11 June 1936, in Rédené) is a French poet and writer.

== Biography ==
Gérard Le Gouic was baptized in September 1936 in the church of Rédené (Finistère). His parents resided in the 14th arrondissement of Paris. He lived there until his departure for Africa. He met the poet Maurice Fombeure, then professor at the Collège Lavoisier in Paris. He spent his childhood holiday in Brittany, home of his parents.

During his military service in Algeria, he became friends with poet Max Alhau and painter Jacques Rouquier.

From 1959 to 1969, he lived in Africa. His activities in trade will lead him to Fort Lamy in Chad (where he met Henri Queffélec and with whom he became friends) to Pointe-Noire in Congo at Douala in Cameroon and Bangui, Central African Republic. He regularly returned to spend his holidays in Brittany.

On his return to Brittany in 1969, he occupied himself for thirty years with a souvenir shop in Quimper. The sign he chose, "Telen Arvor" ("Harp of Armor") is the title of a collection of the poet Auguste Brizeux and will also be the name he will choose for his own publishing house.

== Distinctions ==
- Prix de poésie de l'Académie de Bretagne et des Pays de la Loire in 2008
- Prix Antonin-Artaud in 1980 for Géographie du fleuve (Telen Arvor)
- Prix Alfred de Musset of the Société des gens de lettres in 1977 for Poème de l'île et du sel
- Prix Breizh in 1973 for Poèmes de mon vivant

== Publications ==
=== Poetry ===
- 2015: Pâques, éditions La Porte
- 2014: Comment allez-vous, éditions La Porte
- 2012: Une heure chaque jour, éditions Écrits des Forges
- 2011: Les haïkus du carnet, éditions Telen Arvor
- 2011: Des arbres, des oiseaux, du ciel, éditions Sac à mots
- 2010: Pense Bêtes..., éditions Tugdual, Cancale, livre d'artiste, illustration by Gwen Jégou
- 2010: Célébration des larmes, éditions Telen Arvor
- 2007: Tout amour est dernier amour, éditions Coop Breizh
- 2006: La belle lumière, éditions Telen Arvor
- 2006: Nous, une, éditions La Part Commune
- 2004: Contes et fables du moulin des chiens, éditions Telen Arvor
- 2001: Attrape-moi aussi un poète, éditions Coop Breizh, for children
- 2001: Hasards de mer - Autres incertitudes, Le Temps des Cerises
- 1999: Cafés et autres lieux d'amour, éditions Telen Arvor
- 1996: Les sentiments obscurs, éd. Coop Breizh
- 1996: Le Marcheur de rêve, coédition Écrits des Forges - Le Dé Bleu
- 1995: Oiseaux, éditions Les Dits du Pont
- 1992: Trois poèmes pour trois âges de l'eau, éditions Telen Arvor
- 1991: Cadastre intime du pommier, éditions du Dossen
- 1991: Poésie with Jean Failler, Buhez Ar Vro Vigoudenn
- 1985: Les bateaux en bouteille, éditions Telen Arvor
- 1983: Le Marais et les jours, éditions Telen Arvor
- 1982: Feuillus océans, éditions du P.A.V.E
- 1981: Fermé pour cause de poésie, éditions Picollec, réédition Écrits des Forges
- 1980: Autoportrait en noir et bleu II, Éditions Rougerie
- 1979: Géographie du fleuve, éditions Telen Arvor
- 1977:Poème de l'île et du sel, éditions Telen Arvor. Translated into:
  - English Song of salt and island, by Stanley J. Collier, Éditions du Liogan
  - German Insel und salz gedicht, by Fritz Werf, Atelier Verlag Andernach
  - Briton Barzoneg an enezenn hag an holen, by Naïg Rozmor, ed. Brud Nevez
- 1977: Autoportrait en noir et bleu, Rougerie
- 1975: L'Ossuaire de sable, éditions Telen Arvor
- 1973: Poèmes de mon vivant, selfedition, Prix Bretagne 1973
- 1971: De mon vivant, Caractères
- 1968: L'Âge de l'avenir, Guy Chambelland
- 1966:Les Bruits anciens, Chambelland
- 1961: Dieu-le-douze, Grassin
- 1960: À la fonte des blés, Grassin
- 1958: Que la mer vienne, José Millias-Martin

=== Novels, narratives, short stories, diaries ===
- 2016: Le pont suspendu, dans l'anthologie Longères, bombardes et ressacs, Stéphane Batigne Éditeur
- 2014: Les Pays chauds, éditions des Montagnes Noires
- 2014: Le Voyage de Clara, éditions des Montagnes Noires
- 213: Le Week-end à Roscoff, éditions des Montagnes Noires
- 2012: Nous avons la douleur de vous faire part, éditions des Montagnes Noires
- 2010: Quand il y a un mort à la fin, moi j'adore, Ed. Les Chemins Bleus
- 2009: La Place Bouchaballe, éditions Telen Arvor
- 2007: À l'abri de la tempête, éditions La Part Commune
- 2005: Je ne suis pas un monstre, éditions La Part Commune
- 2003: Pendant l'agonie, la vente continue, éditions Telen Arvor
- 2002: Henri Thomas et la Bretagne, éditions Blanc Silex
- 2001: Une odeur d'amour, éditions Coop Breizh
- 1997: Le Grand Pays, éditions Telen Arvor
- 1994: Journal de Kermadeoua, éditions Liogan
- 1994: Deux années à digitales, éditions Blanc Silex
- 1987: Journal de ma boutique, éditions Telen Arvor

== Bibliography ==
- 1987: Gérard Le Gouic ou la Bretagne universelle, Jean Wagner, Éditions Du Rouerge, series "Visages de ce temps"
- 1977:Poésie présente : six poètes de Bretagne (Saint-Pol-Roux and Guy Faucher, Anne Teyssieras, Georges Drano, Gérard Le Gouic, Denis Rigal), Éd. Rougerie
