= Jégou =

Jégou is a French surname. Notable people with the surname include:

- Dodik Jégou (born 1934), French painter
- Jean-Jacques Jégou (born 1945), French politician
- Lilian Jégou (born 1976), French cyclist
