= Frédérick Tristan =

French writer (1931–2022)

- Born: Jean-Paul Frédéric Tristan Baron; 11 June 1931; Sedan, France
- Died: 2 March 2022 (aged 90); Dreux, France

Jean-Paul Frédéric Tristan Baron (11 June 1931 – 2 March 2022) was a French writer.

== Biography ==
Tristan was born in Sedan, Ardennes, France, on 11 June 1931. He was sent on a mission to Laos, North Vietnam, South Vietnam and China (1964–1986).

In 2000, he explained his work in a series of interviews with the critic Jean-Luc Moreau.

In 1952, he participated in research conducted by Joel Picton. From 1983 to 2001 he was professor of early Christian and Renaissance iconography at ICART (Paris). Tristan is one of the authors named in Jean-Luc Moreau's 1992 manifesto and anthology La Nouvelle Fiction, alongside Hubert Haddad, Georges-Olivier Châteaureynaud, François Coupry, Jean Levy, Patrick Carré, and Marc Petit. All seven founding members of this literary movement share a literary heritage of German Romanticism, the English Gothic novel, speculative philosophy, surrealism, spiritualism and the oriental tale to explore Romantic themes such as the soul, fate, the world of dreams, myth and invisible realms.

All of his archives (manuscripts, books published and translated, audio and visual documentation, reviews) are available at IMEC.

Tristan was married to Marie-France Tristan, a specialist on poet Giambattista Marino. He died in France, on 2 March 2022, at the age of 90.

== Awards ==
- 1983 Prix Goncourt, for Les Égarés
- 2000 Grand Prize for lifetime achievement Société des gens de lettres

== Works ==
- Les Égarés, éditions Fayard (Paris)
- Naissance d'un spectre, éditions Fayard (Paris)
- Le Singe égal du ciel, éditions Fayard (Paris)
- La Geste serpentine, éditions Fayard (Paris)
- Balthasar Kober, éditions Fayard (Paris)
- Stéphanie Phanistée, éditions Fayard (Paris)
- Dieu, éditions Fayard (Paris)
- l'Univers et Madame Berthe, éditions Fayard (Paris)
- Les Obsèques prodigieuses d'Abraham Radjec, éditions Fayard (Paris)
- Tao le haut voyage, éditions Fayard (Paris)
- L'Énigme du Vatican, éditions Fayard (Paris)
- Monsieur l'Enfant et le cercle des bavards, éditions Fayard (Paris)
- Dernières nouvelles de l'Au-delà, éditions Fayard (Paris)
- Le Chaudron chinois, éditions Fayard (Paris)
- Christos, enquête sur l'impossible, éditions Fayard (Paris)
- L'Infini singulier (qui décrit l’enfance de Adrien Salvat, personage récurrent de l’auteur)

=== Poetry ===
- L’Ostiaque
- L’Anthrope, 1951-1953 (Nouveau Commerce)
- Passage de l'ombre (Recherches graphiques)
- Encres et écritures (2010). La Finestra

=== Essays ===
- Les Premières Images chrétiennes: du symbole à l'icône
- Les Sociétés secrètes chinoises
- Le Monde à l'envers, l'Œil d'Hermès
- Anagramme du vide
- Don Juan le révolté
