= Catherine Paysan =

French writer (1926–2020)

Annie Hausen
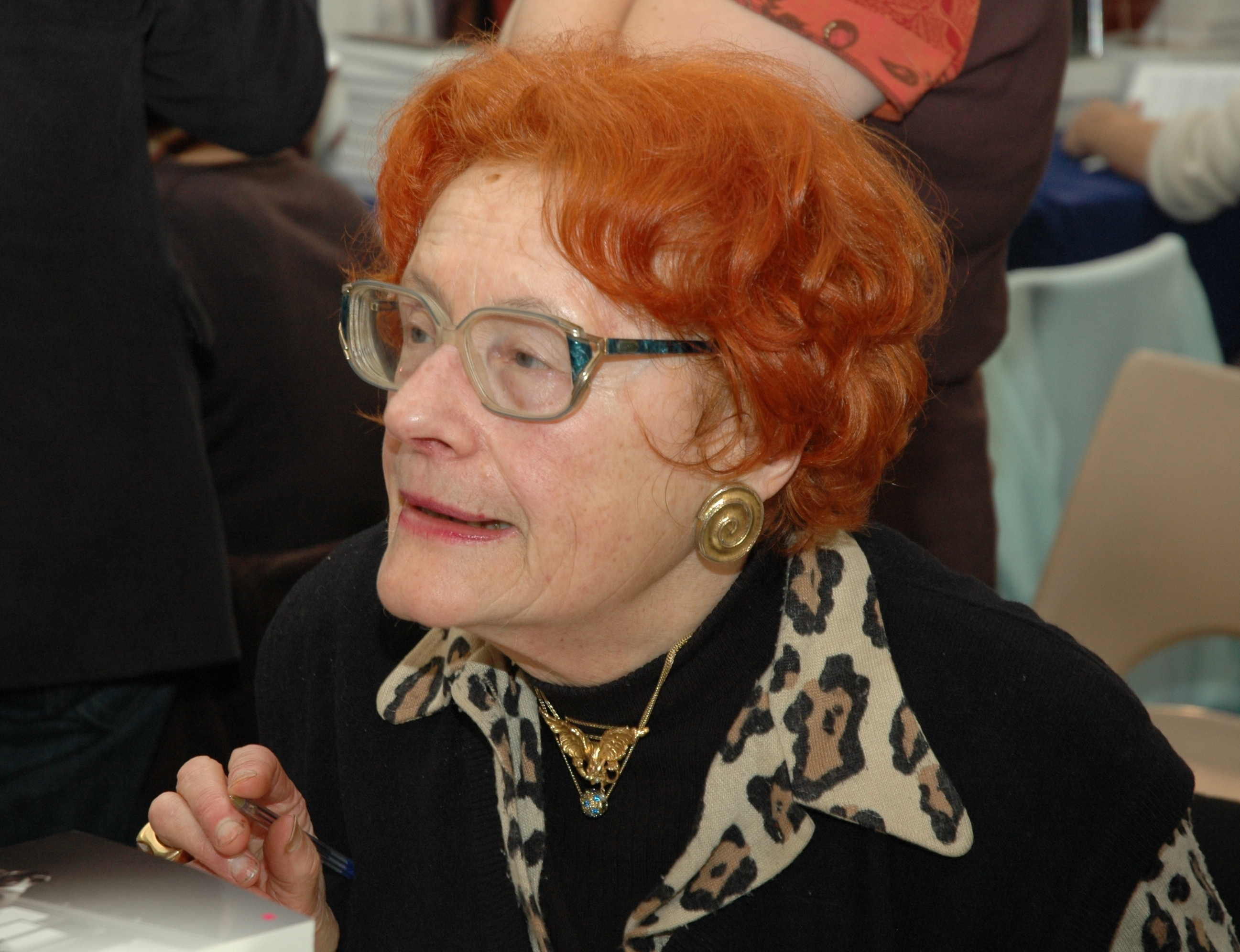
- Born: Annie Roulette; 4 August 1926; Aulaines, Sarthe, France
- Died: 22 April 2020 (aged 93); Le Mans, France
- Writing career
- Pen name: Catherine Paysan
- Genres: novel, play, short story, poetry

Annie Hausen (4 August 1926 – 22 April 2020), known by her pen name Catherine Paysan, was a French writer. She won the Grand prix de littérature de la SGDL for her lifetime's writing.

The daughter of Auguste and Marthe Roulette, she was born Annie Roulette in Aulaines in the Sarthe department of France. She attended a lycée for girls in Le Mans from 1938 to 1939 and then the boys' lycée (now the Lycée Montesquieu) from 1939 to 1945 while the girls' school was being used as a hospital. She taught at a collège in Paris, where she met her future husband, a Hungarian; after her marriage, she retired from teaching and returned to her native village.

She published several novels, five autobiographical works, two collections of poetry and two plays, and adapted several of her works for film. In 1977, she received the Grand prix de littérature de la SGDL for the whole of her work.

Paysan was named an Officier of the Legion of Honour in 2011. She was also named a Knight in the French National Order of Merit.

== Selected works ==
- Écrit pour l'âme des cavaliers, poetry (1956)
- Nous autres les Sanchez, novel (1961), received the Grand prix du Roman from the Société des gens de lettres
- Histoire d'une salamandre, novel (1963)
- Les Faiseurs de chance, stories (1963)
- Je m’appelle Jéricho, novel (1964)
- Les Feux de la Chandeleur, novel (1966), received the Prix des libraires de France, adapted for film as Hearth Fires (English title)
- Le Nègre de Sables, novel (1968)
- Les Oiseaux migrateurs, play (1969)
- Comme l'or d'un anneau, autobiographical novel (1971)
- L’Empire du taureau, novel (1974)
- Pour le plaisir, autobiographical novel (1976)
- Le Clown de la rue Montorgeuil (1978)
- Dame suisse sur un canapé de reps vert, novel (1981)
- Le Rendez-vous de Strasbourg, novel (1984)
- La Colline d'en face, autobiographical novel (1987)
- 52 poèmes pour une année, poetry (1989)
- La Route vers la fiancée, novel (1992)
- Les Désarmés, stories (2000), received the Prix Goncourt de la Nouvelle
- La Prière parallèle, novel (2003)
- L’amour là-bas en Allemagne, autobiographical novel (2006)
