= Jules Bertaut =

French writer, historian and lecturer

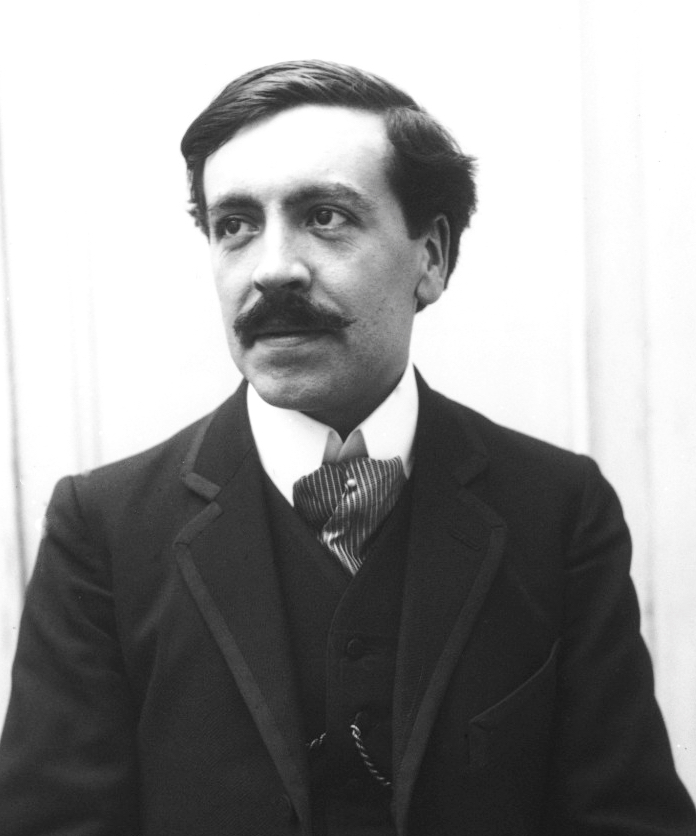
- Born: 28 March 1877; Bourges, France
- Died: 7 October 1959 (aged 82); Villeneuve-Loubet (Alpes-Maritimes), France
- Occupations: Writer; Historian; Lecturer

Jules Bertaut (28 March 1877 – 7 October 1959) was a French writer, historian and lecturer.

In 1959, he was awarded the grand prix de littérature de la SGDL for his work.

== Works ==
Selected works:

- 1900: Secrets d'un siècle, Amiot
- 1904: Marcel Prévost, Edward Sansot
- 1906: Figures contemporaines : chroniqueurs et polémistes..., E. Sansot
- 1908: Balzac anecdotique, E. Sansot
- 1909: La littérature féminine d'aujourd'hui, Librairie des annules
- 1910: La jeune fille dans la littérature française, L. Michaud
- 1912: Victor Hugo, Voltaire, Louis Michaud
- 1912: Virilités: maximes et pensées, E. Sansot. Translated as "Napoleon In His Own Words" (1916)
- 1913: L'Italie vue par les français, Prix Montyon of the Académie française
- 1918: Ce qu'était la province française avant la guerre..., La Renaissance du livre
- 1919: Le Paris d'avant-guerre, La Renaissance du livre
- 1919: Louis Barthou, E. Sansot
- 1920: Le Roman nouveau, Renaissance du Livre
- 1921: Une amitié romantique : George Sand et François Rollinat, Renaissance du livre
- 1924: Le Boulevard, Flammarion
- 1924: Henry Bordeaux, son œuvre Éditions de la Nouvelle revue critique
- 1927: Villégiatures romantiques, Le Goupy
- 1927: Les belles nuits de Paris, E. Flammarion
- 1928: Égéries du XVIIIe : madame Suard, madame Delille, madame Helvétius, madame Diderot, mademoiselle Quinault, Plon
- 1928: Le père Goriot de Balzac, E. Malfère
- 1930: Le Théâtre-Libre et son influence sur le théâtre français contemporain, Institut français en Portugal
- 1931: L'opinion et les mœurs. La Troisième République de 1870 à nos jours, Les Éditions de France
- 1933: La Bourse anecdotique et pittoresque, Les Éditions de France
- 1936: Paris, 1870-1935, Eyre and Spottiswoode
- 1936: Le roi bourgeois (Louis-Philippe intime), Éditions Grasset
- 1937: 1848 et la seconde république, A. Fayard
- 1939: Napoléon III secret, B. Grasset
- 1941: Madame de Genlis, B. Grasset
- 1943: La vie à Paris sous le Premier Empire, Éditions Balzac
- 1943: Le retour à la monarchie, 1815-1848, Fayard
- 1945: Talleyrand, H. Lardanchet
- 1946: Madame Tallien, Fayard
- 1947: Madame Récamier, Grasset
- 1947: Visages romantiques, J. Ferenczi
- 1948: Les belles émigrés, Flammarion
- 1949: Napoléon I aux Tuileries, Hachette
- 1949: Le faubourg Saint-Germain sous l'Empire et la Restauration, Éditions Tallandier
- 1949: La Duchesse d'Abrantès, Flammarion
- 1950: La vie privée de Balzac, Hachette
- 1951: Paris à travers les âges, Hachette
- 1951: Napoléon ignoré, SFELT
- 1952: La vie privée de Chateaubriand, Hachette
- 1952: Les parisiens sous la révolution, Club international du livre
- 1953: Côte d'Azur, Hachette
- 1954: Le roi Jérôme, Flammarion
- 1954: Les dessous de la finance, Tallandier
- 1954: La vie littéraire en France au XVIIIe siècle, Tallandier
- 1955: Amoureuses et femmes galantes, Les Éditions de Lyon
- 1956: L'Impératrice Eugénie et son temps, Bibliothèque Amiot-Dumont
- 1957: Secrets d'un siècle, P. Amiot
- 1959: Les dessous de la troisième (république), Tallandier
- 1959: La reine Hortense, Bloud & Gay
