= Mona Ozouf =

French historian and philosopher (born 1931)

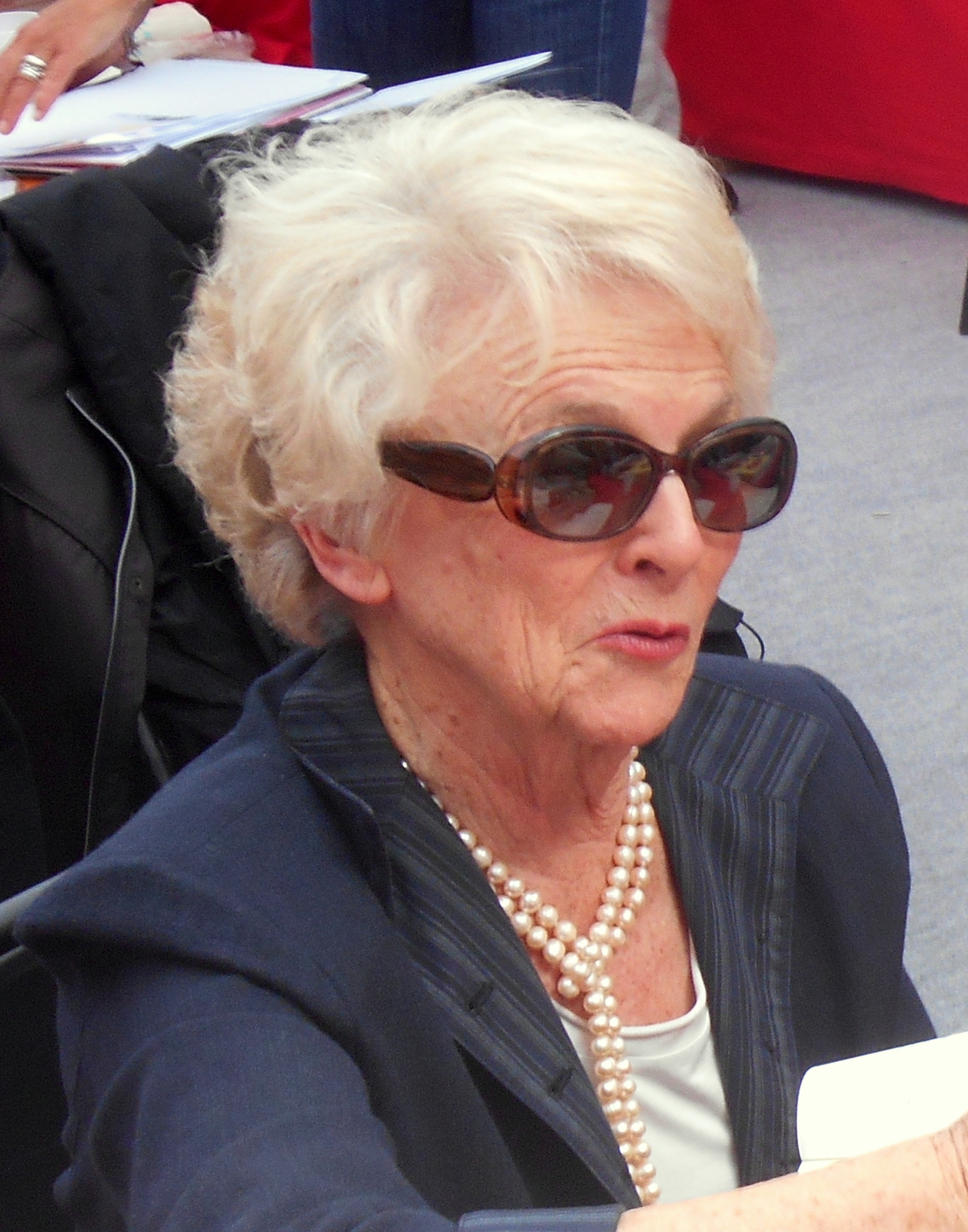
- Mona Ozouf in 2014
- Born: 24 February 1931 (age 95); Lannilis, Finistère, France
- Education: École normale supérieure de jeunes filles
- Occupations: Philosopher; Historian
- Spouse: Jacques Ozouf

Mona Ozouf (born Mona Annig Sohier 24 February 1931) is a French historian and philosopher. Born into a family of schoolteachers keen on preserving the language and the culture of Brittany, she graduated as a teacher of philosophy from the École normale supérieure de jeunes filles.

After teaching philosophy, she joined the CNRS as a historian. Her research and writings centre on the French Revolution and the French secular education system. Notable publications include L'École, l'Église et la République, 1871–1914 (1963) and La fête révolutionnaire, 1789–1799 (1976), the latter of which was published in English as Festivals and the French Revolution (1988).

== Biography ==
Born Mona Annig Sohier on 24 February 1931 at Lannilis, Finistère, she is the daughter of the schoolteachers Yann Sohier (1901–1935) and Anne Le Den (1905–1996). In 1955, she married the historian Jacques Ozouf (1928–2006). After her father died when she was four years old, she was brought up by her mother and grandmother. She was rarely allowed outside the school in which her mother was headmistress except for regular visits to the village church with her grandmother. As a result, she became fascinated by literature and read all the books that she could find.

After attending high school in Saint-Brieuc, she studied philosophy at the École Normale Supérieure from 1952. Like many of her fellow students, she joined the French Communist Party but left four years later after the repression of the Hungarian Revolution of 1956 and decided not to become involved in politics. She taught philosophy for a period but then turned to history after she met a group of historians, Denis Richet, Emmanuel Le Roy Ladurie and François Furet, at the National Library of France. She worked with them to produce the Dictionnaire critique de la Révolution française, which was published in English in 1988 as A Critical Dictionary of the French Revolution. With her husband, she developed La République des instituteurs, which was published in 1989.

Becoming a recognized scholar of the French Revolution, she published her seminal work, La fête révolutionnaire, 1789–1799, in 1976. The English translation, Festivals and the French Revolution, was published in 1988. Her analysis of the symbols and images of the many different festivals that she reviewed contributed significantly to the understanding of the Revolution and of French culture in general. She also undertook an analysis of ten outstanding women in French history by publishing Les Mots des femmes or Women's Words in 1995.

== Awards and honours ==
During her career, she has received many prestigious awards and honours, including the Grand prix Gobert in 2004 for her historical work, the literary prize Prix mondial Cino Del Duca in 2007, the Ordre des Arts et des Lettres also in 2007, and the Breton awards Order of the Ermine and Prix Breizh in 2009. The newly opened lycée at Ploërmel is named in her honour, and she was also honoured as a Commander of National Order of Merit (2011), Commander of the Legion of Honour (2014), the Prix de la langue française (2015), and Grand Officer of the National Order of Merit (2017).
