= Maurice Polard =

French novelist (1932–2022)

Maurice Polard (19 September 1932 – 19 April 2022) was a French novelist and short story writer.

== Life and career ==
Polard was born in Guipavas (Finistère, on 19 September 1932. After his childhood at Treflez, he continued his studies in Lesneven then Brest and Rennes where he obtained the agrégation of English. He made his career as a teacher at Landerneau and Brest.

His first novel, La Saison du maître, very much noticed at the time, recalled the war school in Britain in the mid-1980s.

Polard died in Tréflez on 19 April 2022, at the age of 89.

== Bibliography ==
- 1985: La Saison du maître, Gallimard, Prix Julien Dubreuil of the Académie française 1985 and Prix Français de La Table Ronde 1986
- 1988: Le Naufrageur, Gallimard, Grand Prix des Ecrivains de l'Ouest 1988 and Prix Bretagne 1988
- 1990: Le Château du vent, Éditions Gallimard
- 1996: Le Préau des rois, Picollec
- 1999: Confession d'un matin de Pâques on Gallica, Ouest-France
- 2006: Molto tristamente, artist's book with an unpublished text by Maurice Polard and 5 engravings by Anick Butré, Editions du Capricorne

Polard also wrote the preface to the book by Jean-Louis Potier: FINISTERE SAUVAGE (Rue des Scribes Editions), a book of photographs in black and white on the landscapes of Finistère.
