= Louis Martin-Chauffier =

French journalist and writer

Louis Martin-Chauffier, real name Louis Martin, (24 August 1894, Vannes – 6 October 1980, Puteaux) was a 20th-century French journalist and writer and a member of the French Resistance.

== Biography ==
=== Education ===
Louis Martin-Chauffier started medical studies and, after his father's death, passed the École nationale des chartes entry competition, where he was received in 1915. During the First World War, however, he was mobilized as an auxiliary doctor. He resumed his studies in 1919 and became an archivist-palaeographer in 1921, the year of his marriage with Simone Duval (1902–1975), translator and novelist. He was then appointed librarian at the bibliothèque Mazarine, then at Florence (1923–1927).

=== Interwar period ===
In 1922, he published his first novel, La Fissure. During the 1920s, Louis Martin-Chauffier wrote four novels before abandoning this genre, which he did not return to until 1950.

He also collaborated with the publishing house Au sans pareil, where he published avant-garde authors such as Blaise Cendrars, writing a presentation to Philippe Soupault as an appendix to Histoire d'un Blanc, or signing the preface of Aspects de la biographie by André Maurois. He also realized translations of classics (Aristophanes, Dante, etc.) for illustrated luxury editions; In the 1930s, he began the first edition of the complete works of André Gide (1932–1939) and worked for more than fifteen years on a study devoted to Chateaubriand, published in 1943 under the title Chateaubriand ou l'obsession de la pureté.

He also had a journalist activity: while being a librarian, he gave articles to various magazines, in particular to La Revue critique des idées et des livres, close to the Action française, then became a religious chronicler for Le Figaro.

Thereafter, he was editor-in-chief of various clearly left oriented weeklies, such as Lu,' 'Vu or Vendredi. In 1938, he became literary director of Match and editorialist in Paris-Soir.

=== Second World War ===
In 1940, he went to the Zone libre with the team of his newspaper. He entered the Resistance, becoming editor-in-chief of one of the most important clandestine newspapers, Libération in 1942. In May, he was arrested by the Gestapo and taken to the prison at Fort-Montluc; then in April 1944 he was transported to German concentration camps, first to Neuengamme and then to Bergen-Belsen At the Liberation of France, he was a delegate to the Provisional Consultative Assembly (July–August 1945) representing prisoners and deported, then continued his career as a journalist and continued to support the newspaper issue of clandestinity: he was the literary director of Libération, the daily directed by Emmanuel d'Astier de la Vigerie.

=== Post-war ===
He then worked for various daily and weekly newspapers: head of the foreign service of Le Parisien libéré, a literary columnist at Paris-Presse et à Paris Match, editor of Fémina-Illustration .

His work as a novelist and his work in favor of contemporary literature did not make him forget the great classics: he is the publisher of the complete works of La Rochefoucauld in the bibliothèque de la Pléiade.

He also engaged as a former resistant and deported and in the 1950s was one of the targets of the (verbal) attacks of the Holocaust deniers or revisionists of the time (Paul Rassinier, Albert Paraz, Maurice Bardèche). In 1952, he intervened in Le Figaro littéraire to answer Jean Paulhan's pamphlet, Lettre aux directeurs de la Résistance.

He became a fellow traveller of the Communist Party around 1944, but broke up with Communism in Winter 1952-1953, as a result of the Slansky trial and of the "Doctors' plot".

During the Algerian war, he actively participated in a "Commission internationale sur le système concentrationnaire" (International Commission on the Concentration System), which, in 1957 (the time of the Battle of Algiers), conducted an investigation into the repressive system established by the French army.

== Distinctions ==
- 1947: Grand prix de littérature de la SGDL for his entire work.
- 1957: Grand prix national des Lettres (ministère de la Culture) for his contribution to the influence of French literature.
- 1962: Prix Breizh for his entire work.

He was elected a member of the Académie des sciences morales et politiques in 1964.

== Main works ==
- 1921: L’Affaire des évêques simoniaques bretons et l’érection de Dol en métropole (848–850), thesis of the École des chartes
- 1923: Correspondances apocryphes, Mme de Vandeul et Diderot, Choderlos de Laclos, Flaubert, Barbey d'Aurevilly, Marcel Proust, Anatole France... (preface by Pierre Benoit)
- 1923: La Fissure, novel
- 1924: Patrice, ou l’indifférent, novel
- 1925: L’Épervier, novel
- 1927: L’Amant des honnêtes femmes, novel
- 1927: Jeux de l’âme, novel
- 1930: La Paix by Aristophanes, translation
- 1930: L’Enfer de Dante, translation
- 1932–1939: Œuvres complètes d’André Gide, edition
- 1943: Chateaubriand ou l’obsession de la pureté
- 1947: L’homme et la bête, essay
- 1950: Mon père n’est pas mort, novel
- 1958: L’Écrivain et la liberté, essay
- 1964: Œuvres complètes de La Rochefoucauld, edition
- 1989: Chroniques d’un homme libre

== Bibliography ==
- Jean Imbert, « Louis Martin-Chauffier », in Bibliothèque de l'École des chartes, 1982, n°140-142, p. 353-354
