= Jean-Pierre de Beaumarchais =

French bibliographer (born 1944)

Jean-Pierre Delarüe Caron de Beaumarchais (8 December 1944, Rome) is a French bibliographer, a descendant in the female line of Pierre Beaumarchais (whose family took on the name by decree of April 25, 1853).

== Biography ==
A former student of the École normale supérieure, agrégé de lettres classiques, Jean-Pierre de Beaumarchais is the author of studies on his ancestor and several dictionaries of writers and French literatures, in collaboration with Daniel Couty and Alain Rey. He also translated from English. Since 2012 he is a member of the Académie des Sciences, Belles-Lettres et Arts de Bordeaux, to which his stepfather also belonged.

He was Philippine de Rothschild's second husband. Their son Julien was born in 1971.

== Publications ==
- Beaumarchais : le Voltigeur des Lumières, coll. "Découvertes Gallimard" (nº 278), Paris, Gallimard, 1996 ISBN 978-2-07-053357-2
- Dictionnaire des écrivains de langue française, Paris, Bordas, 1997 ISBN 2-03-750040-8
- Dictionnaire des littératures de langue française, Bordas, 1984 ISBN 978-2-04-015333-5
- Dictionnaire des œuvres littéraires de langue française, Paris, Bordas, 1994 ISBN 978-2-04-027022-3
- Dictionnaire des grandes œuvres de la littérature française, Paris, Larousse 1997 ISBN 978-2-03-750040-1
- Les Grandes Œuvres de la littérature française, Paris, Bordas, 2003 ISBN 978-2-04-729831-2
- Les Grandes Répliques du théâtre français, Paris, Larousse, 2000 ISBN 2-03-505054-5
- Main droite, main gauche, Paris, Presses universitaires de France, 1997 ISBN 2-13-049058-1
- Beaumarchais : le Mariage de Figaro, Paris, Presses Universitaires de France, 2005

== Prizes ==
- Prix Georges Pompidou 1985 (avec A. Rey et D. Couty)
- Prix de la langue française 2005 for all his work
