= Vincent Muselli =

French writer and poet (1879–1956)

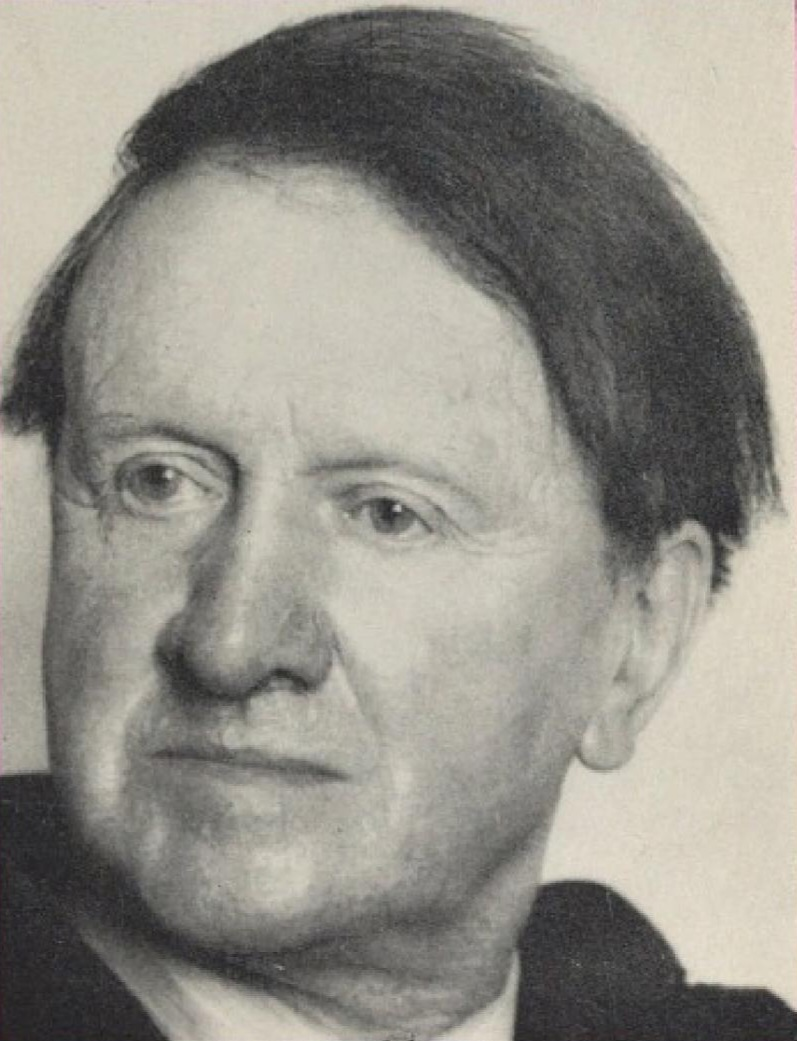
- Born: May 22, 1879; Argentan, France
- Died: June 28, 1956 (aged 77); Paris, France
- Occupations: Poet; writer
- Awards: Grand prix de littérature de la SGDL (1951)

Vincent Muselli (May 22, 1879 – June 28, 1956) was a French writer and poet. He published numerous works of poetry, and won the Grand prix de littérature de la SGDL. He was a friend of Guillaume Apollinaire.
