= Hôtel de Massa =

Coordinates: 48.8362°N 2.3376°E

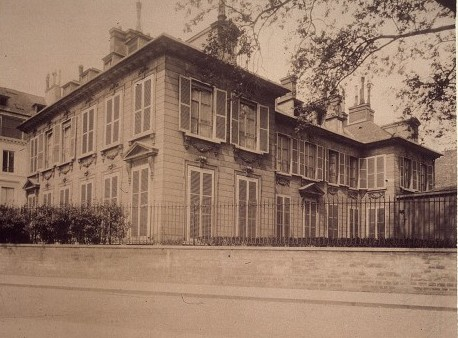
Hôtel Thiroux de Montsauge (original site), photograph by Eugène Atget (1906)

The Hôtel de Massa (French pronunciation: [otɛl də masa]) is an 18th-century hôtel particulier, or large townhouse, at 38 rue du Faubourg Saint-Jacques in the 14th arrondissement of Paris, France. It was originally located on the avenue des Champs-Élysées and was moved in 1929 to its present location, in a park beside the gardens of the Paris Observatory. Classified as a historical monument, it has since been occupied by the Société des gens de lettres.

== History ==
The neoclassical hotel was built between 1777 and 1778 by architect Jean-Baptiste Le Boursier for Thiroux de Montsauge, financial receiver-general and minister of finance.
At the time, the location selected lay on the "trail" of the Champs-Elysées but sits now at the intersection of rue La Boétie and avenue des Champs-Elysées. The hôtel was the setting of numerous fêtes galantes and, notably, the romances of Charles, count d'Artois and brother of Louis XVI, and of the duke de Richelieu, Emmanuel Duplessis de Richelieu-Fronsac.

=== Ownership ===
- 1788: Sold to the duke de Richelieu.
- 1793: Successively sold to three entrepreneurs during the French Revolution as a bien national.
- 1802: Repurchased by Bonaparte, then First Consul, for the state.
- 1804: Offered to count Nicola Maresca Donnurso di Serracapriola, Italian ambassador at Paris.
- 1815: Purchased by the countess de Durfort, daughter of Thiroux de Montsauge.
- 1825: Purchased by an entrepreneur, M. Bellet.
- 1827: Sold to the countess de Juigné, daughter of Durfort.
- 1830: Purchased by the count Flahaut de la Billarderie.
- 1853: Sold to the baron Roger du Nord, banker of Swiss origin, whose daughter married Alphonse Régnier, duke of Massa, grandson of Claude Régnier, minister of justice for Napoleon I of France. The duke and his successors inhabited the hotel as of 1857.

In 1870, the duke of Massa, watching the Prussian troops march on the Champs-Elysées, closed the hotel's blinds and swore not to reopen them before the day of revenge: it would be his grandson's privilege to reopen them on July 14, 1918, ironically one day before the second Battle of the Marne began near the river Marne with a German attack.
The hotel, which was shut down immediately by the confrontation, remained closed and uninhabited until 1926.

=== The relocation ===
In 1927, the hotel was threatened with demolition. Two businessmen, Théophile Bader, then president of the Galeries Lafayette, and André Lévy, who managed building operations, purchased the building but, not wanting to live in the hôtel, opted for relocation.
Planning to construct on the now-fashionable Champs-Elysées a commercial shopping and office complex designed by André Arfvidson for the National City Bank of America, Lévy worked closely with his friend Édouard Herriot, national minister of education, to organize and finance the relocation of the hôtel.

The building was donated to the state in 1928 on condition that it be destined to the Société des gens de lettres (SGDL), then led by Édouard Estaunié, to which it was leased for the symbolic price of 1 franc.

The SGDL had until then been deprived of an adequate head office, having been housed first at 14, Cité de Trévise (until 1896) and then at the hôtel at 10, Cité Rougement. The state, in the person of Édouard Herriot, then minister of public instruction and fine arts, offered a portion of the garden of the Observatory of Paris upon which the hotel would be relocated.

The building was moved stone by stone under the supervision of André Ventre. The Art Deco furniture ordered on this occasion by the management of the Galeries Lafayette was made up of a unique set of 110 pieces. The interior was itself designated a Monument historique —an historical monument— in 1984.

The SGDL brought to this location memorabilia of varied origin and pedigree (portraits, busts and autographs) representing almost 170 years of literature.
Befittingly, the hotel now sits steps away from where Honoré de Balzac wrote Les Chouans, Histoire des Treize, La Femme de trente ans and the start of his la Comédie humaine. It was at his instigation, in 1838, following his celebrated Lettre aux écrivains français du XIXe siècle (1834), that the SGDL now housed in the hotel was founded.
