= Anthony Palou =

French writer (born 1965)

Anthony Palou (born 1965, Quimper) is a French writer. From 1991 to 1997, Anthony Palou was Jean-Edern Hallier's private secretary.

As of 2016, he is a journalist for Le Figaro.

== Bibliography ==
- Camille (novel). Paris: Éditions Christian de Bartillat. 2000. p. 140. ISBN 978-2-84100-233-7.
  - Prix Décembre 2000.
- Allô, c'est Jean-Edern... : Hallier sur écoutes. Neuilly-sur-Seine, France: Éditions Michel Lafon. 2006. p. 166. ISBN 978-2-7499-0588-4.
- Fruits et Légumes (novel). Paris: Albin Michel. 2010. p. 160. ISBN 978-2-226-21518-5.
  - Prix Terre de France - La Montagne 2010.
  - Prix des Deux Magots 2011.
  - Prix Breizh 2011
- Dans ma rue y avait trois boutiques (Les Presses de la Cité, 2021)
  - Prix Renaudot Essay (fr.: Le Renaudot de l'essai) 2021
