= Catherine Collard =

French classical pianist

Catherine Collard (11 August 1947 – 10 October 1993) was a French classical pianist.

She entered the Paris Conservatoire at the age of 14, where she studied with Yvonne Lefébure and Germaine Mounier. She was awarded the first prize in piano in 1964, and the first prize in chamber music in 1966. She won a number of prizes in competitions (the Claude Debussy, Olivier Messiaen, Fondation de la vocation amongst others), which began a career of distinction. André Tubeuf, writing in Gramophone magazine, characterised her as "an artist too often classed in a line of descent from Clara Haskil but who, in her timbre and sonority, is without question much closer to Yves Nat."

She was a frequent piano duo partner of Anne Queffélec. She was on the piano teaching faculty of the conservatoire of Saint-Maur. She died of cancer at the age of 46.

== Discography ==
- Gilbert Amy: Epigramme
- Johann Sebastian Bach: Prelude and Fugue in A minor (Bach/Liszt), Prelude and Fugue in C major BWV 846
- André Boucourechliev: Archipel 4, Op. 10
- Johannes Brahms: Sonatas for cello and piano Nos. 1 and 2 (with Suzanne Ramon), Rhapsodie, Op. 79, Intermezzi, Op. 117, Klavierstücke, Op. 118
- Claude Debussy: Préludes Books I et II, Etudes pour les sonorités opposées, Etudes pour les arpèges composés, Mélodies (with Nathalie Stutzmann)
- Gabriel Fauré: Mélodies (with Nathalie Stutzmann)
- César Franck: Prélude, Chorale and Fugue, Quintet with the Quatuor Orlando; Violin Sonata in A with Régis Pasquier
- Edvard Grieg: Piano Concerto
- Joseph Haydn: Piano Sonatas (3 volumes)
- Vincent d'Indy : Symphonie sur un chant montagnard français op.25 - (« Symphonie cévenole ») - Orchestre Philharmonique de Radio France - Conducted by Marek Janowski
- Olivier Messiaen: Regard de l'Onction terrible
- Wolfgang Amadeus Mozart: Sonates for flute and piano, K.376, K.296, K.377 (with Philippe Bernold)
- Sergei Prokofiev: Violin Sonata No. 1 (with Catherine Courtois)
- Maurice Ravel: Jeux d'eau, Mélodies (with Nathalie Stutzmann)
- Erik Satie: 3 Gymnopédies and 6 Gnosiennes (with Anne Queffelec)
- Arnold Schoenberg: Klavierstücke, Op. 11
- Robert Schumann: Carnaval, Papillons, Arabesques, Kinderszenen, Sonata in F minor, Davidsbündlertänze, Piano Concerto, Dichterliebe (with Nathalie Stutzmann), Violin Sonatas Nos. 1 and 2 (with Catherine Courtois)

== Sources ==
- Anonymous biography of Catherine Collard in Haydn: Piano Sonatas 3, Lyrinx CD LYR 126. 1999
