= Jean-François Coatmeur =

French crime fiction writer

Jean-François Coatmeur (26 July 1925 – 11 December 2017) was a French crime fiction writer.

He was born in Pouldavid, near Douarnenez in 1925, and later moved to Brest. In 1976, he won the Grand Prix de Littérature Policière for Les Sirènes de minuit. His 1980 work La Bavure was awarded the Prix Mystère de la critique in 1981. In 1992, Coatmeur received the Prix Bretagne for Des croix sur la mer. He died in Brest at the age of 92 on 11 December 2017.
