= Cédric Morgan =

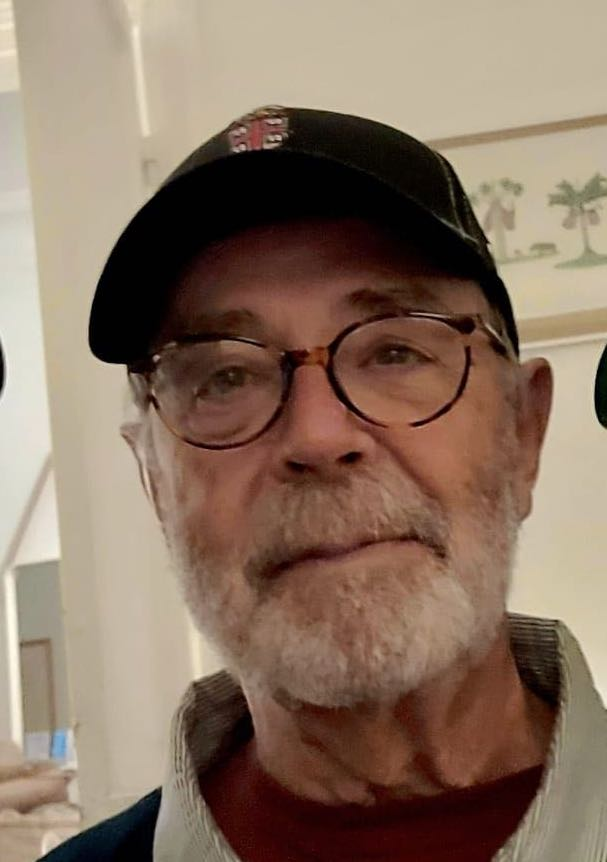
Cédric Morgan

Cédric Morgan, pen name of Jean-Yves Quenouille (born 1943 in Vannes (Morbihan) is a French writer. He writes in addition to working in communication for Rhône-Poulenc, Usinor and Pechiney. He mainly lives in Brittany.

== Publications ==
Books
Title	Year	Publisher	Awards and Nominations
Cet hiver-là	1991	Éditions Phébus	
Les ailes du Tigre	1993	Éditions Phébus	
L'Enfant perdu	1995	Éditions Phébus	selections Renaudot, Femina and Interallié
Le Bonheur en douce	1999	Éditions Phébus	selection Prix des Libraires
Le Bleu de la mer	2003	Éditions Phébus	novel prize of the city of Carhaix, selection Prix Interallié
Oublier l'orage	2005	Éditions Phébus	
Kafka ramait le dimanche	2009	Éditions Phébus	
Une femme simple	2014	Éditions Grasset	Prix Breizh

Cédric Morgan also created and edited a poetry journal, Incendits, published between 1975 and 1995, with the help of the Centre National des Lettres, a magazine which published a number of contemporary poets, such as Hédi Kaddour and Roger Goffette.
