= Yvonne Chauffin =

French writer

Yvonne Chauffin (26 March 1905, Lille – 6 December 1995, Caudan) was a 20th-century French writer. A catholic, she wrote as a critic for Le Pèlerin. She received the Prix Breizh in 1970.

== Work ==
- 1952: Marqués sur l'épaule, Amiot Dumont
- 1952–1955: Les Rambourt, novel, La Table Ronde: I. Que votre volonté soit faite, 1952; II. Le combat de Jacob, 1953; III. La porte des Hébreux, 1954; IV. Le voyage de Tobie, 1955. (Grand prix catholique de littérature in 1956)
- 1958: La Brûlure, novel, Le livre contemporain
- 1960: La Marion du Faoüet, novel
- 1961: Saint-Jérôme, France Empire
- 1961: Risquer sa chance sur Dieu, essay, Éditions France-Empire
- 1961: Le Carrelage
- 1967: Le Séminariste
- 1970: La Cellule, novel, Plon, Prix Breizh 1970
- 1976: Les Amours difficiles, novel
- 1976: L'Église est liberté : le cardinal Koenig, essay
- 1976: Le Tribunal du merveilleux, (with Marc Oraison)

== Bibliography ==
- Lagrée, Michel, ed. (1990). La Bretagne. Dictionnaire du monde religieux dans la France contemporaine (in French). Paris: Éditions Beauchesne. pp. 82–83. ISBN 978-2-7010-1202-5.

== Sources ==
- Les Noms qui ont fait l'histoire de Bretagne, Coop Breizh and Institut culturel de Bretagne, 1997, notice by Marie-Madeleine Martinie.
