= Maurice Rat =

- Born: March 2, 1891
- Died: May 13, 1969 (aged 78); Paris, France

Maurice Rat (March 2, 1891 – May 13, 1969) was a French philologist. He was the uncle of cyberneticist Robert Vallée.
