= European Academy of Art in Brittany =

Art school in France

Coordinates: 48.1145°N 1.6765°W

The European Academy of Art in Brittany (French: École européenne supérieure d'art de Bretagne; EESAB) is a French art school founded on December 27, 2010. It has four campuses: Brest, Lorient, Quimper et Rennes. With more than 800 students, it is the largest art school in France. On 1 April 2016, Danièle Yvergniaux was appointed general director of the school. She had been the director at Quimper since 2006. Since 2024, the school's director is Claire Jacquet, former director of the Frac Nouvelle-Aquitaine MÉCA. The school is accredited by the French Ministry of Culture to grant the National Diploma in Art (Diplôme national d'art) and the National Higher Diploma in Visual Expression (Diplôme national supérieur d'expression plastique)
