= Tréflez =

Tréflez Trelez
- Commune
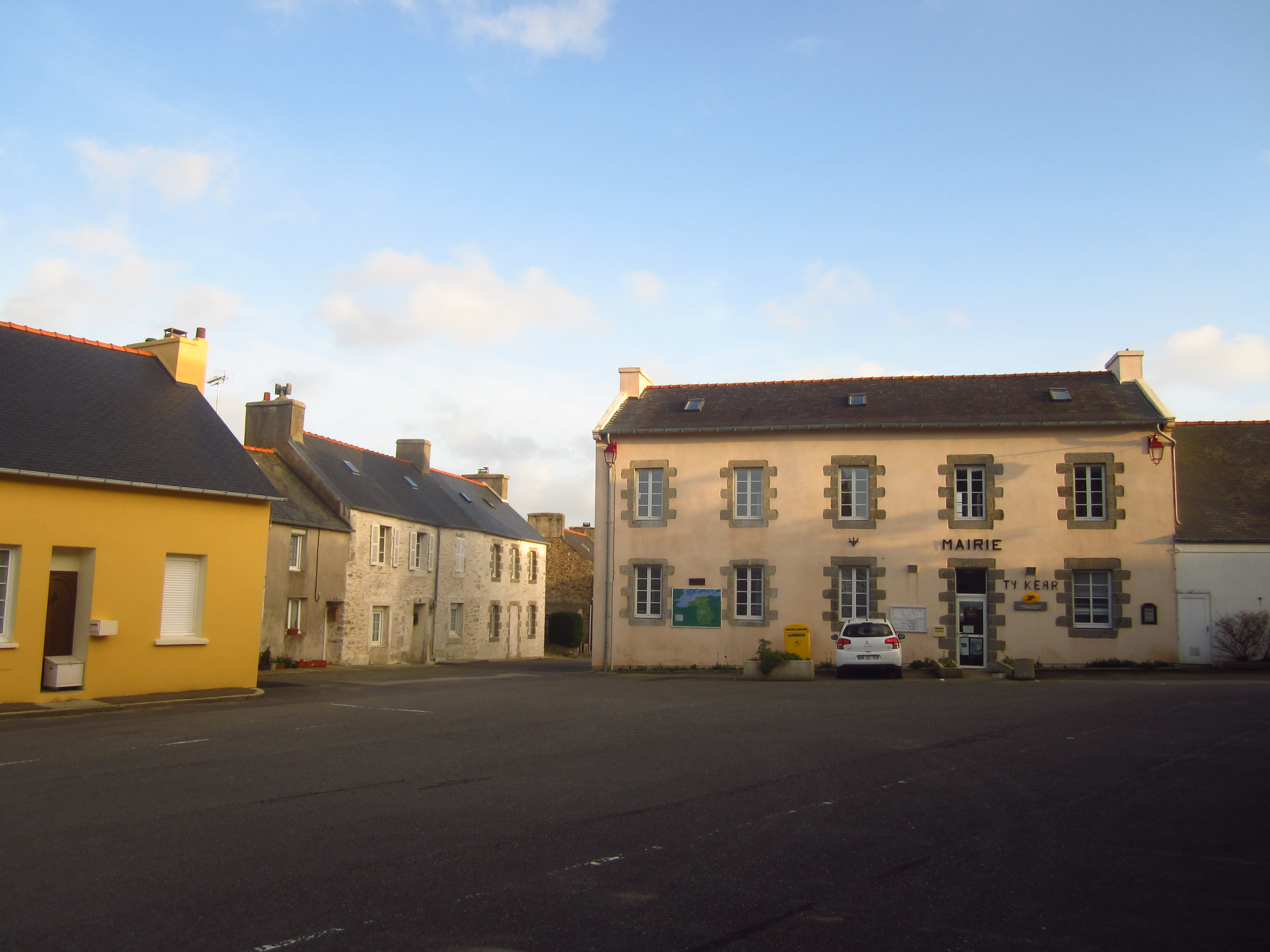
- The town hall in Tréflez
- Location of Tréflez
- Location within France Location within Brittany
- Coordinates: 48°37′28″N 4°15′37″W
- Country: France
- Region: Brittany
- Department: Finistère
- Arrondissement: Morlaix
- Canton: Saint-Pol-de-Léon
- Intercommunality: Haut-Léon Communauté

Government
  - Mayor (2020–2026): Anne Bescond
- Area^{1}: 15.76 km^{2} (6.08 sq mi)
- Highest elevation: 77 m (253 ft)
- Lowest elevation: 0 m (0 ft)
- Population (2023): 991
  - Density: 62.9/km^{2} (163/sq mi)
- Time zone: UTC+01:00 (CET)
  - Summer (DST): UTC+02:00 (CEST)
- INSEE/Postal code: 29287 /29430
- ^{1} French Land Register data, which excludes lakes, ponds, glaciers > 1 km^{2} (0.386 sq mi or 247 acres) and river estuaries.

Tréflez (French pronunciation: [tʁeflɛz]; Breton: Trelez) is a commune in the Finistère department of Brittany in north-western France.

== Population ==
Inhabitants of Tréflez are called in French Tréfléziens.

Historical population
Year	Pop.	±% p.a.
1968	966	—
1975	872	−1.45%
1982	826	−0.77%
1990	763	−0.99%
1999	760	−0.04%
2007	876	+1.79%
2012	911	+0.79%
2017	958	+1.01%
2023	991	+0.57%
Source: INSEE

== People linked to Treflez ==
- Pierre Pincemaille (1956–2018), French musician, is buried in the new cemetery of Treflez.

== See also ==
- Communes of the Finistère department
- List of the works of Bastien and Henry Prigent
