= Philippe Le Guillou =

French writer

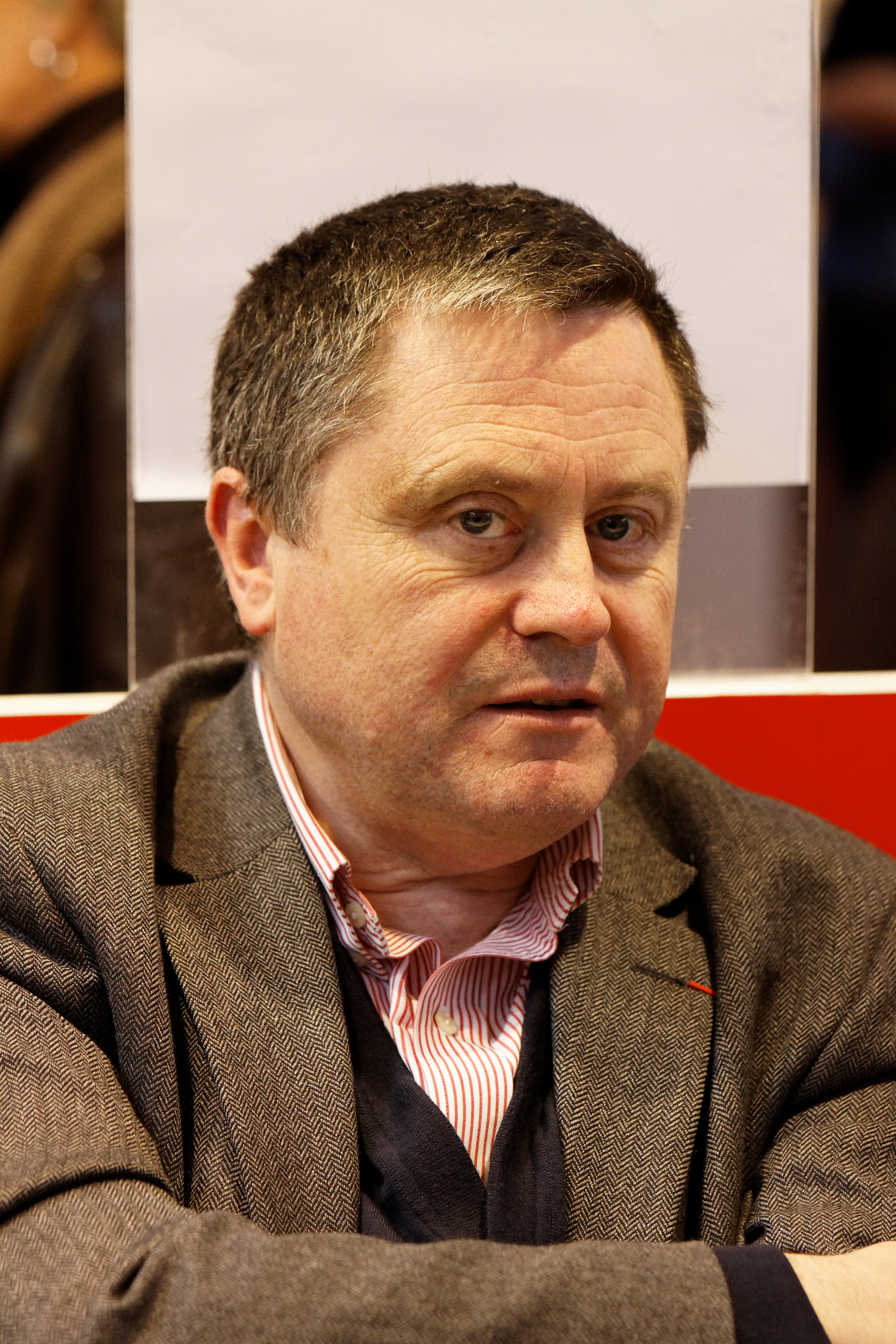
Guillou in 2011

Philippe Le Guillou is a French writer. He was born in Finistère on 12 August 1959. A prolific writer, he has published around 40 books, including fiction and non-fiction. He won the Prix Médicis for Les Sept Noms du peintre and the Prix Mediterranee for La Rumeur du soleil.
