= Jean-Luc Coatalem =

French journalist and writer (born 1959)

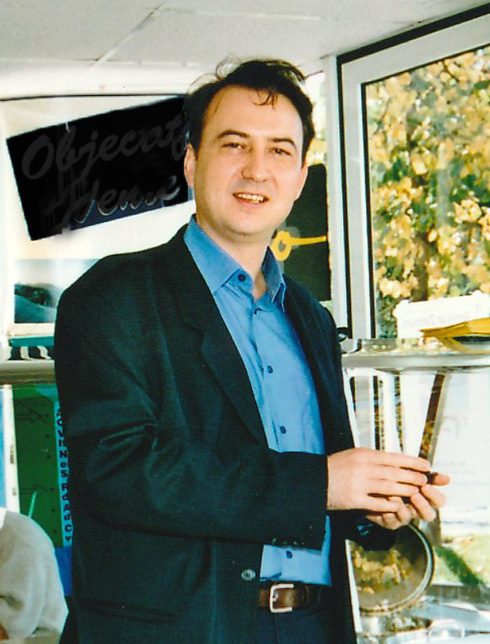
Jean-Luc Coatalem at the 2001 International Geography Festival

Jean-Luc Coatalem (18 September 1959, Paris) is a French journalist and writer.

== Biography ==
In the wake of a family of officers, Jean-Luc Coatalem spent his childhood in Polynesia and his adolescence in Madagascar. The incessant removals gave him the taste of elsewhere and would make him bulimic on travels and reports.

Returning to Paris, he worked in publishing and then was a reporter in the footsteps of Francisco Coloane, Nicolas Bouvier or Ella Maillart for Grands Reportages, le Figaro Magazine and Géo, which opened him a position of deputy editor-in-chief. He explored nearly eighty countries, "on foot, on horseback, in ultralight and on ice-breakers". In particular, he produced two accounts on Chiloé Island in Chile and Labrador which drew attention on him.

Coming to his thirties, this traveller, novelist, writer and essayist writer for whom "all travel ends in books and everything starts from a reading", published wandering narratives (Mission au Paraguay, Suite indochinoise...) and humorous novels (Capitaine, Le Fils du fakir).

In 1992, he was with Nicolas Bouvier and Gilles Lapouge one of the nine signatories of the "Manifesto for a traveling literature" published under the aegis of Michel Le Bris.

In 2001, Je suis dans les mers du Sud, a very personal essay that he drew from an investigation on Paul Gauguin, was distinguished by numerous awards, including the Prix Breizh 2002 and was translated into English and Chinese. He confirmed his notoriety two years later with an ode to geography and wandering, La consolation des voyages.

Jean-Luc Coatalem no longer hesitates to approach intimist writing. Il faut se quitter déjà published in 2008, is a melancholic account of a non-passionate love wandering between Buenos Aires and Montevideo. Le Dernier roi d'Angkor, inspired by the difficult adoption of a Cambodian orphan, evokes the indescribable tear of a past abolished.

After Le Gouverneur d’Antipodia published at Le Dilettante in 2012 was awarded the Prix Roger Nimier, he published Nouilles froides à Pyongyang, an unusual narrative under the dictatorship of Kim Jong-Il. His last work, Fortune de mer was published by Stock editor in 2015.

Passionate about art and graphic design, he participated in parallel to works or catalogues around the sculptor Denis Monfleur at editions la Table ronde, and the painter François Dilasser at editions La Navire, but also developed a fruitful collaboration with his accomplice and friend Jacques de Loustal. They jointly signed three albums with Casterman.

== Works ==
- 1988: Zone tropicale, Le Dilettante
- 1989: Fièvre jaune, Le Dilettante
- 1991: Capitaine, Flammarion
- 1992: Triste sire, Le Dilettante
- 1992: Affaires indigènes, Groupe Flammarion
- 1993: Suite indochinoise, Le Dilettante
- 1994: Villa Zaouche, Grasset
- 1995: Tout est factice, Grasset
- 1996: Concession 126, Éditions du Rocher
- 1997: Les Beaux Horizons, Le Dilettante
- 1998: Mission Paraguay, Payot Voyageurs
- 1998: Le Fils du fakir, Grasset
- 2001: Je suis dans les mers du Sud, Grasset
- 2004: La consolation des voyages, Grasset
- 2008: Il faut se quitter déjà, Grasset
- 2010: Le Dernier roi d'Angkor, Grasset
- 2012: Le gouverneur d’Antipodia, Le Dilettante ISBN 978-2-84263-688-3
- 2013: Nouilles froides à Pyongyang, Grasset
- 2013: Avec les Indiens du bout du monde - Les sept voyages du Commandant Martial au Cap Horn, in Aventuriers du monde - Les archives des explorateurs français, 1827-1914., p. 156-175, Éditions de l'Iconoclaste, ISBN 978-2-91336-660-2.
- 2015: Fortune de mer, Stock

== Distinctions ==
- 1998: Bourse Cino del Duca
- 2001: Prix Amerigo Vespucci, Prix Tristan Corbière
- 2002: Prix des Deux Magots, Prix Breizh
- 2012: Prix Roger Nimier for Le gouverneur d’Antipodia, Éditions Le Dilettante.
- 2012: Prix des lecteurs of Le Maine Libre

== Bibliography ==
Services de documentation, Notice biographique Jean-Luc Coatalem - 54 ans - Romancier, nouvelliste, reporter., Radio France, Paris, 5 April 2013.
