= Rue d'Astorg =

Street in Paris, France

Coordinates: 48.8731°N 2.3195°E

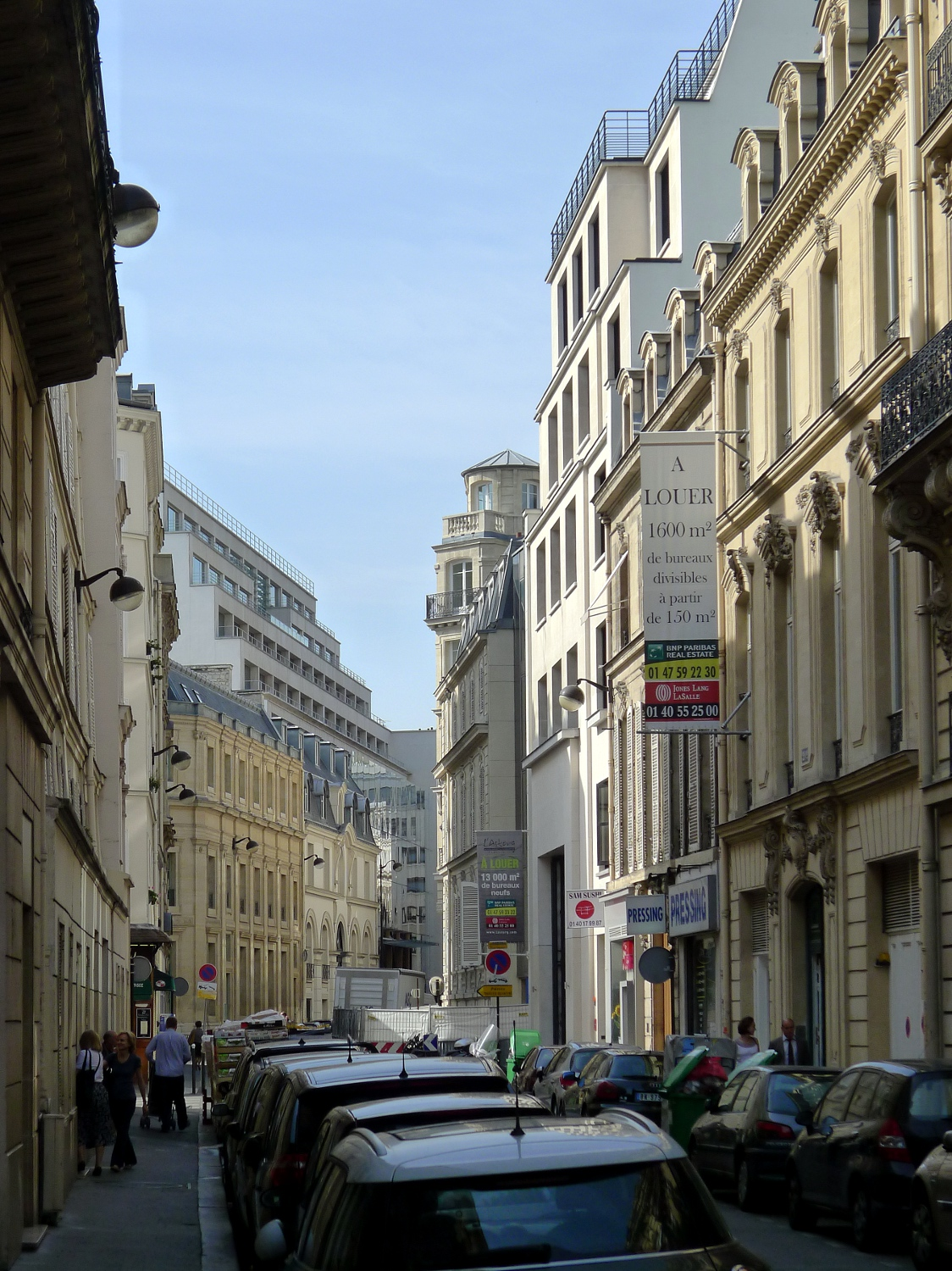
Rue d'Astorg in 2011

The Rue d'Astorg is a street in the 8th arrondissement of Paris, France. It was built in 1774 on land formerly owned by Louis d'Astorg d'Aubarède, Marquess of Roquépine.
