= Hubert Haddad =

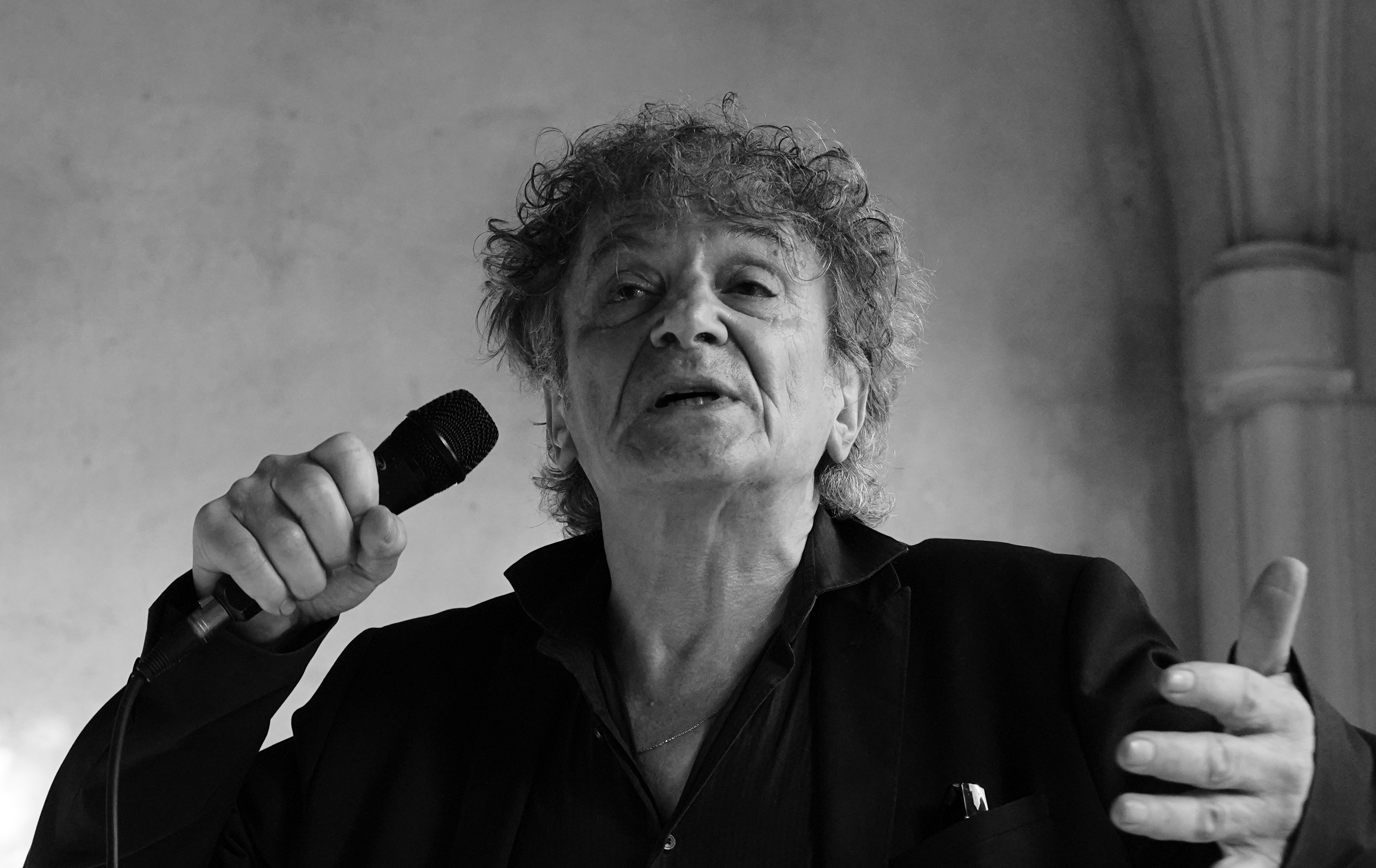
- Born: 1947 (age 78–79); Tunis,Tunisia
- Occupations: Novelist; poet

Hubert Haddad is a Tunisian poet, playwright, short story writer and novelist. He was born in Tunis in 1947. His debut collection of poems Le Charnier déductif appeared in 1967, and his first novel Un rêve de glace was published in 1974. Since then he has published numerous works in a wide range of literary forms.

Haddad is an experienced teacher of creative writing workshops.

== Bibliography ==
All the following books are published, in French, by Éditions Zulma.

=== Novels ===
- Mā, 2015
- Corps désirable, 2015 – Desirable Body, translated by Alyson Waters (Yale University Press, 2018)
- Théorie de la vilaine petite fille, 2014 – Rochester Knockings: a Novel of the Fox Sisters, translated by Jennifer Grotz (Open Letter Books, 2015)
- Le Peintre d'éventail, 2013
- Opium Poppy, 2011 – Opium Poppy, translated by Renuka George (Social Science Press, India, 2015)
- Vent printanier, 2010
- Géométrie d'un rêve, 2009
- Palestine, 2007 (Prix des cinq continents de la francophonie) – Palestine, translated by Pierre L'Abbé (Guernica Editions, 2014)
- Oholiba des songes, 2007
- Le Ventriloque amoureux, 2002
- L'Univers, 1999, 2009
- Tango chinois, 1998
- La Condition magique, 1997 (Grand Prix du Roman de la Société des Gens de Lettres)

=== Short stories ===
- Nouvelles du jour et de la juit, 2011
- Vent printanier, 2010

=== Others ===
- Les Haïkus du peintre d'éventail, 2013
- Le Nouveau Nouveau Magasin d'écriture, 2007
- Le Nouveau Magasin d'écriture, 2006
