= Anne Queffélec =

French classical pianist (born 1948)

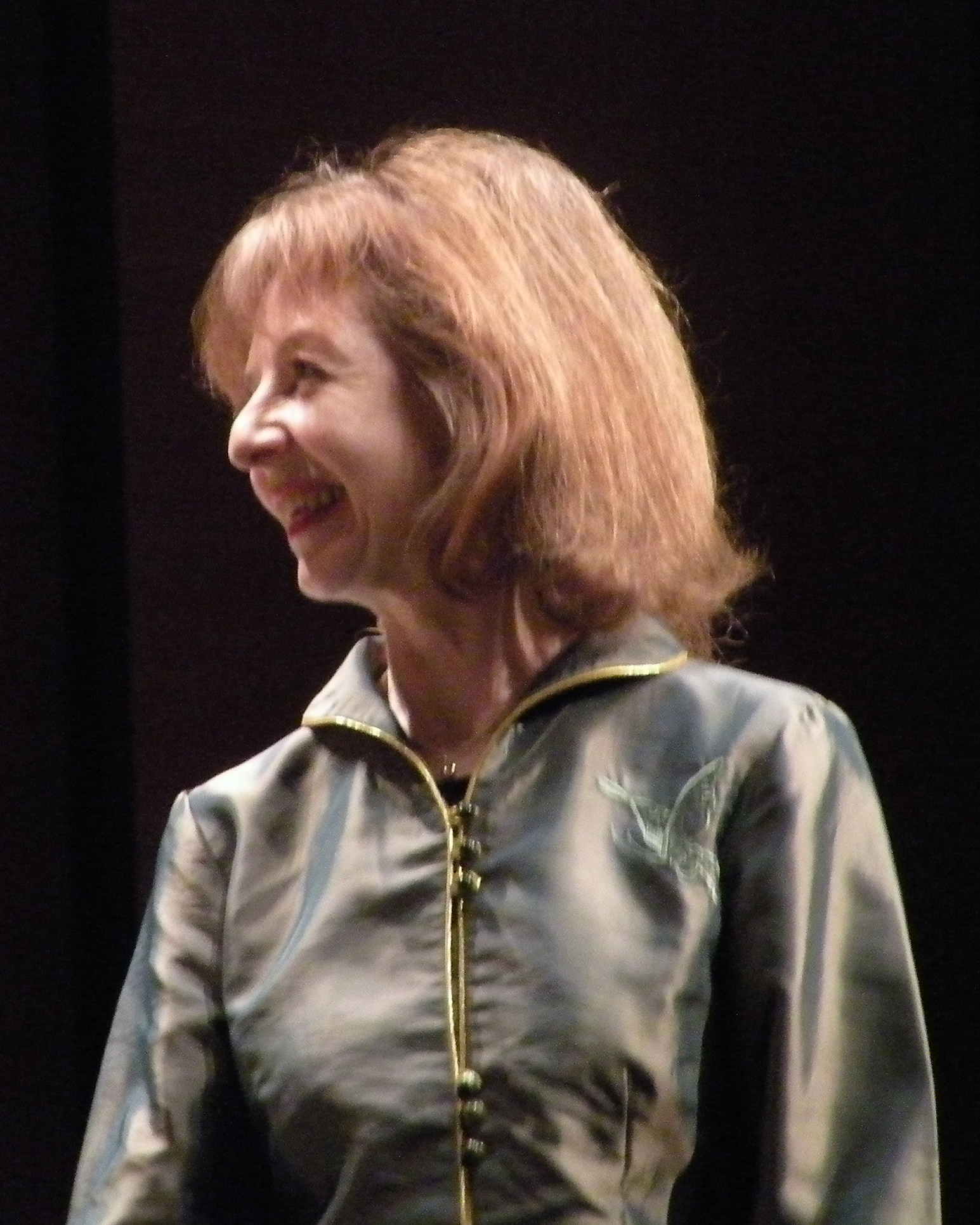

Background information
- Born: 7 January 1948 (age 77) Paris, France
- Genres: Classical
- Occupation: Pianist
- Instrument: Piano
- Years active: 1968–present

Anne Bénédicte Jeanne Queffélec (born 17 January 1948) is a French classical pianist.

== Biography ==
Born in Paris in 1948, Queffélec was the daughter of writer Henri Queffélec. Her brother Yann followed their father's profession; their brother Hervé is a mathematician.

She attended the Cours Hattemer, a private school. Despite an early passion for literature, she chose a life in music at a young age. She started playing piano at the age of five. In 1964, she enrolled in the Paris Conservatoire. She won the first prize for piano in 1965 and the first prize for chamber music in 1966. She continued her education with Paul Badura-Skoda and Jörg Demus, and went on to study in Vienna with Alfred Brendel. She won the first prize at the Munich competition in 1968, and in 1969, was a prize-winner at the Leeds International Piano Competition. Since then, she has enjoyed an international career.

She is not only famous as a solo concert pianist, but is also well known for her chamber music playing in cooperation with artists such as Catherine Collard, Pierre Amoyal, Frédéric Lodéon, and Imogen Cooper.

== Awards ==
In 1990, she was awarded the French prize of Victoires de la musique classique (Soliste instrumental de l'année).

On 6 January 2004, she was made 'Officier' of l'Ordre national du Mérite.

She was promoted to 'Commandeur' de l'ordre national du Mérite on 14 November 2011.

== Discography ==
=== Albums ===
- 1976: (with Alain Lombard, Orchestre philharmonique de Strasbourg) – Ravel, Les deux concertos pour piano (ERATO)
- 1977: Mendelssohn: Anne Queffélec, Pierre Amoyal, Frédéric Lodéon – Les Deux Trios Pour Piano, Violon & Violoncelle (ERATO)
- 1978: (with Pierre Amoyal) Fauré, sonates pour piano et violon (ERATO)
- 1979: (with Imogen Cooper) Franz Schubert, Œuvres pour piano à 4 mains (ERATO)
- 1988: Erik Satie
- 1995: Scarlatti: 13 Sonatas
- 1996: Dutilleux: The Works for Piano
- 1998: Ravel: Piano Works
- 1999: Schubert: Sonata D. 894; Fantasy D. 940; Sonata D. 959; Four Impromtus D.899
- 2000: (with Imogen Cooper) Schubert: Works for Piano Four Hands
- 2000: (with Catherine Collard) Satie: Works for solo piano & piano 4 hands
- 2001: Ravel: Piano Concertos; Debussy: Fantasie for Piano & Orchestra
- 2001: (with Imogen Cooper) Schubert: Piano Works for Four Hands
- 2002: Serenity: Satie
- 2002: Mozart: Anne Queffélec
- 2003: The works for solo piano volume 1 (EMI)
  - The works for solo piano volume 2 (EMI)
- 2004: Beethoven: Lettre à Élise
- 2004: Satie, Ravel: Piano Works
- 2004: Satie: Gnossiennes; Gymnopédies; Piano Works
- 2006: Haendel: Suites HWV430, 431, 433 & 436
- 2006: Satie: 3 Gymnopédies; 6 Gnossiennes
- 2007: Domenico Scarlatti, Sonate pour piano (Warner Apex)
- 2008: Satie: Gymnopédies; Gnossiennes; Sports and Divertissements
- 2009: Johann Sebastian Bach: Contemplation
- 2009: (with Imogen Cooper) Schubert: Piano Works for Four Hands
- 2009: Haydn, Sonates et variations (Mirare)
- 2010: Chopin, De l'enfance à la plénitude (Mirare)
- 2013: Satie & Compagnie
- 2014: Ombre et lumière D. Scarlatti 18 sonates pour clavier (Mirare MIR 265)
