= Marcel Schneider (writer) =

French writer

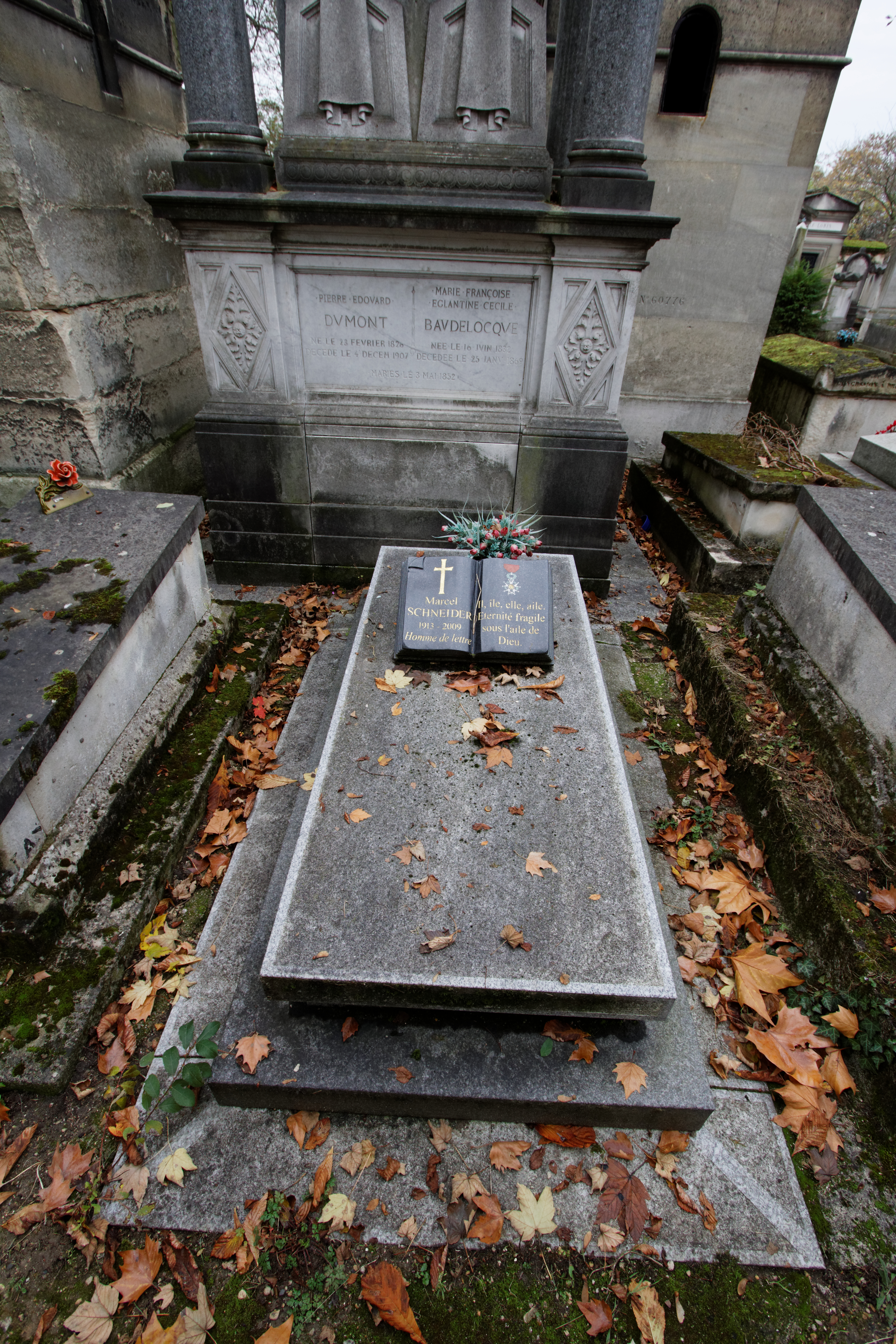
- Schneider's grave at Père Lachaise Cemetery
- Born: 11 August 1913; Levallois-Perret
- Died: 22 January 2009 (aged 95); Paris
- Occupation: Writer

Marcel Schneider (11 August 1913 – 22 January 2009) was a French writer, laureate of numerous literary awards.

== Biography ==
Schneider was born in a family of Alsatian origin who chose France after 1871. An agrégé es letters, he taught in Rouen (Jean Lecanuet was among his students), before devoting himself entirely to literature and music. He came to live in Paris and became a member of the publishing house Grasset.

Both as a writer and as a historian of literature, he was an adept of fantastic literature. He recognized three masters in the fantastic field: Charles Nodier, Gérard de Nerval and Ernst Theodor Amadeus Hoffmann.

His works were published by Schubert and Wagner and traced the history of the ballet since Louis XIV.

A sympathizer of the Action française, he was close to writers as different as André Gide, Georges Dumézil and Paul Morand who bequeathed him his wardrobe. He also attended literary salons including those of Marie-Laure de Noailles, Solange de La Baume, Josette Day and Florence Gould.

In the 1980s, he regularly wrote in Le Quotidien de Paris (Groupe Quotidien), founded and directed by Philippe Tesson.

He was close to friends such as Jacques Brenner, Henri Sauguet and Matthieu Galey and used to publish in Brenner's Les Cahiers des Saison (1953–1962).

Schneider was awarded the 1996 prix de la langue française.

He is buried at Père Lachaise Cemetery (45th division).

== Memoirs ==
Schneider published his memoirs in the form of a diary in the following order:

- 1989: L'Éternité fragile, Paris, Éditions Grasset
- 1991: Innocence et Vérité, Grasset
- 1992: Le Palais des mirages, Grasset,
- 1993: Le Goût de l'absolu, Grasset
- 2001: Les Gardiens du secret, Grasset, Prix Ève Delacroix

== Bibliography ==
- 1947: Le granit et l'absence
- 1948: Cueillir le romarin
- 1950: Le chasseur vert
- 1951: La première île
- 1952: Le sang léger
- 1953: L'enfant du dimanche
- 1955: Aux couleurs de la nuit, short stories
- 1956: Les deux miroirs
- 1957: Schubert
- 1958: L'escurial et l'amour
- 1959: Wagner
- 1959: Sauguet
- 1960: Le jeu de l'Oie
- 1960: Le Sablier magique, tales illustrated by Élisabeth Ivanovsky
- 1961: Le cardinal de Virginie
- 1962: Les colonnes du Temple
- 1962: La Branche de Merlin
- 1967: La Sibylle de Cumes.
- 1969: Le Guerrier de pierre, novel
- 1972: Le Lieutenant perdu, novel
- 1975: Le Vampire de Düsseldorf, in collaboration with Philippe Brunet
- 1978: Jean-Jacques Rousseau et l'espoir écologiste
- 1979: Hoffmann
- 1982: La Lumière du Nord, short stories, Grasset, Prix du Livre Inter
- 1983: Mère Merveille, novel
- 1985: Histoires à mourir debout, short stories
- 1985: Histoire de la littérature fantastique en France
- 1987: La Fin du carnaval, short stories
- 2003: Le Labyrinthe de l'Arioste, essai sur l'allégorique, le légendaire et le stupéfiant
- 1995: Ce que j'aime
- 1997: Paris, lanterne magique
- 1999: Ombre perdue de l'Allemagne
- 2002: Esprit du ballet
- 2004: Mille roses trémières. L'amitié de Paul Morand, essay
- 2005: Jours de féerie, short stories
- 2006: Moi qui suis né trop tard
- 2009: Il faut laisser maisons et jardins

== Prizes and distinctions ==
- 1950: Prix Cazes for Le Chasseur vert
- 1976: Prix Marcel Proust for Sur une étoile
- 1982: Prix du Livre Inter for La Lumière du Nord
- 1990: Prix Maurice Genevoix for L'éternité fragile
- 1990: Prix Jean-Freustié for L'Éternité fragile
- 1996: Grand prix de littérature Paul-Morand
- 1998: Prix de la langue française
- 2001: Prix Ève Delacroix for Les Gardiens du secret

== Sources ==
- Roger Peyrefitte, Propos secrets, Paris, Albin Michel, 1977
- Matthieu Galey, Journal I (1953-1964), Grasset, 1987
- Matthieu Galey, Journal II (1965-1986), Grasset, 1989
- Jean Dutourd, Diane de Margerie, Christine Jordis, Solange Fasquelle, Avec Marcel Schneider, Éditions du Rocher, 2005
- Hommage à Marcel Schneider in Bulletin de "La Route inconnue", bulletin des Amis d'André Dhôtel, n° 23 June 2009
