= Henri Queffélec =

French writer

Henri Queffélec (29 January 1910 – 13 January 1992) was a French writer and screenwriter.

== Biography ==
He studied at the lycée Louis-le-Grand and then the École normale supérieure. He obtained the "agrégation de lettres" in 1934.

He is considered the great maritime novelist in French of the 20th century; Queffélec was the author of more than 80 books, many of which were inspired by his native Brittany and by the sea, e.g. Un recteur de l'Île de Sein which was filmed by Jean Delannoy under the title Dieu a besoin des hommes.

He was awarded the Grand prix du roman of the Académie française in 1958 for Un royaume sous la mer; he was awarded the ordre de l'Hermine in 1988.

Henri Queffélec was the father of the author Yann Queffélec, the pianist Anne Queffélec and of the mathematician Hervé Queffélec, and father-in-law of Hervé's wife, mathematician Martine Queffélec.

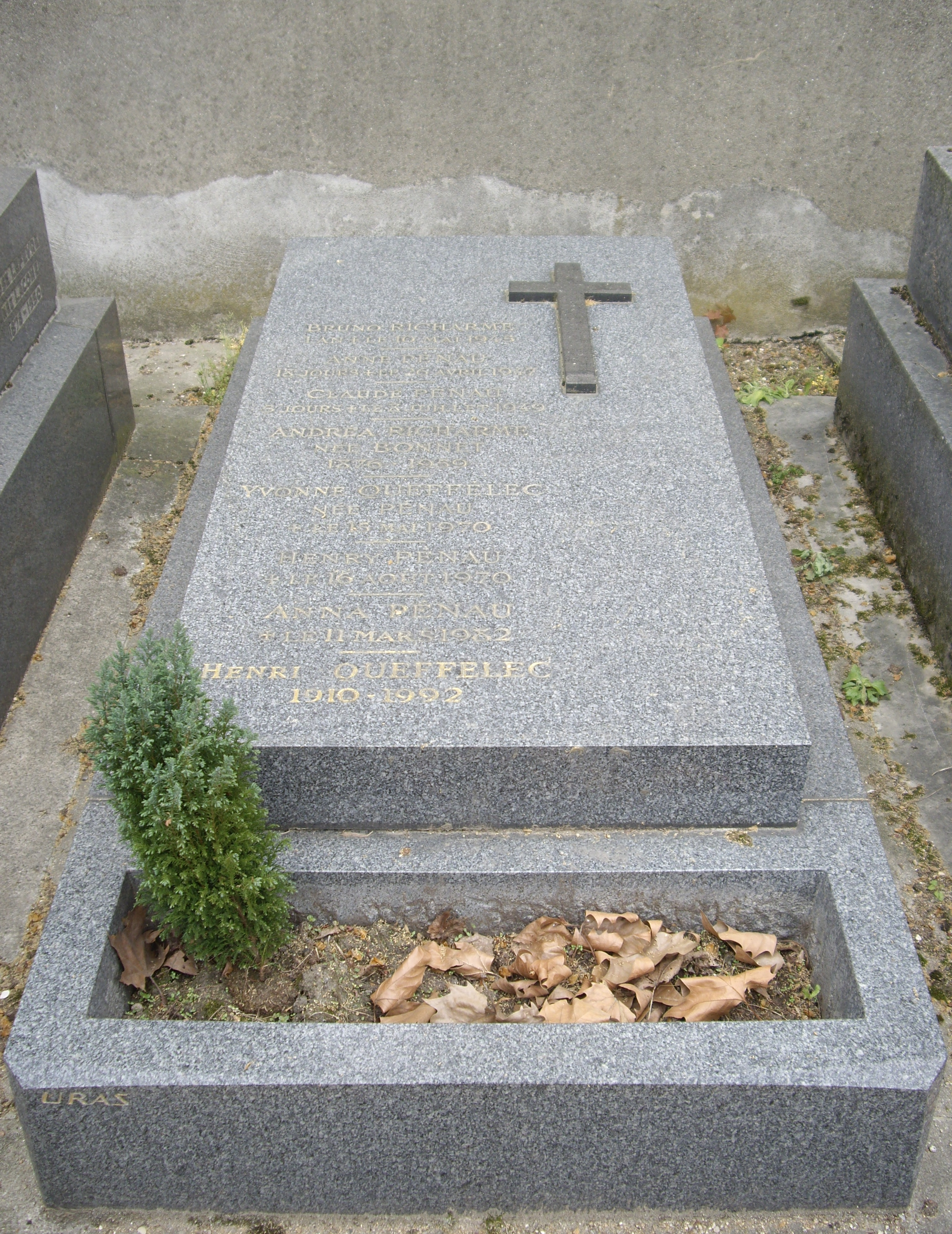
His grave in Montrouge Cemetery (Paris).
