= Yann Queffélec =

French writer

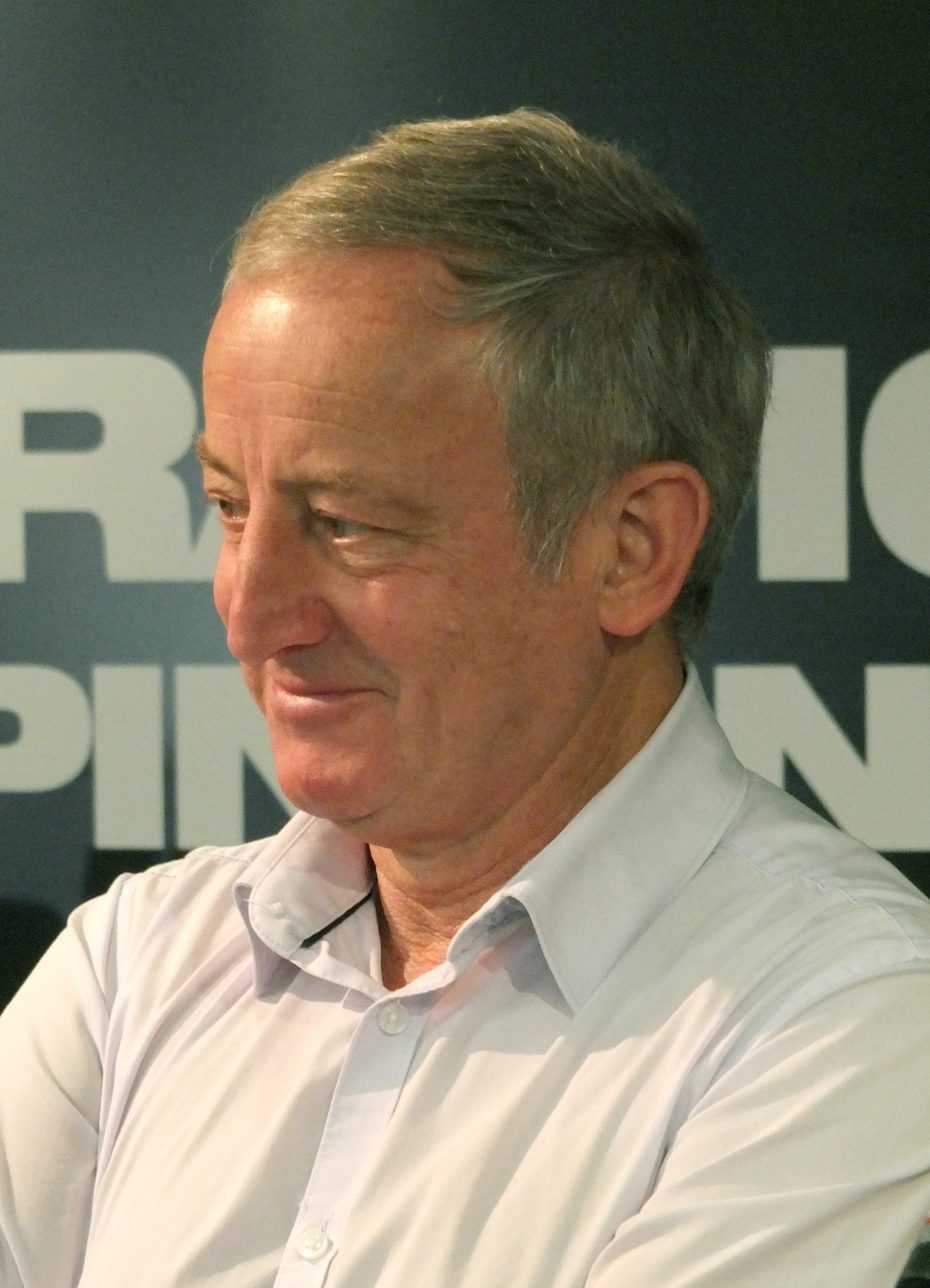
- Yann Queféllec (2013)
- Born: 4 September 1949 (age 76); Paris
- Occupation: Author
- Known for: Winner of Prix Goncourt
- Notable work: Les Noces barbares (1984)
- Partner: Brigitte Engerer
- Relatives: Anne Queffélec
- Awards: Prix Goncourt in 1985

Yann Queffélec (born 4 September 1949 in Paris) is a French author who won the Prix Goncourt in 1985 for his novel Les Noces barbares, translated into English as The Wedding or The Savage Wedding. He is the former husband of the late pianist Brigitte Engerer and the brother of musician Anne Queffélec. Their father was the writer Henri Queffélec.

== Partial bibliography ==
- Les Noces barbares (1984)
- Osmose (2000)
- The Sea (2003): coauthor with photographer Philip Plisson and Eliane Georges.
