= Société des gens de lettres =

French writers' association

The Société des gens de lettres de France (SGDLF; French: [sɔsjete dɛ ʒɑ̃ də lɛtʁ də fʁɑ̃s]; lit. 'Society of People of Letters of France') is a French writers' association founded in 1838 to defend and promote authors' rights. It provides legal and other support for its members and awards a number of significant prizes to French and francophone writers every year.

== Membership and organisation ==
Members of the society must be writers or translators whose work has been published by a publishing house (self-published works do not qualify). As of 2025, it represents approximately 6,000 writers.

It is directed by a volunteer committee consisting of twenty-four writers. As of 2025, the president is Cristophe Hardy, elected in 2020.

== History ==
In 1837, Louis Denoyers brought together a number of editors and writers to discuss founding a society for authors. The society was legally founded on 18 January 1838. Writers involved in the original founding included George Sand, Honoré de Balzac, Victor Hugo, and Alexandre Dumas.

The society was recognised in France as an establishment in the public interest by a decree of 10 December 1891.

Since 1928, the SGDLF's headquarters have been the 18th-century neoclassical Hôtel de Massa on rue de Faubourg-Saint-Jacques in the garden of the Observatoire de Paris in the 14th arrondissement of Paris.

== Purpose and activities ==
The society's purpose is to defend and promote the moral rights, legal interests, and social and legal status of all writers. It protects, considers, and proposes new rules and arrangements for the benefit of the community of writers.

The SGDLF offers social and legal assistance to its members. It has facilities for the deposit of completed works, helping writers guarantee their rights as original authors in case of a legal dispute. It organises various events and activities, including cultural exchanges with other countries.

Twice a year, the society awards a number of prizes to published French or francophone writers in the categories of fiction, non-fiction, books for children and young people, and poetry.

== Prizes awarded by the Société des gens de lettres ==
=== Spring session ===
- Prizes recognising the entire oeuvre of an author
  - Grand prix de littérature de la SGDL, founded in 1947
  - Grand prix de poésie de la SGDL, founded in 1983
  - Prix Paul Féval de littérature populaire, founded in 1984
- Prizes recognising a single work
  - Grand Prix SGDL du roman, founded in 1947
  - Grand Prix SGDL de la nouvelle, founded in 1984
  - Grand Prix SGDL du livre d'Histoire / Essai, founded in 1986
  - Grand Prix SGDL du livre Jeunesse, founded in 1982
  - Prix de poésie Charles Vildrac, founded in 1973
  - Grand Prix SGDL de l'œuvre Multimédia

=== Fall session ===
- Prizes recognising the entire oeuvre of an author
  - Grand Prix Poncetton de la SGDL, founded in 1970
  - Prix de Poésie Louis Montalte, founded in 1992
- Prizes recognising a single work
  - Grand Prix Thyde Monnier de la SGDL, founded in 1975
  - Bourses Thyde Monnier, since 1975
  - Bourses Poncetton
- Prizes for translation
  - Prix Halpérine-Kaminsky Consécration, since 1993
  - Prix Halpérine-Kaminsky Découverte, since 1993
  - Prix Gérard de Nerval
  - Prix Baudelaire
  - Prix Maurice-Edgar Coindreau

== See also ==
- French literature
- Academy
- Encyclopédistes
- Writers' organizations
