= Sannois =

- Commune
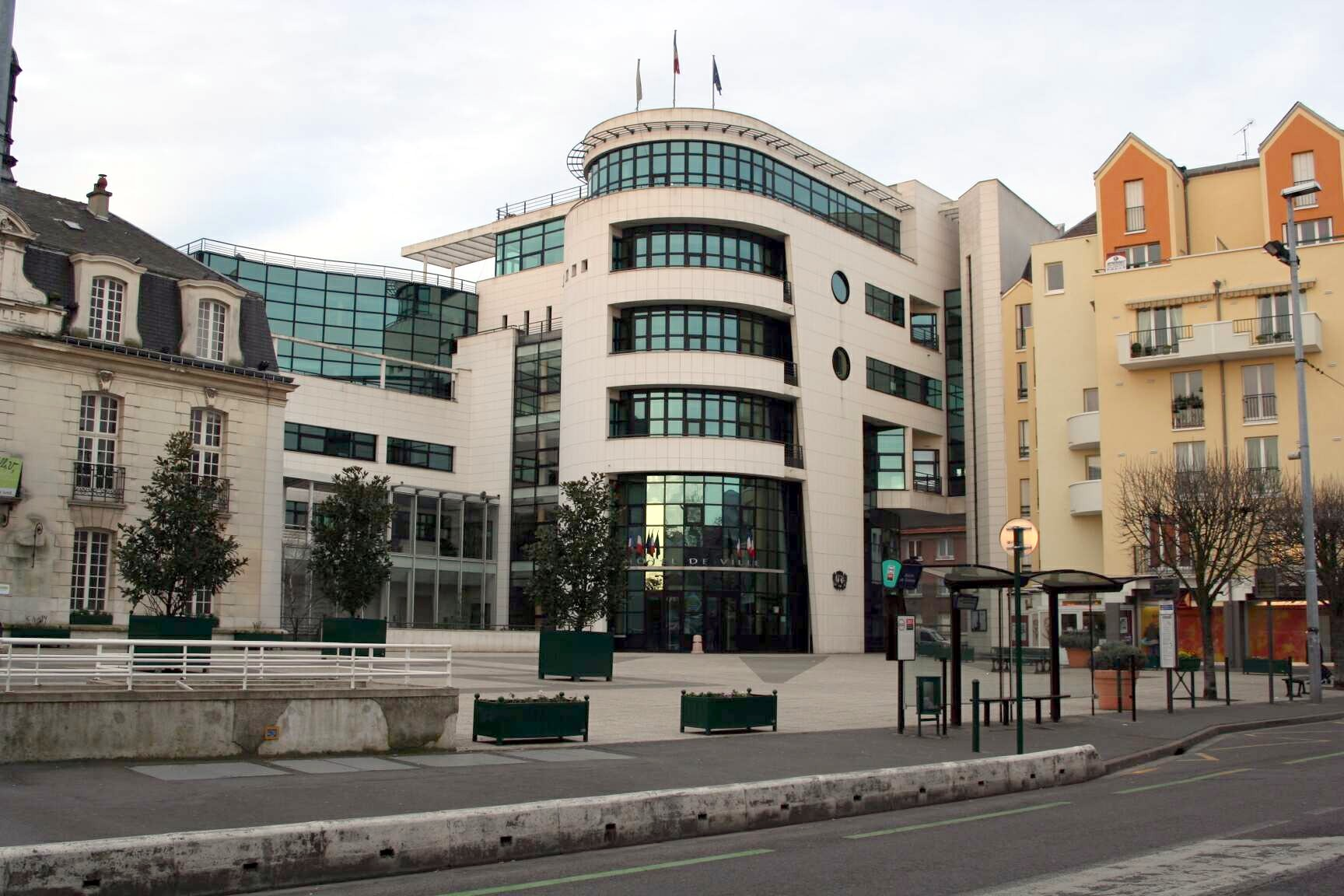
- The Hôtel de Ville

- Coat of arms

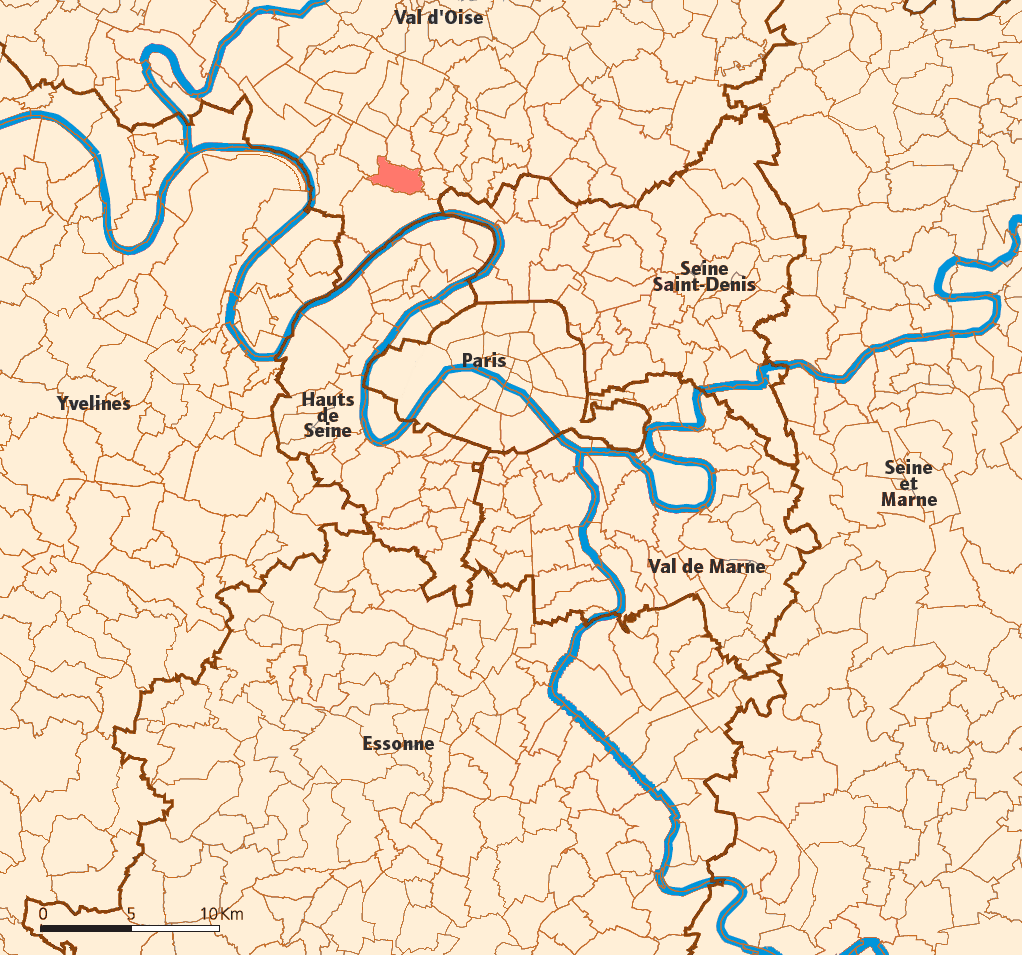
- Location (in red) within Paris inner and outer suburbs
- Location of Sannois
- Location within France Location within Île-de-France (region)
- Coordinates: 48°58′20″N 2°15′28″E
- Country: France
- Region: Île-de-France
- Department: Val-d'Oise
- Arrondissement: Argenteuil
- Canton: Argenteuil-1
- Intercommunality: CA Val Parisis

Government
  - Mayor (2020–2026): Bernard Jamet
- Area^{1}: 4.78 km^{2} (1.85 sq mi)
- Elevation: 56 m (184 ft)
- Highest elevation: 169 m (554 ft)
- Lowest elevation: 42 m (138 ft)
- Population (2023): 26,924
  - Density: 5,630/km^{2} (14,600/sq mi)
- Time zone: UTC+01:00 (CET)
  - Summer (DST): UTC+02:00 (CEST)
- INSEE/Postal code: 95582 /95110
- ^{1} French Land Register data, which excludes lakes, ponds, glaciers > 1 km^{2} (0.386 sq mi or 247 acres) and river estuaries.

Sannois (French pronunciation: [sanwa]) is a commune in the northwestern suburbs of Paris, France. It is located 15.2 km (9.4 miles) from the center of Paris, in the Val-d'Oise department in Île-de-France in northern France.

== History ==
The Hôtel de Ville was completed in 1994.

== Population ==
Historical population

Year	Pop.	±% p.a.
1793	1,624	—
1800	1,593	−0.27%
1806	1,734	+1.42%
1821	1,495	−0.98%
1831	1,622	+0.82%
1836	1,611	−0.14%
1841	1,603	−0.10%
1846	1,632	+0.36%
1851	1,547	−1.06%
1856	1,576	+0.37%
1861	2,041	+5.31%
1866	2,220	+1.70%
1872	2,489	+1.92%
1876	2,727	+2.31%
1881	3,175	+3.09%
1886	3,572	+2.38%
1891	3,857	+1.55%
1896	4,401	+2.67%
1901	4,905	+2.19%

Year	Pop.	±% p.a.
1906	5,324	+1.65%
1911	6,249	+3.26%
1921	7,506	+1.85%
1926	9,092	+3.91%
1931	11,757	+5.28%
1936	11,433	−0.56%
1946	12,368	+0.79%
1954	13,644	+1.23%
1962	16,490	+2.40%
1968	19,060	+2.44%
1975	18,578	−0.37%
1982	21,665	+2.22%
1990	25,229	+1.92%
1999	25,349	+0.05%
2007	25,975	+0.31%
2012	26,600	+0.48%
2017	26,662	+0.05%
2023	26,924	+0.16%

Source: EHESS and INSEE (1968-2023)

== Transport ==
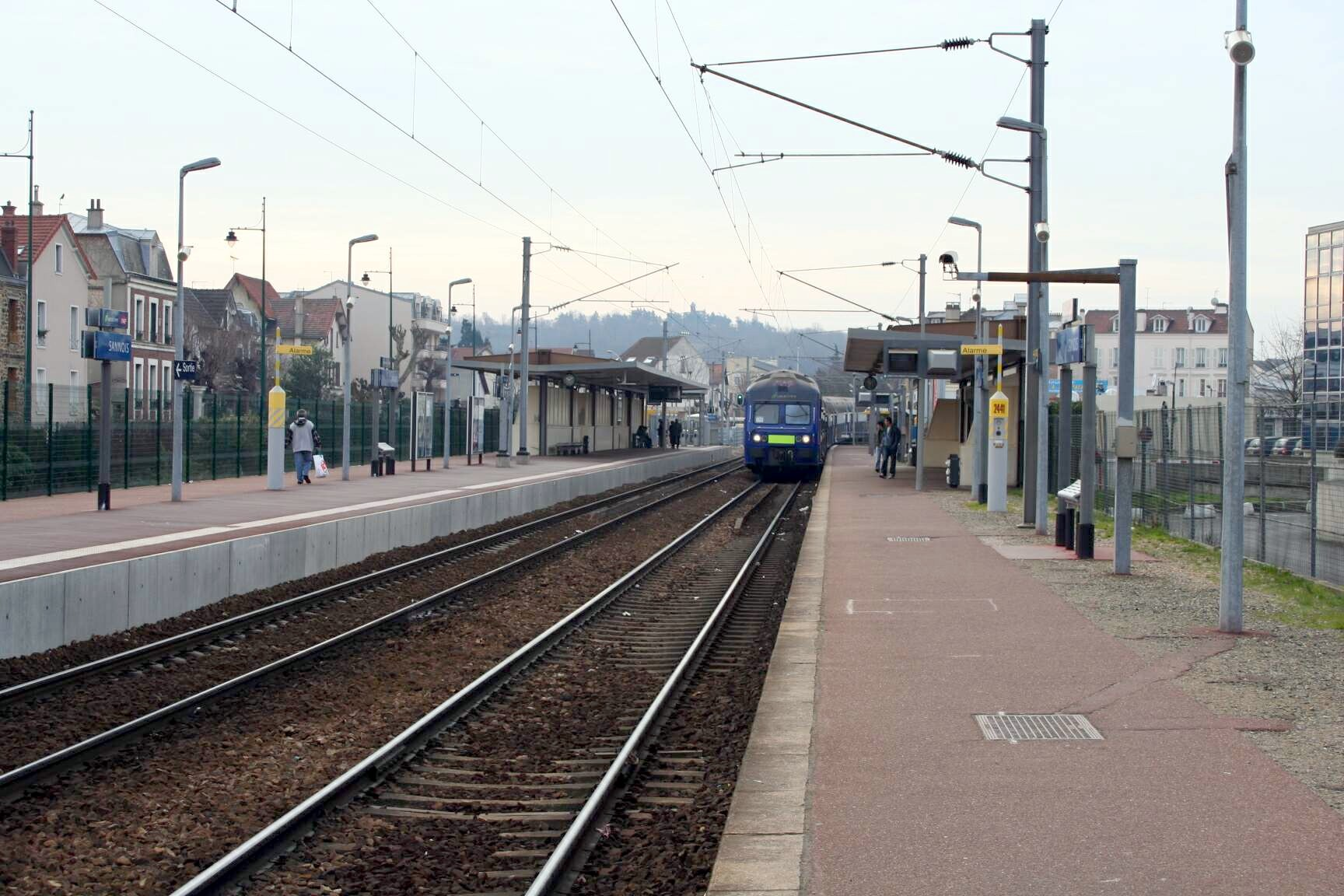
Sannois railway station

=== Public transport ===
Sannois is served by Sannois station on the Transilien Paris-Saint-Lazare suburban rail line.

=== Roads ===
Sannois is served by the A15 and A115 motorways and the N14 national road between Paris, Pontoise and Normandy.

== Sport ==
Sannois is home to the Parc des Sports Michel Hidalgo, where the local football team L'Entente SSG play their home games in France's Championnat National.

== Points of interest ==
- The windmill, built in the 18th century, was classified as a monument historique by the French Ministry of Culture in 1975.
- Jardin botanique de Sannois des Plantes Médicinales

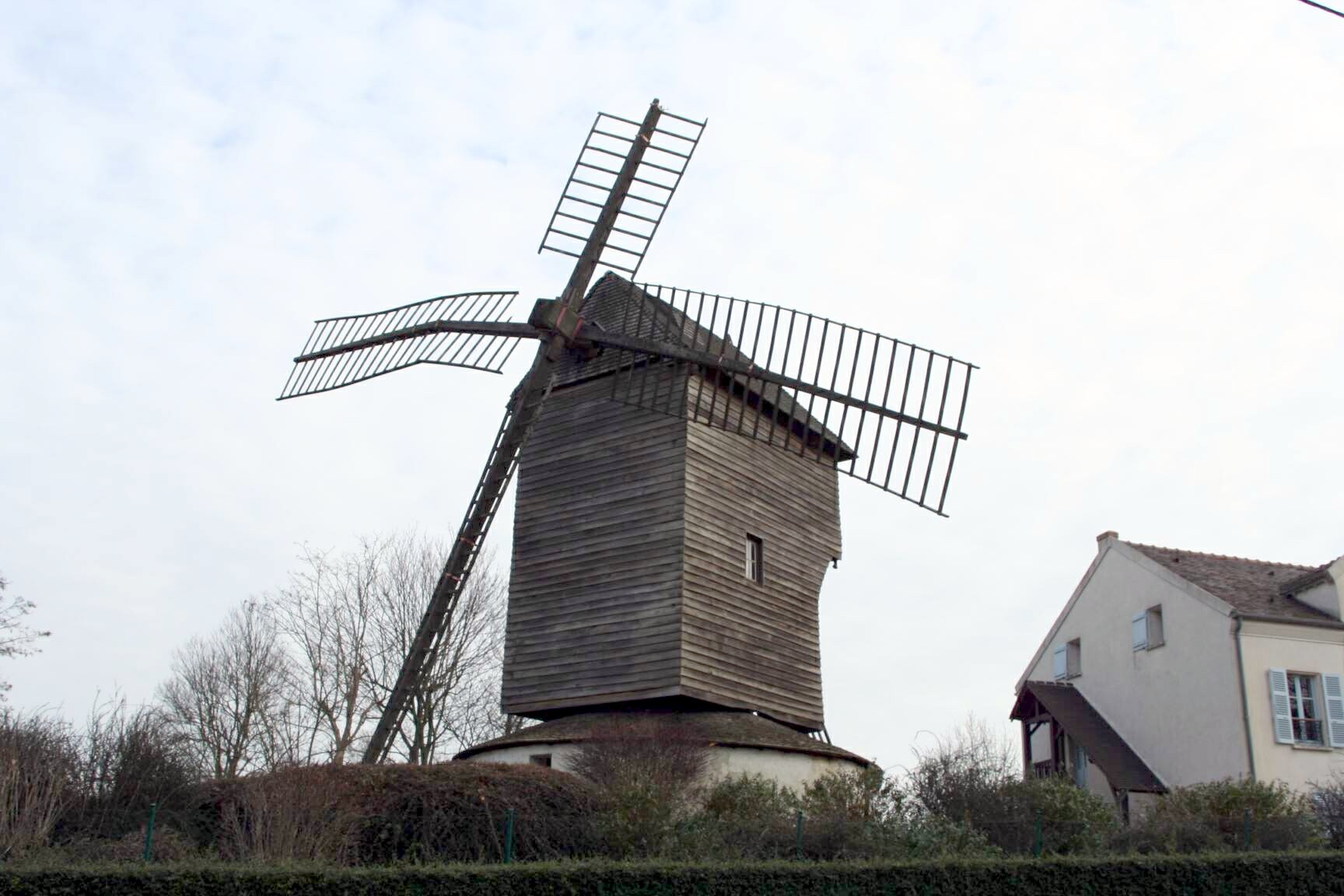
The windmill known as Moulin Trouillet

== Notable people ==
- Cyrano de Bergerac is said to have died in Sannois.

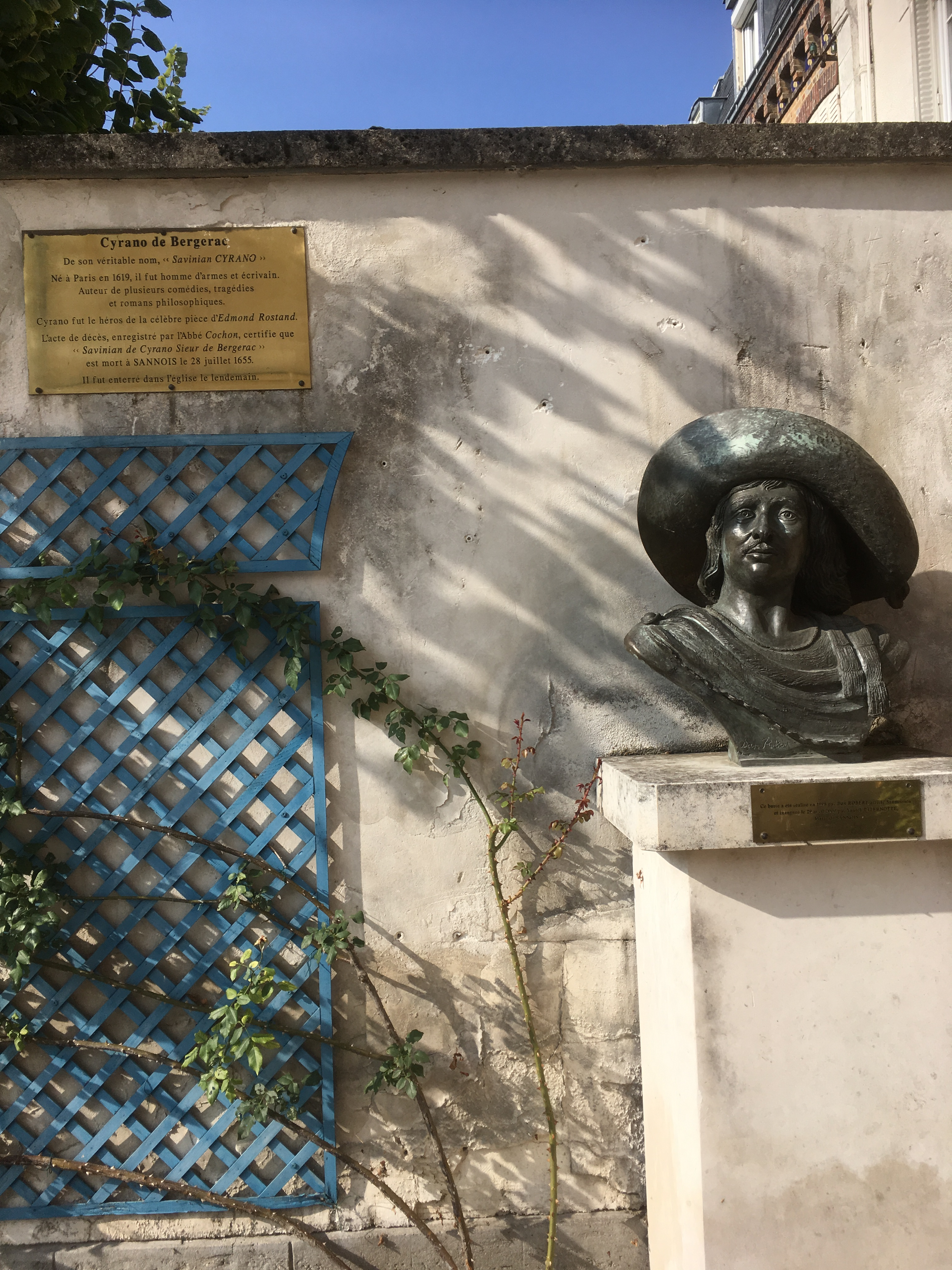
Bust of Cyrano de Bergerac in Sannois, near Paris

- François Magendie (1783–1855), physiologist, died in Sannois
- Louis de Robert (1871–1937), winner of the Prix Femina in 1911 died in Sannois.

== See also ==
- Communes of the Val-d'Oise department
