= Jacques Morel =

Jacques Morel may refer to:

- Jacques Morel (writer) (19th/20th-century), French writer
- Jacques Morel (actor) (1922–2008), French actor
- Jacques Morel (rower) (born 1935), French rower
- Jacques Morel (politician) (born 1948), Belgian Ecolo politician
- Jacques Morel (artist) (1395–1459), French sculptor
- Jacques Morel (composer) (c. 1700 – 1749), French composer and viol player
