= Edmond Pottier =

French art historian & archaeologist (1855-1934)

Edmond François Paul Pottier (13 August 1855, Saarbrücken – 4 July 1934, Paris) was an art historian and archaeologist who was instrumental in establishing the Corpus vasorum antiquorum. He was a pioneering scholar in the study of Ancient Greek pottery.

He was born in Saarbrücken, Rhineland. The son of a civil engineer he won a place at the Lycée Condorcet and went on to study at the École Normale Supérieure and the École d'Athènes. His thesis was on the subject of the chronology of Athenian archons. It was during his tenure as a curator at the Louvre that he organised the first meeting of the Union Académique Internationale aimed at establishing the complete corpus of Greek vases held in the national collections of every nation in 1919, the Corpus vasorum antiquorum. He produced the first fascicule for the Louvre in 1922.

Under the pseudonym Jacques Morel his wife was a writer who won the 1912 Prix Femina with the book Feuilles mortes.

== Published works ==
In 1908 his book on the vase painter Douris, Douris et les peintres des vases grecs, was translated into English and published as "Douris and the painters of Greek vases". Other noteworthy works by Pottier include:

- Étude sur les lécythes blancs attiques à représentations funéraires, 1883 – Study on the white lekythoi of Attica.
- La nécropole de Myrina: recherches archéologiques exécutées au nom et aux frais de l'École française d'Athènes, 1887 (with Salomon Reinach; A. Veyries; École française d'Athènes) – The necropolis at Myrina: archaeological research performed on behalf of the French School of Athens.
- Les Statuettes de terre cuite dans l'antiquité, 1890 – Terracotta statuettes of ancient times.
- Vases antiques du Louvre, 2 volumes, 1897-1901 – Antique vases of the Louvre.
- Diphilos et les modeleurs de terres cuites grecques, 1908 – Diphilos and Greek terracotta modelers.
- Le dessin chez les grecs d'après les vases peints, 1926 – Greek design in regards to its painted vases.
- L'art hittite, 2 volumes, 1926-31 – Hittite art.
