= Louise Bellocq =

Louise Bellocq, real name Marie-Louise Boudât, (20 January 1919, Charleville-Mézières – 25 August 1999) was a 20th-century French woman of letters born in a family of Béarn origin. She was awarded the Prix Fémina in 1960.

== Biography ==
Before the Second World War, she published three volumes of verse under her real name. She returned to settle in Pau in the family home after setbacks of fortune and held a boarding house. In 1955, she published a novel, La Ferme de l'Ermitage, the first version of which was written for a contest organized by La Semaine de Suzette read by her daughter. She also wrote children's books. In 1960, she won the Prix Fémina for La Porte retombée.

The awarding of this literary prize led to severe criticism of Beatrix Beck, but Louise Bellocq was defended by Dominique Rolin, and Beatrix Beck presented her resignation from the jury.

== Works ==
- 1952: Le Passager de la Belle aventure
- 1955: La Ferme de l'ermitage
- 1960: La Porte retombée, Éditions Gallimard, Prix Femina
- 1963: Mesdames Minnigan
- 1964: Conte de mes bêtes sous la Lune
- 1968: Conte de mes bêtes à l'aventure
