= Victoria Sabetai =

Greek classical Archaeologist

Victoria Sabetai is a member of the Research Centre for Antiquity at the Academy of Athens where she is principally involved with research for the Corpus Vasorum Antiquorum, a project aiming to publish ancient Greek pottery in museums and private collections.

She is a graduate of the University of Cincinnati, 1993.

== Selected publications ==
- The Washing Painter. A Contribution to the Wedding and Genre Iconography in the Second Half of the Fifth Century B.C. Ann Arbor: University Microfilms, 1994. Thesis (Ph. D.) University of Cincinnati, 1993.
- Corpus Vasorum Antiquorum. Greece, Fascicle 6: Thebes, Archaeological Museum I. Athens: Research Centre for Antiquity of the Academy of Athens, 2001. ISBN 9607099931.
- Corpus Vasorum Antiquorum. Greece, Athens, Benaki Museum. Athens: Research Centre for Antiquity of the Academy of Athens, 2006. ISBN 9789604041015
