= Irène Monesi =

French writer

Irène Monesi is a French writer. She won the 1966 Prix Femina.

Her novels concerned the problems of lesbian relationships.

== Works ==
- 1957: Althia: roman, Éditions du Seuil
- 1960; Cet acte tendre: roman, Corréa
- 1963: Les Bandrilles, Buchet/Chastel, P. Owen
- 1963: Les Pères insolites, Buchet/Chaste
- 1964: Le Faux-fuyant : roman, Buchet-Chastel
- 1966: Nature morte devant la fenêtre, Mercure de France, Prix Femina
- 1968: Une Tragédie superflue, roman., Paris: Mercure de France
- 1971: Un peuple de colombes, Mercure de France
- 1972: Vie d'une bête; récit. Mercure de France
- 1974: L'Amour et le Dédain Mercure de France
- 1977: Les Mers profondes Mercure de France
- 1981: La Voie lactée Gallimard
- 1985: Le Parcours du brigadier Sonloup Gallimard
