= Hôtel de Ville, Sannois =

Town hall in Sannois, France

Hôtel de Ville
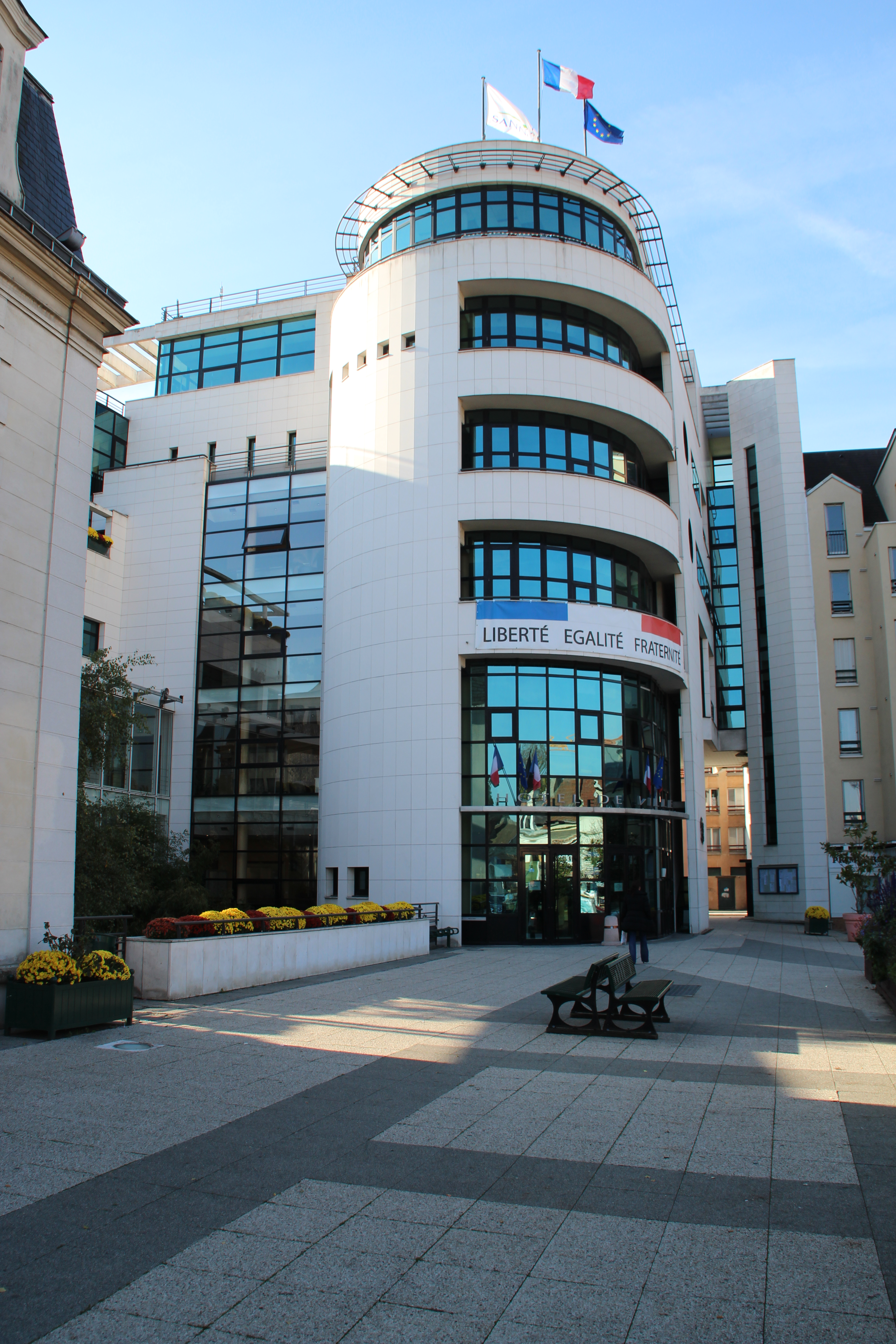
- The main frontage of the Hôtel de Ville in October 2012
- Interactive map of the Hôtel de Ville area

General information
- Type: City hall
- Architectural style: Modern style
- Location: Sannois, France
- Coordinates: 48.9717°N 2.2564°E
- Completed: 1992

The Hôtel de Ville (French pronunciation: [otɛl də vil], City Hall) is a municipal building in Sannois, Val-d'Oise, in the northwestern suburbs of Paris, standing on Place du Général Leclerc.

== History ==
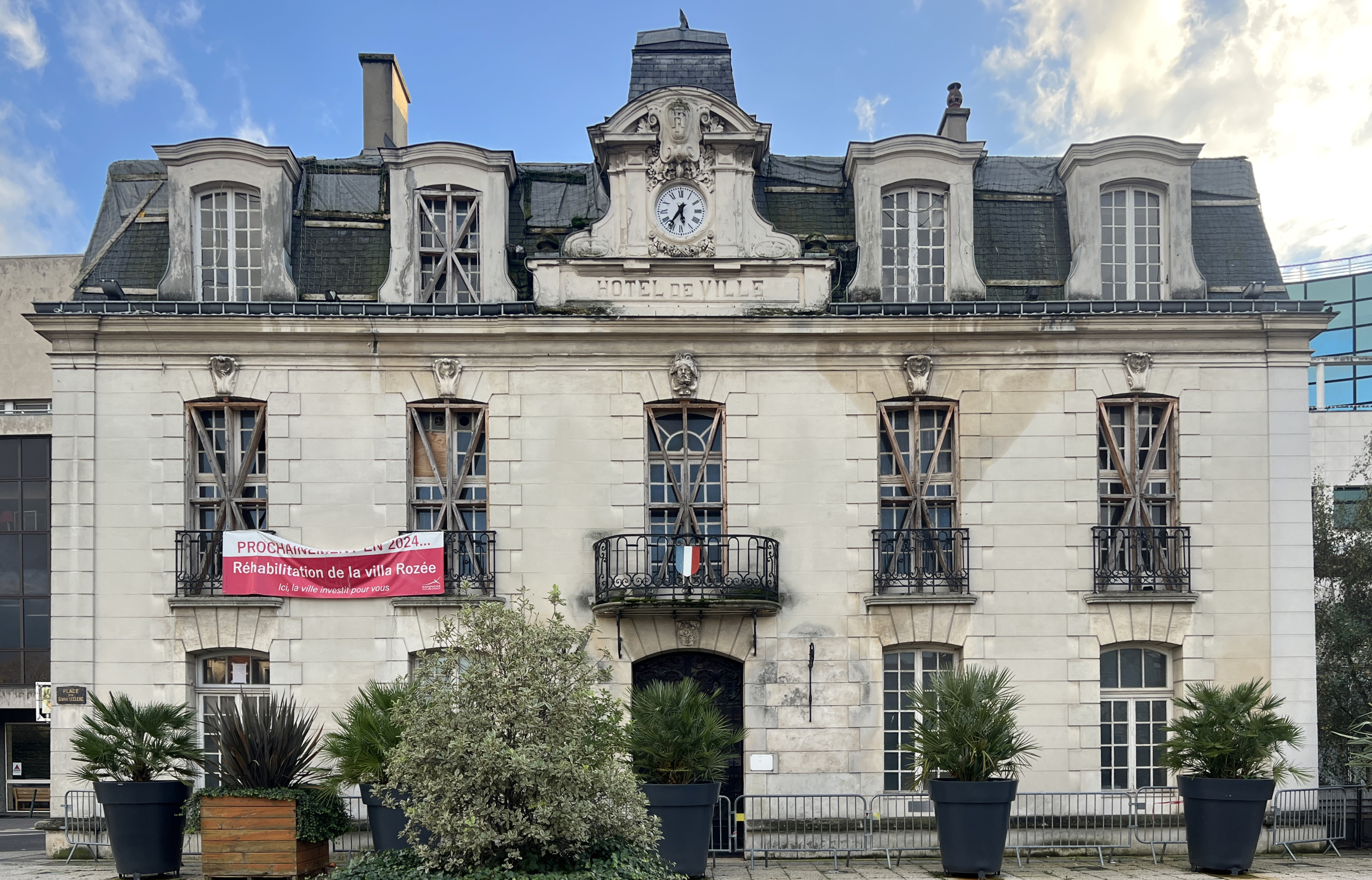
The old town hall

Following the French Revolution, the town council initially met in the house of the mayor at the time. This arrangement continued until the early 1880s when the council decided to acquire a dedicated building for their meetings. The building they selected was a villa on the south side of the market square (now Place du Général Leclerc). The building was designed in the neoclassical style, built in ashlar stone and was completed in the 18th century. After being owned by a succession of people, it was acquired by the council and officially re-opened as the town hall by the deputy mayor, Gabriel Rozée, on 15 June 1884.

The design of the building, which became known as Villa Rozée, involved a symmetrical main frontage of five bays facing onto the square. The central bay featured a segmental headed doorway with voussoirs and a keystone on the ground floor, a segmental headed French door with a balcony, voussoirs and a keystone on the first floor, and a clock above. There was a square-shaped belfry behind the clock. The other bays were fenestrated in a similar style but with dormer windows at attic level.

After the old town hall was no longer required for municipal use, it was converted to serve as the Utrillo-Valadon Museum. The museum exhibited the works of the painter, Maurice Utrillo, and his mother Suzanne Valadon, who became the first woman painter admitted to the Société Nationale des Beaux-Arts (National Society of Fine Arts). It was officially opened by the mayor, Yanick Paternotte, in 1995. Due to concerns over the structural integrity of the building, the museum closed in May 2018. Work to stabilise the structure and to covert the building into a multifunctional space started in November 2025. The work involved the installation of new double-glazed widows, new heating equipment and a new ventilation system, as well as the creation of a new Salle des Mariages (wedding room) on the ground floor. The works, which were budgeted to cost €3.1 million, were scheduled to be completed in September 2026.

In the late 1980s, following significant population growth, the council led by the mayor, André Cancelier, decided to commission a new town hall. The site they selected was immediately to the west of the old town hall. The new building was designed in the modern style, built in concrete and glass and was officially opened on 15 June 1994. The design of the six-storey building featured a prominent semicircular section which was projected forward onto the square. The building was clad in alternating bands of white panelling and dark-framed windows.
