= Michel Dard =

French writer

Michel Dard (1908, Pas-de-Calais – 3 July 1979) was a French writer and winner of the Prix Femina, 1973, for his novel Juan Maldonne.

== Biography ==
Michel Henry Marie Joseph Dard is the son of Henry Dard, mayor of Aire-sur-la-Lys and a historian of the town.

In the 1920s, he served as president of the Fédération nationale des étudiants d'Action française.

He won the Prix Femina in 1973 for his novel Juan Maldonne. The following year, he was elected to the Académie d'Arras.

His poetry collection Irréversibles (1976) won the Broquette-Gonin Prize in 1977.
