= Disturbance: Surviving Charlie Hebdo =

2018 book by Philippe Lançon

- Author: Philippe Lançon
- Original title: Le Lambeau
- Language: French
- Genre: memoir
- Publisher: Éditions Gallimard
- Publication date: 12 April 2018
- Publication place: France
- English publication date: 2019
- Pages: 512
- ISBN: 9782072689079

Disturbance: Surviving Charlie Hebdo (French: Le Lambeau) is a 2018 memoir by the French writer Philippe Lançon.

== Summary ==
Philippe Lançon is a French critic and novelist. He does freelance work for the satire magazine Charlie Hebdo and was severely injured in the Charlie Hebdo shooting on 7 January 2015, when two gunmen claiming allegiance to ISIS entered an editorial meeting at the magazine's office, killing twelve people and injuring another eleven. The book is Lançon's personal account of the attack, its impact on the affected, and his own road to recovery, spending months in a hospital where surgeons tried to reconstruct the third of his face that had been blown off by bullets.

== Reception ==
The New York Times called the book "a powerful and deeply civilized memoir". The Guardian wrote that there is a "disturbing contrast" between the brutal event and Lançon's subtle way of writing, describing the latter as "a characteristic response of a Parisian intellectual" and "remarkably free of anger at either the Kouachis or the ideology that inspired them". Kirkus Reviews stressed the many references to literature and how Lançon responds calmly to the event and its impact, resulting in a book about "how quiet resolution can reclaim and restore", although at the end of the book Lançon admits a "mild anxiety about standing near Arabs on a public bus".

The book was awarded the Prix Femina.
