= Louise Hervieu =

French painter

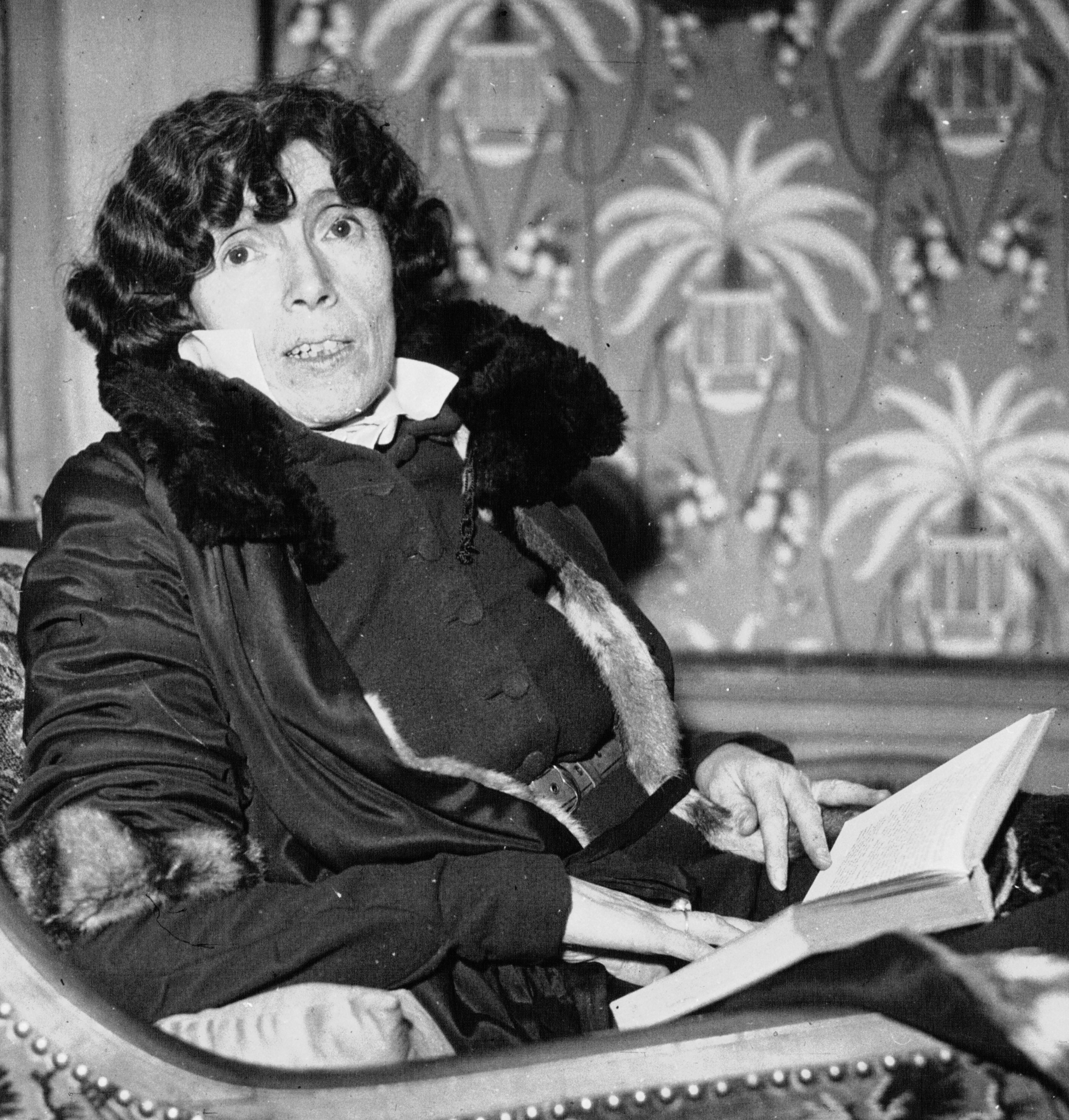
- Louise Hervieu in 1936
- Born: 26 October 1878; Alençon
- Died: 11 September 1954 (aged 75); Versailles

Louise Hervieu (French pronunciation: [lwiz ɛʁvjø]; 26 October 1878 – 11 September 1954) was a French writer, artist, painter, draftsman, and lithographer.

== Biography ==
Syphilitic of birth, of very fragile health, Louise Hervieu revealed a gift for drawing from her childhood. Discouraged after the failure of her unique exhibition of paintings in oil in 1910, she abandoned painting in favour of drawing and lithography. She illustrated les Fleurs du mal and le Spleen de Paris by Baudelaire. She published collections of drawings and novels that she embellished with her illustrations. She was close to the painter Edmond-Marie Poullain, with whom she travelled several times to Bréhal. In 1915, the weakening of her sight forced her to go from colour to black and white. A refined valorist, her technique of drawing in the wash or charcoal was characterized by the removal of certain parts of the surface of the work to obtain clear nuances by making the white of the paper reappear.

One of her works, le Bon Vouloir, was crowned by the Académie française and another one, Sangs, was awarded the prix Femina in 1936. This award allowed her to give great publicity to the battle she led throughout her life against this scourge that made her suffer constantly.

It is to Louise Hervieu that is also owed the attribution, obtained from a hard struggle in 1938, of a "health notebook", by the public authorities, to every newborn child, and in which would have been inscribed the antecedents of the parents, then all the care, all the diseases of the child, and then of the adult until his/her death, to serve in turn to keep his/her children and grandchildren healthy.

The Association Louise Hervieu for the establishment of the health notebook, was created for this purpose. On 1 June 1939, finally, a ministerial decree instituted the health card for the use of French citizens. This notebook unfortunately only had an ephemeral existence.

A retrospective of her works with those of Suzanne Valadon and Marie-Anne Camax-Zoegger was organised at the Musée Galliera of Paris, in 1961.

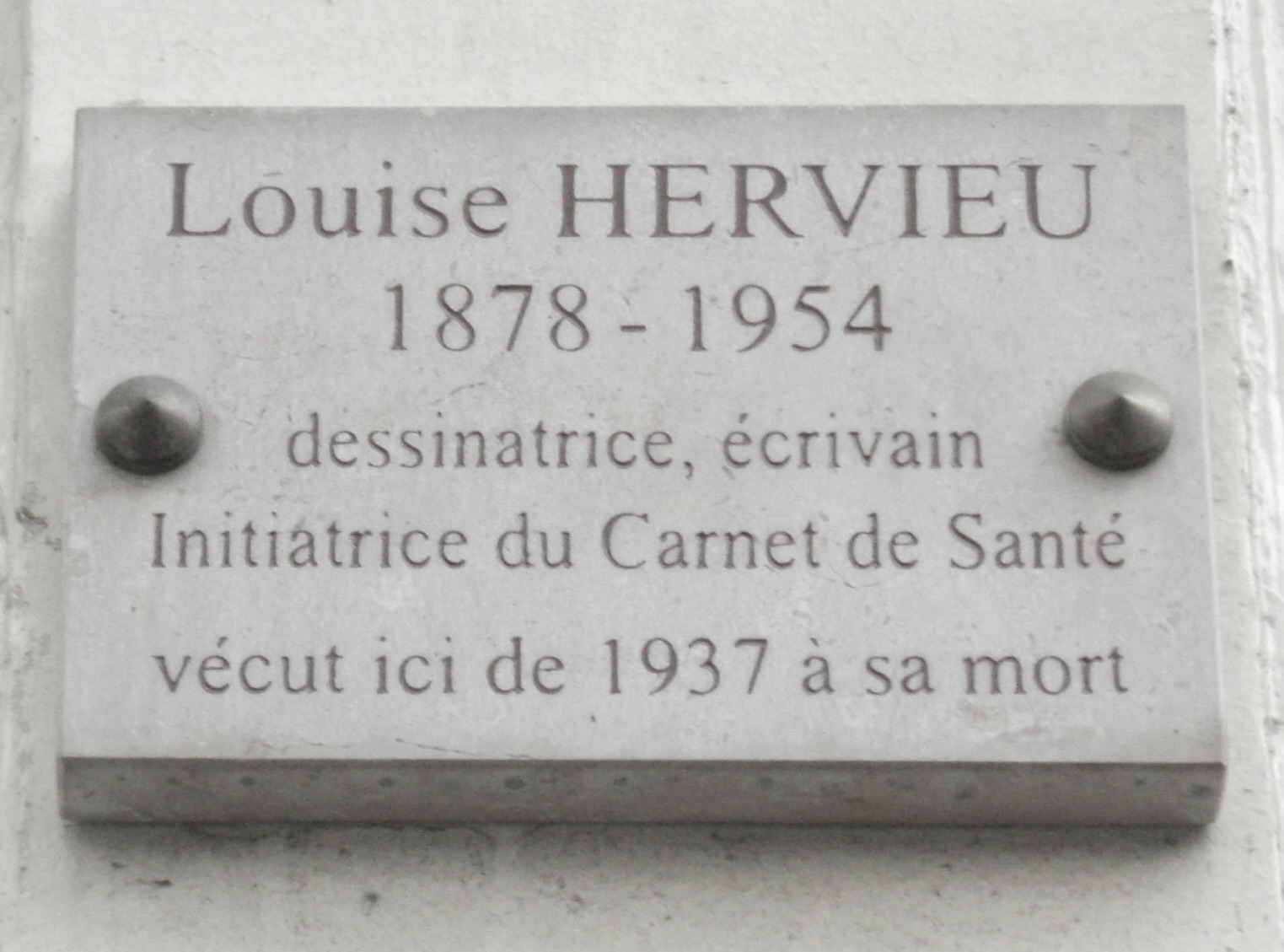
Plaque at number 55 rue du Cherche-Midi in the 6th arrondissement of Paris.

The rue Louise Hervieu, a street in the 12th arrondissement of Paris, pays homage to her. A commemorative plaque is placed on rue du Cherche Midi in the 6th arrondissement of Paris, at number 55, where she lived.

== Literary works ==
- 1921: Entretiens sur le dessin avec Geneviève, Bernheim-Jeune, Paris
- 1927: Le Bon Vouloir, Librairie de France, Paris, distinguished by the Académie française.
- 1924: L’Âme du cirque, illustrations by Edmond Heuzé, Librairie de France
- 1928: Montsouris, Émile-Paul frères, Paris
- 1936: Sangs, Éditions Denoël and Steele, Paris, prix Femina.
- 1937: Le Crime, Denoël
- 1942: Lettres à Lucy Krohg, Association
- 1943: Le malade vous parle, Denoël
- 1953: La Rose de sang, ou Le Printemps de la jeune Heredote, P. Cailler, Geneva

== Pictorial works ==
Illustrations

- Vingt nus, Librairie de France, Paris
- Les Fleurs du mal, Ollendorff, Paris, 1920
- Poèmes de Baudelaire, illustrations and foreword by Louise Hervieu, Textes Prétextes, Paris, 1946
- Réminiscences, Compagnie française des arts graphiques, Paris, 1946
- Liturgies intimes, Paul Verlaine, illustrations by Louise Hervieu, Éditions Manuel Bruker, 1948

Musée national d’Art moderne de Paris

- Dédié à Baudelaire, before 1922
- Le Christ enchainé de Suippes, before 1922
- Nu dans un intérieur renaissance, before 1925
- La madeleine et le philosophe, before 1927
- Nu dans un intérieur de style, before 1927
- Choix de coquillages, before 1931
- Fleurs de cerisier, 1934
- Tête de clown, 1934
- Noir sur noir, 1934
- Fruits, 1934
- Vieux dieux chinois, 1934
- Massacre de cerf, 1934
- La pendule, before 1939
- Les pommes, c. 1941
- Les poires, c. 1941
- Le salon du carnet de santé
- Plumes
- Femme malade

Musée du Louvre, département des arts graphiques

- Coquillages et colliers, RF 36812, recto
- Nœud noir et plume d'autruche blanche, RF 40961, recto
- Vieille paysanne assise, de face, en train de coudre, RF 28788, recto

== Bibliography ==
- Pierre Courthion, Panorama de la peinture française contemporaine, Simon Kra, 1927, (pp. 142–145)
- Claude Roger-Marx, Éloge de Louise Hervieu, Manuel Bruker Éditeur, 1953
- Guillaume d’Enfert, Louise Hervieu et Bretteville-sur-Ay. Hommage à Louise Hervieu, publié à l’occasion du 2e Salon des écrivains du terroir de Bretteville-sur-Ay, Éditions du Jardin d’Eden, 2004
- Sanchez Nelly, « Prix Femina 1936 : Sangs de Louise Hervieu », New Zealand Journal of French Studies, 2013, n°2, vol. 34, (pp. 41–54)
- Sanchez Nelly, « Louise Hervieu, dessinatrice et littératrice », La Corne de Brume, 2013, n°10, (pp. 41–46)
