= François-Régis Bastide =

French writer and diplomat (1926–1996)

François-Régis Bastide (French pronunciation: [fʁɑ̃swa ʁeʒis bastid]; 1 July 1926; Biarritz – 16 April 1996; Paris) was a French writer, diplomat, politician, and radio host.

== Early life ==
Bastide was born in Biarritz in the French Basque Country on 1 July 1926 and attended school in Bayonne. In October 1944 he joined the 2nd Armored Division led by General Leclerc and participated in the last phase of the WWII Western Front operations.

== Literary career ==
Bastide published his first book, the novel Lettre de Bavière, in 1947. He continued to publish books regularly and won the Grand Prix de la Critique for his 1953 biographical essay Saint-Simon par lui même about Louis de Rouvroy, duc de Saint-Simon and the Prix Femina for his 1956 novel Les Adieux. In 1953 Bastide began a parallel career as a book editor working for the Éditions du Seuil where he worked for close to thirty years. Bastide also wrote for the theatre (Siegfried 78) and for television (most notably Le Troisième concerto which won the Grand Prix de la Télévision in 1963 and L'Éducation sentimentale, a mini-series adaptation of Gustave Flaubert's novel Sentimental Education).

In 1981 Bastide received the Pierre de Régnier Prize of the Académie française for his lifetime achievements.

== Radio career ==
Bastide began his radio career after World War II as a host on "Radio Sarrebruck" then under French military control. Starting in 1949, he worked for the ORTF as a producer and host. He is perhaps best known to the wider French public as one of the original co-hosts (with Michel Polac) of the popular radio talk-show Le Masque et la Plume. The show which features debates about cinema, literature and theatre debuted in 1955 and is still running today on France Inter. Bastide left the show in 1982.

== Political career ==
Throughout his life, Bastide was active in politics in various ways. From 1968 to 1976, he was the president of the radio producers and presenters section of the powerful CFDT trade union. He was close to the Socialist Party which he represented as a city councillor in Biarritz in 1977 and as a national delegate in 1978. He also co-authored the 1978 "Bastide report" which led four years later to the creation of the Haute Autorité de la communication audiovisuelle.

After the election of François Mitterrand in the 1981 presidential election he began a diplomatic career and was successively appointed Ambassador to Denmark (1982–85), Ambassador to Austria (1985–88) and Permanent delegate to UNESCO (1988–90).

== Bibliography ==
The following list may be incomplete

=== Novels and short stories ===
- Lettre de Bavière, 1947
- La Troisième Personne, 1948
- La Jeune Fille et la mort, 1950
- La Lumière et le fouet, 1951
- Les Adieux, Prix Femina 1956 (an English translation Les Adieux was published in 1958 by Simon & Schuster)
- Flora d'Amsterdam, 1957
- La Vie rêvée, 1962
- La Palmeraie, 1967
- La Forêt noire –
- La Fantaisie du voyageur, 1976
- L’Enchanteur et nous, 1981
- L’Homme au désir d’amour lointain, 1994

== Television screenplay ==
- La Forêt noire – Le troisième concerto, 1968

=== Essays ===
- Saint-Simon par lui-même, 1953 (biography of Louis de Rouvroy, duc de Saint-Simon)
- Suède, 1954
- Zodiaque, secrets et sortilèges, 1964

=== Theatre ===
- Siegfried 78, 1979

=== Children's books ===
- Joachim Quelque Chose, illustrations by Monica Bastide, 1959
- Alexis dans la Forêt-Foly, illustrations by Monica Bastide, 1970
