= Polina Panassenko =

French-Russian writer, translator, actor (b. 1989)

- In a 2026 interview
- Born: 3 March 1989 (age 37); Moscow, USSR
- Other name: Pauline Panassenko
- Education: Sciences-Po Paris
- Occupations: Writer, translator
- Known for: Tenir sa langue (Hold your tongue)

Polina Panassenko (born 3 March 1989) is a French-Russian writer, translator and actress. For her first novel, Tenir sa langue, she won the 2022 Femina des lycéens prize. On 18 November 2022, she was awarded one of the Emmanuèle Bernheim scholarships, to support the writing of her next novel.

== Biography ==
Polina Panassenko was born in 1989 in Moscow, in the Soviet Union (USSR). In 1993, her family emigrated to France, to Saint-Étienne where her mathematician-father Grigory Panassenko obtained a position at the university. She became a naturalized French citizen, her first name was changed to Pauline.

After studying at Sciences-Po Paris, she trained in dramatic art at the Comédie de Saint-Étienne and at the Moscow Art Theatre School-Studio (MKhAT).

In 2015, she published an investigation into five of her namesakes, all named Polina Grigorievna. In June 2018, she joined the Russian-speaking committee of the Maison Antoine Vitez.

At the start of the 2022 literary season, Panassenko published her first novel Tenir sa langue (Hold your tongue) with publisher Éditions de l'Olivier. The book was named a finalist for several accolades including the Prix Fémina and the Prix Wepler, in the selection of the Prix Les Inrockuptibles, the Prix Première 2023 and the Prix Médicis. On 2 December 2022, her book was awarded the Prix Femina des lycéens.

Tenir sa langue tells the story of a little girl named Polina after her grandmother Pessah, who was of Jewish religion but when faced with Antisemitism had to take this Russian first name. The day after the fall of the USSR, Polina's family arrived in France and her first name was Frenchified as "Pauline". The narrator is then confronted with a double identity: Polina at home, Pauline at school. This change of first name crystallizes her quest for identity between her two languages and her two countries to the point that she takes administrative action to recover her original first name: "What I want is to bear the first name I received at birth. Without hiding it, without disguising it, without changing it. Without being afraid of it." A journey in the opposite direction of so many others.

Panassenko is also the author of a short story, "There is no sex in the USSR", and of the play The Queen of Silence, directed by Arnaud Meunier at the Centre Dramatique National de Saint-Étienne.

== Awards and distinctions ==
- 2022: Finalist of the Prix Femina
- 2022: Selection for the Prix Médicis
- 2022: Selection for the Wepler Prize
- 2022: Winner of the Porte Dorée Literary Prize
- 2022: Winner of the second edition of the Emmanuèle Bernheim Scholarships.
- 2022: Femina High School Students’ Prize for Holding Your Tongue
