= Edmond Gojon =

French poet and writer (1886–1935)

Edmond Gojon (11 April 1886, in Philippeville, Algeria – 5 April 1935) was a 20th-century French poet and writer.

Originally from French Algeria, Gojon went back after his studies at Lycée Henri-IV in Paris. With former schoolmates he founded, in 1903, in Algiers, the magazine L’Essor. He then published, from the following year, collections of poems of parnassianist and symbolist inspiration. His first collection was noticed by José-Maria de Heredia. Gojon's Le Jardin des dieux was awarded the Prix Femina in 1920. He then left poetry to become the bard of French Algeria (En Algérie avec les Français, Cent ans d’efforts français en Algérie...). He then returned to poetry with two last collections: Le Marchand de nuages (1930) and L’Empire de Cérès (1933). He is finally known to have adapted J'accuse…! by Émile Zola for Abel Gance, in 1913 (see J'accuse (1919 film)).

== Works ==
- 1904: Antiquailles dorées
- 1907: Les Cendres de l'urne
- 1908: Poèmes de la douleur et de la solitude
- 1910: Le Visage penché
- 1912: La Grenade, Prix Archon-Despérouses of the Académie française
- 1913:Le Petit Germinet
- 1920: Le Jardin des dieux, Prix Femina
- 1927: En Algérie avec la France
- 1928: La légende de Barberousse, roi d’Alger
- 1930: Cent ans d'effort français en Algérie. Boufarik.
- 1932: Le Marchand de nuages, Prix Artigue of the Académie française
- 1933: L'Empire de Cérès
