= Régis Jauffret =

French writer

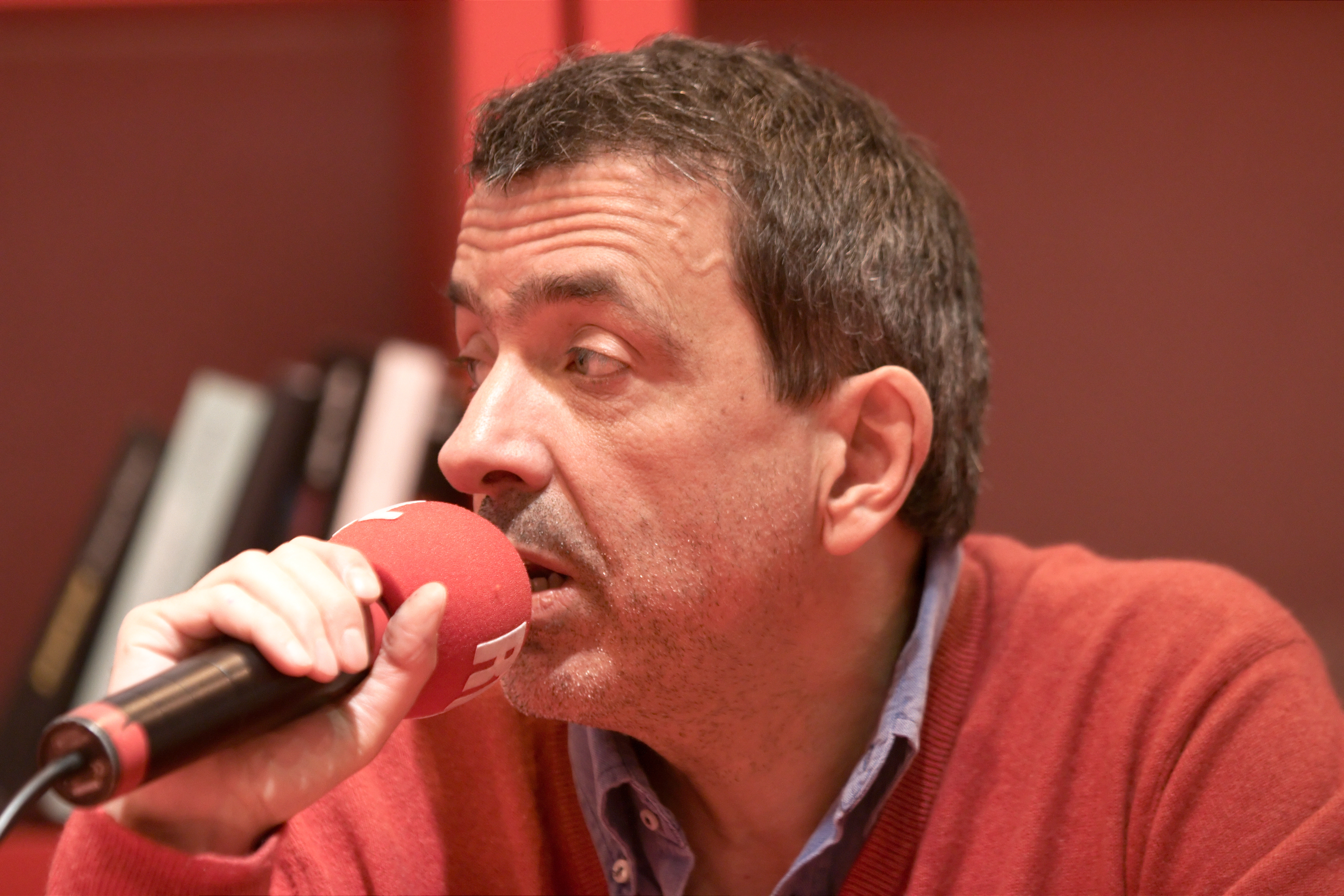
- Régis Jauffret on Paris book fair, 2010
- Writing career
- Language: French
- Notable work: Asile de fous
- Notable awards: Prix Femina

Régis Jauffret (French pronunciation: [ʁeʒis ʒofʁɛ]) is a French writer and winner of the Prix Femina, 2005, for Asiles de fous.

== Works ==
- Seule au milieu d'elle: roman, Denoël, 1985, ISBN 978-2-207-23146-3
- Les gouttes: pièce en un acte, Denoël, 1985, ISBN 978-2-207-23193-7
- Sur un tableau noir: roman, Gallimard, 1993, ISBN 978-2-07-072973-9
- Histoire d'amour, Gallimard, 1999, ISBN 978-2-07-040603-6
- Clémence Picot, Gallimard, 2000, ISBN 978-2-07-041091-0
- Cet extrême amour, Encre bleue éd., 2000, ISBN 978-2-84379-122-2
- Les jeux de plage: fictions, Gallimard, 2002, ISBN 978-2-84335-145-7
- Promenade, Gallimard, 2003, ISBN 978-2-07-042658-4
- L'enfance est un rêve d'enfant, Gallimard, 2004, ISBN 978-2-84335-212-6
- Univers, univers, Gallimard, 2005, ISBN 978-2-07-030091-4
- Asiles de fous, Gallimard, 2005, ISBN 978-2-07-077534-7
- Microfictions, Gallimard, 2007, ISBN 978-2-07-078317-5
- Lacrimosa: roman, Gallimard, 2008, ISBN 978-2-07-012204-2
- Ce que c'est que l'amour: et autres microfictions, Gallimard, 2009, ISBN 978-2-07-038774-8
- Stricte intimité, Editions Gallimard, 2009, ISBN 978-2-07-035979-0
- Sévère, Seuil, 2010, ISBN 978-2-02-102248-3
- Tibère et Marjorie, Le Seuil, 2010, ISBN 978-2-02-102250-6
- Claustria (Le Seuil, collection « Cadre rouge »), 2012, ISBN 978-2-02-102251-3
- La Ballade de Rikers Island (Le Seuil, collection « Cadre rouge »), 2014, ISBN 978-2-02-109759-7
- Cannibales (Le Seuil, collection « Cadre rouge »), 2016, ISBN 978-2-02-130995-9
- Papa (Le Seuil, collection « Cadre rouge »), 2020, ISBN 978-2-02-145035-4
- Le dernier bain de Gustave Flaubert (Le Seuil, collection « Cadre rouge »), 2021, ISBN 978-2-02-145366-9
