= Philippe Lançon =

French journalist (born 1963)

- Born: 1963 (age 62–63); Vanves, Hauts-de-Seine, France
- Education: Centre de Formation des Journalistes de Paris
- Occupation: Journalist
- Writing career
- Language: French
- Notable work: Disturbance: Surviving Charlie Hebdo
- Notable awards: Chevalier of the Ordre des Arts et des Lettres (2015); Jean-Luc Lagardère award for Journalist of the Year (2013)

Philippe Lançon (French: [filip lɑ̃sɔ̃]) is a journalist working for the French satirical weekly newspaper Charlie Hebdo, who was wounded in the terrorist attack perpetrated against that publication on 7 January 2015.

== Biography ==
Philippe Lançon, who holds a master's degree in European law and is a graduate of the Centre de formation des journalistes(CFJ) (class of 1986), is a journalist with the daily newspaper Libération, Article (publishing) and literary critic, with a particular passion for Latin American literature. For many years, he wrote the Television column Après coup, and helped launch the Portrait pages.

He is also a columnist for the weekly Charlie Hebdo and from the end of 2014 becomes a member of the “theater” panel of Le Masque et la Plume on France Inter.

On January 7, 2015, he was seriously injured during an Charlie Hebdo shooting, requiring four hours of major surgery on his face. He underwent up to 22 surgical procedures, including 13 jaw operations. In 2018, he recounts these events in a book entitled Disturbance: Surviving Charlie Hebdo and, on November 5, receives the 2018 Prix Femina for it.

== Work ==
Lançon works primarily for other French publications, specializing in literature. He is a weekly contributor to Charlie Hebdo.

Lançon also wrote for Libération, a newspaper in France, and is a critic of Latin American writings. He is also an educator on culture and Latin American literature, having been a guest speaker at Princeton University on occasion. In the Fall of 2015, he was expected to teach a course at Princeton titled "Writers and Dictators in Latin America."

== Publications ==
- 1998: Monography on the artist Jean Daviot, Victoire éditions, Paris
- 2004: Philippe Lançon (under the pseudonym Gabriel Lindero) (2004). Je ne sais pas écrire et je suis un innocent [I do not know how to write and I am an innocent]. Paris: Calmann-Lévy. p. 350. ISBN 978-2-7021-3428-3. Archived from the original on 22 October 2007.
- 2011: Philippe Lançon (2011). Les îles. Paris: Jean-Claude Lattès. ISBN 978-2-7096-3513-4.
- 2016: Preface to La Légèreté, by Catherine Meurisse, Dargaud, April 2016
- 2013: L'Élan, Paris, éditions Gallimard, series "Blanche", ISBN 978-2-07-014088-6
- 2018: Le Lambeau, Paris, éditions Gallimard, series "Blanche", 2018, 512 pages. ISBN 978-2-07268-907-9

== Terrorist attack ==
Lançon was attending a weekly meeting of Charlie Hebdo at the time of the attack on 7 January 2015. He was wounded in the face by rifle fire and was left in critical condition, but ultimately survived his injuries. Once assured of his survival after long medical treatment and therapy, he wrote his story in the book Disturbance: Surviving Charlie Hebdo (French: Le Lambeau), for which he received two literary prizes in France.

== Decorations ==
- Chevalier of the Ordre des Arts et des Lettres (2015)

== Honours ==
In 2012, he was awarded the Prix Henri de Régnier of the Académie française for his work Les Îles.

In 2013, he received the Jean-Luc Lagardère Award for Journalist of the Year.

In 2018, he was awarded the Prix Femina and the Prix Renaudot Jury's Special Prize for his autobiographical book Le Lambeau.
