= Marie Le Franc =

French writer (1879–1964)

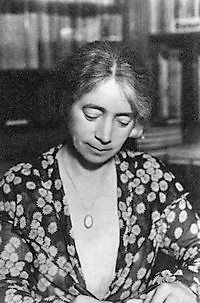
- Born: 4 October 1879 Sarzeau, France
- Died: 29 December 1964 (aged 85) Saint-Germain-en-Laye, France
- Genre: Poetry, novel, essay

Marie Le Franc (French pronunciation: [maʁi l(ə) fʁɑ̃]; 4 October 1879 – 29 December 1964) was a French-born writer who found much of her inspiration in Canada.

The daughter of a customs officer, she was born in Sarzeau and was educated at the École des soeurs de Sarzeau in Morbihan and at the École normale de Vannes, receiving her teaching diploma. She taught school in Morbihan for several years and then came to Montreal in 1906, where she planned to marry Arsène Bessette. The marriage never happened but Le Franc continued to teach in the region. She returned to France in 1929 but continued to visit Canada until 1958.

She published two volumes of poetry Les Voix du cœur et de l'âme (1920) and Les Voix de misère et d'allégresse, as well as novels and short stories. Her 1925 novel Grand-Louis l'innocent won the French Prix Femina. Her work also appeared in Le Mercure de France, the Album universel and Les Carnets viatoriens.

Le Franc was named a Chevalier in the French Legion of Honour in 1953.

She died in Saint-Germain-en-Laye at the age of 85.

Lac Marie-Le Franc in the Papineau-Labelle Wildlife Reserve was named in her honour in 1934.

== Selected works ==
- Le Poste sur la dûne, novel (1928)
- Hélier: fils des bois, novel (1930)
- Grand-Louis le Revenant, novel (1930)
- Au pays canadien-français, essay (1931), received the Prix Montyon from the Académie française
- Dans l'île. Roman d'Ouessant, novel (1932)
- Visages de Montréal, stories (1934?)
- La Rivière solitaire, novel (1934)
- La Randonnée passionnée, novel (1936)
- Les Pêcheurs de Gaspésie, novel (1938)
- O Canada, Terre de nos aïeux !, stories (1947)
- Le Fils de la forêt, novel (1952)
