= Anne-Marie Garat =

French novelist (1946–2022)

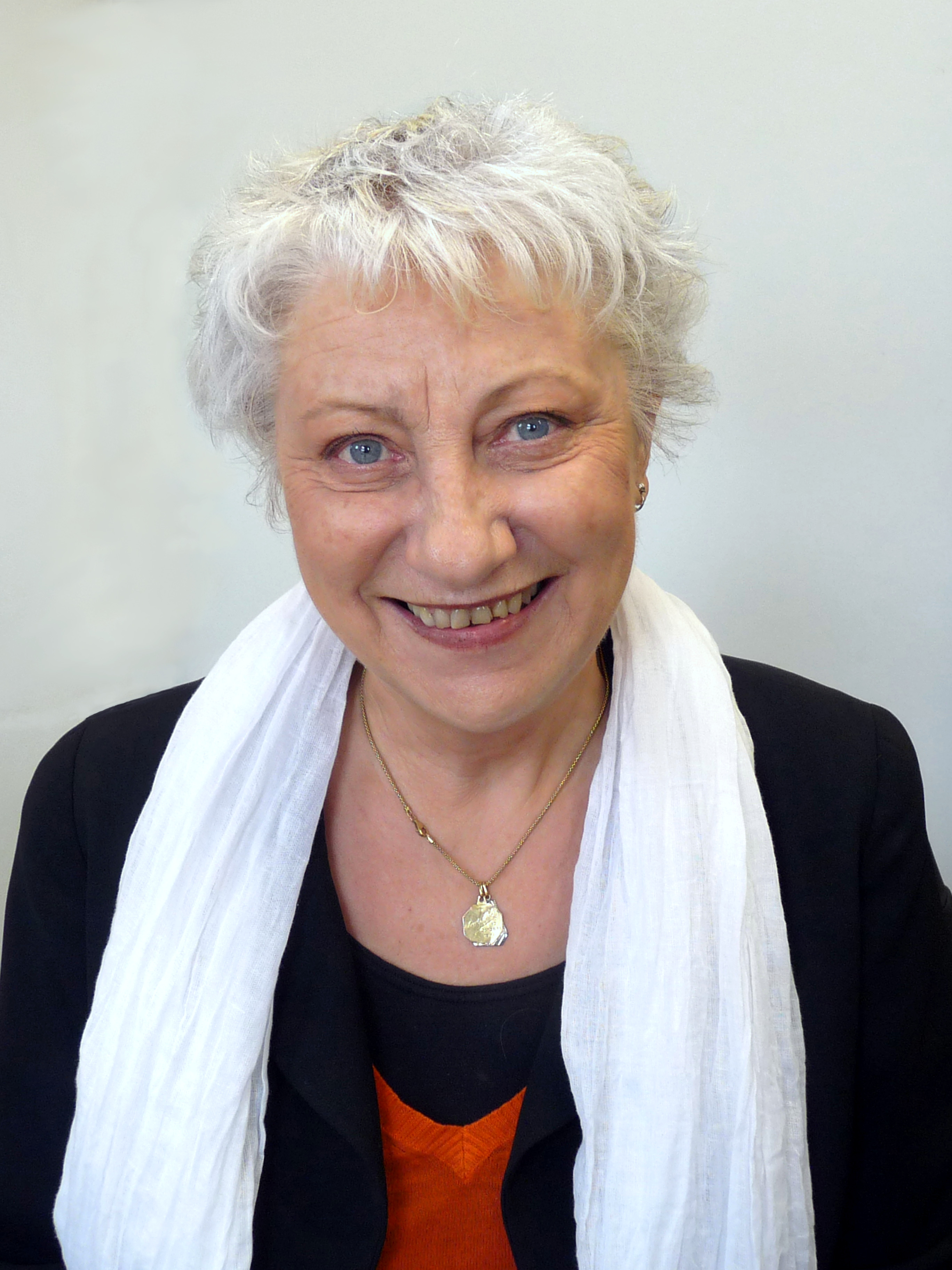
- Garat in 2011
- Born: 9 October 1946; Bordeaux, Gironde, France
- Died: 26 July 2022 (aged 75)
- Education: Université de Paris I
- Occupation: Novelist

Anne-Marie Garat (9 October 1946 – 26 July 2022) was a French novelist. She won the Prix Femina for her novel Aden in 1992 and the Prix Marguerite-Audoux for her novel Les mal famées.

Studying literature in Bordeaux, she then obtained a DEA in cinema at the université de Paris I. She lived in Paris, where she taught cinema and photography. Jack Lang then commissioned her to teach cinema at the école.

She published several novels, psychological in nature and with major female characters. They are set in various eras of the 20th century (e.g. the 1910s for Dans la main du diable, the Second World War for Les mal famées).

Following Dans la main du diable set before World War I in 1914, Anne-Marie Garat pursued in 2008, with L'enfant des ténèbres, her epic depiction of the 20th century, bringing up the period of 1930s and the rise of the totalitarian dictatorships.

== Works ==
- L'homme de Blaye, Flammarion, 1984
- Voie non classée, Flammarion, 1985
- L'insomniaque, Flammarion, 1987
- Le monarque égaré, Flammarion, 1989; Seuil, 1996
- Chambre noire, Flammarion, 1990 – Prix Alain-Fournier
- Aden, Seuil, 1992 – Prix Femina
- Photos de familles, Seuil, 1994
- Merle, Seuil, 1996
- Dans la pente du toit, Seuil, 1998
- L'amour de loin, Actes Sud, 1998
- Itsvan arrive par le train du soir, Seuil, 1999
- Les mal famées, Actes Sud, 2000; Babel N°557 – Prix Marguerite-Audoux
- Nous nous connaissons déjà, Actes Sud, 2003; Babel n°741
- La Rotonde, Actes Sud, 2004
- Une faim de loup. Lecture du Petit Chaperon rouge, Actes Sud, 2004
- Dans la main du diable, Actes Sud, 2006
- On ne peut pas continuer comme ça, Atelier In8, 2006
- Un tout petit coeur, actes sud junior, 2004
