= Michel Robida =

French journalist and writer (1909–1991)

Michel Robida (French pronunciation: [miʃɛl ʁɔbida]; 29 June 1909, Paris – 8 May 1991) was a French journalist and writer.

Michel Robida was laureate of the Prix Femina in 1946 as well as the Prix Narcisse Michaut of the Académie française en 1946 and the Prix Louis-Paul Miller of the same academy in 1956.

== Work ==
- 1945: Botemry
- 1946: Le Temps de la longue patience Éditions Julliard— Prix Femina
- 1948: Chateaubriand
- 1951: La Balle et le Lièvre
- 1953: Le Haut du pavé
- 1955: Ces bourgeois de Paris
- 1958: Sourires siciliens
- 1958: Le Salon Charpentier et les impressionnistes
- 1963: Retour à Coatélan
- 1968: Un monde englouti
- 1972: L'Enfant sage des années folles
