= Maria Le Hardouin =

Swiss writer (1912–1967)

Maria Le Hardouin (French pronunciation: [maʁja lə aʁdwɛ̃]; née, Sabine d'Outhoorn; 1912, Geneva – 24 May 1967, Paris) was a Swiss French-speaking writer and woman of letters. She was awarded the Prix Femina in 1949 for her novel La Dame de cœur.

== Works ==
- 1941: Dialogue à un seul personnage
- 1942: Journal de la jalousie
- 1943: La Voile noire
- 1944: Samson ou le Héros des temps futurs
- 1944: Celui qui n'était pas un héros
- 1947: L'Étoile absinthe
- 1948: Colette, une biographie
- 1949: La Dame de cœur, Prix Femina
- 1951: Les Amours parallèles
- 1956: Colette
- 1956: Recherche d'une éternité
- 1961: À la mémoire d'un homme
- 1962: Rimbaud le transfuge...
