= Marie-Louise Haumont =

Belgian writer (1919–2012)

Marie-Louise Haumont (French pronunciation: [maʁi lwiz omɔ̃]; 1919 – 7 February 2012) was a Belgian writer. She won the 1976 Prix Femina, for her novel, Le Trajet.

== Life ==
She was an editor for the paper Combat in Paris during World War II.

== Works ==
- Comme, ou la Journée de Madame Pline, Paris, NFR, Gallimard, 1974
- Le Trajet, Paris, NFR, Gallimard, 1976, Prix Femina
- L'Éponge, Paris, NFR, Gallimard, 1981
