= Jardin botanique de Sannois des Plantes Médicinales =

Botanical garden of medicinal plants in France

Coordinates: 48°58′20″N 2°15′28″E

The Jardin botanique de Sannois des Plantes Médicinales is a botanical garden of medicinal plants located at 23, rue Alphonse Duchesne, Sannois, Val-d'Oise, Île-de-France, France. The garden was begun in 1985 by a group calling itself Découverte et Connaissance de la Nature 95, founded 1978 by amateur naturalists, and was inaugurated in 1986. It contains an herb collection including angelica, marjoram, oregano, and so forth, and is open Saturday mornings without charge.

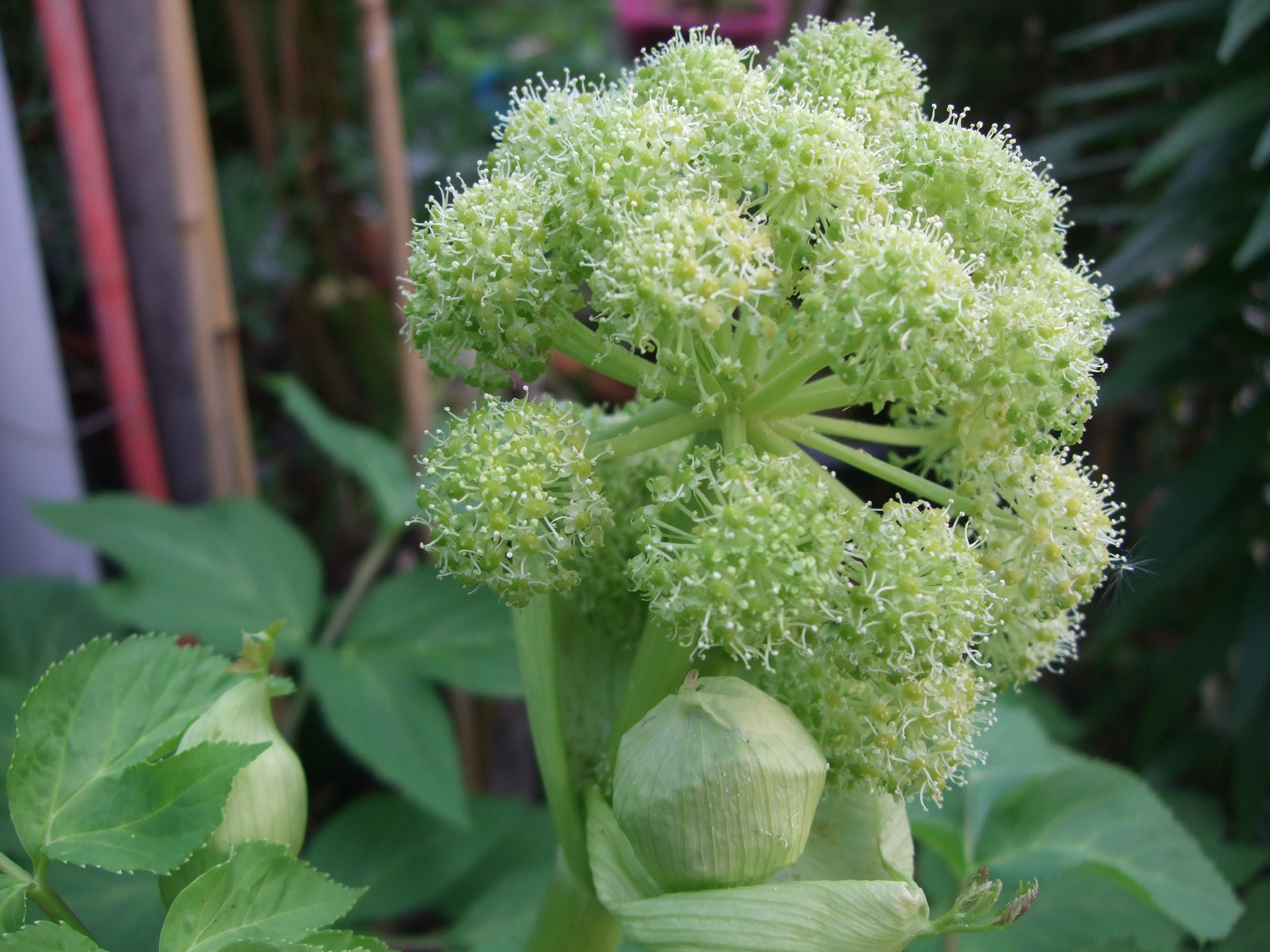
Jardin botanique de Sannois des Plantes Médicinales

== See also ==
- List of botanical gardens in France
