= Anne-Marie Monnet =

Anne-Marie Monnet (French pronunciation: [an maʁi mɔnɛ]) is a French writer, the winner of the 1945 edition of the prix Femina.

== Work ==
- 1945: Le Chemin du soleil, prix Femina, éditions du Myrte.
- 1947: Les Possédés de Hurtebise, short stories, éditions du Myrte.
- 1960: Katherine Mansfield followed by Journal d'Isabelle, éditions du Temps (series "Suite pour Isabelle")
