= Marc-Alain Ouaknin =

French rabbi and philosopher (born 1957)

- Born: 5 March 1957 (age 68); Paris, France
- Education: Paris Nanterre University
- Occupation(s): Philosopher; Rabbi

Marc-Alain Ouaknin (born 5 March 1957) is a French rabbi and a philosopher. He is the son of Rabbi Jacques Ouaknin (b. 1932, Marrakesh, Morocco) and Eliane Erlich Ouaknin (b. 1932, Lille; d. 2007, Marseille.) His father is the Grand Rabbi of the French cities of Reims, Lille, Metz, and Marseille. Ouaknin dedicated his best-known work, The Burnt Book, to "my father, my master, Grand Rabbi Jacques Ouaknin."

== Biography ==
Ouaknin earned a third-cycle doctoral degree in philosophy (1986) under the supervision of Pierre Kaufmann at the Paris Nanterre University.

He is the Director of the Centre De Recherches Et D’études Juives in Paris. He is also a professor of comparative literature at Bar-Ilan University in Israel. A major focus of his work since the 1980s has been to comment upon and extend the philosophy of Emmanuel Lévinas by comparing Levinas's writings to other Jewish texts—in particular to those of Hasidism and the Kabbalah. His work is in the continental philosophical tradition and emphasizes concepts current in French intellectual life. Unlike traditional rabbinic discourse, Ouaknin regularly cites thinkers outside the Jewish tradition, such as the psychoanalyst Jacques Lacan and the phenomenologist Maurice Merleau-Ponty.

== Literary works ==
Ouaknin's books and articles have been translated into more than twenty languages. His best-known book in the English-speaking world is The Burnt Book (Le livre brûlé).

== Partial bibliography ==
- Le livre brûlé, Lire le Talmud, Lieu Commun (1986); Seuil (1992)
- The Burnt Book: Reading the Talmud, translation by Llewellyn Brown of Le livre brûlé, Lire le Talmud, Princeton University Press (1995)
- I'll tell you a story, with Dory Rotnemer, translation by Sarah Matthews of A toi je donne mes histoires, London : Moonlight (1995)
- Symbols of Judaism, translation by Mimi Tompkins of Symboles du judaïsme, Paris : Editions Assouline (1997)
- Mysteries of the kabbalah, translation by Josephine Bacon of Mystères de la kabbale, New York : Abbeville Press (2000)
- Haggadah : the Passover story, [commentary by]] Marc-Alain Ouaknin, translated from the French by Jeffrey Green, New York : Assouline (2001)
- La bible de l'humour juif, with D. Rotnemer, Ramsay (1995); J'ai lu (2002)
- Jean Daviot, Le ciel au bout des doigts, Paris Musées /Actes Sud, (2004)
- Bar mitzvah : a guide to spiritual growth, translation by Nicholas Elliott, New York : Assouline (2005)
- Mehitza : seen by women, Jerusalem : Gefen Publishing House (2016)
