= Alain Absire =

French writer (born 1950)

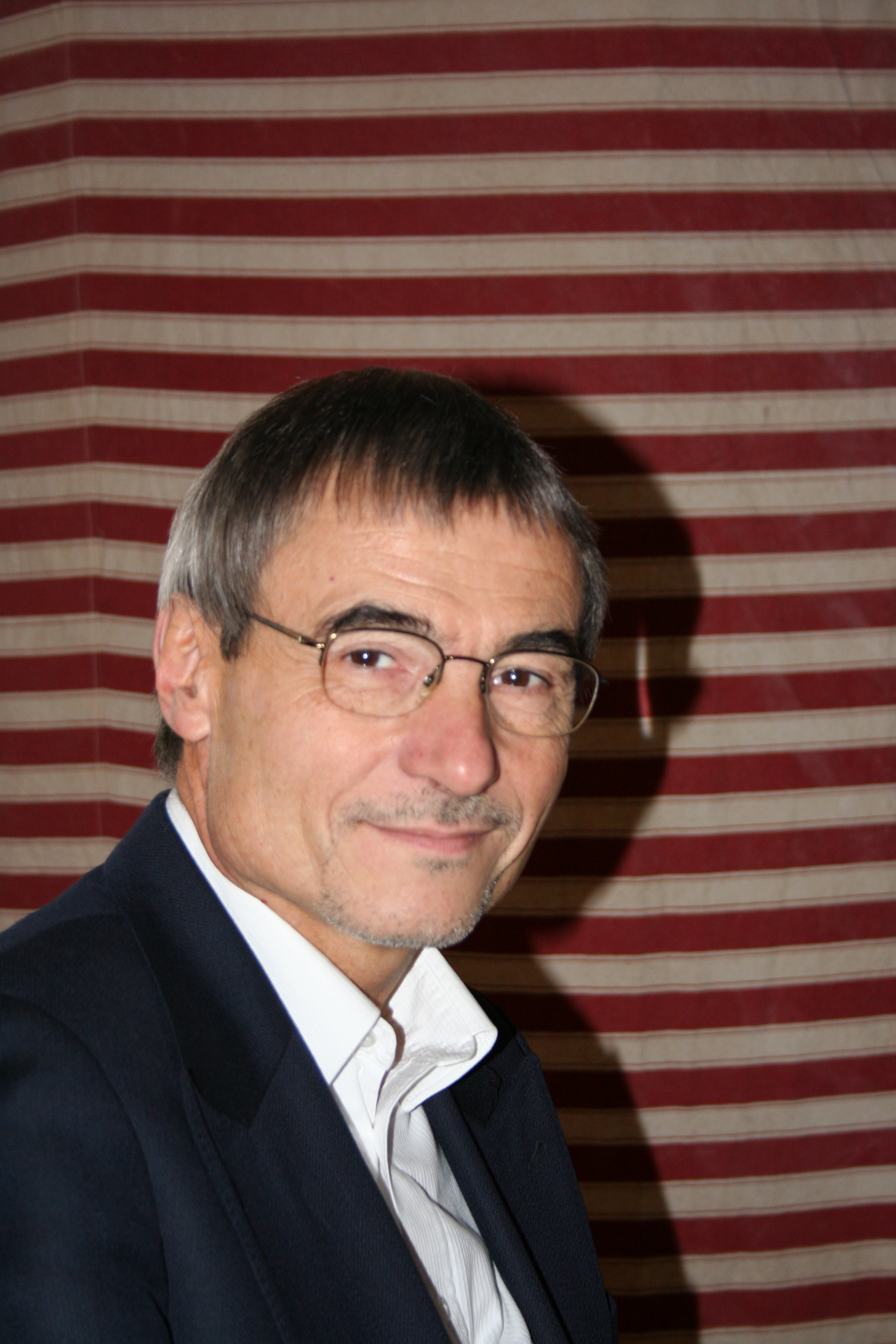
- Absire in 2008
- Born: 1950 (age 75–76); Rouen, France
- Writing career
- Language: French
- Notable work: L'Égal de Dieu
- Notable awards: Prix Femina

Alain Absire (French pronunciation: [alɛ̃ apsiʁ]; born 1950) is a French writer, and winner of the Prix Femina, 1987, for L'Égal de Dieu.

== Works ==
He is the author of about 20 books published by Albin Michel, Calmann-Lévy, Julliard, Zulma, Flammarion etc., his publications include:

Novels

- 1979: L'Homme disparu, Albin Michel
- 1983: Vasile Evanescu, l'homme à tête d'oiseau, Calmann-Lévy (Prix Libre 1984)
- 1984: 118, rue Terminale, Calmann-Lévy
- 1985: Lazare ou le grand sommeil, Calmann-Lévy
- 1987: L'Égal de Dieu, Calmann-Lévy, Prix Femina
- 1990: Baptiste ou la dernière saison, Calmann-Lévy
- 1995: L'Enfant-lune, Julliard
- 1997: Alessandro ou la guerre des chiens, Flammarion
- 1999: Les Noces fatales, Flammarion
- 2000: Le Pauvre d'Orient, Presses de la Renaissance
- 2002: Lapidation, Fayard
- 2003: La Déclaration d'amour, Fayard
- 2004: Jean S., Fayard
- 2007: Sans pays, Fayard
- 2014: Mon sommeil sera paisible, Gallimard

Short stories

- 1985: L'Éveil, Le Castor astral
- 1989: Mémoires du bout du monde, Presses de la Renaissance
- 1991: Les Tyrans, Presses de la Renaissance
- 2006: Au voyageur qui ne fait que passer, Fayard
- 2008: Saga italienne, NiL Éditions

Essays

- 2004: Alejo Carpentier, Julliard

Collections

- 2004: Lettres à Dieu, collectif, Calmann-Lévy
