= Jean Daviot =

French contemporary artist

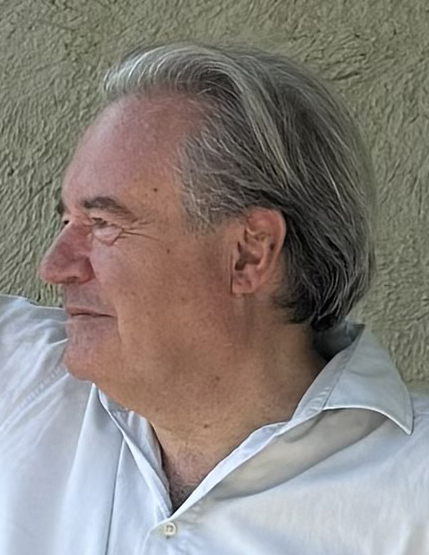
Image of Jean Daviot

Jean Daviot (born February 20, 1962) is a French contemporary artist born in Digne. He went to the art school at the Villa Arson in Nice and lives and works in Paris.

== Work ==
Jean Daviot distinguishes himself by the exploitation of various ways of intervention: video, photography, painting, but also actions in the landscape or sonorous works. In 1984, he created a fictional character: the artist Walter Pinkrops. From 1994, he realised "Ombrographies" by taking imprints of faces and hands in photocopy and transferring these traces onto white canvas. Since 1999, he has drawn the outline of people coming to his workshop: "The visitors of the self". In these paintings, the body and its shadow join in the same shape: "The shape of the body is the body of the shape". In "Silences", he questions the language of the hands: a universal language of symbols. In "Srevne", presented at "La force de l'art" in 2006 in the Grand Palais in Paris, he made his voice heard at the place, inside out and upside down backwards. He sculpts the language as an object, which then becomes an off-voice reflection of the palimpsest. "L'écart des mots" are photographs where he inserts words in landscapes, skies, cities, playing on their signifieds and signifiers. With "Vherbe" he really makes words grow in the landscape, words in letters of grass which can measure several hundred meters: "MEmoiRE" near the prehistoric cave of Pech Merle, "ImaGinE" at the Genshagen Foundation in Berlin, or "Lieu et lien" in front of the Palais du Pharo in Marseille.

Since 1995, Jean Daviot gas created digital paintings, "Ecritures de lumières", where he uses a video camera as a brush. The procedure is simple, in appearance: the camera slows down, he heads it towards planets emitting or reflecting light, the Sun, Venus, Jupiter, the Toon, or towards cities at night and lets, by the movement of his hand, the light deposit itself on the support. It is the very light which deposits itself in bursts of colour, streams of oscillations and of flow on the screen, the canvas, the wall. A work that Marc-Alain Ouaknin calls "The sky at his fingertips", the title of a book he wrote on the artist. In his "Bocca del mondo", Daviot makes huge jars speak and discuss; by night they transform into planets. In a work in 2013, "en visage le paysage", points of view on places appear through the contour of his face made of stone or metal. In 2016, Daviot continued his "Wordscapes" around the language and writes words in landscapes in a new form of Land art.

== Recent exhibitions (selection) ==
2006

- La Force de l'art, Grand Palais, Paris
- Distorsions, Institut d'art contemporain, Villeurbanne
- L'Homme-Paysage, Palais des beaux-arts de Lille

2007

- Transformationen, Entgrenzungen, Körperräume Villa Oppenheim, Berlin
- L'Homme-Paysage, Château d'Oiron
- MEmoiRE, Nuit Blanche, Church of Saint-Sulpice, Paris, Paris
- Propos d'Europe 0.6, Hippocrène Foundation, Agence Mallet-Stevens, Paris
- Écriture de lumières, Vidéo K.01, Centre d'art contemporain Le Parvis, Pau
- Bocca del mondo, La loggia Montefiridolfi, Florence, Italy

2008

- Journées mondiale de la philosophie, UNESCO, Insistance, Paris
- Paris/Budapest, château de Fehérvárcsurgó, Hungary
- Boomerang, Maison des arts Georges Pompidou, Cajarc / Maison Daura, Saint-Cirq-Lapopie / Centre de Préhistoire de Pech Merle
- ...Einen augen-blick, bitte Kunstverein-Bad-Salzdetfurth e.V., Bodenburg, Germany
- Mujeres Museo Shcp-Hacienda, Mexico

2009

- Materialität der Sprache, KunstbüroBerlin, Berlin
- Dreamtime, les Abattoirs, Musée d'art moderne et contemporain, Toulouse
- Ecriture de lune dans la grotte du Mas-d'Azil, Ariège
- ImaGinE, Domaine de Saint-Jean de Beauregard, Essonne

2010

- Fondation Genshagen, Berlin
- Vie si on, Centre d'art contemporain, Saint-Restitut

2011

- Lieu/Lien, Palais du Pharo, Marseille
- Bocca del mondo, festival a part, Château royal, Tarascon

2012

- The Hidden Mother, atelier Rouart/Berthe Morisot, Paris
- La plasticité du langage, Hippocrène Foundation, Agence Mallet-Stevens, Paris
- Ecriture de lumières, Mathieu Muséum, Gargas
- Mot d'elle/ Modèle, Parc de Maison-Blanche, Marseille

2013

- Avenir, Genshagen Foundation, Berlin
- Galaxie de Lalangue, Ile de Porquerolles
- L'art au défi de l'espérance, Mairie de Paris

2014

- Lux, Le Fresnoy, Studio national des arts contemporains, Tourcoing
- l'île envisagée, Pierre Salinger Foundation, Le Thor

2017

- Svet lo, Kutscherfeld Palace, French Institute of Slovakia, Bratislava

== Monographs ==
- Evelyne Toussaint, Jean Daviot, Nowmuseum, 2016
- Marc-Alain Ouaknin, Le ciel au bout des doigts, Paris Musées /Actes Sud, 2004
- Philippe Lançon, Jean Daviot, Victoire Éditions, Paris, 1998
- Nathalie Ergino, Hall, Paris, 1996
