= Louis de Robert =

French writer (1871–1937)

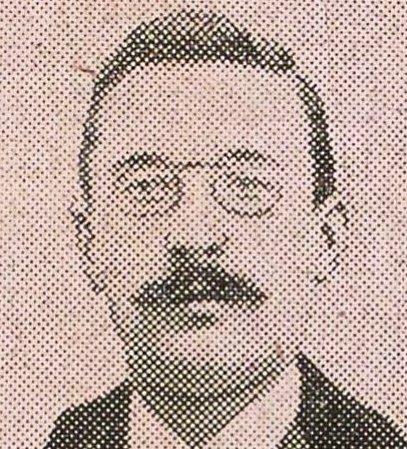
- Louis de Robert in 1911
- Born: 5 March 1871; Paris, France
- Died: 27 September 1937 (aged 66); Sannois, France
- Occupation: Writer
- Spouse: Jeanne Humbert

Louis de Robert (French pronunciation: [lwi də ʁɔbɛʁ]; 5 March 1871, Paris – 27 September 1937) was a French writer; he won the Prix Femina in 1911.

== Biography ==
Robert became friends with the writer Émile Zola during the political scandal Dreyfus affair and took a stand for the revision of the trial.

A regular collaborator in The Journal, with Jules Renard, Alphonse Allais, Octave Mirbeau, he was the first reader of the proofs of the 1913 novel Swann's Way by his friend Marcel Proust and dissuaded Proust from shortening it.

Robert's novel Le Roman du malade, serialized in Le Figaro newspaper and then published by the Éditions Fasquelle, won the 1911 Prix Femina. The novel was admired by the writers Maurice Barres, Anna de Noailles, Robert de Montesquiou and Colette.

He won the prize of the Académie Française.

== Personal life ==
Having fallen in love with Jeanne Humbert, thirty years younger, they married at the town hall of Sannois on 8 November 1928. She survived him for more than half a century and published her autobiography, Le cœur a ses raisons, in 1986, on vanity press.

== Works ==
- 1894: Un tendre
- 1896: Papa
- 1896: Fragiles.
- 1897: The Eternal Enigma Yvette Guilbert, New York City
- 1898: La Première Femme
- 1900: La Reprise
- 1901: Le Mauvais Amant
- 1901: Le Partage du cœur
- 1911: Le Roman du malade (winner, Prix Femina)
- 1912: L'envers d'une courtisane
- 1918: Le Prince amoureux
- 1921: Réussir
- 1921: Reconnais-toi
- 1922: Silvestre et Monique
- 1924: Paroles d'un solitaire
- 1925: Octavie
- 1925: Comment débuta Marcel Proust, lettres inédites
- 1925: Le Préféré
- 1926: Le Roman d'une comédienne
- 1927: Le Supplice des bourgeois de Premz
- 1927: Ni avec toi, ni sans toi
- 1928: Souvenirs sur Edmond Rostand
- 1930: De l'amour à la sagesse, suivi de Réflexions sur Marcel Proust
- 1931: La Rose et le cyprès
- 1932: Journal d’un mari
- 1933: Tragédie du désir
- 1936: Trop belle

=== Posthumous ===
- Lettres à Paul Faure, 1898–1937, 1943
