= Félix de Chazournes =

French writer (1887–1940)

Félix de Chazournes (French pronunciation: [feliks də ʃazuʁn]; 26 December 1887 – December 1940) was a French writer, the winner of the 1938 Prix Femina.

== Biography ==
Born in Lyon, de Chazournes was the eldest of twelve children of the couple Félix Marie Henri Boisson of Chazournes and Jeanne Troubat married in 1887 in Lyon.

de Chazournes first worked in a business house in England. While he was sent to Morocco, the First World War began and he was mobilized on site in the spahis. Sent to the front, he was incorporated among the chasseurs alpins (alpine hunters).

In 1918, he resumed his import-export work and moved to China, South America and the West Indies. In the 1930s, he wrote novels which were published by éditions Gallimard and obtained the Prix Femina in 1938 for Caroline ou le Départ pour les îles.

== Works ==
- 1908: Les Boucles, édition Alphonse Lemerre.
- 1935: Jason: Portrait des Tropiques (short story), Gallimard, ISBN 2070214028.
- 1938: Caroline ou le Départ pour les îles, Gallimard, ISBN 2070214036, (Prix Femina)
- 1939: Arianwen, short story in the Revue des deux Mondes
- 1940: Agnès ou le Rivage de Bohème, Gallimard, ISBN 2070214044.
- 1946: Ophélia ou l'Anglaise de la colline (posthumous).
