= Prix Femina =

French literary prize decided by female jury

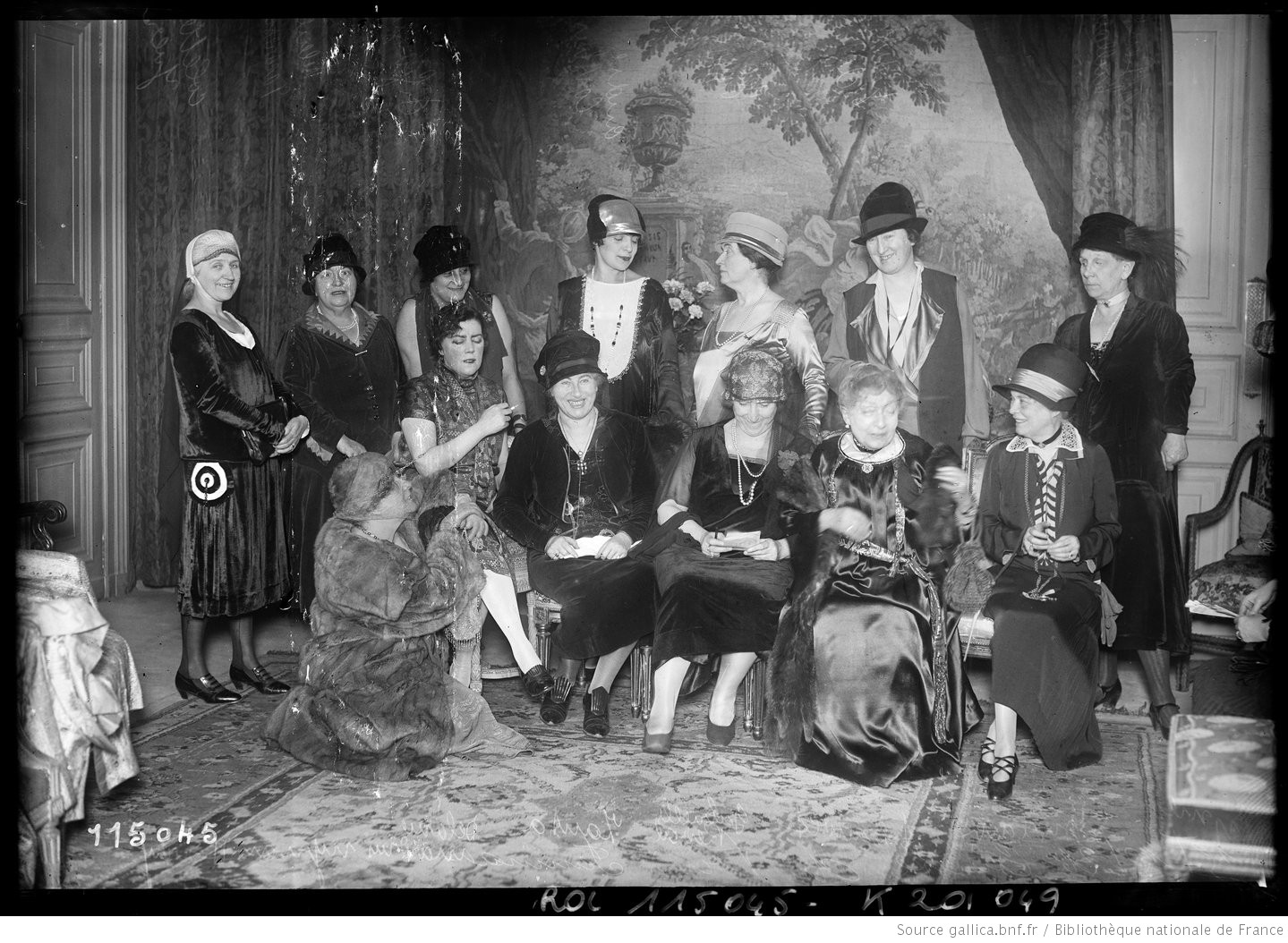
The Prix Femina committee in 1926

The Prix Femina (Note: The Prix Femina is sometimes spelt Prix Fémina, but it is officially spelt without an accent, even in French.) is a French literary prize awarded each year by an exclusively female jury. The prize, which was established in 1904, is awarded to French-language works written in prose or verse by male or female writers, and is announced on the first Wednesday of November each year. Four categories of prizes are awarded: Prix Femina, Prix Femina essai, Prix Femina étranger (foreign novels), and Prix Femina des lycéens. A Prix Femina spécial is occasionally awarded.

== History ==
The Prix Femina was created in 1904 by 22 writers for the magazine La Vie heureuse, which later merged into the magazine Femina, which ceased publication in 1954.

After the Great War, in 1919 Librairie Hachette proposed to the allied countries to create a similar prize. Great Britain accepted, and the first meeting of its jury was held on 20 June 1920. The prize was called the Prix Femina–Vie Heureuse, and it was awarded to English writers, from 1920 to 1939. Among the winners were E. M. Forster in 1925 and Virginia Woolf in 1928.

Similarly, in 1920 Lady Northcliffe, wife of Alfred Harmsworth, proposed to create a prize for French writers called the Northcliffe prize. Among the winners were Joseph Kessel in 1924, Julien Green in 1928, and Jean Giono in 1931. The last meeting of the jury for this prize was held on 10 April 1940, before the Nazis occupied France during World War II.

The archives of the English Committee are held by Cambridge University Library.

== Jury ==
As of June 2021, the jury of the Femina consisted of eleven female members:

- Josyane Savigneau (president)
- Evelyne Bloch-Dano
- Claire Gallois
- Anne-Marie Garat
- Paula Jacques
- Christine Jordis
- Mona Ozouf
- Danièle Sallenave
- Nathalie Azoulai
- Scholastique Mukasonga
- Patricia Reznikov

== List of winners ==
There are currently four categories: Prix Femina, Prix Femina essai, Prix Femina étranger (foreign novels), and Prix Femina des lycéens.

=== Prix Femina ===
| Year | Title | Author | Notes |
|---|---|---|---|
| 1904 | La Conquête de Jérusalem | Myriam Harry | |
| 1905 | Jean-Christophe | Romain Rolland | |
| 1906 | Gemmes et moires | André Corthis | |
| 1907 | Princesses de science | Colette Yver | |
| 1908 | La Vie secrète | Édouard Estaunié | |
| 1909 | Le reste est silence | Edmond Jaloux | |
| 1910 | Marie-Claire | Marguerite Audoux | |
| 1911 | Le Roman du malade | Louis de Robert | |
| 1912 | Feuilles mortes | Jacques Morel | |
| 1913 | La Statue voilée | Camille Marbo | |
| 1914 | no winner | —N/a | |
| 1915 | no winner | —N/a | |
| 1916 | no winner | —N/a | |
| 1917 | L'Odyssée d'un transport torpillé | René Milan | |
| 1918 | Le Serviteur | Henri Bachelin | |
| 1919 | Les Croix de bois | Roland Dorgelès | |
| 1920 | Le Jardin des Dieux | Edmond Gojon | |
| 1921 | Cantegril | Raymond Escholier | |
| 1922 | Silbermann | Jacques de Lacretelle | |
| 1923 | Les Allongés | Jeanne Galzy | |
| 1924 | Le Bestiaire sentimental | Charles Derennes | |
| 1925 | Jeanne d'Arc | Joseph Delteil | |
| 1926 | Prodige du cœur | Charles Silvestre | |
| 1927 | Grand-Louis l'innocent | Marie Le Franc | |
| 1928 | Georgette Garou | Dominique Dunois | |
| 1929 | La Joie | Georges Bernanos | |
| 1930 | Cécile de la Folie | Marc Chadourne | |
| 1931 | Vol de nuit | Antoine de Saint-Exupéry | |
| 1932 | Le Pari | Ramon Fernandez | |
| 1933 | Claude | Geneviève Fauconnier | |
| 1934 | Le Bateau-refuge | Robert Francis | |
| 1935 | Bénédiction | Claude Silve | |
| 1936 | Sangs | Louise Hervieu | |
| 1937 | Campagne | Raymonde Vincent | |
| 1938 | Caroline ou le Départ pour les îles | Félix de Chazournes | |
| 1939 | La Rose de la mer | Paul Vialar | |
| 1940 | no winner | —N/a | |
| 1941 | no winner | —N/a | |
| 1942 | no winner | —N/a | |
| 1943 | no winner | —N/a | |
| 1944 | (Special award for its French Resistance work) | Éditions de Minuit (publisher) | |
| 1945 | Le Chemin du soleil | Anne-Marie Monnet | |
| 1946 | Le Temps de la longue patience | Michel Robida | |
| 1947 | Bonheur d'occasion | Gabrielle Roy | |
| 1948 | Les Hauteurs de la ville | Emmanuel Roblès | |
| 1949 | La Dame de cœur | Maria Le Hardouin | |
| 1950 | La Femme sans passé | Serge Groussard | |
| 1951 | Jabadao | Anne de Tourville | |
| 1952 | Le Souffle | Dominique Rolin | |
| 1953 | La Pierre angulaire | Zoé Oldenbourg | |
| 1954 | La Machine humaine | Gabriel Veraldi | |
| 1955 | Le pays où l'on arrive jamais | André Dhôtel | |
| 1956 | Les Adieux | François-Régis Bastide | |
| 1957 | Le Carrefour des solitudes | Christian Mégret | |
| 1958 | L'Empire céleste (Café Céleste) | Françoise Mallet-Joris | |
| 1959 | Au pied du mur | Bernard Privat | |
| 1960 | La Porte retombée | Louise Bellocq | |
| 1961 | Le Promontoire (The Promontory) | Henri Thomas | |
| 1962 | Le Sud | Yves Berger | |
| 1963 | La Nuit de Mougins | Roger Vrigny | |
| 1964 | Le Faussaire | Jean Blanzat | |
| 1965 | Quelqu'un (Someone) | Robert Pinget | |
| 1966 | Nature morte devant la fenêtre | Irène Monesi | |
| 1967 | Élise ou la Vraie Vie | Claire Etcherelli | |
| 1968 | L'Oeuvre au noir (The Abyss) | Marguerite Yourcenar | |
| 1969 | La Deuxième Mort de Ramón Mercader | Jorge Semprún | |
| 1970 | La Crève | François Nourissier | |
| 1971 | La Maison des Atlantes | Angelo Rinaldi | |
| 1972 | Ciné-roman | Roger Grenier | |
| 1973 | Juan Maldonne | Michel Dard | |
| 1974 | L'Imprécateur | René-Victor Pilhes | |
| 1975 | Le Maître d'heure | Claude Faraggi | |
| 1976 | Le Trajet | Marie-Louise Haumont | |
| 1977 | La neige brûle | Régis Debray | |
| 1978 | Un amour de père | François Sonkin | |
| 1979 | Le Guetteur d'ombre | Pierre Moinot | |
| 1980 | Joue-nous España | Jocelyne François | |
| 1981 | Le Grand Vizir de la nuit | Catherine Hermary-Vieille | |
| 1982 | Les Fous de Bassan (In the Shadow of the Wind) | Anne Hébert | |
| 1983 | Riche et légère | Florence Delay | |
| 1984 | Tous les soleils | Bertrand Visage | |
| 1985 | Sans la miséricorde du Christ | Hector Bianciotti | |
| 1986 | L'Enfer | René Belletto | |
| 1987 | L'Égal à Dieu (God's Equal) | Alain Absire | |
| 1988 | Le Zèbre (The Zebra) | Alexandre Jardin | |
| 1989 | Jours de colère | Sylvie Germain | |
| 1990 | Nous sommes éternels | Pierrette Fleutiaux | |
| 1991 | Déborah et les anges dissipés | Paula Jacques | |
| 1992 | Aden | Anne-Marie Garat | |
| 1993 | L'Oeil du silence | Marc Lambron | |
| 1994 | Port-Soudan | Olivier Rolin | |
| 1995 | La Classe de neige (Class Trip) | Emmanuel Carrère | |
| 1996 | Week-end de chasse à la mère | Geneviève Brisac | |
| 1997 | Amour noir | Dominique Noguez | |
| 1998 | Le Dit de Tianyi (The River Below) | François Cheng | |
| 1999 | Anchise | Maryline Desbiolles | |
| 2000 | Dans ces bras-là (In His Arms) | Camille Laurens | |
| 2001 | Rosie Carpe | Marie Ndiaye | |
| 2002 | Les adieux à la reine (Farewell, My Queen) | Chantal Thomas | |
| 2003 | Le complexe de Di (Mr. Muo's Travelling Couch) | Dai Sijie | |
| 2004 | Une vie française (Vie Francaise) | Jean-Paul Dubois | |
| 2005 | Asile de fous | Régis Jauffret | |
| 2006 | Lignes de faille (Fault Lines) | Nancy Huston | |
| 2007 | Baisers de cinéma | Eric Fottorino | |
| 2008 | Où on va, papa? | Jean-Louis Fournier | |
| 2009 | Personne | Gwenaëlle Aubry | |
| 2010 | La vie est brève et le désir sans fin | Patrick Lapeyre | |
| 2011 | Jayne Mansfield 1967 | Simon Liberati | |
| 2012 | Peste & Choléra | Patrick Deville | |
| 2013 | La Saison de l’ombre | Léonora Miano | |
| 2014 | Bain de lune | Yanick Lahens | |
| 2015 | La Cache | Christophe Boltanski | |
| 2016 | Le Garçon | Marcus Malte | |
| 2017 | La Serpe | Philippe Jaenada | |
| 2018 | Le Lambeau (Disturbance: Surviving Charlie Hebdo) | Philippe Lançon | |
| 2019 | Par les routes | Sylvain Prudhomme | |
| 2020 | Nature humaine | Serge Joncour | |
| 2021 | S'adapter | Clara Dupont-Monod | |
| 2022 | Un chien à ma table | Claudie Hunzinger | |
| 2023 | Triste Tigre (Sad Tiger) | Neige Sinno | |
| 2024 | Le rêve du jaguar | Miguel Bonnefoy | |
| 2025 | La Nuit au cœur | Nathacha Appanah | |

=== Prix Femina étranger ===
The Prix Femina étranger is awarded annually to a foreign-language literary work translated into French.

=== Prix Femina essai ===
The Prix Femina essai, established in 1999, is awarded to an essay. It replaced the Prix Hélène Vacaresco.

=== Prix Femina spécial ===
The has been awarded to several writers, for the entirety of their work.

In 2017, anthropologist and essayist Françoise Héritier was awarded a Prix Femina spécial.

Pierre Guyotat was awarded the prize in 2018.

In 2019, the Prix Femina spécial was awarded to Irish novelist Edna O'Brien, following the publication of her last novel, Girl, which had been shortlisted for the Prix Femina étranger. The prize was awarded in honour of her whole body of work, and it was the first time a non-French author had won it.

=== Prix Femina des lycéens ===
| Year | Title | Author |
|---|---|---|
| 2016 | Tropique de la violence | Nathacha Appanah |
| 2017 | Ma reine | Jean-Baptiste Andrea |
| 2018 | Je voudrais que la nuit me prenne | Isabelle Desesquelles |
| 2019 | La Chaleur | Victor Jestin |
| 2020 | Ce qu'il faut de nuit | Laurent Petitmangin |
| 2021 | Le rire des déesses | Ananda Devi |
| 2022 | Tenir sa langue | Polina Panassenko |
| 2023 | Ce que je sais de toi | Éric Chacour |
| 2024 | Ilaria ou la conquête de la désobéissance | Gabriella Zalapi |
| 2025 | Le monde est fatigué | Joseph Incardona |

=== Femina–Vie Heureuse ===
The following awards were made during the lifetime of the award.

| Year | Title | Author |
|---|---|---|
| 1920 | William - an Englishman | Cicely Hamilton |
| 1921 | The Splendid Fairing | Constance Holme |
| 1922 | Dangerous Ages | Rose Macaulay |
| 1923 | Gruach | Gordon Bottomley |
| 1924 | Roman Pictures | Percy Lubbock |
| 1925 | A Passage to India | E. M. Forster |
| 1926 | Precious Bane | Mary Webb |
| 1927 | Adam's Breed | Radclyffe Hall |
| 1928 | To the Lighthouse | Virginia Woolf |
| 1929 | Gallion's Reach | H. M. Tomlinson |
| 1930 | Portrait in a Mirror | Charles Morgan |
| 1931 | A High Wind in Jamaica | Richard Hughes |
| 1932 | Tobit Transplanted | Stella Benson |
| 1933 | Small Town | Bradda Field |
| 1934 | Cold Comfort Farm | Stella Gibbons |
| 1935 | Harriet | Elizabeth Jenkins |
| 1936 | The Root and the Flower | L. H. Myers |
| 1937 | Faith, Hope, no Charity | Margaret Lane |
| 1938 | The Porch | Richard Church |
| 1939 | Count Belisarius | Robert Graves |

== See also ==
- List of literary awards
