= H. M. Tomlinson =

British writer and journalist (1873–1958)

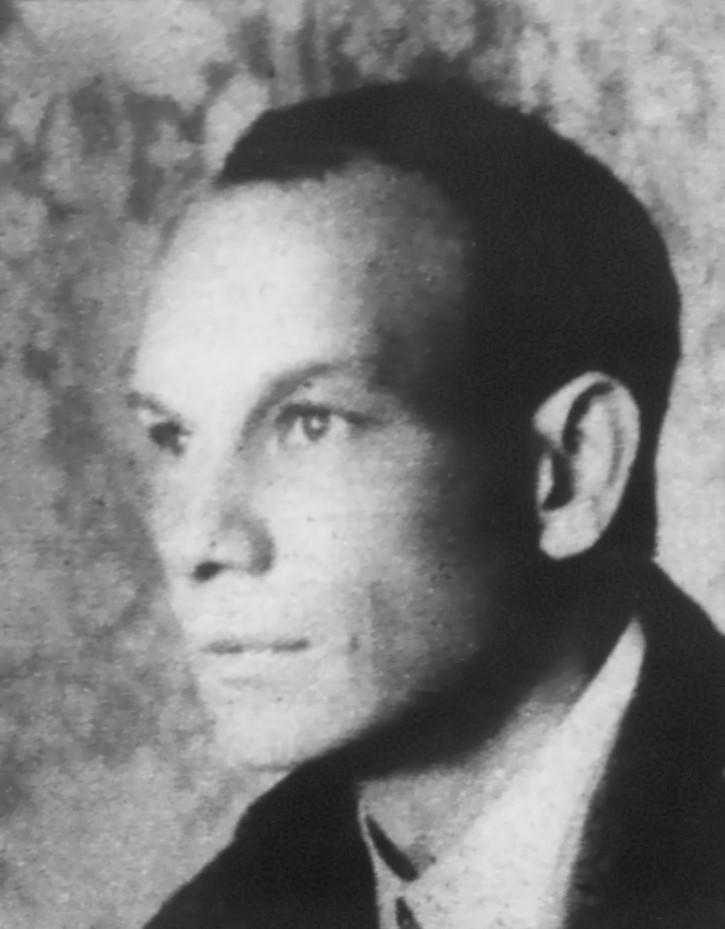
- Henry Major Tomlinson, circa 1927
- Born: 21 June 1873; Poplar, London, United Kingdom
- Died: 5 February 1958 (aged 84); Poplar, London, United Kingdom
- Occupations: Journalist, novelist
- Spouse: Florence Margaret Hammond (1899)
- Children: 3
- Writing career
- Notable works: The Sea and the Jungle (1912); Gallions Reach (1927); All Our Yesterdays (1930); The Turn of the Tide (1945)
- Notable awards: Femina Vie Heureuse prize (1929)

Henry Major Tomlinson (21 June 1873 – 5 February 1958) was a British writer, novelist, journalist, and essayist. He was known for his travel literature, maritime essays, novels and anti-war works, and was widely admired during the interwar period for the quality of his prose style. His 1912 work The Sea and the Jungle became regarded as a classic of English travel literature, and his debut novel Gallions Reach (1927) won the Femina Vie Heureuze Prize in 1929.

Tomlinson moved within the literary circles associated with Edward Garnett and The English Review, alongside figures such as Joseph Conrad, John Galsworthy, W. H. Hudson and Ford Madox Ford. The American journalist, novelist and poet Christopher Morley once described him as the "Lord God of English prose", and his prose style has been favourably compared with Henry David Thoreau and Ralph Waldo Emerson.

== Life and work ==
Tomlinson was born and raised in Poplar, London, to Henry Tomlinson, a foreman at the West India Docks, and Emily Major. Educated at a local school, Henry began working as a shipping clerk at the docks at the age of twelve. In 1886, his father died, and Henry became responsible for providing for the family. In the evenings Tomlinson continued his education by studying geology, botany, mineralogy and zoology. After a quarrel with his employer at the docks led him to walk out of his job, Tomlinson "presented himself on the spur of the moment to the editor of the Morning Leader, a Radical paper that later became the Daily News, and was given a job", becoming a full-time employed reporter in 1904. In their employ he was sent on several international trips, including an expedition (beginning in Cardiff, Wales) in 1909–10, some 2,000 miles up the Amazon River in South America, and his journey became the basis for one of his most celebrated books, The Sea and the Jungle (1912).

In World War I, he was an official correspondent for the British Army, in France. He became disillusioned with the conduct of the war, and in 1917 he returned to work with H. W. Massingham as the Literary Editor of The Nation magazine, which opposed the war. Christopher Morley wrote in 1957 that Tomlinson "never really recovered from the first World War, which he witnessed as a war correspondent. The death and destruction which he saw at first hand corroded his spirit, though he never lost his faith in the "nobodies," the common men who had won that war." He left the paper in April 1923 with Massingham when Joseph Rowntree decided to sell the journal to a group headed by John Maynard Keynes. In 1930 he published an autobiographical account of his war experiences in his book All Our Yesterdays.

Tomlinson continued to write novels and travel stories until the end of his life. His final novel, The Trumpet Shall Sound (1957), is set during the Second World War, in particular during The Blitz, and follows the stories of the Gale family in London. In a review of the book, The New York Times concluded that "[as] a marksman, Mr. Tomlinson is master of many kinds of arrows." The New Yorker's reviewer wrote: "It is fascinating, human, and beautifully told in full but not sad consciousness of all that goes on in human hearts—the fear and pain and love and confusion and joy—whether the hours are spent with books and roses or out in the dark within sound of gunfire." Tomlinson died on 5 February 1958 at the age of 84.

== Personal life ==
On 26 December 1899, at St. Stephen's Church, Poplar, he married Florence Margaret Hammond, daughter of Thomas Hammond, a sailmaker, of Pekin Street, Poplar, by whom he had a son and two daughters.

== Bibliography ==
A large collection of Tomlinson’s manuscripts, correspondence, and other papers is held at the Harry Ransom Center at the University of Texas at Austin. Further manuscripts and correspondence, including drafts of All Our Yesterdays and Gallion’s Reach, are preserved in the H. M. Tomlinson collection at the Beinecke Rare Book and Manuscript Library, Yale University.

=== Travel writing and essays ===
- The Sea and the Jungle (1912)
- Old Junk (1918)
- London River (1921; revised edition 1951)
- Waiting for Daylight (1922)
- Tidemarks: Some Records of a Journey to the Beaches of the Moluccas and the Forest of Malaya in 1923 (1924)
- Gifts of Fortune With Some Hints For Those About to Travel (1926)
- Under the Red Ensign (1926)
- Out of Soundings (1928)
- Côte d'Or (1929)
- South to Cadiz (1934)
- Below London Bridge (1934)
- The Wind is Rising: The War Diary of H. M. Tomlinson and a Vision of All Our Tomorrows (1941)
- Morning Light: The Islanders in the Days of Oak and Hemp (1946)
- Malay Waters (1950)
- The Face of the Earth (1950)
- The Haunted Forest (1951)
- A Mingled Yarn: Autobiographical Sketches (1953)

=== Fiction ===
- Gallions Reach (1927)
- A Brown Owl (1928)
- Illusion: 1915 (1928)
- Between the Lines (1930)
- All Our Yesterdays (1930)
- The Sky's the Limit (1930)
- The Snows of Helicon (1933)
- Mars His Idiot (1935)
- Pipe All Hands (1937)
- The Day Before: A Romantic Chronicle (1939)
- The Turn of the Tide (1945)
- The Trumpet Shall Sound (1957)

=== Biography and criticism ===
- Thomas Hardy (1929)
- Norman Douglas (1931)

=== Edited volumes ===
- Great Sea Stories of All Nations (1930), editor
- Best Short Stories of the War (1931), editor
- Modern Travel (1939), editor

=== Other works ===
- War Books: A Lecture Given at Manchester University, 15 February 1929 (1930)
- An Illustrated Catalogue of Rare Books on the East Indies and A Letter to a Friend (1932)
- RMS Queen Mary: A Noble Tribute to the Imagination of Man (1935; with E. P. Leigh-Bennett)
- "Ports of Call", in The Queen's Book of the Red Cross (1939)

== Reception and style ==
Tomlinson was widely admired during the interwar period for the quality of his prose and for his reflective travel and maritime writing. In 1921, the American journalist, novelist, essayist and poet Christopher Morley praised what he saw as the "exquisite, considered prose" to be found in Tomlinson's 1918 book of essays, Old Junk:

How direct and satisfying a passage to the mind Mr. Tomlinson's paragraphs have. How they build and cumulate, how the sentences shift, turn and move in delicate loops and ridges under the blowing wind of thought, like the sand of the dunes that he describes in one essay.

Frederic P. Mayer, however, writing in the Virginia Quarterly Review, expressed a less admiring view:

Because his book is labeled fiction, H. M. Tomlinson, with the publication of his first novel, "Gallions Reach," is gaining fame. Before, Tomlinson, essayist and traveler, enjoyed but a limited distinction. Recently, however, and mainly through "Gallions Reach," there has grown a Tomlinson vogue. He has been praised as "a second Conrad." The truth is, Tomlinson does not derive from nor resemble Conrad.

In the preface to his critically-acclaimed short story collection Miguel Street (1959), the novelist V. S. Naipaul cited Tomlinson as an inspiration, and one from whom he learned how to be a writer.

Tomlinson's 1912 travel narrative The Sea and the Jungle, based on his voyage up the Amazon River, came to be regarded as a classic of English travel literature. His writing was also shaped by his experiences as a war correspondent during the First World War, which left him deeply disillusioned by modern industrial warfare.

The literary critic Derek Severn wrote that Tomlinson "was a writer of singular integrity and individuality who published nothing that was not distinguished, whether in essays and criticism, or works of travel, or novels—though these were, in strict terms, the least satisfactory of his books, the whole being usually less than the sum of the parts."
