= Corpus Vasorum Antiquorum =

Research project to document ancient ceramics

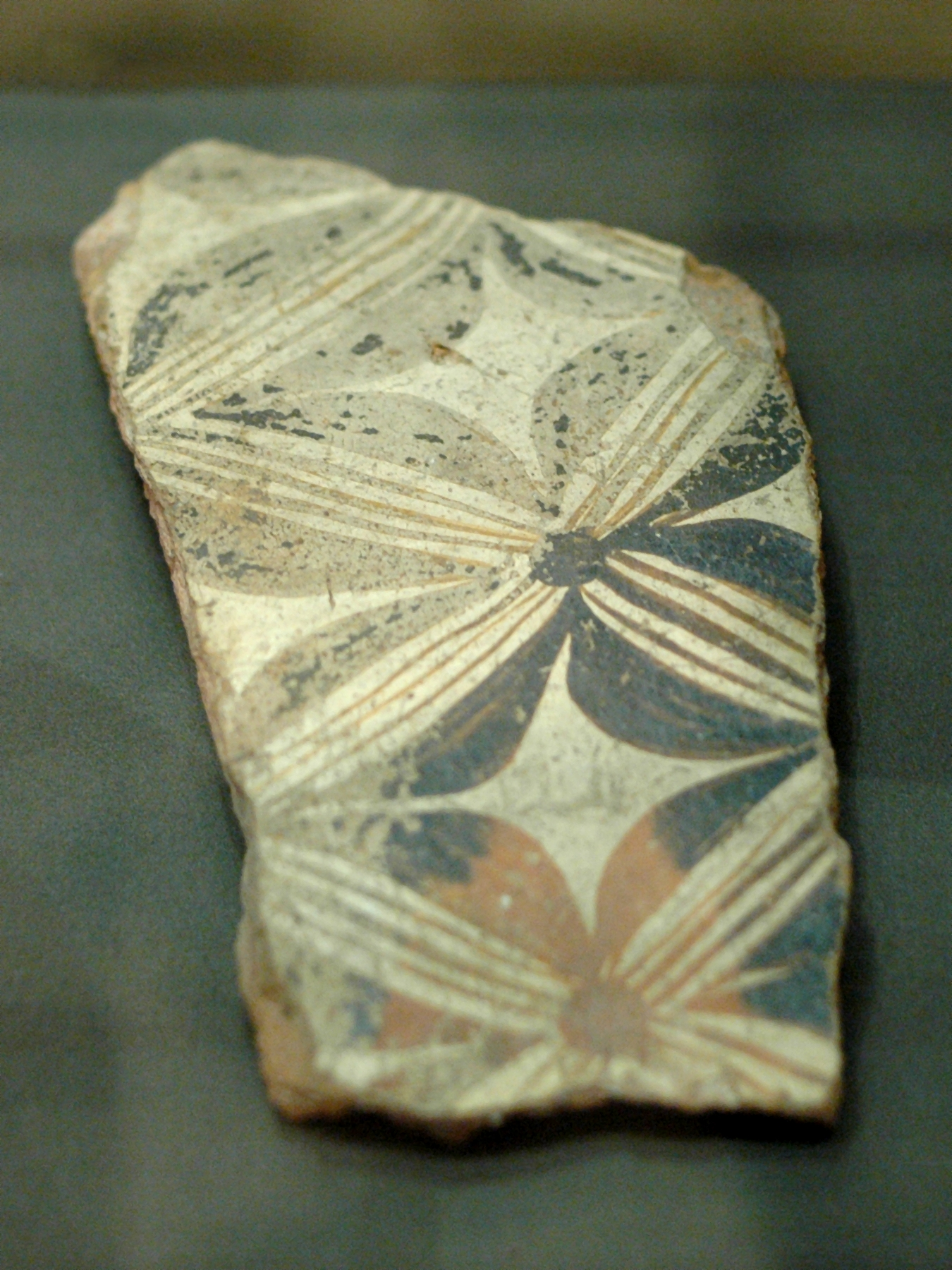
- Fragment of a pithos (large storing jar) with abstract vegetative decoration, found in Cnossos. Terracotta, Palace Style, Late Minoan II (c. 1450–1400 BC). Louvre, first vase published by CVA.
- Author: Various
- Illustrator: Various
- Country: 28 countries (2018)
- Discipline: Art and archaeology
- Publisher: 100+ member museums
- Published: 1923 on
- Media type: Print
- No. of books: 300+ (2018)

Corpus Vasorum Antiquorum ("corpus of ancient vases"; abbreviated CVA) is an international research project for documentation of ancient ceramics. Its original ideal target content: any ceramic from any ancient location during any archaeological period, proved impossible of realization and was soon restricted to specific times and periods. As the project expanded from an original six nations: England, Belgium, Denmark, France, the Netherlands, and Italy, to include the current 28, the topic specializations of each country were left up to the commission for that country. The French commission (Académie des Inscriptions et Belles-Lettres), serves in an advisory position.

The terminology of any commission regarding the target content of any documentation activity must not be confused with archaeological terms. For example, the CVA Online concerns itself with ancient Greek pottery, excluding the pottery of the Bronze Age. Such a decision does not imply that the pottery of the Bronze Age is not ancient Greek, but means only that CVA Online's "ancient Greek" category does not include it.

== Brief history ==
=== Union Académique Internationale ===
CVA is the first and oldest research project of the Union Académique Internationale, a federation of academies (national institutions of an advisory scientific character) from 61 countries (2015), based in Brussels. The Union was the inspiration of Edmond Pottier, at the time Curator of Antiquities at the Louvre, the national museum of France (and former royal palace). His interest in the Union, however, went beyond antiquities to any international scientific project.

He called a meeting of representatives from any interested academies in Paris for May, 1919. The meeting voted the Union into existence. At a second meeting in October, bylaws were passed, after which the Union moved to Brussels; that is, Brussels was made the home of the General Secretariat, which would preside over day-to-day operations between meetings. Its seat would be the Palace of the Academies in Brussels. Maintenance of the Secretariat was to be the responsibility of the Académie royale des Sciences, des Lettres et des Beaux-Arts de Belgique. Its secretary would be the Secretary General of the Union. Henri Pirenne was elected president of the Union.

The meetings in 1919 were foundation meetings. At its end 11 countries had joined, the six mentioned above plus Japan, Netherlands, Poland, Russia, and the United States. In addition three more were under contract, but had not sent representatives: Spain, Norway and Romania. The first assembly of the academies was not until 1920. Operations were to center around research projects, given sequential numbers in order of adoption. Five projects were proposed initially; three were voted, Project Number 1 being the Corpus Vasorum Antiquorum. Currently (2015) it is the first of 76.

=== CVA Project ===
The final decision was to publish a comprehensive catalogue of painted ancient Greek vases. He was also the publisher of the first fascicle for the Louvre in 1922. At that time six countries were part of the project. Today the project covers a compendium of more than 100,000 vases located in collections of 26 participating countries. At present day only public collections located in museums are added to the catalogue.

The CVA mostly publishes Greek (including Italian) pottery between the seventh millennium BC and late antiquity (third-fifth century AD). The publications are divided into fascicles by country and museum. By the end of 2007 a total of 350 volumes consisting of 40,000 fascicles were published. One of the largest amounts of publications was done in Germany: 84 volumes and 3 supplements.

Since 2004 all textual descriptions and images are freely accessible as a web-based database (CVA Online). Languages allowed for publication are English, French, German and Italian. Further publication rules have to be fulfilled. This often requires a restoration of the actual objects. For example: fragments have to be distinctively different from restored parts. For older restorations this is often not the case.

The documentation of a vessel is done in several steps. First the vessel is described in its overall condition followed by an iconographic interpretation. If possible an artist or a workshop will be determined. Integral parts of the documentation are photographs and hand-drawings depending on the condition of the vessel and the projects budget. The last step of the documentation for a CVA volume is a chronologic classification.

=== Scientific and Digital Methods ===
The Austrian commission used for the first-time of the CVA project a 3D scanner for documentation of vessel shapes in 2006. A follow-up project using 3D acquisition was granted and a second volume based on 3D technology published. The high-resolution 3D datasets of the Austrian projects were processed using the GigaMesh Software Framework providing digital profile lines and unwrappings (or rollouts) as basis for the figures of the final publication. Further methods novel to the CVA include computed tomography—in particular X-ray microtomography, multispectral imaging and X-ray fluorescence spectroscopy. In the second half of 2019 rendings including rollouts were shown at the Louvre as part of the 100 years CVA exhibition in the last display cabinet representing the future CVA. Until present day the Austrian commission is the only one using digital methods as well as scientific methods.

== Organization ==
Every participating country is completely responsible for its own scope, while the Union Académique Internationale in Brussels has the patronage traditionally led by a French scientist.

CVA Commissions (selection – more to be added)
| Country | Current leader | Organization | since |
|---|---|---|---|
| Austria | Claudia Lang-Auinger | Austrian Academy of Sciences | 1935 |
| Germany | Paul Zanker (leader qua position), Stefan Schmidt (real leader) | Bavarian Academy of Sciences | 1921 |
| Great Britain | Thomas Mannack | British Academy | 1925 |
| Switzerland | Hans Peter Isler | Swiss Academies of Arts and Sciences | |

== See also ==
- Art in Ancient Greece
- Pottery of ancient Greece

== Sources ==
- Colloque International sur le Corpus Vasorum Antiquorum (Lyon, 3–5 juillet 1956), compte rendu réd. par Charles Dugas. Paris 1957.
- Summary guide to "Corpus Vasorum Antiquorum", compiled by Thomas H. Carpenter and updated by Thomas Mannack. 2. ed. Oxford 2000, ISBN 0-19-726203-1.
- Donna C. Kurtz: A corpus of ancient vases. Hommage à Edmond Pottier . In: Revue Archéologique 2004. S. 259–286.
- Elisabeth Trinkl: Interdisziplinäre Dokumentations- und Visualisierungsmethoden, CVA Österreich Beiheft 1 Verlag der Österreichischen Akademie der Wissenschaften (VÖAW), ISBN 978-3-7001-7145-4, ISBN 978-3-7001-7544-5 (Online), Wien, Österreich, 2013
