= Jacques Morel (writer) =

Jacques Morel (French pronunciation: [ʒak mɔʁɛl]) was a French writer, laureate of the Prix Femina in 1912.

Morel was the pseudonym of Madeleine Pottier, born Madeleine Paule Gorges, the wife of archaeologist Edmond Pottier (1855–1934). Pottier was born on 11 March 1867, and died there on 10 December 1949.

== Works ==
- 1901: Muets aveux, Hachette
- 1905: La Dette, Calmann-Lévy
- 1912: Feuilles mortes, Hachette, Prix Femina.
- 1927: Par un chemin détourné, Armand Colin - Prix d'Académie
- 1930: L'Homme dangereux, Fayard
