= Dominique Rolin =

Belgian novelist

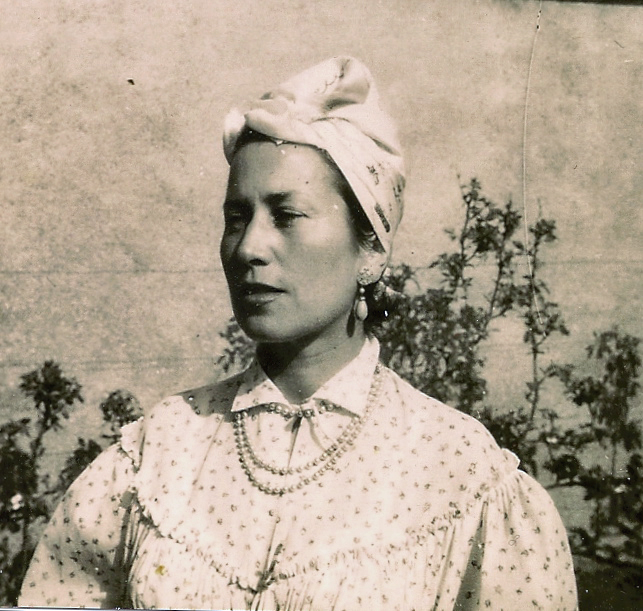
- Born: 22 May 1913; Ixelles
- Died: 15 May 2012 (aged 98); Paris
- Occupation: Writer

Dominique Rolin (French pronunciation: [dɔminik ʁɔlɛ̃]; 22 May 1913 – 15 May 2012) was a Belgian novelist.

Dominique Rolin was a granddaughter of Léon Cladel. Her career was launched by Jean Cocteau and Jean Paulhan during the Second World War. Over some sixty years she developed a unique, feminist voice in French novel-writing, blending seamlessly autobiography and fiction, and centred on two men, her first husband, a sculptor, and avant-garde writer and theorist Philippe Sollers with whom she had a half-century secret relationship. He appeared in her novels as "Jim". She was a Femina Prize winner and a member of the Belgian Royal Academy of French Literature where she succeeded Marguerite Yourcenar.

She was a Commandeur de la Légion d'Honneur.

== Works ==
- Repas de famille (1932), novella
- Les Pieds d’argile (1935), novel
- La Peur (1936), novella
- Marais (1942),
- Anne la bien-aimée (1944),
- Le Souffle (1952), Prix Femina
- Les Quatre coins (1954)
- Artémis (1958)
- Le Lit (1960)
- Maintenant (1967)
- Le Corps (1969)
- Les Éclairs (1971)
- Lettre au vieil homme (1973)
- L’Enragé (1978)
- L’Infini chez soi (1980)
- L’Enfant-roi (1986)
- Trente ans d’amour fou (1988)
- Vingt chambres d’hôtel (1990)
- L’Accoudoir (1996)
- La Rénovation (1998)
- Journal amoureux (2000), novel
- Le Futur immédiat (2001), novel
- Plaisirs (2001),
- Lettre à Lise (2003)

== Awards ==
- Prix Femina, (1952), for Le Souffle.
- Franz Hellens prijs, (1978), for L'Enragé.
- Prix Kléber Haedens, (1980), for L’Infini chez soi.
- Prix Roland Jouvenel of the Académie française, (1990), for Vingt chambres d’hôtel.
- Prix Thyde Monnier, (1991), entire œuvre.
- Grand prix national des Lettres, (2001), entire oeuvre.
