= Gallions Reach (novel) =

Novel by H. M. Tomlinson

First edition (US)

Gallions Reach (1927) is a novel by H. M. Tomlinson first published by Heinemann in the UK and by Harper & Brothers in the US. The book was Tomlinson's debut novel. It was republished by Penguin Books in 1952. It is a literary crime novel, initially set in London, before moving to Malaya. It is notable in that Tomlinson uses real streets and locations for settings.

The protagonist, Jimmy Colet, commits a serious crime near the start of the novel, and, despite originally intending to give himself up, leaves London by ship soon afterwards.

Tomlinson uses the stream-of-consciousness technique throughout the novel.

== Reception ==
Upon its publication in 1927, Gallions Reach received attention from contemporary reviewers. A review in Time (magazine) described the novel as containing “fine and original writing” and noted that some critics had compared Tomlinson’s maritime atmosphere to Joseph Conrad, while questioning the fairness of labeling him an imitator. The novel was awarded the Femina Vie Heureuse Prize for 1928–29, recognising it among notable English-language works of the period.
