= Bernard Grasset =

French editor and publisher (1881–1955)

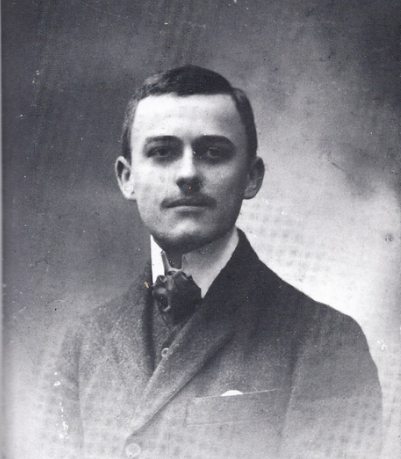
Grasset in 1905

Bernard Grasset (6 March 1881 – 20 October 1955) was a French publisher. He was an innovator in publishing and played an important role in distributing works of contemporary French authors. He invented a new form of literary publicity, modernized typography, and also increased the print runs to 10,000 books on average from the runs of 2,000 that were previously customary.

However, his accomplishments were diminished after World War II, when he was arrested as a collaborator during the German occupation of France.

== Early life ==
Bernard Grasset was born at Chambéry to Eugène Grasset, a lawyer originally from Montpellier, and Marie Ubertin, daughter of a tax registrar. On the death of his father in 1896, Bernard was brought to live in Montpellier by his uncle Joseph Grasset, neurologist and professor of medicine. There he obtained a doctorate in economics, then moved to Paris, where he frequented the Café Vachette, located at 27, boulevard Saint-Michel.

== Career ==
=== Publishing ===
In 1907, Bernard Grasset founded "Éditions Nouvelles" at 49, rue Gay-Lussac (where he took up residence on arriving in Paris). In July of that year, the company published its first book, Mounette, a novel by Henry Rigal. From 1908 on, the publishing house changed its name and became "Bernard Grasset, éditeur." It also moved to 7 rue Corneille.

In 1910, Grasset became the representative of Thomas Nelson. His first major success was the book of pastiches by Paul Reboux and Charles Müller, named À la manière de…, published in the "Cahiers Rouges" collection. Then came two consecutive prix Goncourt, in 1911 with The Keynote by Alphonse de Châteaubriant and in 1912 with Filles de la pluie by André Savignon. He then moved to 61, rue des Saints-Pères, where éditions Grasset is still located.

In 1913, through René Blum, Grasset published, at the author's expense, the first volume of Marcel Proust's In Search of Lost Time, Swann's Way. In August 1917, Grasset resumed publication of the periodical Le Fait de la semaine, which had ceased in August 1914.

The year 1920 marked a prosperous period for him as he launched the "Four Ms"—André Maurois, François Mauriac, Henry de Montherlant, and Paul Morand. In addition, he established a company called Le Livre and opened several bookstores in Paris and Poznań, raising capital of 450,000 francs. In 1921, he entrusted to Daniel Halévy what would become the collection "Les Cahiers verts," whose first book published–and first success–was Louis Hémon's Maria Chapdelaine. In 1922, he founded the Grand Prix Balzac with the support of the arms dealer Basil Zaharoff. For the artistic direction of the house's books, he called first onMaximilien Vox (1922) and then on François-Martin Salvat in 1926.

Numerous authors signed onto éditions Grasset: Raymond Radiguet with Le Diable au corps, Blaise Cendrars with L’Or. La merveilleuse histoire du général Johann August Suter, Jean Guéhenno with Caliban Parle, Jean Giono with Colline, Philippe Soupault with Les Frères Durandeau, Joseph Delteil with Sur le fleuve Amour, Ramuz with La Grande Peur dans la montagne, ou encore André Malraux et La Tentation de l'Occident, Joseph Peyré who signed a contract with the publisher for nine works, among which was Sang et lumières, awarded the prix Goncourt for 1935.

=== World War II ===
During World War II, like most French publishers, Grasset complied with the German occupation; publishers who refused to collaborate faced prohibition of their books or were deprived of paper. Among compliant publishers, however, Grasset stood out for his zeal. In 1940, he wrote (but did not send) three letters defending German censorship, declaring: "I am an authentic Frenchman with none of the unhealthy adulterations that Germany rightly condemns." In 1940, he launched the collection "In Search of France" (French: "À la recherche de la France"), which featured five authors prized by the Nazis, such as Pierre Drieu la Rochelle. Grasset's defenders claim that this was intended to mollify the Gestapo.

After Louis Brun, who had been his right-hand man for 32 years, was assassinated by his wife for infidelity, Grasset called on René Jouglet, a former schoolmaster close to the PCF, who turned on Grasset during Grasset's trial. Grasset associated with the officers of the German army, lunching with them at the Brasserie Lipp. He received his friends at Garches and was nicknamed the César de Garchtesgaden, a reference to Berchtesgaden, Hitler's country home.

He published several authors who would later become collaborationists, namely Fernand de Brinon (France-Allemagne (1918–1934) en 1934), Jacques Doriot (Refaire la France en 1938 and Je suis un homme du Maréchal en 1941), Abel Bonnard (Le Bouquet du monde en 1938 and L’Amour et l’Amitié en 1939), then Jacques Chardonne, Georges Blond (L’Angleterre en guerre : récit d’un marin en guerre in 1941 and L’Épopée silencieuse : service à la mer, 1939-1940 en 1942). In 1922, Pierre Drieu la Rochelle, published by Gallimard and director of La Nouvelle Revue française, published Mesure de la France with Grasset. In 1941, he published Ne plus attendre there as well.

In 1936, Grasset published a book by Adolf Hitler, with a preface underlining that the publication did not indicate approval on the part of the publisher towards the ideas expressed in the book; that same year, he had obtained permission from Maurice Thorez and Leon Trotsky for the same type of output. At the same time, he published Ernst Glaeser and Ernst Erich Noth, German anti-fascist writers who had chosen to flee their country and take refuge in France. In 1942, he refused the Germans' demand to republish Mein Kampf. He also published the Gaullist and François Mauriac.

=== After liberation ===
Grasset was arrested on 5 September 1944 and held at the Drancy internment camp, but was freed a few weeks later for reasons of health. On 9 September, the Publishers' Union expelled Grasset, along with Gilbert Baudinière, Fernand Sorlot, and Jacques Bernard of Mercure de France; Jean de la Hire; and Henry Jamet.

During his trial at the Chambre civile de la Seine (Civil Court of the Seine), Grasset implored the jury to let him keep his company: "This publishing house is my life's work, I beg you to give it back to me whole." Several journalists remarked on the bias evident in the trial; according to La Croix, it was "a monument of errors and implausibilities"; La Gazette de Lausanne called it "a scandalous trial," and La Bataille stated: "Rarely has a trial been tainted with so many irregularities." Cited in his defense were his lack of involvement with the Groupe Collaboration, the lack of witnesses for the prosecution, and his harassment by the Germans for having published antifascist authors.

On 20 May 1948, Grasset was sentenced in absentia for the crime of indignité nationale, to lifelong deprivation of civil rights (dégredation nationale à vie), five years without the ability to travel, and the confiscation of his assets; on 18 November 1949, despite the defense's appeal, the Court upheld his sentence. In the Combat, Grasset wrote in his defense, "I never believed the first word of what I wrote. My only aim was to reconstitute my publishing house. I wrote nonsense, because it was in my interest to do so".

According to historian Pascal Fouché, "It is hard to absolve Grasset for certain, largely tendentious writings," notably depicting Adolf Hitler as "uniquely striving towards German order and glory," and, in an interview in the paper La Gerbe, wishing for the coming of a "new order." Fouché continues: "In going to Vichy to try to get himself named representative of French publishing, Grasset made himself more complicit than the others."

While interned in a clinic at Ville-d'Avray, Grasset underwent several sessions of electroshock therapy and signed his publishing house over to his wife. His nephew Bernard Privat resumed its direction for a time. In 1949, through intervention by Vincent Auriol, Grasset regained his civil rights and was restored to ownership of his publishing house. He notably published Vipère au poing, the first novel byHervé Bazin, as well as works by Jacques Laurent.

On 23 October 1953, he was granted amnesty by the military tribunal that took over from the court of justice. In 1954, he ceded the capital of his publishing house to Hachette.

== Personal life ==
Depressive and a heavy smoker, Grasset frequented the clinic at the château de Garches, on the advice of Jacques Lacan. In 1934–1935, he had to give an account of his mental health before a tribunal, when his sisters wanted to compel him out of his home. This attempt was dismissed in January 1936.

Grasset's second wife was Aymée Fausto Lamare, whom he met at a dinner.

He died in October 1955, at the age of seventy-four. He is buried in Père-Lachaise Cemetery (88th division). In Combat, Gaston Gallimard wrote, "I loved Grasset for his very faults, because they came from passion.''

== Legacy ==
He was an innovator in the domain of publishing. After World War I, he played an important role in the distribution of the works of contemporary authors. He invented a new form of literary publicity, modernized typography, and also increased the print runs to 10,000 books on average from the runs of 2,000 that were previously customary.

In 1923, Grasset hired the 21-year-old son of a banker to teach him the trade, without paying him at first. This young man, Henry Muller, would write a memoir of Grasset in Trois pas en arrière (Three Steps Back), which received the Prix Marcelin Cazes in 1952.

In the 2010s, Grasset's grand-niece, Marie Liang, daughter of Bernard Privat, found in the family apartment after the death of her mother, documents concerning her great-uncle's trial along with the portrait that Jacques-Émile Blanche had made of him in 1924. Since then, she has tried to rehabilitate the memory of Bernard Grasset.

== Bibliography ==
- Remarques sur l’action, Gallimard, 1928
- La chose littéraire, Gallimard, 1929
- Psychologie de l’immortalité, Gallimard, 1929
- Introduction à la chose judiciaire, Grasset, 1930
- Lettre à Friedrich Sieburg sur la France, Grasset, 1930
- Introduction aux souvenirs de Georgette Leblanc, Grasset, 1931
- Remarques sur le bonheur, Gallimard, 1931
- Commentaires, Gallimard, 1936
- À la recherche de la France, Grasset, 1940
- Une rencontre (roman), Grasset, 1940
- Introduction (22 pages) à son édition des Cahiers de Montesquieu, Grasset, 1941
- Les Chemins de l’écriture, Grasset, 1942
- Aménagement de la solitude, Grasset, 1947
- Lettre à André Gillon sur les conditions du succès en librairie, Grasset, 1951
- Comprendre et inventer, Grasset, 1953
- Sur le plaisir, Grasset, 1954
- Évangile de l’édition selon Péguy, Éditions André Bonne, 1955
