= Éditions Grasset =

French publisher

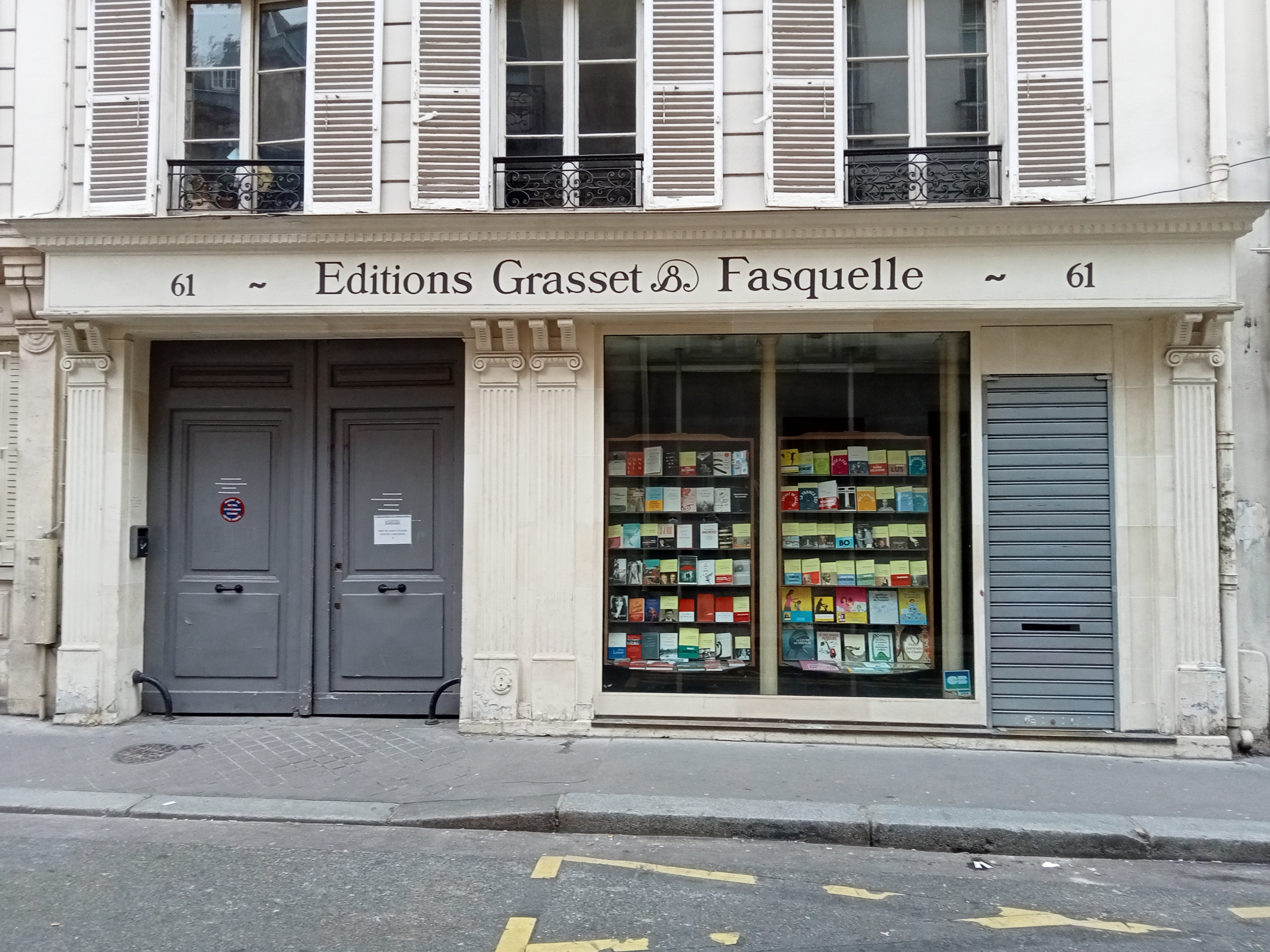
- Parent company: Lagardère Group
- Founded: 1907; 119 years ago
- Founder: Bernard Grasset
- Country of origin: France
- Key people: Yves Berger, Edmonde Charles-Roux, Bernard-Henri Lévy, François Nourissier
- Publication types: Books
- Revenue: €19.5 million (2012)
- No. of employees: 39 (2012)
- Official website: www.grasset.fr

Éditions Grasset (French pronunciation: [edisjɔ̃ ɡʁasɛ]) is a French publishing house founded in 1907 by Bernard Grasset (1881–1955). Grasset publishes French and foreign literature, essays, novels and children's books, among others.

Bernard Grasset sold ownership of the company to Hachette in 1954. In 1967, Éditions Grasset merged with Éditions Fasquelle. Today it operates as a subsidiary of Hachette, which has been owned by Lagardère Group since 1981.

== History ==
=== Under its founder ===
Bernard Grasset was born in 1881 in Montpellier. He received a degree in economics before moving to Paris, where he ran in literary circles and started his own publishing business. The company published a number of successful books in its early years, including Alphonse de Châteaubriant's The Keynote and André Savignon's Les Filles de la pluie, both of which won the Prix Goncourt. In 1913, Grasset published the first volume of À la recherche du temps perdu, by Marcel Proust, Du côté de chez Swann. Proust paid for the publication of his book after it was rejected by other publishers. Bernard Grasset agreed to publish only if Proust covered the entire cost, and told a friend, "It's unreadable."

The company published a number of notable authors, including André Maurois, François Mauriac, Henry de Montherlant, Paul Morand (called the 4 Ms) and later on: Raymond Radiguet, Blaise Cendrars, André Malraux, Pierre Drieu la Rochelle, Fernand de Brinon, Jacques Doriot, Abel Bonnard, Jacques Chardonne, and Georges Blond. The publication of Radiguet's Le Diable au corps was significant not only for its literary merit or the youth of its author, for the amount of publicity Grasset invested in, including posters, photos of the young Radiguet, interviews, and films. This changed the landscape of the publishing industry in France, as firms spent more on marketing their authors to a reading public that became more interested in reading and more unpredictable in their taste.

In 1921, Grasset hired Daniel Halévy to edit a new line of books, Les Cahiers Verts (The Green Notebooks). The first entry in the series was Louis Hémon's Maria Chapdelaine. The series consisted of creative essays and fiction, like Malraux's Tentacion de l'Occident, and lasted through the early 1960s.

Grasset publications were frequent literary prize-winners in France. Alphonse de Châteaubriant won the Grand Prix du roman de l'Académie française in 1923 with La Brière. Maurice Genevoix's Raboliot won the Prix Goncourt in 1925. Other prize-winners include Mauriac's Le Désert de l'amour, André Demaison's Le Livre des bêtes qu'on appelle sauvages, Jacques Chardonne's Claire, Joseph Peyre's Sang et Lumières, Jean de La Varende's Le Centaure de Dieu, Édouard Peisson's Le Voyage d'Edgar, Jean Blanzat's L'Orage du matin, and Paul Mousset's Neige sur un amour nippon.

In 1948 Bernard Grasset was convicted of collaboration with the Nazis in World War II, fined 10,000 francs and sentenced to "national condemnation for life." Bernard Grasset was not the only person in his circle accused of collaborating, as Henry de Montherlant was also condemned for sympathizing with Nazis. Montherlant's book Le solstice de Juin was published by Grasset in 1941, and it hailed the German victory over France in 1940.

In 1954 the company was sold to Hachette. The next year Bernard Grasset's nephew, Bernard Privat, was named the new head of Éditions Grasset. Bernard Grasset died in October of 1955.

=== Under Privat and Fasquelle ===
Bernard Privat formed a partnership with Jean-Claude Fasquelle and eventually merged Grasset with Éditions Fasquelle.

Yves Berger served as literary director for the company from 1960 to 2000.

In 1966, Edmonde Charles-Roux won the first Prix Goncourt for Grasset in the post-WWII era with To Forget Palermo. Jacques Chessex's L'Ogre and Antonine Maillet's Pélagie-la-Charrette also won the prize, in 1973 and 1979, respectively.

In 1981, Grasset's parent company, Hachette, was taken over by Lagardère Group. Bernard Privat left the company, and Fasquelle took over as Grasset CEO. Fasquelle oversaw the creation of a new series, Les Cahiers Rouges (The Red Notebooks), modern classics in a "semi-pocket" format with recognizable red covers.

From 1981 to 2005, Lucien Bodard, Dominique Fernandez, Amin Maalouf, Patrick Rambaud, Pascal Quignard, François Weyergans, published by Grasset, won the Prix Goncourt. Jean-Marie Rouart, Raphaële Billetdoux, François Weyergans, Pascal Bruckner, Dominique Bona, Daniel Picouly, Frédéric Beigbeder, Virginie Despentes, Yann Moix, Olivier Guez, won the Prix Renaudot, from 1984 to 2017.

=== 2000 and after ===
Olivier Nora, former CEO of the Hachette-owned publisher Calmann-Lévy, succeeded Jean-Claude Fasquelle as Chairman of the Board in 2000 and as CEO in 2006. The company continues to publish French and translated literature, including books by non-French authors such as Umberto Eco, Gabriel García Márquez, Colm Toibin, Hanya Yanagihara, and many others.

In 2020, Grasset made news by publishing Vanessa Springora's Le Consentement (Consent). The book is a memoir describing Springora's grooming and sexual abuse as a young teenager at the hands of author Gabriel Matzneff, who was 49 at the time. Matzneff often wrote about pedophilia and sex tourism in his own work, and made no apologies for his predilections after Consent was published. French authorities did bring charges against Matzneff, and for a time he evaded them by remaining out of the country. Two other women came forward with allegations of abuse in 2022, but as of 2023 it seems unlikely that Matzneff will stand trial.

In April 2026, CEO Olivier Nora was abruptly dismissed by Grasset's parent company Hachette Livre, controlled by right-wing billionaire Vincent Bolloré. He was replaced by Jean-Christophe Thiery, a close associate of Bolloré. The move sparked widespread controversy in French literary circles, with over 200 authors publicly announcing their departure in protest. Critics described Nora's ousting as part of Bolloré's efforts to exert greater ideological influence over the publishing group.

== Notable published novels ==
- Une histoire française by François Nourissier, Grand prix du roman de l'Académie française)
- Du côté de chez Swann by Marcel Proust, published at author's expense
- Oublier Palerme by Edmonde Charles-Roux, Prix Goncourt

== See also ==
- Books in France
