= Hennique =

Hennique is a French surname. It may refer to:

- Agathon Hennique (1810–1870), French soldier, governor of French Guiana
- Léon Hennique (1850–1935), French naturalistic novelist and playwright
- Nicolette Hennique (born 1886), French symbolist poet
