= Bernard Privat =

French writer

Bernard Privat (French pronunciation: [bɛʁnaʁ pʁiva]; 25 October 1914 – 11 October 1985) was a French writer and editor.

== Biography ==
Bernard Privat received the Prix Femina for Au pied du mur in 1959.

He was also in charge of the éditions Grasset for over twenty-five years. As Bernard Grasset's nephew, Bernard Privat took the job in 1955. In 1967, along with his friend Jean-Claude Fasquelle, he merged his publishing company with the éditions Fasquelle. He would go on to publish authors such as Yves Berger, François Nourissier, Françoise Mallet-Joris, Matthieu Galey, Françoise Verny, and Edmonde Charles-Roux, who received the Prix Goncourt with Oublier Palerme. Bernard Privat left his job at the éditions Grasset in 1981.

== Bibliography ==
- Cet ange en moi (1943, poetry)
- Églogues by Virgil (1948, translation)
- Armance (1947)
- Au pied du mur, (1959, Prix Femina)
- Une nuit sans sommeil (1966)
- La Jeune Fille (1976)
- L'Itinéraire (1982)
