= Les Soirées de Médan =

Anthology of Naturalist short stories

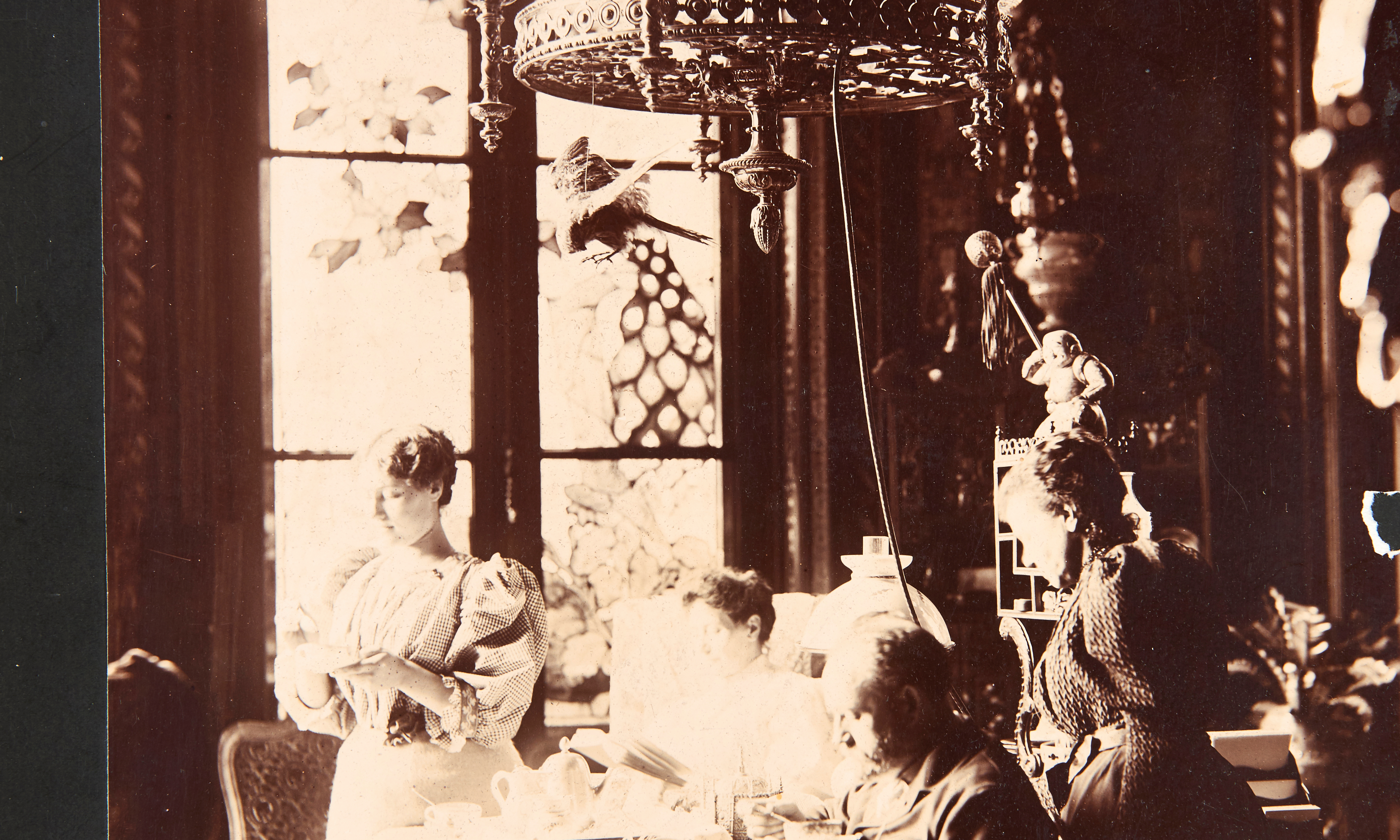
- Les Soirées de Médan
- Author: Émile Zola; Guy de Maupassant; Joris-Karl Huysmans; Henry Céard; Léon Hennique; Paul Alexis
- Language: French
- Genre: Short story collection
- Publication date: 1880
- Publication place: France
- Media type: Print (Hardcover)

Les Soirées de Médan ("Evenings at Médan") is a collection of six short stories by six different writers associated with Naturalism, first published in 1880. All the stories concern the Franco-Prussian War. The contents of the book are as follows:

- L'Attaque du moulin ("The Attack on the Mill") by Émile Zola
- Boule de Suif ("Ball of Tallow") by Guy de Maupassant
- Sac au dos ("Backpack") by Joris-Karl Huysmans
- La Saignée ("Bloodshed") by Henry Céard
- L'Affaire du Grand 7 ("The Affair of the Great 7") by Léon Hennique
- Après la bataille ("After the Battle") by Paul Alexis

The collection took its title from Zola's house at Médan, near Paris, where writers would meet for literary dinners. The authors were often referred to collectively as the "Médan group". The aim of the collection was to promote the ideals of Naturalism, by treating the events of the Franco-Prussian War in a realistic and often unheroic way, in contrast to officially approved patriotic views of the war.

By far the most famous story in the collection is Boule de Suif, which immediately launched the career of the young Guy de Maupassant. Jean Richepin "observed that the most striking stories in the collection—Boule de Suif and Sac au dos—were the work of two talented artists who had no real affinities with Naturalism".

Zola's story became the basis for an opera of the same name by Alfred Bruneau.
