= Jean-Claude Fasquelle =

French editor (1930–2021)

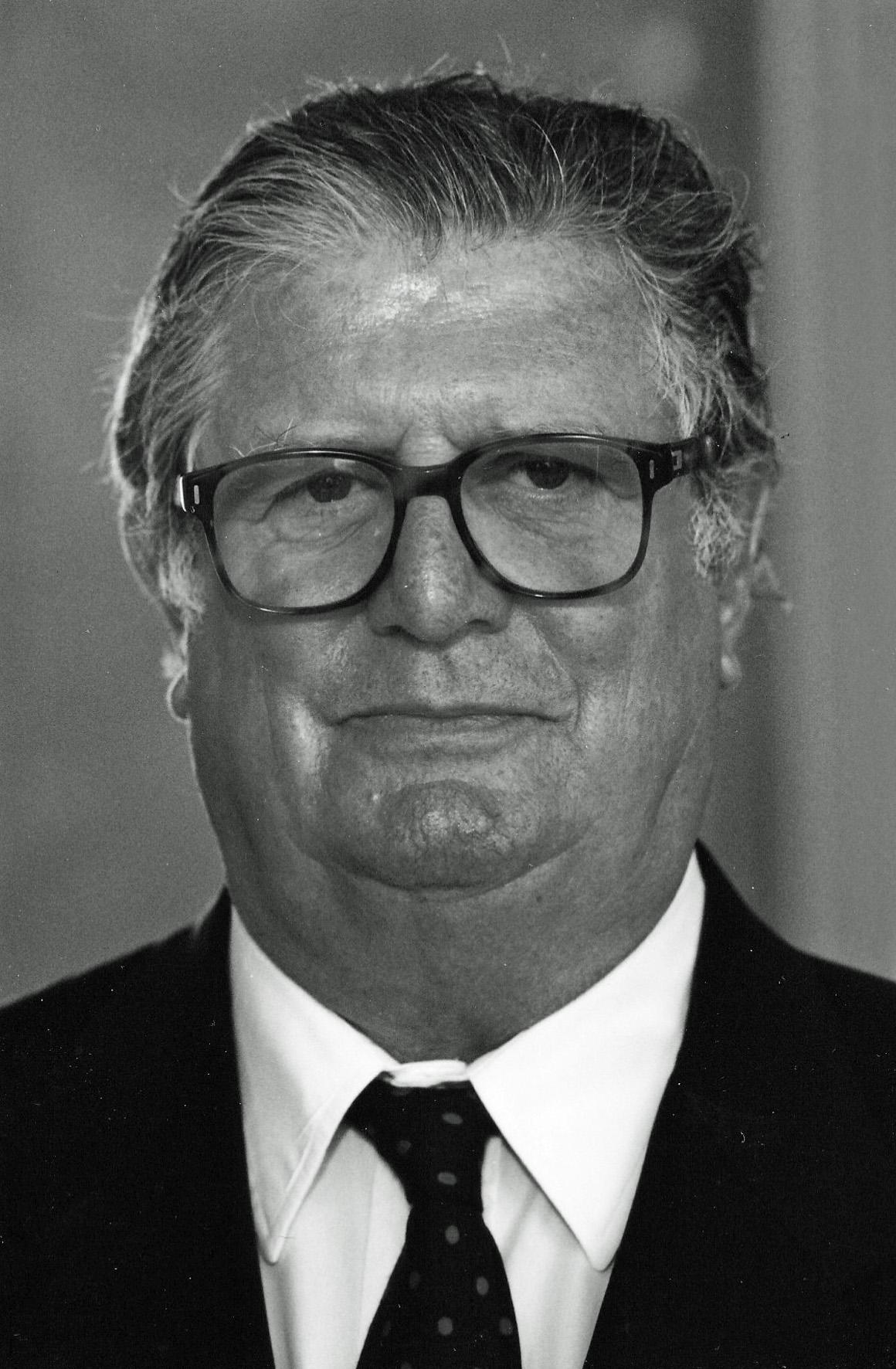
- Jean-Claude Fasquelle au Festival international de géographie 2000
- Born: 29 November 1930
- Died: 13 March 2021 (aged 90); Paris, France
- Occupation: Editor

Jean-Claude Fasquelle (29 November 1930 – 13 March 2021) was a French publisher.

== Biography ==
Born in 1930, Jean-Claude was the son of Charles Fasquelle, himself the son of the founder of Éditions Fasquelle. Jean-Claude Fasquelle graduated with a law degree.

In 1954, he began directing Éditions Fasquelle. The publisher merged with Éditions Grasset in 1959 and he subsequently became director general. He became CEO of the company in 1981 after the retirement of Bernard Privat and became chairman of its supervisory board in 2000. He was succeeded by Olivier Nora. During his time at Grasset, he founded the Libelles collection, which featured authors such as Jacques Audiberti, Jean Cau, Bernard Frank, François Nourissier, Roger Vailland, and others. He oversaw the publication of Brigitte Bardot's autobiography in 1995. His main rival as a publisher was Claude Durand.

In 1970, Fasquelle purchased Le Nouveau Magazine Littéraire, which was sold in the 2000s to Groupe Artémis. From 1985 to 1997, he owned the chess magazine Europe Échecs. After his departure from Grasset, he became honorary president of the publishing house. In 2000, he contributed to Les Hussards. Une génération littéraire, was published by Presses Sorbonne Nouvelle. In 2015, he became a key shareholder for La nave di Teseo, a publishing house founded by Umberto Eco. He served on the judicial boards for the Prix Méditerranée and the Prix Jean Freustié. He was also Vice-President of the Société littéraire des amis d'Émile Zola.

Fasquelle was married to Solange de La Rochefoucauld, who divorced him in 2000 and died in August 2016. The couple had one daughter, Ariane, who died in April 2016. His second wife, Nicky Jegher Fasquelle, died on 13 April 2020. She directed Le Nouveau Magazine Littéraire for more than 35 years.

Jean-Claude Fasquelle died in Paris on 13 March 2021 at the age of 90.
