= Nicolette Hennique =

French poet (1882–1956)

Nicolette Hennique-Valentin
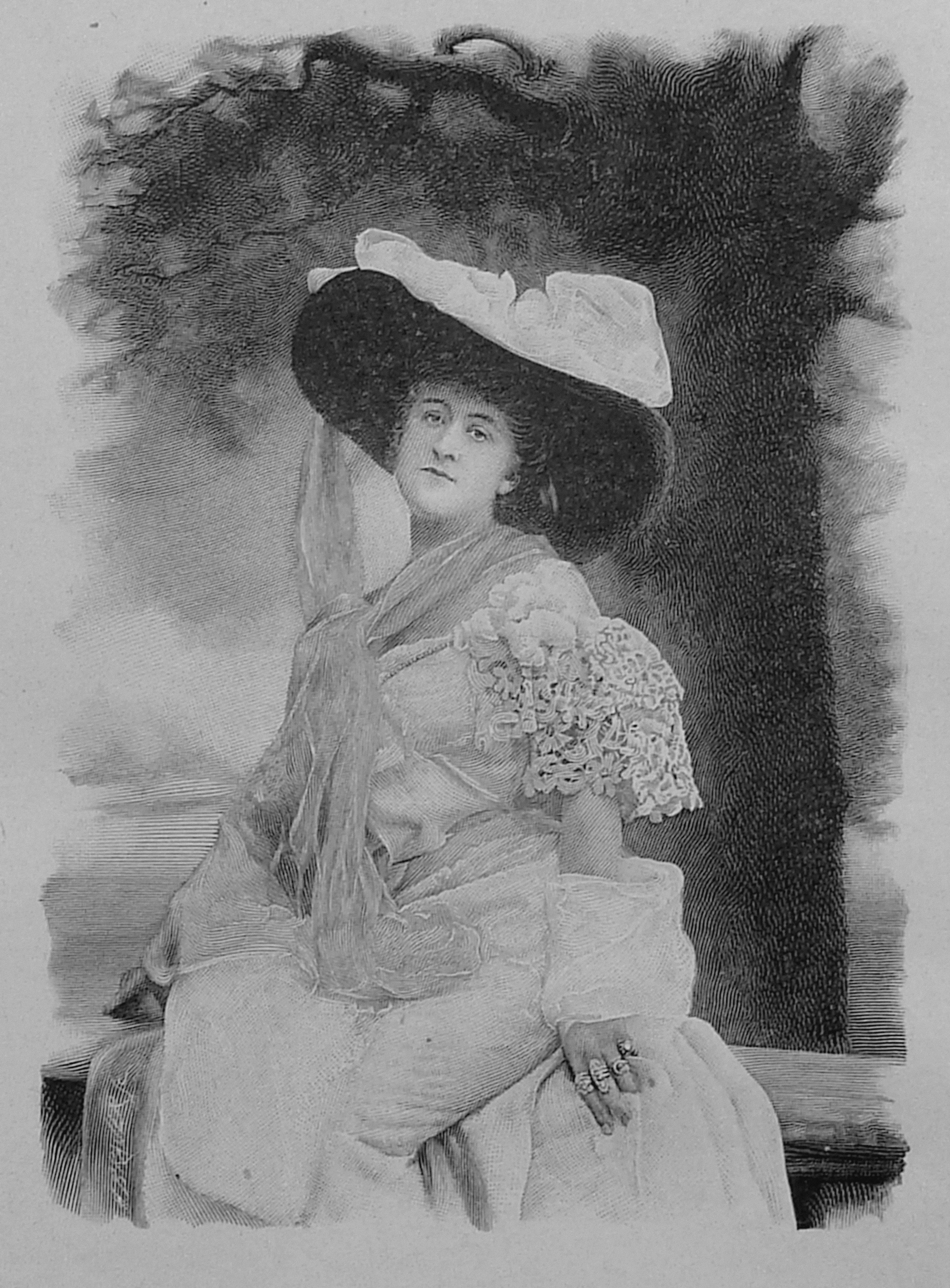
- Engraved Portrait published in the Album Mariani, volume XI, 1908.
- Born: Marquerite Clarisse Nicolette Hennique; 17 April 1882; Paris, France
- Died: 11 April 1956 (aged 73); Rue Hamelin, Paris, France
- Occupation: Poet

Marquerite Clarisse Nicolette Hennique-Valentin (17 April 1882 – 11 April 1956) was a French symbolist poet.

== Life ==
Nicolette Hennique was daughter of the novelist Léon Hennique and Nicolette-Louise Dupont-Châtelain. She was born in Paris on 17 April 1882. She married Pierre Paul Henri Valentin. She inherited the house where Nicolas de Condorcet was born, now the Condorcet Museum. She was a member of the Society for propagation of art books.

Hennique was one of a number of pre-war women poets in France who followed and emulated the symbolism of Stéphane Mallarmé, and who have now been largely forgotten. The highly original work of Hennique and women such as Lucie Delarue-Mardrus, Anna de Noailles, Renée Vivien, Gérard d'Houville and Marie Dauguet astonished the critics, who saw it as a sign of a moral and social revolution as well as a literary one. She contributed to several journals: L'ermitage, L'hémicycle, La revue blanche, La revue and Le gaulois.

In 1955 Hennique published a moving book of memories of her father. This biography, written towards the end of her life, was anecdotal and at times hagiographical. However, it is the most detailed study available, and informative about his links with the Théâtre Libre and the Académie Goncourt, and with contemporary naturalist writers.

== Reception ==
- A review of Des rêves et des choses (1900) in L'He-micycle (15 April 1900) praised its abundant vigour, melancholy and beauty but said what was really new was its profile of a poet with wide and daring dreams, whose beautiful deep eyes caress the contour of things.
- Henri Duvernois classifies her among the Parnassians.
- Nicolette Hennique, almost a child again, has been able to force the attention of scholars with Dreams and Things, Heroes and Gods. (Le Gaulois (Paris, 1968)
- "The strange phenomenon! to sing Greek, to think Greek, to see Greek, to dream Greek, as well as the great Sappho of Mitylene and to call herself floristically Nicolette!" Émile Bergerat

== Publications ==
Publications by Hennique include:

- Nicolette Hennique (1900), Des rêves et des choses, Paris: éditions de la "Revue blanche", p. 140
- Nicolette Hennique (1903), Les douze labeurs héroïques, Illustrated by Gaston Bussière, preface by Julia Daudet, Paris: André Ferroud, p. 47
- Nicolette Hennique (1904), Des héros et des dieux, Paris: E. Fasquelle, p. 257
- Nicolette Hennique (1909), Du vent sur la plaine, Paris: E. Fasquelle, p. 215
- Nicolette Hennique (1912), Invocation (Songs and piano), Music by Joseph Landeroin, Paris: Office musical, p. 8
- Nicolette Hennique (1926), Jean-Baptiste Oudry 1686-1755, Paris: Nilsson, p. 135

Other publications were:

- Nicolette Hennique (September 1898), "Prismes", La revue blanche: 453ff
- Nicolette Hennique (January 1902), "Vulcanales", La revue blanche: 499ff
- Nicolette Hennique (January 1903), "Poèmes", La revue blanche: 421ff
- Nicolette Hennique (1903), "Les douze labeurs héroïques", La Revue blanche (Poems): 450ff
- Nicolette Hennique (1932), "Le Rêve de Bacchis etc.", L'Illustration
- Nicolette Hennique (1959), Mon père, Léon Hennique, Preface by Gabriel Reuillard, éditions du Dauphin

== Sources ==
- Badinter, Élisabeth; Badinter, Robert (2014), Condorcet Un intellectuel en politique (1743-1794) (in French)
- Baguley, David (1994), The Nineteenth Century in Two Parts, Syracuse University Press, ISBN 978-0-8156-2566-7
- Décaudin, Michel (1981), La crise des valeurs symbolistes: vingt ans de poésie française, 1895-1914 (in French), Slatkine, ISBN 978-2-05-100293-6
- Duvernois, Henri (3 April 1904), Girardin, Émile de; Laguerre, Georges (eds.), "Les Livres: Des héros et des dieux", La Presse
- Goya, Francisco; Lafond, Paul (1907), Nouveau caprices de Goya; suite de trente-huit dessins inédits, Paris: Société de propagation des livres d'art
- Hennique, Nicolette (January 1899), "Les yeux", L'Ermitage (in French), Paris
- Hennique, Nicolette (July 1902), "L'âme des pauvres", L'Ermitage (in French), Paris
- Johnson, Graham (2017-07-05), Gabriel Faur?The Songs and their Poets, Taylor & Francis, ISBN 978-1-351-56610-0
- Mirbeau, Octave; Michel, Pierre; Nivet, Jean-Francois (2005), Correspondance Generale (in French), L'Age d'Homme, GGKEY:N8R37X7HPGW
- Nicolette Hennique (1886-19..) (in French), BnF: Bibliotheque nationale de France
- P.-Q. (1993), "Hennique (Nicolette)", in Catulle Mendès (ed.), Le mouvement poétique français de 1867 à 1900 (in French), Slatkine, ISBN 978-2-05-101274-4
