= Camille Laurens =

French writer (born 1957)

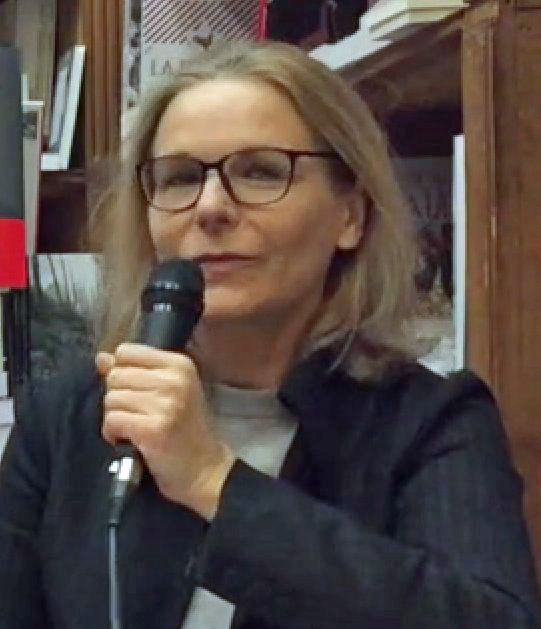
- Born: Laurence Ruel; 6 November 1957 (age 68); Dijon, France
- Writing career
- Pen name: Camille Laurens
- Language: French
- Notable work: Dans ces bras-là (2000)
- Notable awards: Prix Femina (2000)

Laurence Ruel (born 6 November 1957), known by her pen name Camille Laurens, is a French writer and winner of the 2000 Prix Femina for Dans ces bras-là. Laurens is a member of the Académie Goncourt.

== Career ==
A graduate of humanities, Camille Laurens taught in Rouen in Normandy. In 1984, she began teaching in Morocco, where she spent twelve years. Since September 2011, she has taught at Sciences Po.

Between 2007 and 2019, she was a member of the jury for the Prix Femina. She had been a member of the Académie Goncourt since 11 February 2020.

== Fiction and autofiction ==
Although meant to be read separately, the alphabetical titling of the chapters of four of Camille Laurens' first novels—Index (1991), Romance (1992), Les Travaux d’Hercule (1994), and L’Avenir (1998)—suggest a tetralogy. They are characterized by a high degree of fantasy and what Philippe Savary has described as "an abiding reflection on the relationship between fiction and reality, illusion and truth."

The death of a child in 1994 inspired first Philippe (1995) then, again, Cet absent-là (2004) and a deep transformation of her art away from fiction per se and toward autofiction. Thus, from the 1990s onward, she developed an ever more introspective work on the self and her relationship to others, to desire. Hence, texts like Dans ces bras-là (2000), Ni toi ni moi (2006) and Romance nerveuse (2010). The first of these is awarded both the Prix Femina and the Prix Renaudot des lycéens.

== Essays and other publishing activities ==
In addition to fiction, Camille Laurens has authored several essays. Les Fiancées du Diable (2011) studies the representation of women in art and the extent to which the feminine is taboo in collective consciousness and, thus, in works of art. The act of repetition—whether in serial painting, the poetic rime, or else neurosis—is the subject of Encore et jamais (2013). In La Petite Danseuse de quatorze ans (2017), Laurens reconstructs the life of Marie van Goethem, who served as a model for Edgar Degas.

Since 2002, Camille Laurens has regularly chronicled literary works in national newspapers: notably in "Écritures," appearing monthly from 2015 to 2019 in Libération and, since 2019, a weekly serial in Le Monde des Livres.

== Controversy ==
In September 2021, the Prix Goncourt attracted controversy after the jury decided, by a vote of 7 to 3, to include Les enfants de Cadillac by François Noudelmann on its 2021 list of finalists. Laurens, who is a member of the prize jury, is the partner of Noudelmann. Laurens voted in favour of her partner's book. It also emerged that shortly after the shortlist was revealed Laurens had written a negative review in Le Monde of one of Noudelmann's competitors for the prize, La Carte postale by Anne Berest. France Inter, who first revealed the conflict of interest, described her review as containing "unheard-of brutality". Laurens defended herself, saying that she wrote the review before the Goncourt selected its finalists. She also claimed she was being attacked for being a woman and not on the substance of her arguments in the review. However, historian Jean-Yves Mollier said, "She straight-out assassinated one of the candidates." In October 2021, the Académie Goncourt ultimately decided that it will no longer allow lovers and family members of the jury to be entered for consideration.

== Awards and honours ==
- 2000: Prix Femina for Dans ces bras-là
- 2000: Prix Renaudot des lycéens for Dans ces bras-là
- 2006: Finalist in the first selection for the Prix Goncourt for Ni toi ni moi
- 2006: Officier of the Ordre des Arts et des Lettres
- 2008: Prix Bourgogne de littérature for Tissé par mille
- 2016: Prix du Roman-News for Celle que vous croyez
- 2018: Prix David de l'expertise for La Petite Danseuse de 14 ans
- 2018: Prix Ève-Delacroix of the Académie Française for La Petite Danseuse de 14 ans
- 2020: Best Book of the Year by the magazine Lire for Fille

== Works ==
- L'amour, roman. Paris: P.O.L. 2003. ISBN 2867449375. OCLC 51898498.
- Dans ces bras-là. Paris: P.O.L. 2000. ISBN 2867447763. OCLC 45420418.
  - In his arms : a novel. Translated by Monk, Ian (1st U.S. ed.). New York: Random House. 2004. ISBN 0375506527. OCLC 52839016.
  - In those arms. Monk, Ian. London: Bloomsbury. 2003. ISBN 074756132X. OCLC 52738648.
- Laurens, Camille (21 September 2023). Celle que vous croyez. [Paris]. ISBN 9782072716140. OCLC 991711239.
  - Who you think I am. New York. 2017. ISBN 9781590518328. OCLC 960762435.
- Jardins de cristal : Baccarat, Daum, Lalique, St-Louis. Dupont-Rougier, Vincent, 1966- ..., Pôle verrier (Lorraine), Lorraine. Conseil régional. [Paris]: Gallimard. 2008. ISBN 9782070122165. OCLC 470880548.
- Romance nerveuse : roman. [Paris]: Gallimard. 2010. ISBN 9782070119912. OCLC 513673739.
- Les fiancées du Diable enquête sur les femmes terrifiantes. Paris: Editions du Toucan. 2011. ISBN 9782810004461. OCLC 800481629.
- Les travaux d'Hercule : roman. Paris: Gallimard. 2012. ISBN 9782070138227. OCLC 872671200.
- Romance : roman. [Paris]: Gallimard. 2012. ISBN 9782070138234. OCLC 798397522.
- Le grain des mots. Paris: Gallimard. 2011. ISBN 9782070139330. OCLC 820529482.
- L'avenir : roman. Paris: Gallimard. 2013. ISBN 9782070141722. OCLC 848706927.
- Ni toi ni moi roman. [Paris]: Gallimard. 21 September 2023. ISBN 9782070143337. OCLC 893787747.
- La petite danseuse de quatorze ans. Paris: Stock. 2017. ISBN 9782234069282. OCLC 1003642990.
  - Little Dancer Aged Fourteen: The True Story Behind Degas's Masterpiece. Other Press. 2018.
- Fille. Paris: Gallimard. 2010.
  - Girl. Translated by Adriana Hunter. New York: Other Press. 2022.
