= René Benjamin =

French writer

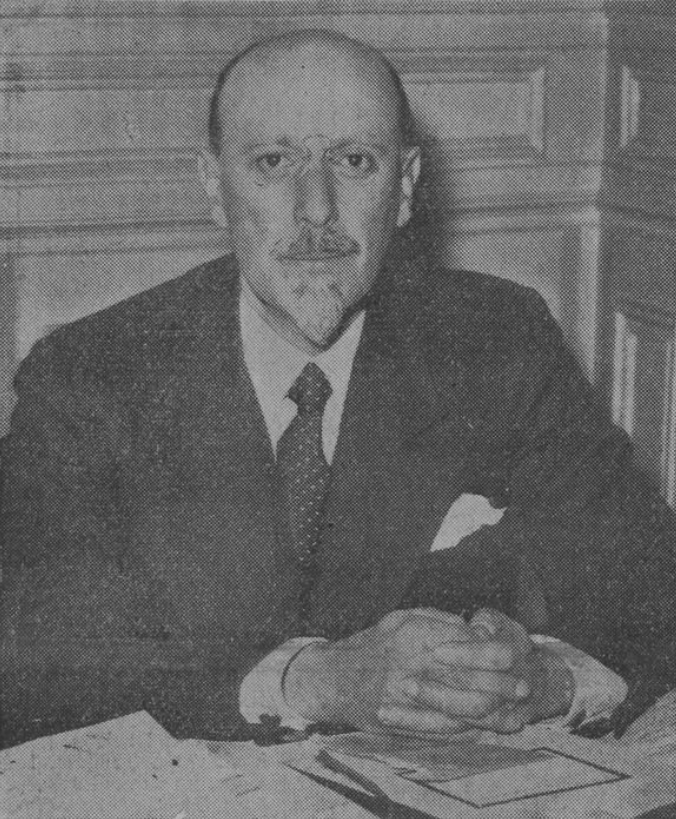
- Born: 20 March 1885; Paris
- Died: 4 October 1948; Tours
- Occupation: Writer

Signature
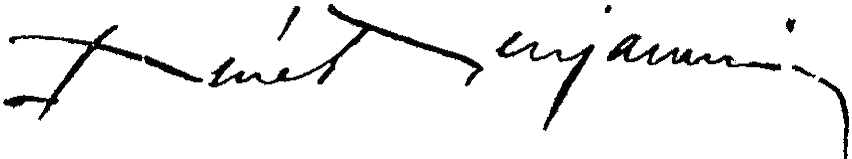

René Benjamin (French pronunciation: [ʁəne bɛ̃ʒamɛ̃]; 1885 in Paris, France - 1948 in Tours, France) was a French writer. In 1915 he received the Prix Goncourt for his novel Gaspard. In 1938, he became the first Goncourt laureate to be appointed a member of the Académie Goncourt, the jury that decides the winner of the prize.
