= Léon Hennique =

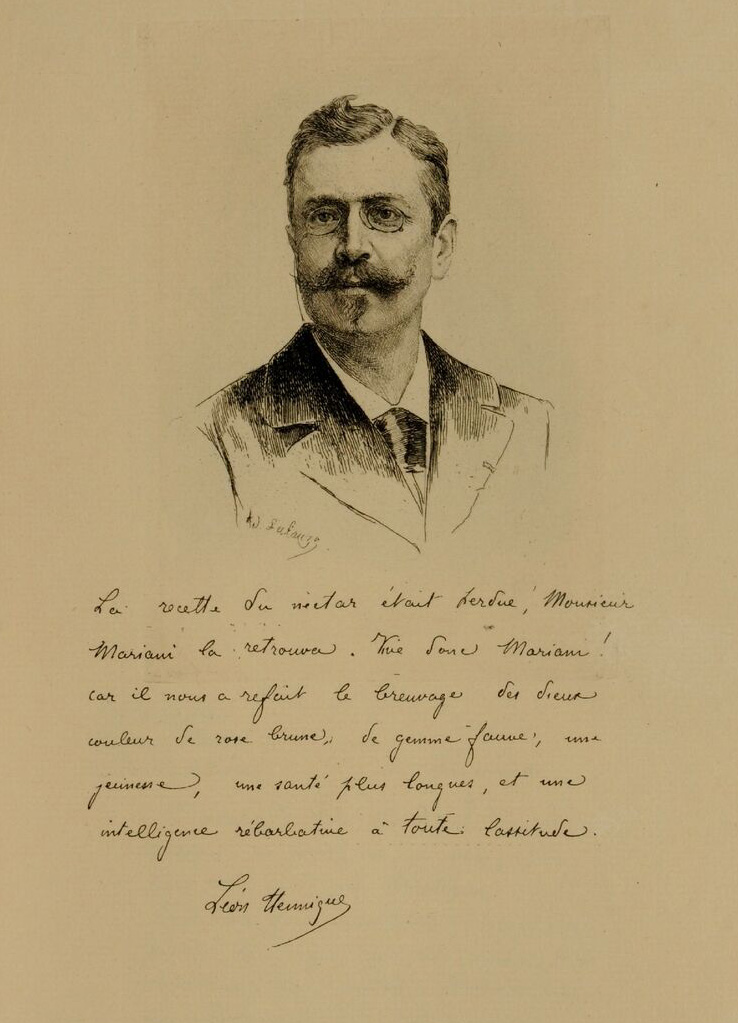
Léon Hennique.

Léon Hennique (4 November 1850, Basse-Terre, Guadeloupe - 25 December 1935, Paris) was a French naturalistic novelist and playwright. He is buried at Ribemont.

== Life ==
Léon Hennique was born in Basse-Terre, Guadeloupe, the son of the naval infantry officer Agathon Hennique. He studied painting, but after the Franco-Prussian War of 1870 devoted himself to literature and became a naturalistic novelist and dramatist. He was friends with Émile Zola, eventually breaking with him over the Dreyfus Affair.

Guy de Maupassant dedicated his novel, "La Rempailleuse", to him.

As a fellow testamentary and legatee with Alphonse Daudet and Edmond de Goncourt, he helped found the Académie Goncourt. He served as its president from 1907 to 1912, when he resigned after casting the deciding vote to break a tie in a "tumultuous" contest between Julien Benda's L'Ordination and André Savignon's novel Les filles de la pluie (the winner).

He contributed to Les Soirées de Médan (1880), with his L'Affaire du Grand 7.

He was appointed as a knight of the Legion of Honor in 1895. He was later promoted to an officer in 1908, then a commander in 1932. With each promotion he received, he was decorated by a member of the Académie Goncourt: Alphonse Daudet on January 27, 1985, then Gustave Geoffroy on February 5, 1908, and finally Pol Neveux on March 7, 1932.

His daughter was the symbolist poet Nicolette Hennique.

== Works ==
Novels

- La Dévouée (1878)
- L'Accident de M. Hébert (1883)
- Pœuf (1887)
- Un Caractère (1889)
- Minnie Brandon (1899)

Novellas

- Deux Nouvelles (1881) [In English translation: Two Novellas: Francine Cloarec's Funeral & Benjamin Rozes; Sunny Lou Publishing, ISBN 978-1-95539-204-4, 2021.]

Plays

- L'Empereur Dassoucy (1879)
- Pierrot sceptique (with Joris-Karl Huysmans, 1881)
- Jacques Damour (1887)
- Esther Brandès (1887)
- La Mort du duc d'Enghien (1888)
- Amour (1890)
- La Menteuse (1892)
- L'Argent d'autrui (1893)
- Deux Patries (1895)
- La Petite Paroisse (with Alphonse Daudet, 1895)
- Jarnac (with Johannès Gravier, 1909)

== Sources ==
- "Léon Hennique", Libreriausados.com.ar (in French), archived from the original on 2018-08-11
