= Académie Goncourt =

French literary organization

The Société littéraire des Goncourt (French pronunciation: [sɔsjete liteʁɛʁ de ɡɔ̃kuʁ], Goncourt Literary Society), usually called the Académie Goncourt ([akademi ɡɔ̃kuʁ], Goncourt Academy), is a French literary organisation based in Paris. It was founded in 1882 by the French writer and publisher Edmond de Goncourt (1822–1896), who wanted to create a new way to encourage literature in France and disagreed with the contemporary policies of the Académie Française.

== Formation and organisation ==
Wishing to honour his deceased brother Jules (1830–1870), Goncourt bequeathed his estate to establish an organisation to promote literature in France. He named his friend, the writer Alphonse Daudet, along with Léon Hennique, to oversee and administer his estate. The society was to consist of ten members, of whom eight were nominated in the will. Each of the members was to receive an annuity of 6,000 francs, and a yearly prize of 5,000 francs was to be awarded to the author of some work of fiction. After some litigation, the academy was constituted in 1903. Since then, each December, a ten-member board of the Académie has awarded the Prix Goncourt for the best work of fiction of the year.

Membership is reserved to writers who have produced works in the French language, but it is not limited to citizens of France. In 1996, the Spanish novelist and scriptwriter Jorge Semprún was elected as the first foreigner to become a member of the academy.

In addition to the Prix Goncourt, which comes with a symbolic cheque of 10 euros, the Académie Goncourt awards honours for first novel and achievements in short story, poetry and biography genres.

The ten members of the academy are usually called les Dix (the Ten). They meet the first Tuesday of each month, except in summer. Since 1914, they have convened in an oval room, the salon Goncourt, on the second floor of the restaurant Drouant, place Gaillon, in the heart of Paris. The cutlery which they use while dining there constitutes the main physical continuity of the academy. Each new member receives the fork and knife of the member whom he (or she) is replacing, and the member's name is engraved on the knife and the fork.

== Current members ==
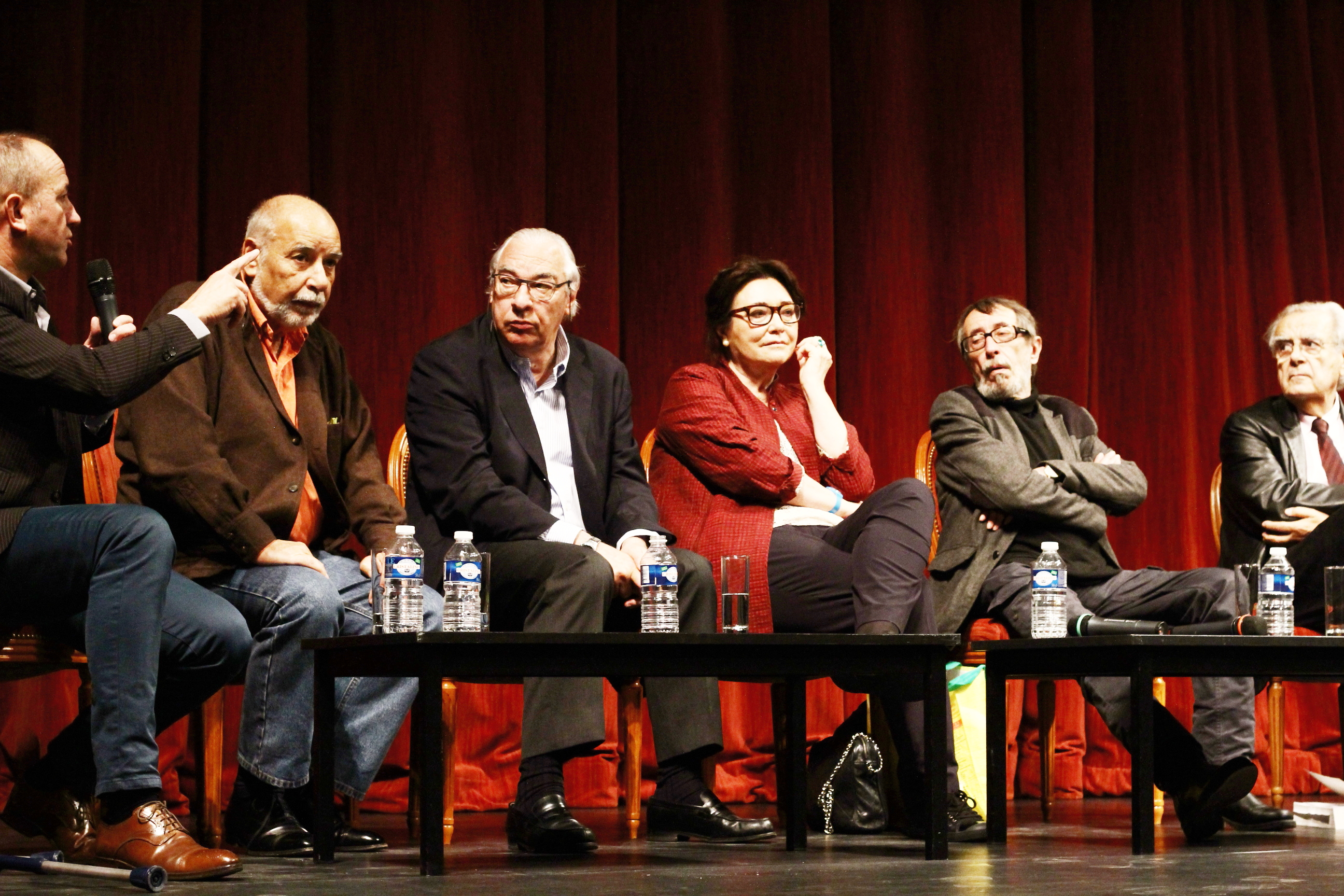
Members of the Académie Goncourt in 2013. From left to right: Philippe Claudel, Tahar Ben Jelloun, Didier Decoin, Paule Constant, Patrick Rambaud, Bernard Pivot

As of 2020, the members of the Académie Goncourt are:

- Didier Decoin, elected 1995; President
- Françoise Chandernagor, elected 1995; Vice President
- Tahar Ben Jelloun, elected 2008
- Patrick Rambaud, elected 2008
- Philippe Claudel, elected 2012; Secretary General
- Pierre Assouline, elected 2012
- Paule Constant, elected 2013
- Éric-Emmanuel Schmitt, elected 2016
- Pascal Bruckner, elected 2020
- Camille Laurens, elected 2020

== Academicians by seat ==
=== 1st Seat ===
- 1900–1942 : Léon Daudet
- 1942–1944 : Jean de La Varende
- 1944–1954 : Colette
- 1954–1970 : Jean Giono
- 1971–1977 : Bernard Clavel
- 1977–2004 : André Stil
- 2004–2019 : Bernard Pivot
- 2020–present : Pascal Bruckner

=== 2nd Seat ===
- 1900–1907 : Joris-Karl Huysmans
- 1907–1910 : Jules Renard
- 1910–1917 : Judith Gautier
- 1918–1924 : Henry Céard
- 1924–1939 : Pol Neveux
- 1939–1948 : Sacha Guitry
- 1949–1983 : Armand Salacrou
- 1983–2016 : Edmonde Charles-Roux
- 2016–present : Éric-Emmanuel Schmitt

=== 3rd Seat ===
- 1900–1917 : Octave Mirbeau
- 1917–1947 : Jean Ajalbert
- 1947–1973 : Alexandre Arnoux
- 1973–1995 : Jean Cayrol
- 1995–present : Didier Decoin

=== 4th Seat ===
- 1900–1940 : J.-H. Rosny aîné
- 1940–1942 : Pierre Champion
- 1943–1971 : André Billy
- 1971–2012 : Robert Sabatier
- 2013–present : Paule Constant

=== 5th Seat ===
- 1900–1948 : J.-H. Rosny jeune
- 1948–1967 : Gérard Bauër
- 1967–1968 : Louis Aragon
- 1969–1983 : Armand Lanoux
- 1983–2008 : Daniel Boulanger
- 2008–present : Patrick Rambaud

=== 6th Seat ===
- 1900–1935 : Léon Hennique
- 1936–1950 : Léo Larguier
- 1951–1977 : Raymond Queneau
- 1977–2008 : François Nourissier
- 2006–present : Tahar Ben Jelloun

=== 7th Seat ===
- 1900–1918 : Paul Margueritte
- 1919–1923 : Émile Bergerat
- 1924–1937 : Raoul Ponchon
- 1938–1948 : René Benjamin
- 1949–1971 : Philippe Hériat
- 1972–2011 : Michel Tournier
- 2011–2015 : Régis Debray
- 2016–2020 : Virginie Despentes
- 2020–present : Camille Laurens

=== 8th Seat ===
- 1900–1926 : Gustave Geffroy
- 1926–1929 : Georges Courteline
- 1929–1973 : Roland Dorgelès
- 1973–1995 : Emmanuel Roblès
- 1995–present : Françoise Chandernagor

=== 9th Seat ===
- 1900–1925 : Élémir Bourges
- 1926–1937 : Gaston Chérau
- 1937–1958 : Francis Carco
- 1958–1996 : Hervé Bazin
- 1996–2011 : Jorge Semprún
- 2012–present : Philippe Claudel

=== 10th Seat ===
- 1900–1949 : Lucien Descaves
- 1950–1970 : Pierre Mac Orlan
- 1970–2011 : Françoise Mallet-Joris
- 2012–present : Pierre Assouline
