= Aydie =

- Commune
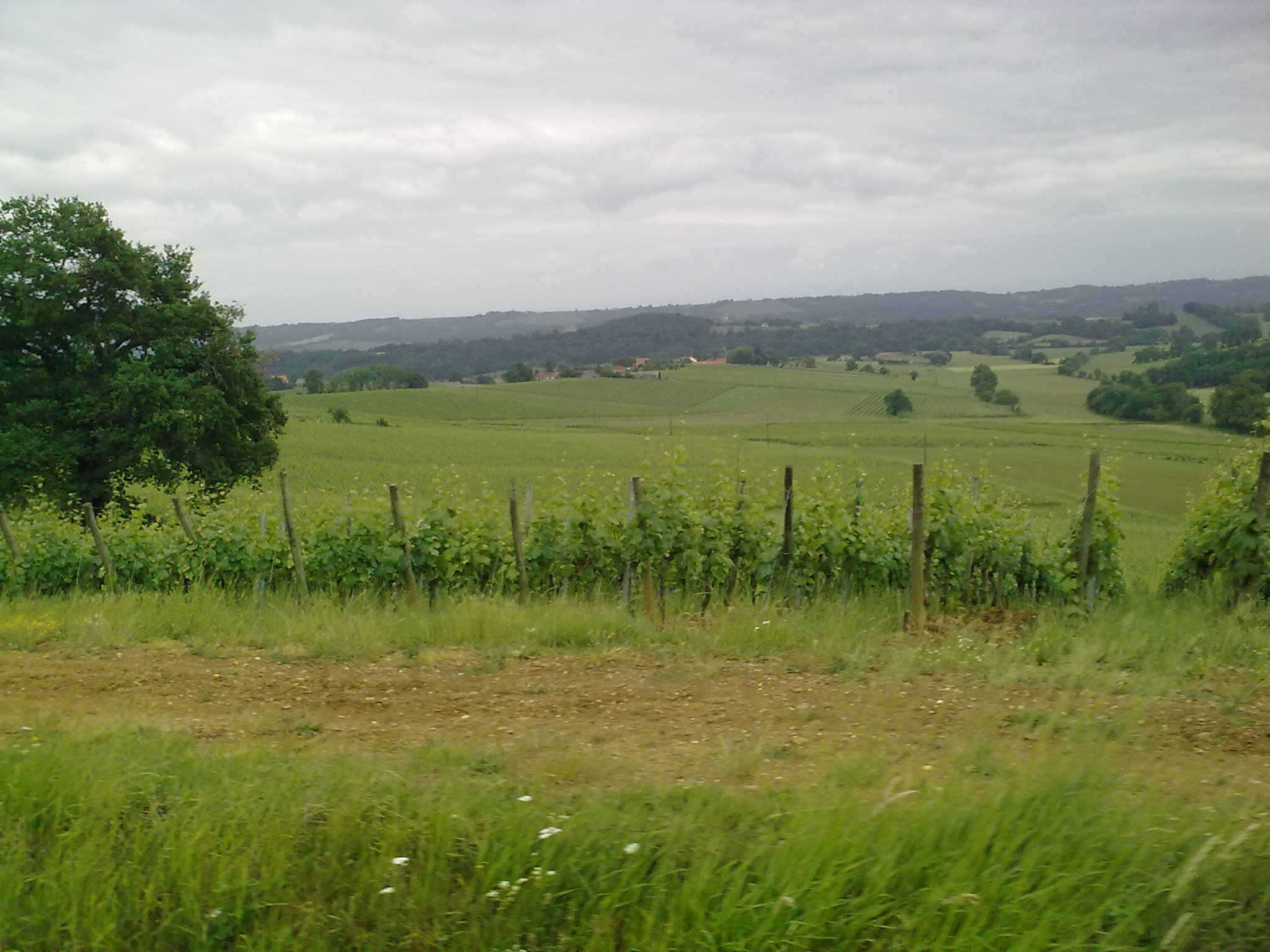
- Vineyards in Aydie
- Location of Aydie
- Location within France Location within Nouvelle-Aquitaine
- Coordinates: 43°34′14″N 0°06′13″W
- Country: France
- Region: Nouvelle-Aquitaine
- Department: Pyrénées-Atlantiques
- Arrondissement: Pau
- Canton: Terres des Luys et Coteaux du Vic-Bilh
- Intercommunality: CC Luys Béarn

Government
  - Mayor (2020–2026): Jean-Paul Cazenave
- Area^{1}: 7.86 km^{2} (3.03 sq mi)
- Elevation: 148 m (486 ft)
- Highest elevation: 258 m (846 ft)
- Lowest elevation: 129 m (423 ft)
- Population (2023): 130
  - Density: 17/km^{2} (43/sq mi)
- Time zone: UTC+01:00 (CET)
  - Summer (DST): UTC+02:00 (CEST)
- INSEE/Postal code: 64084 /64330
- ^{1} French Land Register data, which excludes lakes, ponds, glaciers > 1 km^{2} (0.386 sq mi or 247 acres) and river estuaries.

Aydie (French pronunciation: [ajdi]; Occitan: Aidia) is a commune in the Pyrénées-Atlantiques department in the Nouvelle-Aquitaine region of south-western France.

== Geography ==
Aydie is located some 40 km north-east of Pau and 15 km east of Garlin. The northern border of the commune is the departmental border between Pyrénées-Atlantiques and Gers and the eastern border is the border with Hautes-Pyrénées. Access to the commune is by the D292 road from Aubous to Arrosès which passes south through the west of the commune. The D317 branches off the D205 west of the commune and goes east through the commune to the village then continues east, changing to the D548 at the border, to join the D48. The commune is mainly farmland with scattered forests in the west.

The Sager river forms the eastern border of the commune as it flows north to join the Adour at Saint-Mont. Several streams rise in the west of the commune and flow east to join the Sager including the Boutigué which forms part of the northern border of the commune.

=== Places and Hamlets ===
- Aveillé
- Bardou
- Bayliot
- Boutigué
- Cau
- Caunille
- Le Château
- Curon
- Dabadie
- Estrémau
- Hardoy
- Jouandou
- Laforêt
- Lafosse
- Larribau
- Larrouy
- Laudique
- Lerp
- Maillet
- Marty
- Mondain
- Moulié
- Mourchette
- Moutha
- Parthonnaud
- Pellé
- Pessus
- Poey
- le Pucheu
- Saint-Martin
- Thillet

== Toponymy ==
The commune name in béarnais is Aidia. Michel Grosclaude said that the name probably has a common root with Aydius but the origin and meaning of the name remains obscure.

The following table details the origins of the commune name and other names in the commune.

Name	Spelling	Date	Source	Page	Origin	Description
Aydie	Aidie	1385	Raymond	18	Census	Village
	Aydia	1542	Raymond	18	Census of Conchez B730, folio 93	
	Ayrie	1675	Raymond	18	Reformation	
	Aydie	1750	Cassini			
Abbadie	Labadie	1385	Raymond	1	Census	Farm
	Abbadie	1863	Raymond	1		
Le Bernet	Le Bernet	1863	Raymond	29		Place
Couquillon	Couquillon	1863	Raymond	53		Place
L'Herm	Lerm	1538	Raymond	77	Reformation	Hamlet
	L'Herm	1863	Raymond	77		(Vassal of the Viscounts of Bearn)
Mondérous	Mondérous	1863	Raymond	115		Vineyard
Les Moulères	Les Moulères	1863	Raymond	118		Place
Le Pas du Ber	Le Pas du Ber	1863	Raymond	132		Place
Pouey	Lo Poey de Seubemea	1487	Raymond	136	Establishments	Hamlet
	Lo Poey de Solamea	1546	Raymond	136	Reformation	
	Le Poey Sauvemea	1683	Raymond	136	Reformation	
	Poey	1750	Raymond	136	Cassini	
	Le Poey de Sauvemea	1863	Raymond	136		

Sources:

- Raymond: Topographic Dictionary of the Department of Basses-Pyrenees, 1863, on the page numbers indicated in the table. (in French)
- Grosclaude: Toponymic Dictionary of communes, Béarn, 2006 (in French)
- Cassini: Cassini Map from 1750

Origins:

- Census: Census of Béarn
- Reformation: Reformation of Béarn
- Establishments: Register of Establishments of Béarn

== History ==
Paul Raymond noted on page 18 of his 1863 dictionary that in 1395 Aydie had 25 fires and Poey (Page 136) had 6 fires with both of them under the bailiwick of Lembeye.

== Administration ==
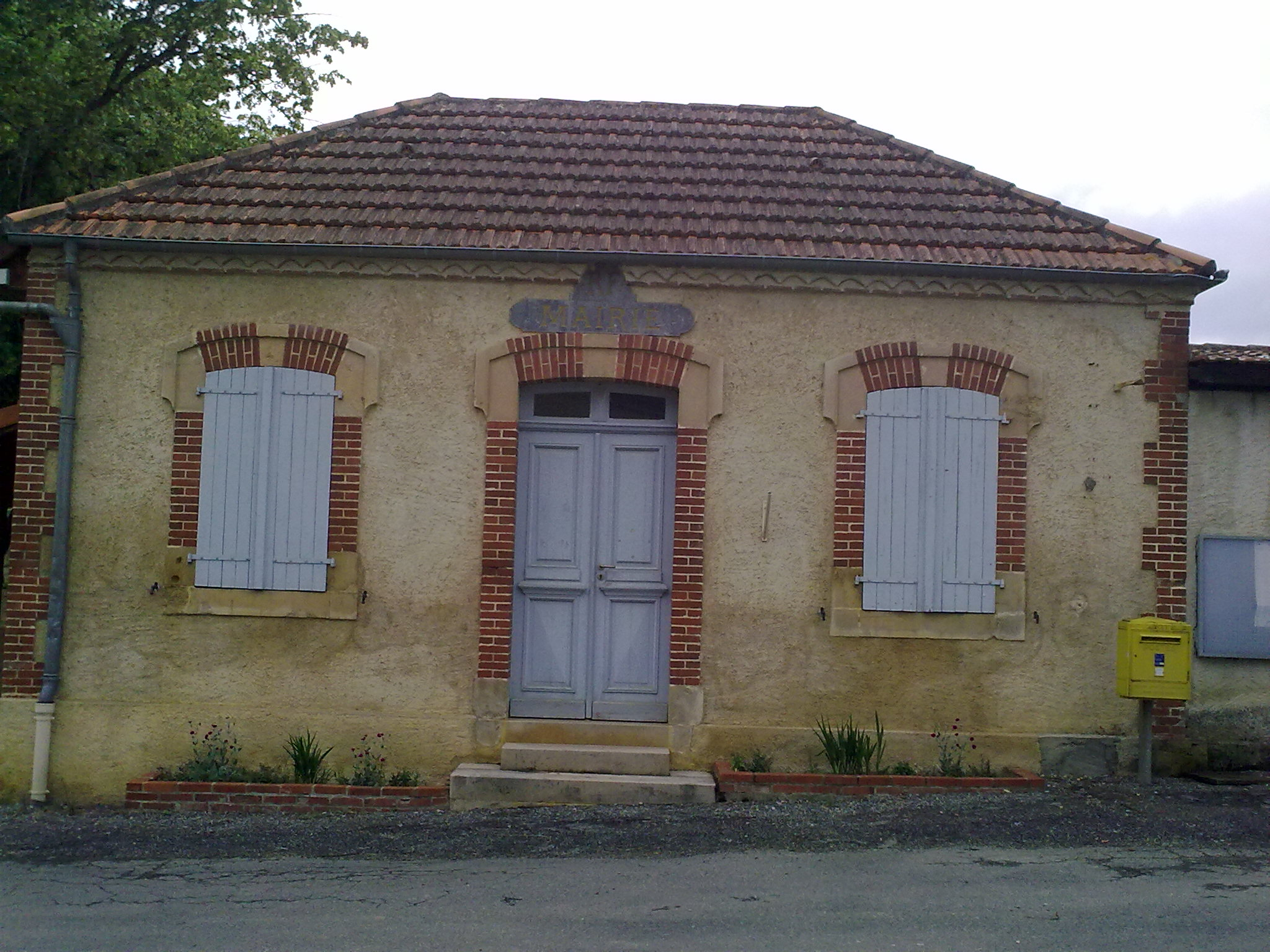
The Town Hall

List of Successive Mayors

From	To	Name
1995	2020	Maurice Lacoste
2020	2026	Jean-Paul Cazenave

=== Inter-communality ===
The commune is part of five inter-communal structures:

- the Communauté de communes des Luys en Béarn;
- the SIVU for roads in the Garlin region;
- the SIVU for the Lées and its tributaries;
- the Energy association of Pyrénées-Atlantiques;
- the inter-communal association for drinking water in Luy-Gabas-Lées;

== Demography ==
Historical population

Year	Pop.	±% p.a.
1793	118	—
1821	502	+5.31%
1846	570	+0.51%
1872	474	−0.71%
1901	410	−0.50%
1926	272	−1.63%
1946	231	−0.81%
1962	197	−0.99%
1968	191	−0.51%

Year	Pop.	±% p.a.
1975	173	−1.40%
1982	167	−0.50%
1990	165	−0.15%
1999	136	−2.12%
2007	149	+1.15%
2012	130	−2.69%
2017	140	+1.49%
2023	130	−1.23%

Source: EHESS and INSEE

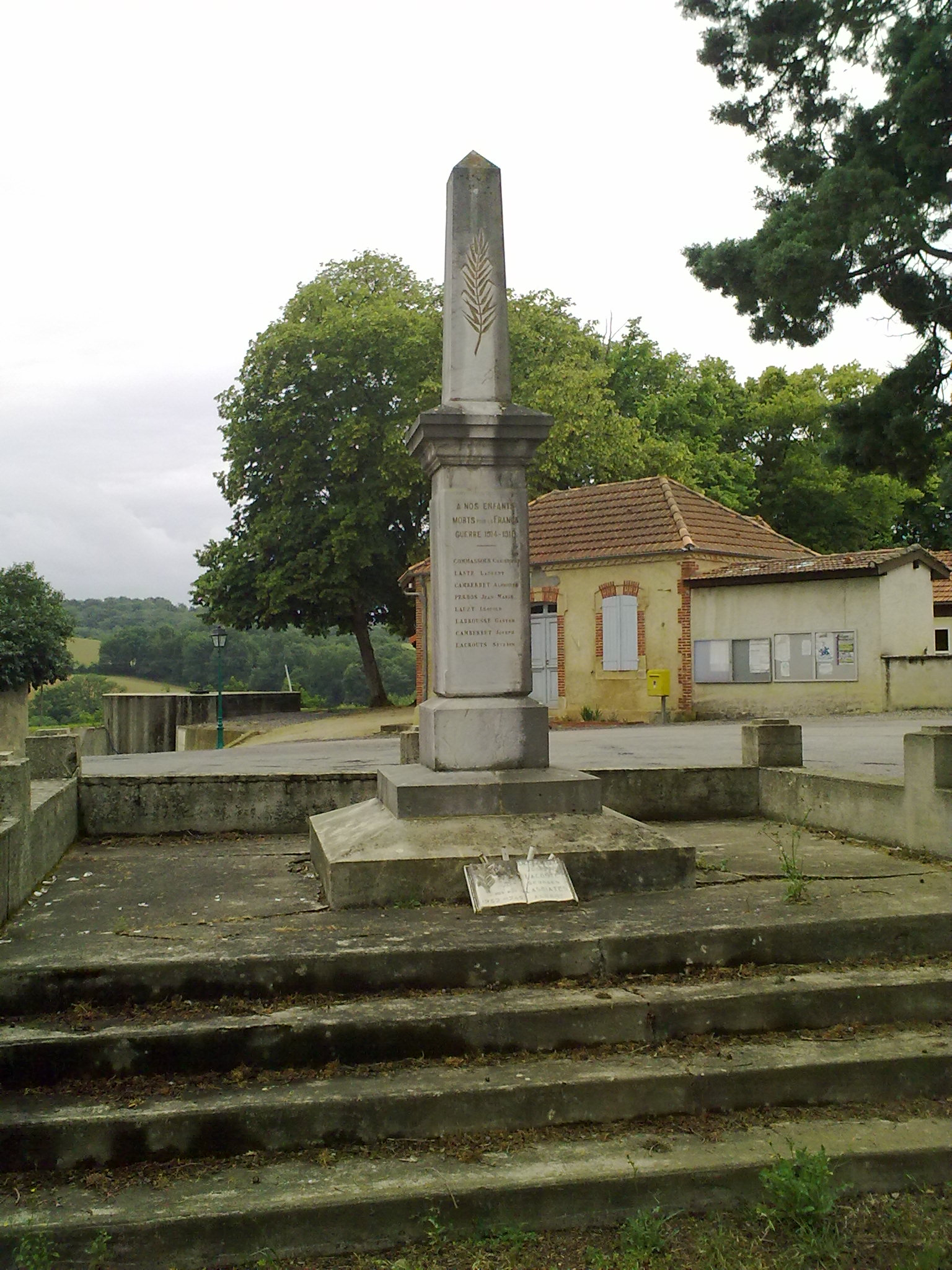
The War Memorial

== Economy ==
The commune is part of the appellation d'origine contrôlée (AOC) zones of Madiran (Red Madiran wine), Pacherenc-du-vic-bilh (White Madiran wine), and Béarn.

== Culture and heritage ==
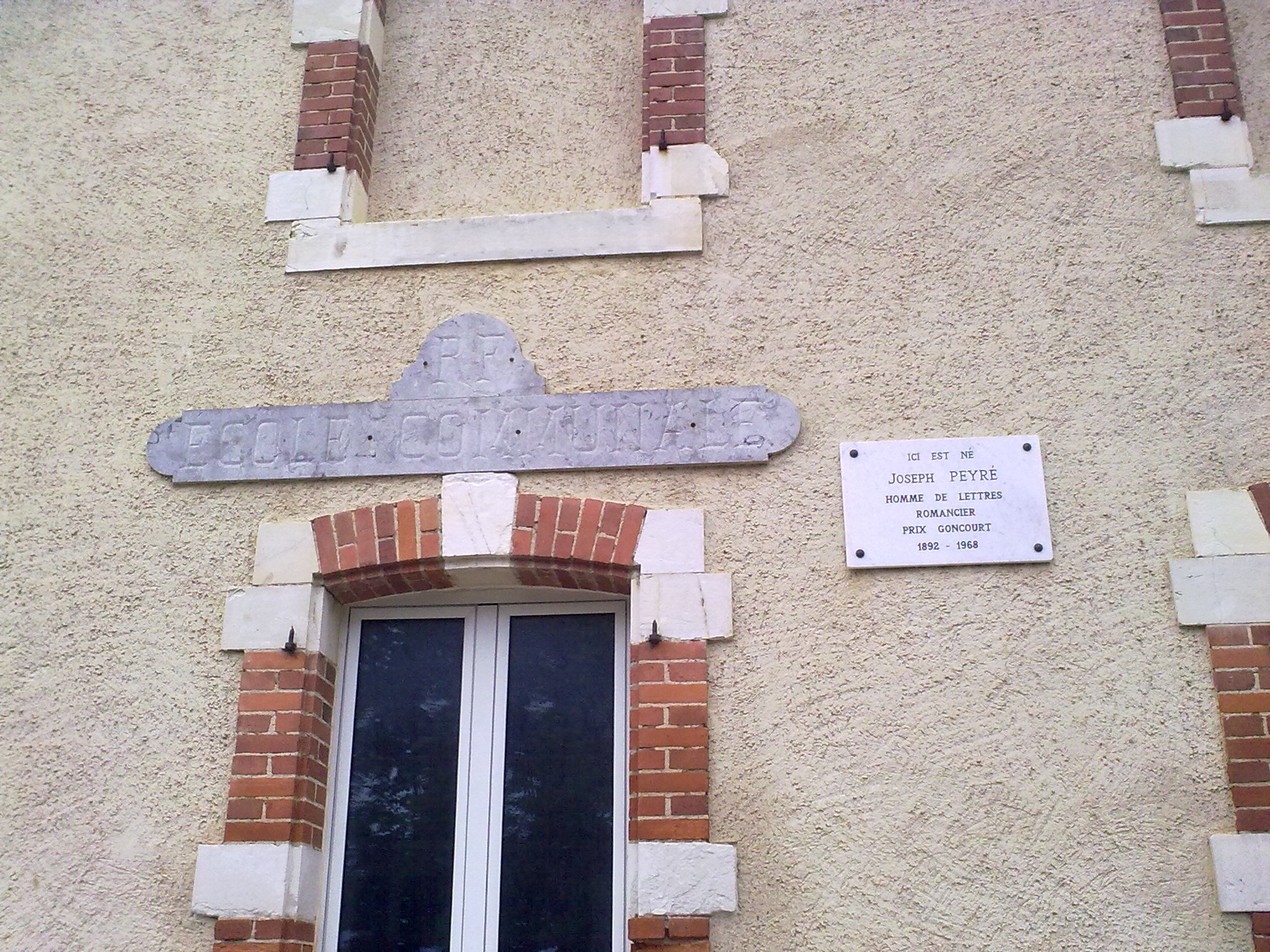
Detail on the school

=== Civil heritage ===
The commune has many sites that are registered as historical monuments:

- A Place at Poey (1567)
- A Farmhouse at Curon (1778)
- A Farmhouse at Moutha (1799)
- A Farmhouse at Parthonnaud (18th century)
- A Farmhouse at Mondain (1815)
- The Maison Lescher Farmhouse at Pessus (19th century)
- The Maison Lalanne Farmhouse at Lerp (19th century)
- The Maison Jouet Farmhouse at Maillet (19th century)
- The Maison Frouté Farmhouse at Dabadie (19th century)
- A Farmhouse at Estrémau (1859)
- A Farmhouse at Mourchette (1859)
- A Farmhouse at Laudique (1759)
- The Maison Moulié Farmhouse at Aveillé (1820)
- Houses and Farms (18th to 19th centuries)
- The Chateau Peyre (1895)
- A Chateau (destroyed) (17th century)
- A Fortified Building (12th century)
- A Camp
- A Camp at Pucheu (Prehistoric)

=== Religious heritage ===
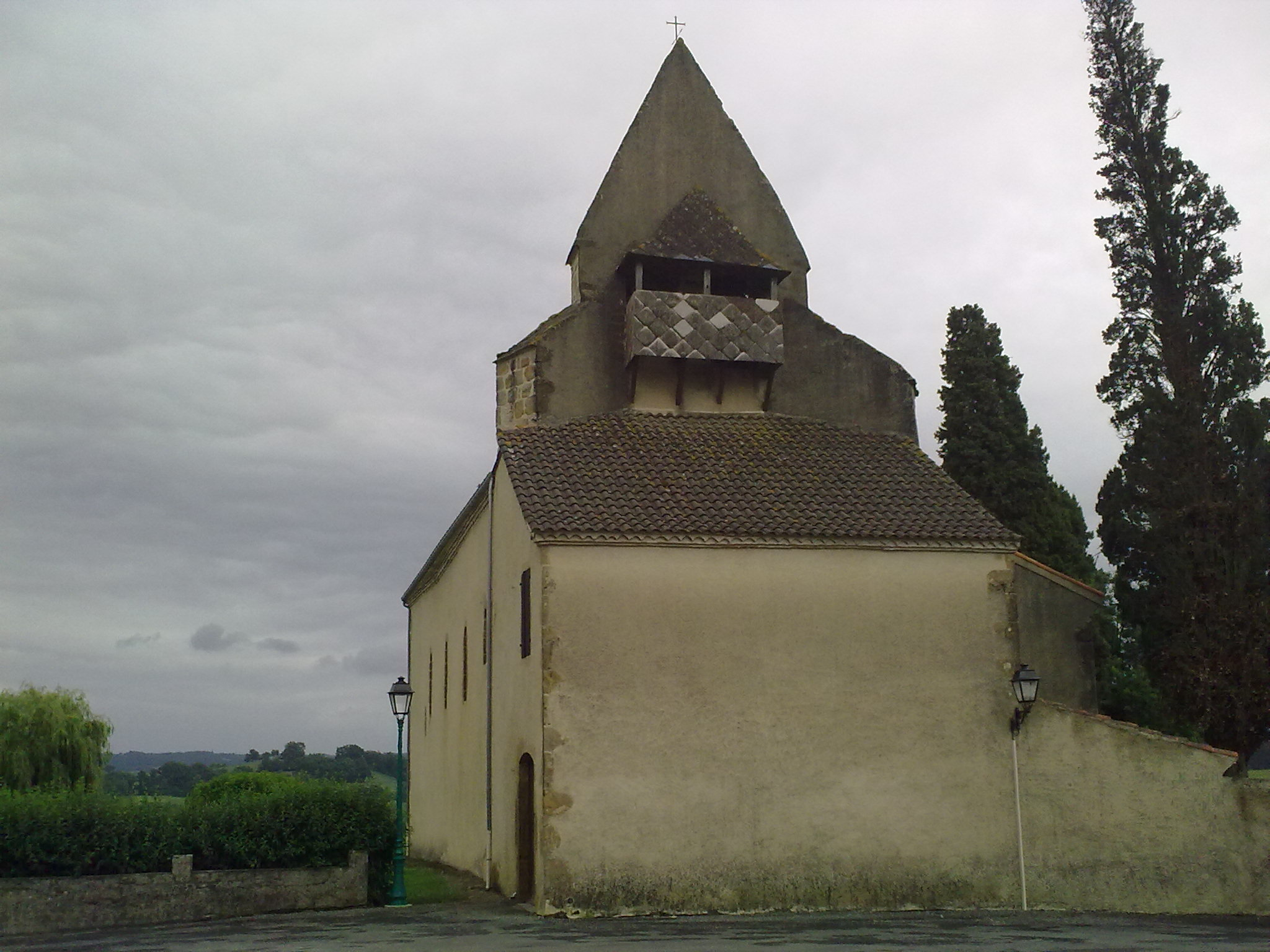
The Church of Saint John the Baptist

The commune has three religious sites that are registered as historical monuments:

- A Monumental Cross at Mondain (1888)
- A Presbytery called House of little red pots (1848)
- The Parish Church of Saint John the Baptist (11th century). The Church contains many items that are registered as historical objects:
  - A Statue: Virgin and Child (19th century)
  - An Altar, Retable, and Altar Cross (18th century)
  - 6 Altar Candlesticks (18th century)
  - A Lighting Arm (18th century)
  - A Painting: Christ on the Cross with Saint John, the Virgin, and Madeleine (18th century)
  - A Retable (18th century)
  - 6 Statuettes: Angel adoring, Saint Peter, Saint John, Saint Paul, and Saint Luke (18th century)
  - A Tabernacle (1725)
  - An Altar with Altar seating (18th century)
  - An Altar, Altar seating, Tabernacle, Retable, Lighting Arm, and 6 candlesticks (18th century)
  - A Monstrance (1868)
  - A Pill-box (18th century)
  - A Chalice with Paten (18th century)
  - 2 Paintings: Baptism of Christ and Preaching in the Desert (18th century)
  - A Sideboard (19th century)
  - A Baptismal font (18th century)

== Notable people linked to the commune ==
- Joseph Peyré, born in 1892 at Aydie and died in 1968 at Cannes, was a French writer. He won the Prix Goncourt in 1935 for his book Sang et Lumières (Blood and Lights). He evoked his native village under the pseudonym of Saint-Jean-des-Vignes.

== See also ==
- Communes of the Pyrénées-Atlantiques department
