= L'attaque du moulin =

1893 opera by Alfred Bruneau

L'attaque du moulin (The Attack on the Mill) is a drame lyrique (opera) in four acts by the French composer Alfred Bruneau. The libretto, by Louis Gallet with the collaboration of Émile Zola, is based on a short story by Zola (included in the collection Les soirées de Médan). Zola's story is about the Franco-Prussian War, but the setting of the opera was changed to the period of the French Revolution.

== Performance history ==
L'attaque du moulin was first performed on 23 November 1893 by the Opéra-Comique at the former Théâtre Lyrique (the present Théâtre de la Ville) on the Place du Châtelet in Paris. The mise-en-scène was by Léon Carvalho, the scenery by Marcel Jambon, and the costumes by Théophile Thomas. The original production was performed a total of 39 times.

The Gaîté Lyrique revived the opera on 16 December 1907, and the Opéra-Comique, on 25 March 1922 (14 performances). By 1917 the opera had been presented outside France in eleven different cities, including Brussels (27 January 1894), London (4 July 1894, at the Covent Garden theatre), Breslau (5 November 1805, in German), Geneva (11 December 1896), Milan (8 January 1898, at the Teatro Lirico, in Italian), The Hague (November 1903), Barcelona (7 January 1909), New York (8 February 1910), New Orleans (19 January 1911), Vienna (13 March 1914, at the Volksoper, in German), Birmingham (15 October 1915, in English), and again London (18 May 1917, at the Garrick Theatre, in English).

== Roles ==
Roles, voice types, premiere cast
Cast	Voice type	Premiere cast, 23 November 1893 Conductor: Jules Danbé
Françoise	soprano	Georgette Leblanc
Geneviève	soprano	Jeanne Laisné
Marceline	mezzo-soprano	Marie Delna
Dominique	tenor	Edmond Vergnet
Merlier	baritone	Max Bouvet
Sentinel	tenor	Edmond Clément
French captain	tenor	E. Thomas
Young man	baritone	Henri Artus
Enemy captain	baritone	Mondaud
Sergeant	baritone	Ragneau
Drummer	bass	Hippolyte Belhomme
