= Aydius =

- Commune
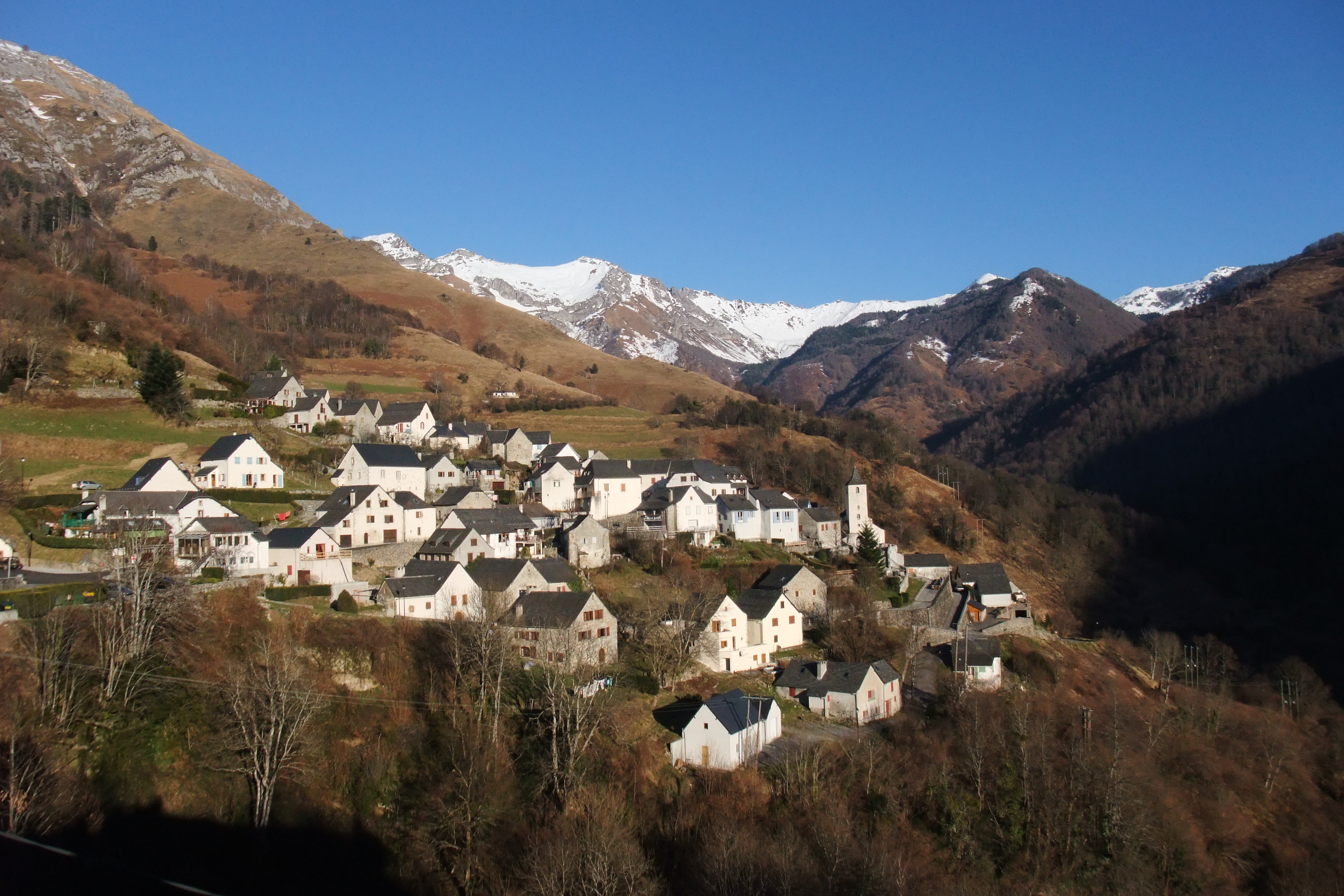
- A general view of Aydius
- Location of Aydius
- Location within France Location within Nouvelle-Aquitaine
- Coordinates: 43°00′07″N 0°32′24″W
- Country: France
- Region: Nouvelle-Aquitaine
- Department: Pyrénées-Atlantiques
- Arrondissement: Oloron-Sainte-Marie
- Canton: Oloron-Sainte-Marie-1
- Intercommunality: Haut Béarn

Government
  - Mayor (2020–2026): Bernard Choy
- Area^{1}: 34.72 km^{2} (13.41 sq mi)
- Highest elevation: 2,173 m (7,129 ft)
- Lowest elevation: 551 m (1,808 ft)
- Population (2023): 102
  - Density: 2.94/km^{2} (7.61/sq mi)
- Time zone: UTC+01:00 (CET)
  - Summer (DST): UTC+02:00 (CEST)
- INSEE/Postal code: 64085 /64490
- ^{1} French Land Register data, which excludes lakes, ponds, glaciers > 1 km^{2} (0.386 sq mi or 247 acres) and river estuaries.

Aydius (French pronunciation: [aidjus]; Occitan: Aidius) is a commune in the Pyrénées-Atlantiques department in the Nouvelle-Aquitaine region of south-western France.

== Geography ==
Aydius is located some 25 km south by south-east of Oloron-Sainte-Marie just east of Bedous. Access to the commune is by the D237 road from Bedous which goes to the village and terminates there. The commune is alpine in nature with extensive forests, rugged terrain and snow-capped mountains in the east.

The Gabarret river rises in the east of the commune and flows west gathering a large number of tributaries including the Ruisseau d'Arces, the Ruisseau du Saslars, the Gave de Béranfueil, the Gave de Bouren, the Ruisseau d'Ilhiec, the Ruisseau Sarité, the Ruisseau de Traillère, and the Ruisseau de Sahun (which forms part of the western border of the commune) before flowing west to join the Gave d'Aspe at Bedous.

=== Places and hamlets ===
- Anire
- L'Ardoisière
- Arès (barn)
- Arques (forest)
- Las Arretortes (Cap de)
- Les Arrouyes
- Baich (Rangole de)
- Barca
- Barrada
- Bat (barn)
- Bat (bridge)
- Bérangueil
- Bérie (bank)
- Bérouste (Serrot de)
- Bésur (cabin)
- Bouren
- Cachiquet (cabin)
- Calhabets (Pas de)
- Capdarest
- Capdevielle
- Capouret
- Carn de Haut (bank)
- Casaubon
- Les Catiasses (forest)
- Chechit
- Core de Cam
- Cot de Picars (alley)
- La Courade (Col de)
- Courdé
- Courrège Longue
- Cret Arrouy (Cap de)
- Escarrebirats (Pas d')
- Escourau (bank)
- Escut (forest)
- Guérègne
- Haut (Rangole de)
- Hourquet Roes (cabin)
- Les Ichantes
- Ichantes (forest)
- Illes (bank)
- Le Labay
- Lacazette
- Lacazotte
- Laresse
- Lartigalot
- Latoussé (Pènes des)
- Lespy
- Luc (barn)
- Manautton
- Mariebère (forest)
- Mirande
- Mousquaté (forest)
- Mousté (Col de)
- Pée Nouqué (ruins)
- Pouey
- La Poueye (Hosse de)
- Salaneuve (ruins)
- Les Salars
- Sarrelangue
- Sartiat (forest)
- Sézy (barn)
- Soumaous (Hosse de)
- Tousset
- l'Usclat (forest)

== Toponymy ==
The commune name in Gascon is Aidius. Michel Grosclaude said that the name probably comes from the same root as Aydie but its origin and meaning remain obscure.

The following table details the origins of the commune name and other names in the commune.

Name	Spelling	Date	Source	Page	Origin	Description
Aydius	Aydius	1385	Grosclaude			Village
	Lo temple de Sent Martin d'Aydius	1590	Raymond	18	Register of Aydius, BB, i, folio 3	
	Aydius	1750	Cassini			
Anire	Amire	1385	Raymond	6	Census	Farm
	Anire	1863	Raymond	6		
Le Col des Arques	Le Col des Arques	1863	Raymond	11		Pass from Aydius to Gère-Bélesten
Les Arrouyes	Les Arrouyes	1863	Raymond	13		Mountain
Barca	Barca	1863	Raymond	21		Mountain
Le Béranguet	Le Béranguet	1863	Raymond	28		Stream
Le Bouren	Le Bouren	1863	Raymond	35		Stream
Les Ichantes	Les Ichantes	1863	Raymond	81		Hamlet
L'Illecq	L'Illecq	1863	Raymond	82		Stream
Les Jaupins	Les Jaupins	1863	Raymond	85		Hamlet
Mariebère	Marie-Bère	1863	Raymond	108		Mountain
Bois de Mousquaté	Mousquété	1863	Raymond	119		Forest
Mousté	Mousté	1863	Raymond	120		Mountain on the border with Sarrance
Col de Pian	Le Col de Pian	1863	Raymond	135		Pass to Bedous
Col de Picas	Le Col de Picas	1863	Raymond	135		Mountain Pass
Salars	Les Salars	1863	Raymond	153		Hamlet

Sources:

- Grosclaude: Toponymic Dictionary of communes, Béarn, 2006 (in French)
- Raymond: Topographic Dictionary of the Department of Basses-Pyrenees, 1863, on the page numbers indicated in the table. (in French)
- Cassini: Cassini Map from 1750

Origins:

- Census: Census of Béarn

== History ==
A rock shelter dating from prehistory called Abri Gandon-Lassus has been discovered in the commune.

Paul Raymond noted on page 18 of his 1863 dictionary that the commune had a Lay Abbey, vassal of the Viscounts of Béarn and that in 1385 there were 30 fires and Aydius depended on the bailiwick of Aspe.

== Administration ==
List of Successive Mayors

From	To	Name
1995	2014	Bernard Bourguinat
2014	2026	Bernard Choy

=== Inter-communality ===
The commune is part of four inter-communal structures:

- the Communauté de communes du Haut Béarn;
- the Energy association of Pyrénées-Atlantiques;
- the inter-communal association for aid to education in the Vallée d'Aspe;
- the joint association for Haut-Béarn.

== Demography ==
Historical population

Year	Pop.	±% p.a.
1793	685	—
1821	891	+0.94%
1846	890	−0.00%
1872	715	−0.84%
1901	520	−1.09%
1926	283	−2.40%
1946	181	−2.21%
1954	137	−3.42%
1962	98	−4.10%

Year	Pop.	±% p.a.
1968	88	−1.78%
1975	94	+0.95%
1982	67	−4.72%
1990	74	+1.25%
1999	80	+0.87%
2007	102	+3.08%
2012	98	−0.80%
2017	114	+3.07%
2023	102	−1.84%

Source: EHESS and INSEE

== Economy ==
The economy of the commune is mainly focused towards agriculture and livestock. The commune is part of the Appellation d'origine contrôlée (AOC) zone of Ossau-iraty.

== Culture and heritage ==
=== Civil heritage ===
The commune has many sites that are registered as historical monuments:

- The Maison Guiraudé (1891)
- The Maison Pualet (16th century)
- The Maison Hontas (18th century)
- The Abri Gandon-Lassus Prehistoric Cave (Prehistory)
- The Maison Ichante (1807)
- The Maison Casaubon (18th century)

=== Religious heritage ===
- The Parish Church of Saint Martin (14th century) is registered as an historical monument.

=== Environmental heritage ===
Aydie contains a number of high mountains:

- The Sommet de Tachat (1,408 metres),
- The Sommet de Talabot (1,591 metres),
- The Sommet de Pétraube (1,606 metres,
- The Sommet de Houndarete (1,695 metres),
- The Soum de la Mousquère (1,778 metres,
- The Turon de la Goaita (1,805 metres,
- The Lousquette de Barca (1,870 metres,
- The Pic de Lariou (1,903 metres, and
- The Mailh Bassibe (1,973 metres.

== See also ==
- Communes of the Pyrénées-Atlantiques department

=== Bibliography ===
In his book L'ours et les brebis (The Bear and the sheep), Etienne Lamazou recounted his life as a transhumant shepherd from 1913 to 1969. Originally from Aydius, he never left except to take his cattle to their winter plain. He recounted the life of a shepherd as it still existed at the beginning of the 20th century. All the action takes place in and around Aydius and the book has many thousands of anecdotes sometimes soothing, sometimes moving, and often instructive.
