= Edmonde Charles-Roux =

French writer (1920–2016)

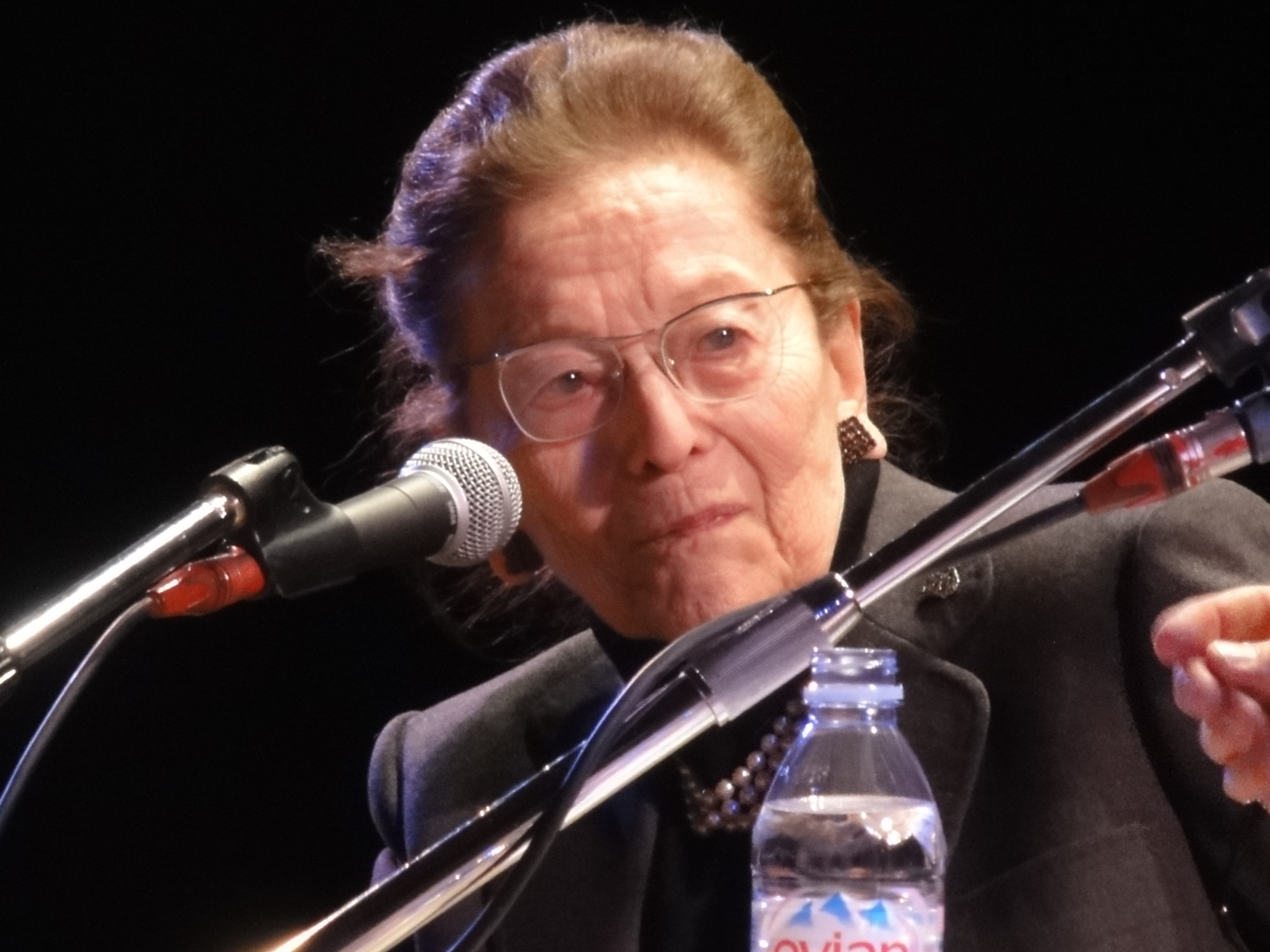
- Edmonde Charles-Roux in 2011
- Born: Marie-Charlotte Élisabeth Edmonde Charles-Roux; 17 April 1920; Neuilly-sur-Seine, Hauts-de-Seine, France
- Died: 20 January 2016 (aged 95); Marseille, Bouches-du-Rhône, France
- Writing career
- Notable awards: Prix Goncourt

Edmonde Charles-Roux (French pronunciation: [ɛdmɔ̃d ʃaʁl ʁu]; 17 April 1920 – 20 January 2016) was a French writer.

== Early life ==
Charles-Roux was born in 1920 at Neuilly-sur-Seine, the daughter of Francois Charles-Roux, the former French ambassador to Czechoslovakia, a member of the Institut de France and the last chairman of the Suez Canal Company. Her paternal grandfather, Jules Charles-Roux, was a businessman and politician.

== World War II ==
Charles-Roux was a volunteer nurse in World War II, at first in a French Foreign Legion unit, the 11th infantry regiment abroad. She was wounded at Verdun while bringing aid to a legionnaire.

Then she joined the Resistance, again as a nurse. After the landings in Provence, she was attached to the 5th Armored Division, where she performed as a nurse but also as a divisional social assistant. She also served in the 1st Foreign Cavalry Regiment (1er REC) and the Mechanized Regiment of the Foreign Legion (RMLE).

Decorated with the Croix de Guerre, she was made Chevalier de la Legion d'Honneur in 1945, and received the distinction of Vivandière d'honneur from the RMLE at the hands of Louis-Antoine Gaultier, corps commander.

== Journalist ==
In 1946, she joined the staff of a magazine being created, a women's weekly: Elle, where she spent two years. From 1948, she worked for the French edition of Vogue, becoming the magazine's editor-in-chief in 1954.

Reading Vogue democratized luxury while giving access to the most innovative artists of the time, whether such writers as Francois-Regis Bastide, Violette Leduc and Francois Nourissier or photographers such as Guy Bourdin, Henry Clarke or William Klein, or designers Christian Dior, Yves Saint Laurent and Emanuel Ungaro. By combining ready-to-wear and pop art, she connected fashion with any other form of creativity. She left Vogue Paris in 1966, as the result of a conflict for wanting to place a black woman on the cover of the magazine.

== Writer ==
Three months later, in 1966, she wrote Oublier Palerme and obtained the Prix Goncourt; the novel was adapted to film as The Palermo Connection in 1990 by Francesco Rosi.

The same year that she won the Goncourt she met Gaston Defferre, the mayor of Marseille, and they married in 1973.

Charles-Roux is also known for her photo stories on the lives of Defferre (L'Homme de Marseille, 2001), and of Coco Chanel (Chanel Time, 2004). She wrote the books of several of Roland Petit ballets, including Le Guépard and Nana.

She became a member of the Académie Goncourt in 1983, and president in 2002. In 2008, she was part of the Commission headed by Hugues Gall and charged by Christine Albanel, Minister of Culture, with recommending a candidate for the post of Director of the French Academy in Rome, Villa Medici.

In April 2010, she was awarded by French President Nicolas Sarkozy, with the rank of Commandeur de la Légion d'Honneur.

Edmonde Charles-Roux died on 20 January 2016, in Marseille, at the age of 95.

== Works ==
- Oublier Palerme, 1966, Grasset, novel, prix Goncourt 1966
- Elle, Adrienne, 1971, Grasset, novel
- L'Irrégulière ou mon itinéraire Chanel, 1974, Grasset, biography
- Stèle pour un bâtard, 1980, Grasset, novel
- 'Une enfance sicilienne, 1981, Grasset, novel
- Un désir d'Orient, biography of Isabelle Eberhardt, vol I, 1989 Grasset
- Nomade j'étais, biography of Isabelle Eberhardt, vol II, 1995 Grasset
- L'homme de Marseille, 2003, Grasset, photographic album
- Isabelle du désert, 2003 volume combining "Un désir d'Orient" and "Nomade j'étais" Grasset
- Le Temps Chanel, 1979, La Martinière / Grasset, photographic album

=== English translations ===
- To forget Palermo, Delacorte Press, 1968
- Chanel: her life, her world, and the woman behind the legend she herself created, Knopf, 1975, ISBN 978-0-394-47613-1
  - Chanel and her world: friends, fashion, and fame, Vendome Press, 2005, ISBN 978-0-86565-159-3
