= Yves Berger =

French writer (1931–2004)

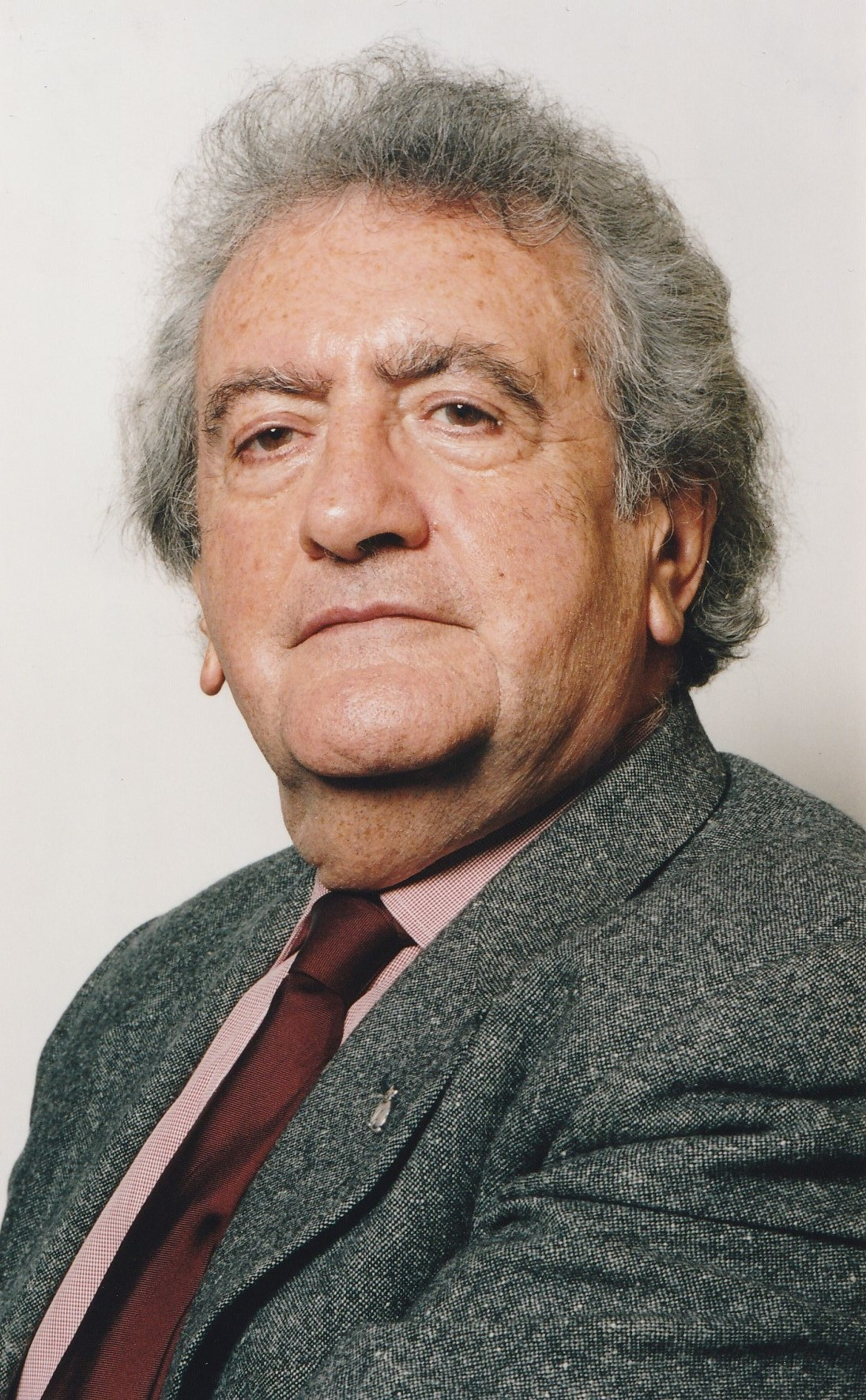
- Yves Berger at the 2001 International Geography Festival
- Born: 14 January 1931; Avignon, France
- Died: 16 November 2004 (aged 73); Paris, France
- Occupations: Writer, publisher

Yves Berger (14 January 1931 – 16 November 2004) was a French writer and editor. From 1960 to 2000, he was the literary director of Éditions Grasset, and published several novels in which he expressed his attachment to the United States.

== Biography ==
The son of a road transporter, Yves Berger affirmed that this detail has its importance because several of his works were filled with his love of the voyages. After high school at the Cité scolaire Frédéric-Mistral in Avignon, Yves Berger studied at Montpellier and in Paris. His childhood, rocked by Jack London and Fenimore Cooper, inspired him with this passion for the New World that never left him.

An english teacher by profession, he joined Grasset in 1960, becoming one of its pillars. He earned the nickname of "manitou of literary prizes" and the reputation of making or undoing the French literary prizes. He wrote his first novel, "The South," in 1962 about the State of Virginia before the American Civil War. Yves Berger also contributed to making French authors known such as Marie-Claire Blais and Antonine Maillet and prefaced the works of Native American authors such as Dee Brown, Vine Deloria and N. Scott Momaday whom he considered to be the greatest Amerindian writer of today.

In 1975, as Pierre Sabbagh's cultural adviser on the 2nd channel of french television, he convinces Jacqueline Baudrier in charge of the 1st channel to replace Marc Gilbert's Italics with Bernard Pivot's Ouvrez les guillemets talk show.

In 1996 he was appointed president of the "observatoire national de la langue française", an organism now deceased, then on 17 October 2003, vice-president of the Conseil supérieur de la langue française. He complained of the ravages of American English on the French language. In April 2004, he was elected by the Académie royale de langue et de littérature françaises de Belgique to occupy the seat of Robert Mallet, died 4 December 2002. He married in 1979, Marie-Claire Foulon.

== Works ==
=== Novels ===
- 1962: Le Sud, Prix Femina
- 1976: Le Fou d'Amérique
- 1987: Les Matins du Nouveau Monde
- 1990: La Pierre et la Saguaro, Prix de la langue française
- 1992: L'Attrapeur d'ombres, Prix Colette
- 1994: Immobile dans le courant du fleuve, Prix Médicis
- 1997: Le Monde après la pluie
- 2000: Santa Fé. The theme is that of lost youth. It is the story of the double passion of a man, Roque, in his sixties. The one he carries to Lea, who is 18 years old, and the one he devotes to the New World.

=== Essays ===
- 1958: Boris Pasternak
- Que peut la littérature ?, (collective)
- Dictionnaire amoureux de l'Amérique, Plon, series "Dictionnaire amoureux" (Prix Renaudot de l'essai in 2003)
