= Joseph Peyré =

French writer

Joseph Peyré (13 March 1892, in Aydie (Pyrénées-Atlantiques) – 26 December 1968, in Cannes) was a French writer. He won the Prix Goncourt in 1935 for Sang et Lumières.

== Life ==
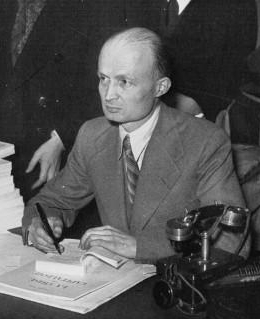
Joseph Peyré 1935

His father was a schoolteacher. He studied at Pau, Pyrénées-Atlantiques, at the Lycee Louis-Barthou, then Paris and Bordeaux (Doctor of Laws and Bachelor of Philosophy), he went into journalism.

Three themes animate the work of the "novelist of loneliness and the exaltation of man":

- The desert and travels through the sand, in his Sahara cycle, in particular White Squadron (Renaissance 1931), The Leader in the Star Silver (Carthage 1934), The Legend of goumier Said;
- Spain, seen in Sang et Lumières (1935) or Guadalquivir;
- The mountain, in the Matterhorn (1939) and Mount Everest (1942).

Joseph Peyre has also devoted several books to his native Béarn, The Pit and the house, my Bearn basque to the sea, and the Basque Country: Basque John (illustrated by Ramiro Arrue), The Bridge of spells.

== Posterity ==
His memory still lives, in Vic-Bihl taurine where tradition persists. The "trophy Joseph Peyre, presented annually by the Peña Garlin of taurine, rewards the triumph of novilladas summer.

Aydie, the birthplace of Peyre, is part of the canton of Garlin; College of Garlin named Joseph Peyre.

== Works ==
- Sur la terrasse, 1922
- Francis Carco, 1923
- Les Complices, 1928
- Xénia, préface by Joseph Kessel, 1930
- L'Escadron blanc, 1931
- Le Chef à l'étoile d'argent, 1933
- Sous l'étendard vert, 1934
- Coups durs, 1935
- Sang et Lumières, 1935
- L'Homme de choc, 1936
- Roc-Gibraltar, 1937
- De cape et d'épée, 1938
- Matterhorn, 1939
- Croix du sud, 1942
- Mont Everest, 1942
- Proie des ombres, 1943
- Romanesque Tanger, 1943
- Sahara éternel, 1944
- Un soldat chez les hommes, 1946
- Mallory et son dieu, 1947
- La Tour de l'or, 1947
- L'Étang Réal, 1949
- La Légende du goumier Saïd, 1950
- Inoa, 1951
- De mon Béarn à la mer basque, 1952
- Guadalquivir, 1952
- Jean le Basque, 1953
- La Passion selon Séville..., 1953
- Le Puits et la Maison , 1955
- Les Quatre Capitaines, 1956
- De sable et d'or, 1957
- Une fille de Saragosse, 1957
- Pays basque, Les Albums des Guides bleus, 1957
- Souvenirs d'un enfant, 1958
- Le Pont des sorts, 1959
- Le Pré aux ours, 1959
- Cheval piaffant - un Basque chez les Sioux, 1960
- Le Plan du soleil, 1960
- Les Lanciers de Jerez, 1961
- Les Remparts de Cadix, 1962
- L'Alcade de San Juan, 1963
- Feu et sang de juillet, 1964

== Sources ==
- Pierre Delay, Joseph Peyré 1892-1968 - L'homme et l'œuvre, J&D Éditions, Biarritz, 1992 (ISBN 2906483567)
- Joseph Peyré - L'Homme de ses livres, Collectif, Actes du colloque international de Pau 1992, Université de Pau et des Pays de l'Adour, J&D Éditions, Biarritz, 1994 (ISBN 2841270181)
