= Georges Blond =

French writer

Georges Blond (Jean-Marie Hoedick, 11 July 1906 – 16 March 1989), was a French writer who was born in Marseille and died in Paris. A prolific writer of mostly history but also other topics including fiction, Blond was also involved in far right political activity.

== Early years ==
Blond initially came to attention as a disciple of Alexis Carrel, and when reviewing Carrel's book L'Homme, cet inconnu for the journal Le petit dauphinois commented that Carrel was one of the few writers who would genuinely alter who people thought of themselves. He became noted as a sympathiser with fascism during the mid-1930s. His works regularly appeared in L'Insurgé, a literary journal for writers on the far right edited in the late 1930s by Thierry Maulnier.

== Second World War ==
A qualified naval engineer, Blond enlisted in the French Navy during the early stages of the Second World War but following the Battle of France was interned in the United Kingdom. Already strongly anti-British, Blond was embittered by his experiences and following repatriation he took up his pen against Britain, publishing the highly critical book L'Angleterre en guerre: Recit d'un marin francais in 1941. As a result of works like this Blond was one of only a handful of French political writers adjudged acceptable by Nazi Germany and as a result his books continued to be in print under the Vichy government.

He became a writer for the collaborationist journal Je suis partout, although Blond was associated with a "soft" tendency led by the likes of Robert Brasillach and Henri Poulain towards the end of the Second World War. In contrast to the "hard" tendency of Pierre-Antoine Cousteau and Lucien Rebatet, Blond's group wanted to de-emphasise associations with Nazism and instead concentrate on literature, sensing that Nazi defeat was imminent.

== Post-war activity ==
His link to collaboration damaged Blond's reputation in the initial post-war period and his name appeared on a blacklist published by the Comite National d'Ecrivains in September 1945. He suffered dégradation nationale in 1949 for his involvement in collaboration. Nonetheless, Blond soon became a widely read and published author again with works such as his 1981 book Histoire de la Légion étrangère, the story of the French Foreign Legion, receiving widespread attention and praise.

In 1965 Blond was one of a number of far right figures to lend his name to a petition that appeared in La Dépêche du Midi, a newspaper controlled by René Bousquet, in support of François Mitterrand at a time when the avowedly left-wing politician maintained links to the Republican Party of Liberty, a group descended from Croix-de-Feu.

== Works ==
Georges Blond was an extremely prolific writer. This list is not exhaustive and is not classified in a chronological order of publication (release dates are tentative).

- History
  - L'Épopée silencieuse
  - Le Survivant du Pacifique - Histoire du Porte-avions "Enterprise"
  - Convois vers l'URSS
  - Le Débarquement
  - L'Agonie de l'Allemagne
  - Les Princes du ciel
  - La Grande Aventure des Migrateurs
  - La Grande Aventure des Éléphants
  - L'Homme, ce Pèlerin
  - J'ai vu vivre l'Amérique
  - L'Amiral Togo (samouraï de la mer)
  - Histoire pittoresque de notre alimentation (with Germaine Blond)
  - La Légion étrangère
  - La Marne
  - La Grande Aventure des Baleines
  - La Seconde Guerre mondiale (3 volumes)
  - Histoire de la flibuste
  - Rien n'a pu les abattre
  - Pétain : Biographie
  - La Grande Armée du Drapeau noir
  - Verdun (L'Enfer) (Prix Richelieu)
  - L'Angleterre en guerre
  - Les Grandes Aventures des Océans ( 2 volumes)
  - La Grande Aventure de l'Océan Indien
  - Les Naufragés de Paris
  - La Beauté et la Gloire : Nelson et Emma Hamilton
  - Les Enragés de Dieu
  - L'Aventure du langage
  - Pauline Bonaparte
  - Moi Laffite, dernier roi des flibustiers
  - La Grande Armée, 1804-1815
  - Méditerranée (où se joue notre destin)
  - Attaquez le Tirpitz
  - La fin du Graf Spee
  - Les Cent-Jours
- Novels
  - L'amour n'est qu'un plaisir
  - Journal d'un imprudent
  - Le jour se lève à l'ouest
  - L'île des phoques
- Novellas
  - La beauté morte
  - Mary Marner
  - L'Ile de la déesse
- Photographic Albums
  - D'Arromanches à Berlin
  - La Vie surprenante des phoques
  - La Vallée des Castors
