= Henry Céard =

French writer and playwright (1851–1924)

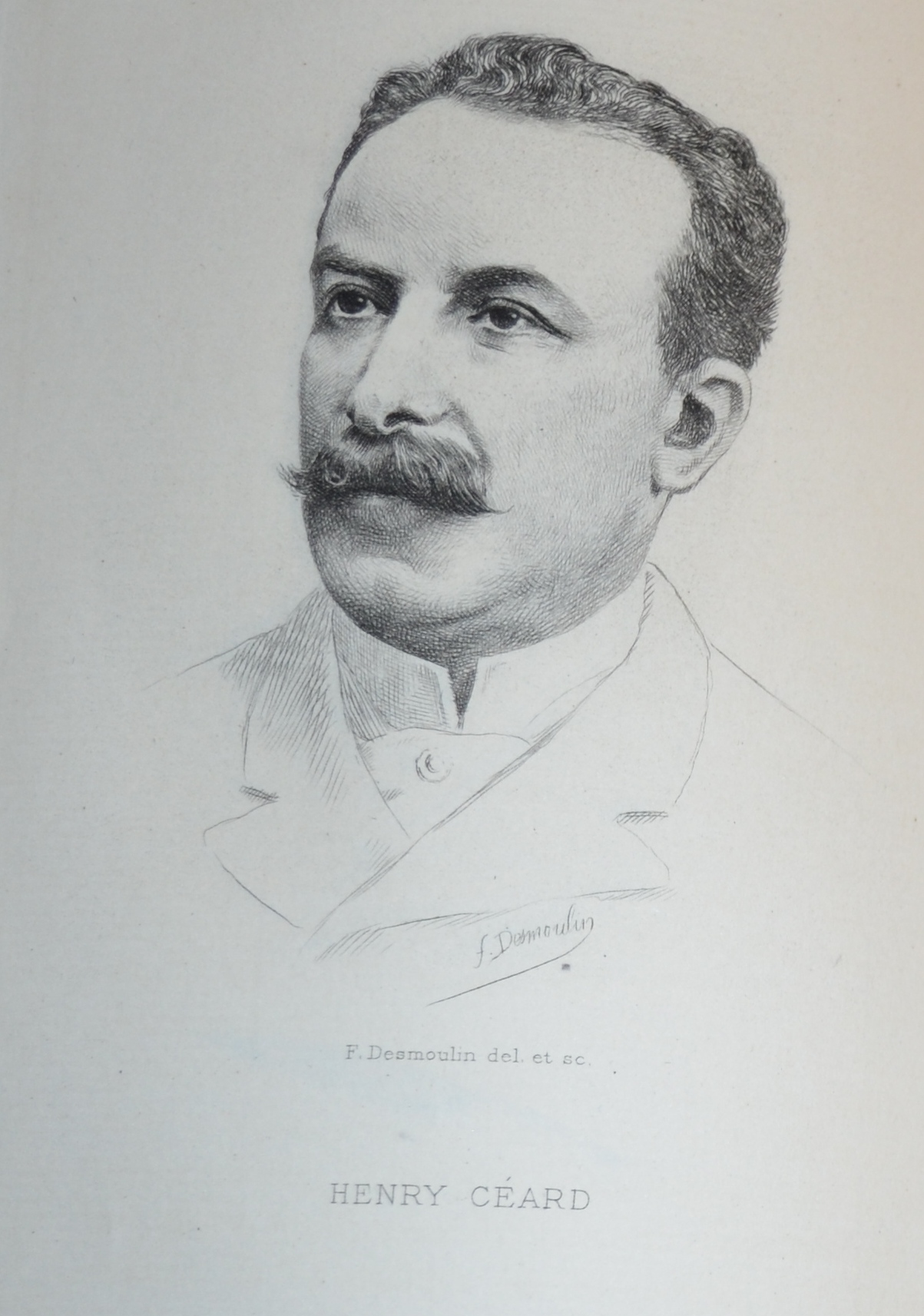

Henry Céard (19 November 1851 – 16 August 1924) was a French novelist, poet, playwright and literary critic. A writer in the school of naturalism, he was a close friend of Emile Zola before the Dreyfus affair caused them to drift apart.

Céard was born in Bercy in a middle-class family. He was educated in both science and humanities. He worked in the government was for a while in the ministry of war. He then worked in the cabinet and as a deputy director of the library of Paris at Hotel Carnavalet. He was keenly interested in literature and joined a group of writers including Emile Zola and Guy de Maupassant. He took an interest in the social realities of the period of rapid industrialization and urbanization and wrote a few novels and collections of short pieces including Soirées de Médan and La Saignée. He took an interest in the problems of the working class and on poverty and social inequalities. In 1918 he was elected to the Académie Goncourt. During his lifetime he was not given much attention but after his death his works, including unpublished manuscripts, gained fresh attention.

Céard died at his home on rue Chasseloup-Laubat in Paris and was buried in Bercy.
