= André Savignon =

French author

André Savignon (1 January 1878 – 10 January 1947) was a French author.

== Life ==
Savignon was born to (Eugène) Michel Savignon and (Louise) Isabelle Varanguien de Villepin in Tarbes, Hautes-Pyrénées. He married Marie-Josèphe Monzelun on 29 July 1902 in Paris. Between 1908 and 1914 he made numerous trips to England, particularly to Plymouth.

After World War I, Savignon moved to St Malo (Ille et Vilaine, France). On 27 September 1919 he married Berthe Desgranges at Ambérac (Charentes, France).

Savignon left no descendants from either of his marriages.

== Career ==
A writer, Savignon won the Prix Goncourt in 1912 with his novel Les filles de la pluie, describing the daily life in Ouessant Island. His other books include:

- Une femme dans chaque port;
- Le secret des eaux;
- La tristesse d'Elsie;
- La dame de la Ste Alice;
- Tous les trois;
- St Malo nid de corsaires.

Savignon was a Chevalier de la Légion d'Honneur.

Working as a reporter for various newspapers, Savignon continued to visit England regularly. He was in London when World War II broke out in 1939, was in Plymouth during the Blitz and then remained in London until his death at the age of 69, at The French Hospital, from pneumonia on 10 January 1947. He is buried in the Rosais cemetery on banks of the La Rance river in St Servan sur Mer (Ille et Vilaine, France).
