= François Nourissier =

French journalist and writer

François Nourissier (French pronunciation: [fʁɑ̃swa nuʁisje]; Paris, 18 May 1927–Paris, 15 February 2011) was a French journalist and writer.

Nourissier was the secretary-general of Éditions Denoël (1952–1955), editor of the review La Parisienne (1955–1958), and an adviser with the Éditions Grasset Paris publishing house (1958–1996).

In 1970, he won the Prix Femina for his book La crève. Several of his novels have been made into films and in 1973 he was a member of the Jury at the Cannes Film Festival.

François Nourissier was elected to the Académie Goncourt in 1977. He served as the literary organization's Secretary-General in 1983 and was its president from 1996 to 2002.

In 2002, he was awarded the Prix mondial Cino Del Duca.

On 15 February 2011 Francois Nourissier died at Sainte-Perine Hospital in Paris from the complications of Parkinson's disease.

== Major works ==
- 1951 : L'Eau Grise
- 1956 : Les Orphelins d'Auteuil, Les Chiens à fouetter
- 1957 : Le Corps de Diane
- 1958 : Bleu comme la nuit
- 1964 : Un petit bourgeois
- 1965 : Une histoire française - Grand Prix du roman de l'Académie française
- 1970 : La crève (Prix Femina)
- 1973 : Allemande
- 1981 : L'Empire des nuages
- 1985 : La Fête des pères
- 1992 : Le Gardien des ruines
- 1997 : Le Bar de l'escadrille
- 2001 : À défaut de génie
- 2003 : Le prince des berlingots
- 2008 : Eau-de-feu
