= Boris Schreiber =

French writer

- Born: 28 May 1923; Berlin, Germany
- Died: 11 February 2008 (aged 84); Neuilly-sur-Seine, France
- Occupation: Writer
- Writing career
- Language: His works are written in the French language
- Notable works: La Rencontre des absents (1963); La Traversée du dimanche (1987); Un silence d'environ une demi-heure (1996)
- Notable awards: Prix Combat (1963); Prix Sainte-Beuve (1987); Prix Renaudot (1996)
- Website: www.borisschreiber.fr

Boris Schreiber (28 May 1923 – 11 February 2008) was a French writer.

== Biography ==
Boris Schreiber was born on 28 May 1923 in Berlin, where his parents, Wladimir Schreiber and Eugénie Markowitch, lived as refugees of the Russian Revolution. His father worked for the German-Russian joint stock transport company (Derutra) and later for a German import-export company. The family enjoyed a life of prosperity. After his father lost his job six years later, the Schreibers left Berlin, moving to Antwerp, where they lived in abject poverty. Eugénie's family in Riga subsequently took them in. In 1930, they moved to Paris, where Boris Schreiber was sent to several schools, having already been taught French by his aunt in Riga.

In 1937, he began to write a diary and tried to establish contact with various writers (Romain Rolland, Georges Duhamel, Francis Carco)). He also kept abreast of the literary world and thus discovered the works of other Jewish immigrant writers from the East, in particular those of Irène Némirovsky and Jean Malaquais. In 1938 he visited André Gide and read excerpts from his diary and a short story to him.

During the German occupation, his family settled in Marseille. At this time, Boris Schreiber visited Gide in Cabris, where he also met Roger Martin du Gard, Henri Thomas and Jean Schlumberger. After having completed his secondary school education, he enrolled at the Faculty of Law at Aix-Marseille University (1942–1943). Although he was registered with the Vichy administration as a stateless Russian, he escaped persecution under anti-Jewish laws because his religion was specified as "orthodox". To avoid compulsory work service (STO), he worked for the German Todt Organisation (OT) in 1944. Prior to the liberation of Marseilles, he joined the FFI resistance network and worked for the newspaper Rouge Midi. He subsequently joined his parents in Paris and met Simone there soon after; they married several years later. In 1947, he received French citizenship and enrolled at the Sorbonne University to study literary studies and Russian.

At this time, he started to write his first novel, Le Droit d'asile – a narrative about the war in Marseilles – published in 1957. Boris Schreiber taught for several years. Thanks to financial support from his parents, however, he was later able to dedicate himself entirely to writing. His father had set up a successful oil business. Schreiber was awarded the Prix Combat for La Rencontre des absents (1963). He published a dozen novels with several publishers, which received recognition but failed to reach a broad public. His novel La Traversée du dimanche (1987) was awarded the Prix Sainte-Beuve.

In 1968, he left Simone to live with Lucienne. His novel Le Cratère published in 1975 is about this separation. Some years after the death of his father (1976), he left Lucienne and divorced Simone in order to marry Arria (1982). He travelled abroad and lived in Long Island (NY) in the United States for a period of time. After the death of his mother (1985), he began to write autobiographical works and was awarded the Prix Renaudot for Un silence d'environ une demi-heure in 1996. His last work, Faux titre, a collection of short stories, was published some weeks before his death.

== The man and his work ==
Boris Schreiber began to write a diary at the age of 13 and continued to do so for the rest of his life. He portrayed himself as follows: "a foreigner before the war, a Jew during the war and a writer in exile after the war": the era, the man and his work – these were the three components of his misery. His literary work moved between two poles. On the one hand, he wrote novels: his first novel was Le Droit d'asile in 1957 and his last was Faux titre in 2008. On the other hand, he wrote autobiographical works, which were unique because he rejected the first person singular: Le Lait de la nuit (1989), Le Tournesol déchiré (1991), Un silence d'environ une demi-heure (1996), Hors-les-murs (1998). These two poles flowed into one another; life and fiction fed into each other through this matrix, deep and unvoiced, that he chose to use, drawing on his diary (not published) and processing his memories about the wartime events and his feelings as a Jewish youth, which he had not been able to put to paper during the war.

Schreiber lived for writing; he constantly battled with his father, who disapproved of his vocation, and with publishers, whose rejections he found humiliating. Nevertheless, his father gave him the means that enabled him to dedicate his life to writing and his mother supported him unconditionally. He kept a distance from the literary world, where he had only a few friends (Alain Bosquet, Pierre Drachline...). Although he ignored the literary trends of the era, similarities can be found between his works and the literary works of several of his contemporaries (Jean Malaquais, Romain Gary, Jean Cayrol...), in particular the themes of the works (war, Judaism,) and certain innovations related to the form of the works (complex narrative systems, unreliable narrators...).

In his novels and autobiographical works, Schreiber, aware of his value, liked to portray himself as the accursed writer, painting a picture of himself as a megalomaniac and misanthropist only interested in his own works and the status that they gave him. This image of him, in some cases even grotesque, made critics and readers turn their backs on his works. He was a man who should have been wiped out by history and who had spent a year working for the people who were exterminating his people. For him there was only one way of surviving: literature and writing – writing that is haunted by memories of the war, and populated by characters that are denied an identity. His work was therefore the very basis of his own survival but also consists of narratives about survival, as demonstrated by the first sentence of his first novel Le Droit d'asile (1957): "The day of my survival was a terrible day". It was written after a period of silence of approximately five years, a time during which he had been forced to stay silent as a Jewish and stateless youth under German occupation. Schreiber's works are some of the most forceful of those written by people who tried to put the darkest hours of the 20th century onto paper.

== Works ==
- Le Droit d'asile, Denoël, Paris 1957.
- Les Heures qui restent, Denoël, Paris, 1958.
- La Rencontre des absents, Calmann-Lévy, Paris, 1962. Prix Combat.
- L'Évangile selon Van Horn, Belfond, Paris, 1972.
- Les Premiers jours de Pompéi, Belfond, Paris, 1973.
- L'Oiseau des profondeurs, Luneau Ascot, Paris, 1987. Repris sous le titre de La traversée du dimanche, Fleuve noir, Paris, 1998. Prix Sainte-Beuve.
- Le Cratère, Grasset, Paris, 1975.
- Les Souterrains du soleil, Grasset, Paris, 1977.
- L'Organeau, Jean-Jacques Pauvert, Paris, 1982.
- La Descente au berceau, Luneau Ascot, 1984.
- Le Lait de la nuit, F. Bourin-Julliard, Paris, 1989 (Gallimard, « Folio », Paris, 1991).
- Le Tournesol déchiré, F. Bourin-Julliard, Paris, 1991 (Gallimard, « Folio », Paris, 1993).
- Un silence d'environ une demi-heure, Le Cherche-Midi, Paris, 1996 (Gallimard, « Folio », Paris, 1998). Prix Renaudot.
- Hors-les-murs, Le Cherche Midi, Paris, 1998 (Gallimard, « Folio », Paris, 2000).
- L'Excavatrice, Le Cherche Midi, Paris, 2000 (Gallimard, « Folio », Paris, 2001).
- La Douceur du sang, Le Cherche Midi, Paris, 2003 (Gallimard, « Folio », Paris, 2004).
- La Mille et unième nuit, Sables éditions, Pin-Balma, 2005.
- Faux titre, Le Cherche Midi, Paris, 2008.

== Bibliography ==
- Cazenobe, Colette, « La Passion juive selon Boris Schreiber », Travaux de littérature, n° XIII, 2000, p. 338-60.
- Clancier, Anne, « Les Blessures du narcissisme : les œuvres autobiographiques de Boris Schreiber », Écriture de soi et narcissisme, Jean-François Chiantaretto ed., Erès, 2002, p. 61-65.
- Pernot, Denis, « Les Heures qui restent de Boris Schreiber: ratage et oubli », in Romans exhumés (1910–1960). Contribution à l'histoire littéraire du vingtième siècle, EUD, 2014. ISBN 978-2-36441-082-4
- Boris Schreiber: une oeuvre dans les tourments du siècle, Denis Pernot ed., Editions Universitaires de Dijon, 2013. ISBN 978-2-36441-052-7
- Labouret, Denis, Littérature française du XXe siècle, Chap. 3, Editions Armand Colin, Paris, 2013.ISBN 978-2-200-27601-0
- Drachline, Pierre, Borinka, Le Cherche Midi, Paris, 2010.
