= Capet (surname) =

Capet is a surname that may refer to:

- André Capet (1939–2000), French politician
- Laurent Capet (born 1972), French volleyball player
- Lucien Capet (1873–1928), French violinist, pedagogue and composer
- Marie-Gabrielle Capet (1761–1818), French Neoclassical painter
- Yann Capet (born 1975), French politician

== Given but not confirmed ==
- Louis XVI of France – surname Capet was given to the deposed King during the revolution, but it is unconfirmed if he and his family actually accepted it and used it

== See also ==
- House of Capet
