= Forests of the Night =

Forests of the Night may refer to:

- The Forests of the Night, a 1947 novel by Jean-Louis Curtis
- Forests of the Night (Cleary novel), a 1963 novel by Jon Cleary
- Forests of the Night, a 1993 science fiction novel by S. Andrew Swann
- In the Forests of the Night, a 1999 novel by Amelia Atwater-Rhodes
- "In the Forest of the Night", a 2014 episode of the TV series Doctor Who
