= Pont-à-Mousson =

- Commune
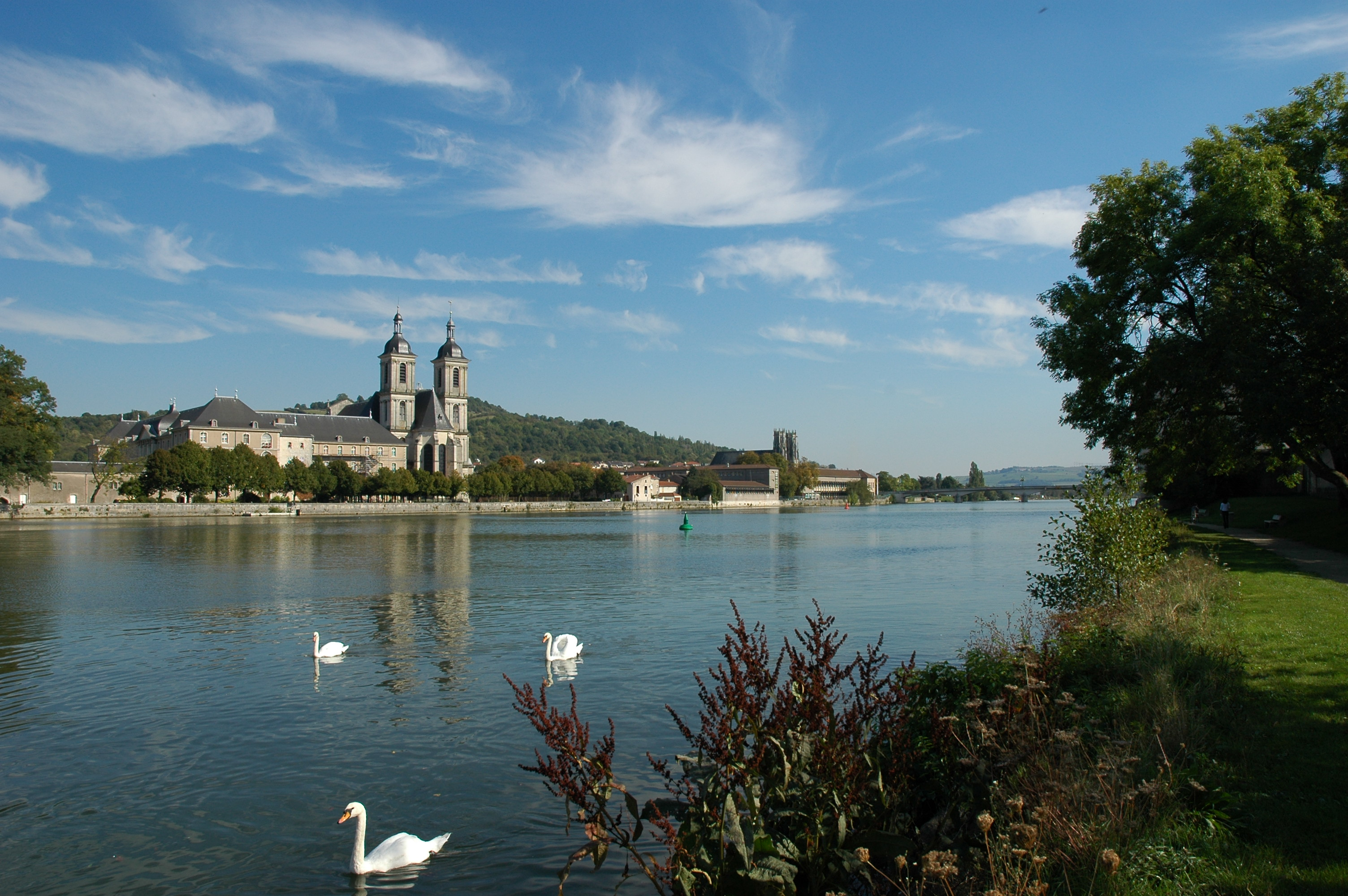
- The Moselle and the Premonstratensian abbey in Pont-à-Mousson.

- Coat of arms
- Location of Pont-à-Mousson
- Location within France Location within Grand Est
- Coordinates: 48°54′19″N 6°03′17″E
- Country: France
- Region: Grand Est
- Department: Meurthe-et-Moselle
- Arrondissement: Nancy
- Canton: Pont-à-Mousson
- Intercommunality: CC Bassin de Pont-à-Mousson

Government
  - Mayor (2020–2026): Henry Lemoine
- Area^{1}: 21.6 km^{2} (8.3 sq mi)
  - Urban: 73.3 km^{2} (28.3 sq mi)
- Elevation: 183 m (600 ft)
- Highest elevation: 382 m (1,253 ft)
- Lowest elevation: 172 m (564 ft)
- Population (2023): 14,190
  - Density: 657/km^{2} (1,700/sq mi)
  - Urban (2022): 23,793
  - Urban density: 325/km^{2} (841/sq mi)
- Time zone: UTC+01:00 (CET)
  - Summer (DST): UTC+02:00 (CEST)
- INSEE/Postal code: 54431 /54700
- Website: www.ville-pont-a-mousson.fr
- ^{1} French Land Register data, which excludes lakes, ponds, glaciers > 1 km^{2} (0.386 sq mi or 247 acres) and river estuaries.

Pont-à-Mousson (French pronunciation: [pɔ̃.t‿a.musɔ̃]) is a commune in the Meurthe-et-Moselle department in north-eastern France. Its inhabitants are known as Mussipontains in French. It is an industrial town (mainly steel industry), situated on the river Moselle. Pont-à-Mousson has several historical monuments, including the 18th-century Premonstratensian abbey.

== Demographics ==
The urban area of Pont-à-Mousson has a population of about 24,000.

Historical population

Year	Pop.	±% p.a.
1793	6,428	—
1800	6,738	+0.68%
1806	7,000	+0.64%
1821	7,005	+0.00%
1831	7,039	+0.05%
1836	7,261	+0.62%
1841	7,131	−0.36%
1846	7,140	+0.03%
1851	7,079	−0.17%
1856	7,709	+1.72%
1861	8,115	+1.03%
1872	8,211	+0.11%
1876	10,970	+7.51%
1881	11,293	+0.58%
1886	11,585	+0.51%
1891	11,595	+0.02%
1896	12,701	+1.84%
1901	12,847	+0.23%

Year	Pop.	±% p.a.
1906	13,543	+1.06%
1911	14,009	+0.68%
1921	8,891	−4.44%
1926	11,726	+5.69%
1931	12,646	+1.52%
1936	11,343	−2.15%
1946	10,239	−1.02%
1954	11,416	+1.37%
1962	12,802	+1.44%
1968	13,406	+0.77%
1975	14,830	+1.45%
1982	14,942	+0.11%
1990	14,645	−0.25%
1999	14,592	−0.04%
2007	14,065	−0.46%
2012	15,053	+1.37%
2017	14,228	−1.12%
2023	14,190	−0.04%

Source: EHESS and Insee

== History ==
=== Early Modern ===
In 1572 Cardinal Charles of Lorraine established a Jesuit university at Pont-à-Mousson. With the Protestant Revolution building in the German-speaking lands, still part of the Holy Roman Empire, directly to the east, and the Duchy of Lorraine vulnerable to pressure from an increasingly assertive French state directly to the west, the Duchy participated in the wars of religion on the side of the Counter-Reformation. The Tridentine strategy promulgated by the Holy See involved the creation of a "Roman Catholic backbone" (sometimes termed the Lotharingian axis from the territories, including Lorraine, between France and the Habsburg Empire).

During the seventeenth century the university of Pont-à-Mousson grew rapidly until there were about 2,000 students. There were four faculties covering theology, the arts, law and medicine. Students were drawn from across western and central Europe. Over time a rivalry grew up between students in the St Martin district, located on the right-bank of the river Moselle and dominated by Jesuits, and the left-bank students based in the St Laurent quarter and considered the rowdier of the two student tribes. Rivalry peaked with the violent "printers' battles" when the rival factions were known respectively as the "Ponti Mussoni" and the "Mussiponti". The "Mussiponti" won, and in the region the inhabitants of the town became known thereafter as "Mussipontains/Mussipontines".

=== 18th and 19th centuries ===
The Duchy of Lorraine became French following the death in 1766 of Duke Stanisław Leszczyński, and in 1769 Louis XV had the Jesuit Academy transferred to Nancy. The only notable educational establishment remaining at Pont-à-Mousson was a military training school.

The town continued to flourish as a centre of the visual arts, however, rivalling Épinal to the south in this respect. A papier-mâché factory also contributed to the cultural development of Pont-à-Mousson.

It was the regional capital between 1790 and 1795, but underwent extensive destruction in the ensuing wars, and was subject to foreign occupation in 1814 and 1815. During the Franco-Prussian War it experienced severe street fighting.

==== Pont-à-Mousson Company ====
The Pont-à-Mousson Company (PAM) was created in 1856 by a group of Lorraine businessmen to operate the Marbache iron mine and to use the ore to manufacture cast iron. Xavier Rogé was the manager. In 1862 the enterprise was liquidated due to lack of sufficient capital to cover the high investment expenses. Rogé managed to raise capital in the Saarland and restart the business, selling most of its production to forges in the Ardennes and Champagne.

In 1866, Rogé visited England and became aware of the new and promising market for cast-iron water pipes. He focused the company on pipe production, and found a ready market when cities began to make large investment in water supply after 1871. He adopted the English method of casting pipes in vertical rather than horizontal moulds. He was succeeded by Camille Cavallier, who transformed the moderately sized cast iron pipe manufacturer into a giant, always concentrating on making pipes. Annual cast iron production rose from 80,000 to 183,000 tons between 1900 and 1913.

The company, later known as Saint-Gobain PAM is still producing ductile cast iron pipes and fittings for drinking water, irrigation and sewage applications; its logo still reflects the multi-arched bridge over the river. The plant of Pont-à-Mousson, having its 160th anniversary in 2016, is the largest employer in the city, with an average 1000 employees spread among two plants, a research center and the headquarters of the company.

=== 20th century ===
Strategically positioned at an important river crossing, Pont-à-Mousson and the surrounding region saw terrible fighting during the twentieth century wars between France and Germany. In the World War I fighting at Bois-le-Prêtre, Croix des Carmes, and Grand-Couronné are names that recall savage fighting between French and German soldiers. The town suffered further destruction in 1944, before being liberated by the U.S. Third Army under the command of Lieutenant General George S. Patton, supported by an active local resistance movement.

In 1921 the President personally presented the town with the Croix de guerre, and shortly after this Désiré Ferry, the local deputy, was awarded the Légion d'honneur. After World War II, Pont-à-Mousson was again honoured, this time with the Croix de Guerre.

== People ==
Pont-à-Mousson was the birthplace of:

- Guarinus of Sitten (1065–1150), saint and bishop of Sion
- Margaret of Anjou (1430–1482) married to Henry VI of England
- John Barclay (1582—1621), Scottish satirist and Latin poet
- Geraud Duroc (1772–1813), French general
- Louis Camille Maillard (1878–1936), French physician and chemist
- Émile Amann (1880–1948), French historian of religion
- Pierre Lallement (1843–1891), inventor of the modern bicycle
- Georges Navel (1904–1993), French writer, first winner of the Prix Sainte-Beuve in 1946
- Jean Kuntzmann (1912–1992), mathematician

== See also ==
- Communes of the Meurthe-et-Moselle department

== Sources ==
- Gaston-Breton, Tristan (8 August 2005), "Camille Cavallier", Les Echos, Ces innovateurs ou ces aventuriers qui ont transforme l'economie
- Vuillemin, Jean (October 2002), "Camille Cavallier", Arts et Métiers Magazine (in French), Fondation des Arts et Métiers, archived from the original on 29 August 2017
