= 2021 English Channel disaster =

Boat capsizing during a migrant crossing

- Part of the English Channel migrant crossings (2018–present)
- 2021 English Channel disaster (English Channel)
- Date: 24 November 2021
- Location: near Calais, France; 51.1574963°N 1.8491113°E
- Cause: Vessel capsized
- Deaths: 31
- Injuries: 2
- Missing: 4

On 24 November 2021, an inflatable dinghy carrying migrants from France to the United Kingdom capsized in the English Channel causing the deaths of 28 of the 30 people on board. It is believed to be the deadliest incident in the English Channel since the International Organization for Migration began collecting data in 2014.

== Background ==
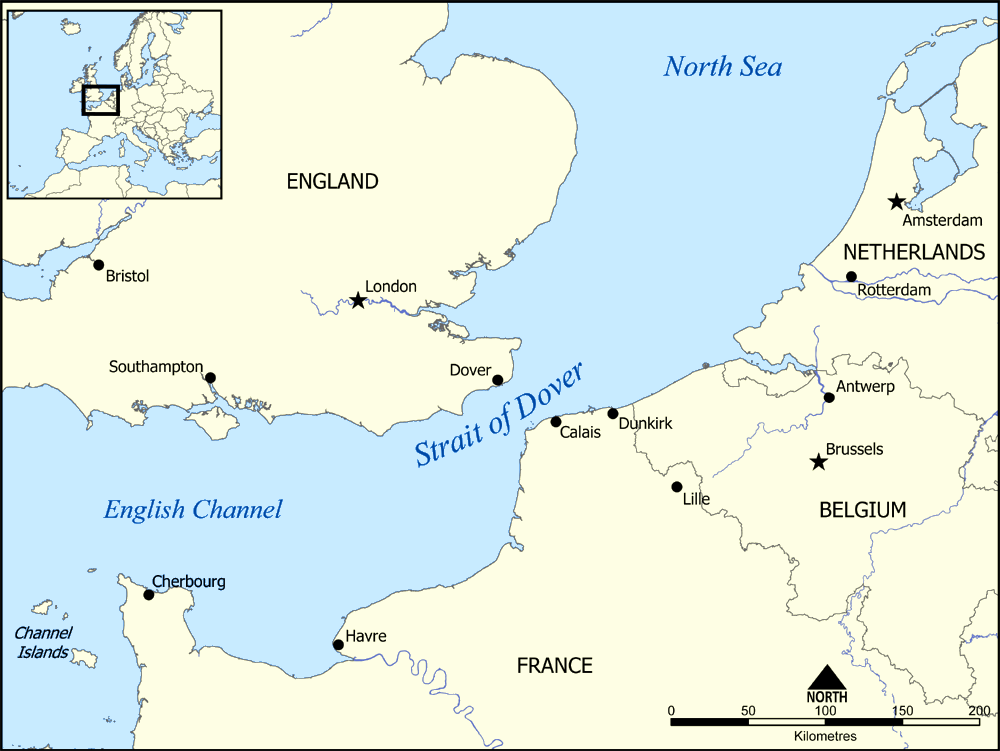
English Channel showing the Strait of Dover

People smuggling across Europe has become a common practice by criminal gangs in the 21st century. In recent times, significant numbers of migrants have crossed the English Channel from France to get to the UK. This included 25,700 between the start of 2021 and the time of this incident. In the past many migrants illegally boarded lorries which used the Channel Tunnel, but as port security has tightened more have tried to cross in small inflatable boats.

Reasons for crossing the Channel include family reunion, common language, and British migration and labour rules. It is impossible to apply for asylum in the UK until they are physically in the country so many try to cross the English Channel illegally.

On 23 November The Times reported that, due to the increase in the number of migrants crossing from France to the UK, the UK had offered to provide police officers to help the French to patrol their beaches. This offer was reported to have been rejected by the French, due to concerns that it would represent a breach of their sovereignty.

== Incident ==
On 24 November 2021, an inflatable dinghy, carrying 30 migrants across the English Channel from France to the UK, capsized whilst still in French territorial waters near Calais and Dunkirk. Twenty-seven people were found dead, while two others survived and were rescued, and another is still missing. Sixteen of the victims were identified as Kurdish people from Iraqi Kurdistan, including ten men, four women and two children; four more were Afghan men, three Ethiopians, one Kurdish man from Iran, a Somali woman, one Vietnamese man, and an Egyptian man. Four suspected smugglers were arrested shortly after.

A Dover-based fisherman described to The Telegraph how he thought French vessels did not respond to Mayday calls from the French coastguard to attend the incident in French waters about 7 miles (11 km) off Calais. He said that the alarm was raised at about 1 pm and that there were about 15-20 large French fishing vessels off Calais at the time which did not respond. On the other hand, boats from HM Coastguard at Dover and the British Border Force's vessel BF Hurricane arrived on the scene around 45 minutes later.

The French authority that was responsible for overseeing the French side of the English Channel where the incident occurred said that a British helicopter from the Maritime Rescue Coordination Centre in Dover had joined a French naval helicopter and patrol vessel, a police boat, and a lifeboat to search for survivors and to recover bodies.

On 28 November, one of the two survivors was reported by Rudaw to have said that after their boat began to deflate they called the French authorities for help, but were told they were in British waters, so they called British authorities, but no one came to help. This was confirmed by the numerous records of the telephone calls and the testimonies of the victims' relatives and in November 2022, by elements from the French official enquiry.

The UK Maritime and Coastguard Agency said that on 24 November they had received "more than 90 alerts, including 999 emergency calls, from the English Channel" and had responded to all of the calls. However, a Guardian investigation reported that in the lead up to the disaster, hundreds of migrants were "left adrift" in the channel with no assistance. "Around 440 people appear to have been left adrift after the coastguard sent no rescue vessels to 19 reported boats carrying migrants in UK waters, according to an analysis of internal records and marine data seen by the Observer and Liberty Investigates. Experts said the failure to act appears to breach international law."

Meanwhile, an investigation by The Independent found that "It took the UK and French coastguards 12 hours to respond following the first mayday call, with the authorities arguing over who was responsible. By the time rescue vessels and aircraft arrived at the scene, all but two of the passengers had drowned and died of exposure."

== Inquiries ==
An inquiry in France in November 2022 indicated that the migrants called many times the emergency services in France and Britain, but no rescue was initiated following these calls. It later transpired that eighteen emergency calls were made by the migrants to the French authorities. It appears that the stricken dinghy, although in French waters, was not far from being in English waters, with the implication that each authority was expecting the other to come to the rescue first.

== Aftermath ==
There have been ongoing negotiations between the UK and France about the channel crossings and particularly the financing of border protections. Both the UK and France have said that more needs to be done to deal with the problem and suggested that the other side is not doing enough.

In June 2022, French police arrested fifteen suspected people smugglers in connection with the deaths. Another suspect was arrested in Britain in November. Nine people, including five French soldiers, were charged in May 2023 with failing to rescue the victims.

== Reactions ==
=== Political ===
==== From the United Kingdom ====
Prime Minister Boris Johnson said he was "shocked, appalled and deeply saddened" by the incident. Home Secretary Priti Patel commented that it was the "starkest possible reminder of the dangers of Channel crossings".

Natalie Elphicke, the MP for Dover, criticised the actions of the French authorities as "playing us for fools" after French police were seen watching a group of at least 40 migrants, including at least 5 children, gathering on the beach near Wimereux with a large inflatable boat, and staying in their car and taking no action, whilst the group took to the sea en route to the UK.

==== From France ====
Prime Minister Jean Castex described the incident as a "tragedy" and described the drowned as “victims of criminal smugglers who exploit their distress and injury”. French interior minister Gerald Darmanin said that "It is an appalling situation for France, for Europe and for humanity to see these people perish at sea because of people smugglers." The Mayor of Calais, Natacha Bouchart, blamed Johnson's lack of responsibility and inability to take quick action. She also said she had warned members of the government of exceptional pressure on refugees. A French local official described it as the worst ever incident, involving people trying to cross to the UK, in the English Channel.

On 27 November, Margaritis Schinas, vice-president of the European Commission, recalling that "the main slogan of the referendum campaign [on Brexit] was 'We take back control", explains that the United Kingdom has left the EU, it "must now decide how to organise the management of border control".

On 28 November, the Ministers of Interior of France, Belgium, the Netherlands, and the European Commission met in Calais and decided jointly to address the issue by deploying common EU resources at the border, including joint surveillance via Frontex.

Local member of Parliament for Calais Pierre-Henri Dumont blamed the tragedy on Brexit and criticised Boris Johnson. Damien Carême, an MEP from Europe Ecology, had previously proposed that France renounce the Le Touquet agreement.

=== Other ===
A representative of the migrant charity Joint Council for the Welfare of Immigrants said in response to the incident that the UK should take more refugees as it was a more stable place and could offer better protection, and "...if everybody is supposed to stay in France because we're slight to the west of France, then France can say the same thing to Italy, and then Italy can say the same thing to Libya, and in the end, the entire international refugee protection regime will crumble."

The International Organization for Migration stated that this incident was the biggest single loss of life in the English Channel since it began collecting data in 2014.

== Judicial ==
In September 2026, after a four week trial in Paris, six people were found guilty of involuntary homicide: they were sentenced to prison terms of between six and 10 years. Seven further people were sentenced for lesser crimes in relation to the case.

== In popular culture ==
Vincent Delecroix's 2023 novel, Naufrage, is based on this disaster. It is narrated by a fictional version of the radio operator who took the calls for help, and who refuses to be held more responsible than all the other factors that have contributed to the event. The book was longlisted for the Prix Goncourt and the English translation by Helen Stevenson was shortlisted for the 2025 International Booker Prize.

== See also ==
- Dover lorry deaths
- Essex lorry deaths
- 2015 European migrant crisis
- Migrants around Calais – an area from which many of the migrants have come
