= Demassieux =

Demassieux is a surname of French origin. Notable people with the surname include:

- Jeanne Demessieux (1921-1968), French musician
- Claude Demassieux (born 1946), French politician
- Nathalie Demassieux (1884–1961), French chemist and academic

== See also ==
- Jeanne Demessieux
