= Prix Sainte-Beuve =

French literary prize

The Prix Sainte-Beuve, established in 1946, is a French literary prize awarded each year to a writer in the categories "novels" (or "poetry") and "essays" (or "critics"); it is named after the writer Charles-Augustin Sainte-Beuve. The founding jury included Raymond Aron, Maurice Blanchot, Edmond Buchet, Maurice Nadeau, Jean Paulhan and Raymond Queneau.

== Laureates ==
- 1946: Georges Navel for Travaux
- 1946: Raymond Abellio for Heureux les pacifiques
- 1947: Victor Kravtchenko for J'ai choisi la liberté
- 1947: Julien Blanc for Seule la vie Tome 2, Joyeux, fais ton fourbi...
- 1947 (January 1948): Armand Hoog for L'accident
- 1947 (January 1948): Antonin Artaud for Van Gogh ou le suicide de la société
- 1948: André Dhôtel for David
- 1948: Louis Martin-Chauffier for L'Homme et la bête
- 1949: Gilbert Cesbron for Notre prison est un royaume
- 1949: Claude Mauriac for André Breton
- 1949: Lise Deharme for La porte à côté
- 1949: Claude-Edmonde Magny for L'Âge d'or du roman américain
- 1950: François Gorrec for La Septième Lune
- 1950: Jean-Charles Pichon for Il faut que je tue M. Rumann
- 1951: Georges Poulet for Études sur le temps humain
- 1952: Pierre Boulle for The Bridge over the River Kwai
- 1952: René Étiemble for Le Mythe de Rimbaud
- 1953: Pierre Moinot for La Chasse royale
- 1954: Suzanne Lilar for Le Journal de l'analogiste
- 1955: Jean-Claude Brisville for D'un amour
- 1956: Henri Thomas for La Cible
- 1956: André Brincourt for Les Œuvres et les lumières
- 1957: Alexis Curvers for Tempo di Roma
- 1957: Alain Bosquet for Poèmes - Les Testaments - Tome 1 (ou Premier testament)
- 1957: Emil Cioran for La tentation d'exister (refused)
- 1958: Mongo Beti for Mission Terminée
- 1958: Jean Cathelin for Marcel Aymé ou le paysan de Paris
- 1959: Gilbert Prouteau for La Peur des femmes
- 1961: Robert Abirached for Casanova ou la Dissipation
- 1961: Patrick Waldberg for Promenoir de Paris
- 1962: Jérôme Peignot for L’Or des fous
- 1962: Robert Poulet for Contre l'amour
- 1963: Alphonse Boudard for La Cerise
- 1963: Bernard Delvaille for Essai sur Valery Larbaud
- 1964: Michel Breitman for Sébastien
- 1965: Roger Rabiniaux for Le Soleil des dortoirs
- 1966: Daniel Boulanger for Le Chemin des caracoles
- 1966: Jean-Claude Renard for La terre du sacre
- 1968: Lucie Faure for L'Autre personne
- 1968: Marc Soriano for les Contes de Perrault, culture savante et tradition populaire
- 1969: Pierre Schaeffer for Le Gardien de volcan
- 1969: Jean-Pierre Attal for L'Image "métaphysique" et autres essais
- 1981 : Jacques Le Goff for La Naissance du purgatoire
- 1982: Laurence Cossé for Les Chambres du Sud
- 1983: Michel Luneau for Folle-alliée
- 1984: Vladan Radoman for Le Ravin
- 1985: Marie-Claire Bancquart for Anatole France, un sceptique passionné
- 1986: Rafaël Pividal for Grotius
- 1987: Boris Schreiber for La Traversée du dimanche
- 1987: Éric Ollivier for Les livres dans la peau

== Prix Sainte-Beuve des collégiens ==
In 2008 a Prix Sainte-Beuve des collégiens, also called Prix Sainte-Beuve des collégiens et des apprentis was created. An interschool contest literary critic takes place before the election of a youth novel by college students and apprentices. Designed and coordinated by Pierric Maelstaf, this price is borne by the association "çà & là" and the County Council of Pas-de-Calais.

== List of laureates ==
- 2008: Hélène Vignal for Passé au rouge
- 2009: Yaël Hassan for Suivez-moi jeune homme
- 2010: Gemma Malley for La Déclaration
- 2011: Julia Billet for Sayonara samouraï
- 2012: Jay Asher for Treize Raisons
- 2013: Yves Grevet for Seuls dans la ville
- 2014: Florence Hinckel for Théa pour l'éternité
- 2015: Isabelle Pandazopoulos for "La Décision"
