= Abirached =

Abirached is a surname. Notable people with the surname include:

- Raya Abirached (born 1977), Lebanese television presenter and celebrity journalist
- Robert Abirached (1930–2021), French writer and theatrologist
- Zeina Abirached (born 1981), Lebanese illustrator, graphic novelist, and comic artist
