= Pas-de-Calais's 7th constituency =

Constituency of the National Assembly of France

7th constituency of the Pas-de-Calais
- inline Constituency of the National Assembly of France

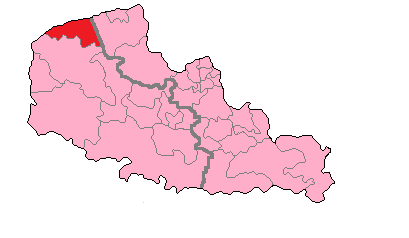
- Pas-de-Calais' 7th constituency shown within Nord-Pas-de-Calais
- Deputy: Marc de Fleurian; National Rally
- Department: Pas-de-Calais
- Cantons: Audruicq, Calais-Centre, Calais-Est, Calais-Nord-Ouest, Calais-Sud-Est
- Registered voters: 92,392

The 7th constituency of the Pas-de-Calais is a French legislative constituency in the Pas-de-Calais département.

== Description ==
Pas-de-Calais' 7th constituency includes the whole of the port city of Calais.

Until 2017, the constituency consistently elected candidates from the Socialist Party with the exception of conservative landslide in 1993. Yann Capet's father, André Capet also represented the seat, holding it until his death in 2000.

== Historic Representation ==
Election	Member	Party
1986	Proportional representation - no election by constituency	
1988	André Capet	PS
1993	Claude Demassieux	RPR
1997	André Capet	PS
2001	Gilles Cocquempot	PS
2002	Gilles Cocquempot	PS
2007	Gilles Cocquempot	PS
2012	Yann Capet	PS
2017	Pierre-Henri Dumont	LR
2022	Pierre-Henri Dumont	LR
2024	Marc de Fleurian	RN

== Election results ==
=== 2024 ===
Candidate	Party	Alliance	First round			Second round		
Candidate	Party	Alliance	Votes	%	+/–	Votes	%	+/–
Marc de Fleurian	RN		26,995	47.86	+18.65	29,282	51.86	+7.69
Pierre-Henri Dumont	LR	UDC	19,036	33.75	+6.46	27,177	48.14	-7.69
Jean-Pierre Moussally	LE	NFP	9,184	16.28	-3.00			
Olivier Carraud	LO		701	1.24	-0.10			
Jérôme Judek	REC		492	0.87	-1.38			
Votes			56,408	100.00		56,459	100.00	
Valid votes			56,408	97.91	-0.20	56,459	96.98	+3.21
Blank votes			779	1.35	+0.15	1,112	1.91	-2.17
Null votes			423	0.73	+0.04	649	1.11	-1.04
Turnout			57,610	60.86	+18.89	58,220	61.49	+20.61
Abstentions			37,049	39.14	-18.89	36,462	38.51	-20.61
Registered voters			94,659			94,682		
Result			RN GAIN FROM LR					

=== 2022 ===
Legislative Election 2022: Pas-de-Calais's 7th constituency
Party	Candidate	Votes	%	±%
RN	Marc de Fleurian	11,313	29.21	+4.81
LR (UDC)	Pierre-Henri Dumont	10,570	27.29	+5.62
EELV (NUPÉS)	Jean-Pierre Moussally	7,468	19.28	−11.41
MoDem (Ensemble)	Henri Waroczyk	6,063	15.65	−4.67
REC	Frédéric Berteloot	871	2.25	N/A
Others	N/A	2,446	6.32	
Turnout		38,731	41.97	−3.02
2nd round result
LR (UDC)	Pierre-Henri Dumont	20,132	55.83	-5.00
RN	Marc de Fleurian	15,930	44.17	+5.00
Turnout		38,731	41.97	+0.90
LR hold				

=== 2017 ===
Candidate	Label	First round		Second round	
Candidate	Label	Votes	%	Votes	%
Philippe Olivier	FN	10,033	24.40	13,707	39.17
Pierre-Henri Dumont	LR	8,907	21.67	21,284	60.83
Dominique Piedfort	MoDem	8,354	20.32		
Yann Capet	PS	5,211	12.68		
Anne-Sophie Ligniert	FI	4,742	11.53		
Jacky Hénin	PCF	1,744	4.24		
Francis Gest	ECO	922	2.24		
Sébastien Lecoustre	DLF	510	1.24		
Françoise Millot	EXG	282	0.69		
Janick Charlet	DIV	150	0.36		
Marie-Jeanne Vincent	EXD	141	0.34		
Isabelle Fatoux	EXG	116	0.28		
Votes		41,112	100.00	34,991	100.00
Valid votes		41,112	97.98	34,991	91.34
Blank votes		550	1.31	2,151	5.61
Null votes		299	0.71	1,168	3.05
Turnout		41,961	44.99	38,310	41.07
Abstentions		51,316	55.01	54,973	58.93
Registered voters		93,277		93,283	
Source: Ministry of the Interior

=== 2012 ===
Legislative Election 2012: Pas-de-Calais's 7th constituency
Party	Candidate	Votes	%	±%
PS	Yann Capet	15,860	33.64	+7.01
UMP	Philippe Mignonet	8,806	18.68	−15.02
FN	Françoise Vernalde	7,330	15.55	+8.66
FG	Jacky Henin	6,946	14.73	+7.24
DVD	Michel Hamy	2,640	5.60	N/A
DVD	Catherine Fournier	2,499	5.30	N/A
Others	N/A	3,068		
Turnout		47,149	51.02	−5.39
2nd round result
PS	Yann Capet	26,861	61.44	+10.73
UMP	Philippe Mignonet	16,857	38.56	−10.73
Turnout		43,718	47.32	−9.98
PS hold				

=== 2007 ===
Legislative Election 2007: Pas-de-Calais's 7th constituency
Party	Candidate	Votes	%	±%
UMP	Natacha Bouchart	15,924	33.70	
PS	Gilles Cocquempot	12,581	26.63	
PCF	Marcel Levaillant	3,537	7.49	
DVD	Bernard Carpentier	3,401	7.20	
FN	François Dubout	3,257	6.89	
MoDem	Arnaud Leclair	2,894	6.13	
Far left	Laurent Roussel	1,574	3.33	
CPNT	Lionel Varrier-Bal	1,555	3.29	
LV	Jacques Goubelle	1,103	2.33	
Others	N/A	1,420		
Turnout		48,421	56.41	
2nd round result
PS	Gilles Cocquempot	23,994	50.71	
UMP	Natacha Bouchart	23,319	49.29	
Turnout		49,173	57.30	
PS hold				

=== 2002 ===
Legislative Election 2002: Pas-de-Calais's 7th constituency
Party	Candidate	Votes	%	±%
PS	Gilles Cocquempot	11,944	26.09	
UMP	Natacha Bouchart	9,208	20.11	
FN	Michel Ximenes	6,151	13.44	
UDF	Arnaud Leclair	5,313	11.61	
PCF	Marcel Levaillant	3,800	8.30	
CPNT	Francis Fontaine	2,420	5.29	
DVD	Isabelle Dehouck	2,130	4.65	
LO	Dominique Wailly	1,108	2.42	
Others	N/A	3,706		
Turnout		47,172	58.05	
2nd round result
PS	Gilles Cocquempot	22,541	52.14	
UMP	Natacha Bouchart	20,694	47.86	
Turnout		45,768	56.32	
PS hold				

=== 1997 ===
Legislative Election 1997: Pas-de-Calais's 7th constituency
Party	Candidate	Votes	%	±%
PS	André Capet	15,606	31.62	
RPR	Claude Demassieux	13,616	27.59	
PCF	Jacky Henin	6,961	14.10	
FN	Raymond Mortier	6,213	12.59	
LV	Mireille Gest	3,343	6.77	
DVD	Robert Deroi	1,840	3.73	
Far left	Christian Guffroy	1,778	3.60	
Turnout		52,286	67.59	
2nd round result
PS	André Capet	31,144	60.31	
RPR	Claude Demassieux	20,493	39.69	
Turnout		55,177	71.33	
PS hold				

== Sources ==
- Official results of French elections from 1998: "Résultats électoraux officiels en France" (in French).
