= André Capet =

French politician

Member of the National Assembly for Pas-de-Calais's 7th constituency
- In office 12 June 1997 – 31 December 2000
- Preceded by: Claude Demassieux
- Succeeded by: Gilles Cocquempot
- In office 12 June 1988 – 1 April 1993
- Preceded by: constituency established
- Succeeded by: Claude Demassieux

Personal details
- Born: 30 November 1939 Couloisy, France
- Died: 31 December 2000 (aged 61) Avoriaz, France
- Party: Socialist
- Children: Yann Capet

André Capet (30 November 1939 – 31 December 2000) was a French politician for the Socialist Party, who served as a member of the National Assembly between 1993 and 1997 until his death in 2000, representing the Pas-de-Calais's 7th constituency. His son Yann Capet represented the same seat between 2012 and 2017.
