= André Brincourt =

French writer and journalist (1920–2016)

André Brincourt (8 November 1920, Neuilly-sur-Seine then Seine (department) – 22 March 2016 aged 95) was a French writer and journalist.

== Biography ==
A former resistant, volunteer at eighteen during the Second World War (prisoner then escaped, he engaged in the Combat movement of the region of Nice,) André Brincourt directed the cultural pages, then the literary supplement of the newspaper Le Figaro. He was also a literary journalist on television and had television interviews with André Malraux, of which he was a friend.

Alongside his work as a journalist, he wrote about twenty books in a wide variety of literary genres, ranging from poetry to novel. In his last years, he seemed to have a preference for the fragment and the aphorism as evidenced by his latest publications.

A member of the prix Renaudot from 1984 to 2011, following his resignation he was awarded the Grand prix de littérature de l'Académie française in 1999 for all his work.

== Works ==
- 1946: Satan et la Poésie, essay, Grasset
- 1948: Désarroi de l'écriture, essay, Vigneau
- 1950: Le Vert Paradis, novel, La Table Ronde – prix du Jeune Roman
- 1952: La Farandole, novel, La Table Ronde – prix Henri-Dumarest 1953 of the Académie française.
- 1956: Les Œuvres et les Lumières, essay, La Table Ronde – prix Sainte-Beuve
- 1957: Les Yeux clos, novel, La Table Ronde
- 1959: La Télévision et ses promesses, essay, La Table Ronde
- 1965: La Télévision, notes et maximes, Hachette
- 1965: Malraux ou le temps du silence, essay, La Table Ronde
- 1973: Noir sur blanc, essai, Fayard
- 1979: Le Musée imaginaire de la littérature du XXe, Éditions Retz
- 1986: Malraux, le malentendu, essay, Grasset – prix Georges-Dupau 1987 of the Académie française.
- 1988: Les Yeux clos, noel, Grasset
- 1990: La Parole dérobée, noel, Grasset
- 1995: Messagers de la nuit : Roger Martin du Gard, Saint-John Perse, André Malraux , essay, Grasset – Prix de la Critique de l'Académie française.
- 1996: Secrètes Araignées, essay, Grasset
- 1997: Langue française, terre d'accueil, essay, éditions du Rocher – vermeil medal of the Grand prix de la francophonie.
- 1999: Vive les mouches, essay, Grasset
- 2000: Le Bonheur de rompre, novel, Grasset
- 2001: Le Paradis désenchanté, éditions du Rocher
- 2003: Tête-de-loup, essay, Grasset
- 2005: La Mer, l'Amour et la Mort, poetry, Privat
- 2006 Les Conquérants d'eux-mêmes, essay, Grasset
- 2007: Insomnies, pensées, Grasset
- 2009: Vienne le vent, poetry, Melis éditions
- 2010: Littératures d’outre-tombe, essay, Grasset

== Prizes and distinctions ==
- 1945: Croix de guerre 1939–1945 and Médaille de la Résistance.
- 1956: Prix Sainte-Beuve
- 1997: Grande médaille de la francophonie
- 1999: Grand prix de littérature de l'Académie française for all his work
