= Yann Capet =

French politician

Member of the National Assembly for Pas-de-Calais's 7th constituency
- In office 20 June 2012 – 21 June 2017
- Preceded by: Gilles Cocquempot
- Succeeded by: Pierre-Henri Dumont

Personal details
- Born: 31 December 1975 (age 50) Calais, France
- Party: Socialist
- Parent: André Capet
- Education: University of the Littoral Opal Coast

Yann Capet (born 31 December 1975) is a French politician for the Socialist Party, who served as a member of the National Assembly between 2012 and 2017, representing the Pas-de-Calais's 7th constituency.
