= Georges Navel =

French writer (1904–1993)

- Born: Charles François Victor Navel; 30 October 1904; Pont-à-Mousson
- Died: 1 November 1993 (aged 89); Die, Drôme
- Occupation: Writer

Georges Navel (1904–1993) was a French laborer, writer, and anarchist.

== Selected works ==
- 1945: Travaux, Stock, (Prix Sainte-Beuve in 1946) [Man At Work, Dennis Dobson, 1949]
- 1950: Parcours, Gallimard
- 1952: Sable et limon, Gallimard
- 1960: Chacun son royaume, Gallimard
- 1982: Passages, Le Sycomore
