= Marc Chadourne =

French writer (1895–1975)

- Born: 23 May 1895; Brive-la-Gaillarde, Corrèze
- Died: 30 January 1975 (aged 79); Cagnes-sur-Mer, Alpes-Maritimes
- Occupation: Writer

Marc Chadourne (French pronunciation: [maʁk ʃaduʁn]; 23 May 1895 – 30 January 1975) was a 20th-century French writer, winner of the Prix Femina in 1930.

== Biography ==
Marc Chadourne was writer Louis Chadourne's brother. He studied at the Sorbonne. Engaged at 19 in 1914 at the beginning of the First World War, he joined the field artillery in Lorraine and on the front of Artois. He became a pupil-pilot in 1916 and ended the war in aviation on the eastern front.

Back in Paris in 1919 and marked by war - he decided then for a wandering life in search of discoveries - Marc Chadourne was received first in the entry competition to the Ministère des Colonies. He held positions in the colonial administration in Oceania and then in Cameroon. A translator of novels by Joseph Conrad, he also lent his pen to many newspapers. In 1927 he published Vasco, a novel set in French Polynesia, in memory of his brother. In 1930, he obtained the prix Femina for Cécile de la Folie. When the Second World War broke out, he took refuge in the United States and became a professor at Scripps College in Claremont in California then in the University of Utah in Salt Lake City. He met the Mormons and wrote a biography of Joseph Smith.

In 1950, the Académie française rewarded him with its Grand prix de littérature for all of his work. His features remain fixed by a portrait painted by Raymonde Heudebert.

== Work ==
- 1927: Vasco, Plon, Prix Paul Flat of the Acadéie française, reprinted in 1994 at éditions la Table ronde
- 1930: Cécile de la Folie, Plon — prix Femina
- 1931: Chine, Plon
- 1932: L'U.R.S.S. sans passion, Plon (illustrated edition published by Mornay in 1932)
- 1933: Absence, Plon
- 1934: Anahuac ou l'Indien sans ses plumes, Plon
- 1935: Extrême-Occident (Tour de la Terre *), Plon
- 1935: Extrême-Orient (Tour de la Terre **), Plon
- 1937: Dieu créa d'abord Lilith, Plon
- 1947: La Clé perdue, Plon
- 1949: Gladys ou les Artifices, Plon
- 1950: Quand Dieu se fit Américain, éditions Arthème-Fayard
- 1955: Le Mal de Colleen, Plon
- 1958: Restif de la Bretonne, Plon
- 1961: Isabelle ou le Journal amoureux d'Espagne, éditions Jean-Jacques Pauvert
- 1967: Eblis ou l'Enfer de William Beckford, éditions Jean-Jacques Pauvert
