= Émile Amann =

French historian (1880–1948)

Émile Amann (4 June 1880, Pont-à-Mousson – 11 January 1948, Strasbourg) was a French historian of the Church.

After studying at the major seminary of Nancy, Émile Amann continued his training at the Catholic Institute in Paris. He was mobilized in 1914 and fought during the four years of First World War. After his demobilization, he joined the faculty of Catholic theology of the University of Strasbourg (re-founded after the return to France of the three departments annexed in 1870), where he taught the ancient history of the Church until his death.

He is notable for his collaboration with the Dictionnaire de théologie catholique, from 1922 to his death.

== Works ==
- 1910: Le Protévangile de Jacques et ses remaniements latins
- 1903: Les actes de Paul et ses épîtres apocryphes
- 1902: Les actes de Pierre
- 1920: Le Dogme catholique dans les Pères de l’Église
- 1928: L’Église des premiers siècles
- 1938: L'époque carolingienne
- 1940: L’Église au pouvoir. Les laïcs
