= Marc de Fleurian =

French politician (born 1989)

Captain Marc de Fleurian
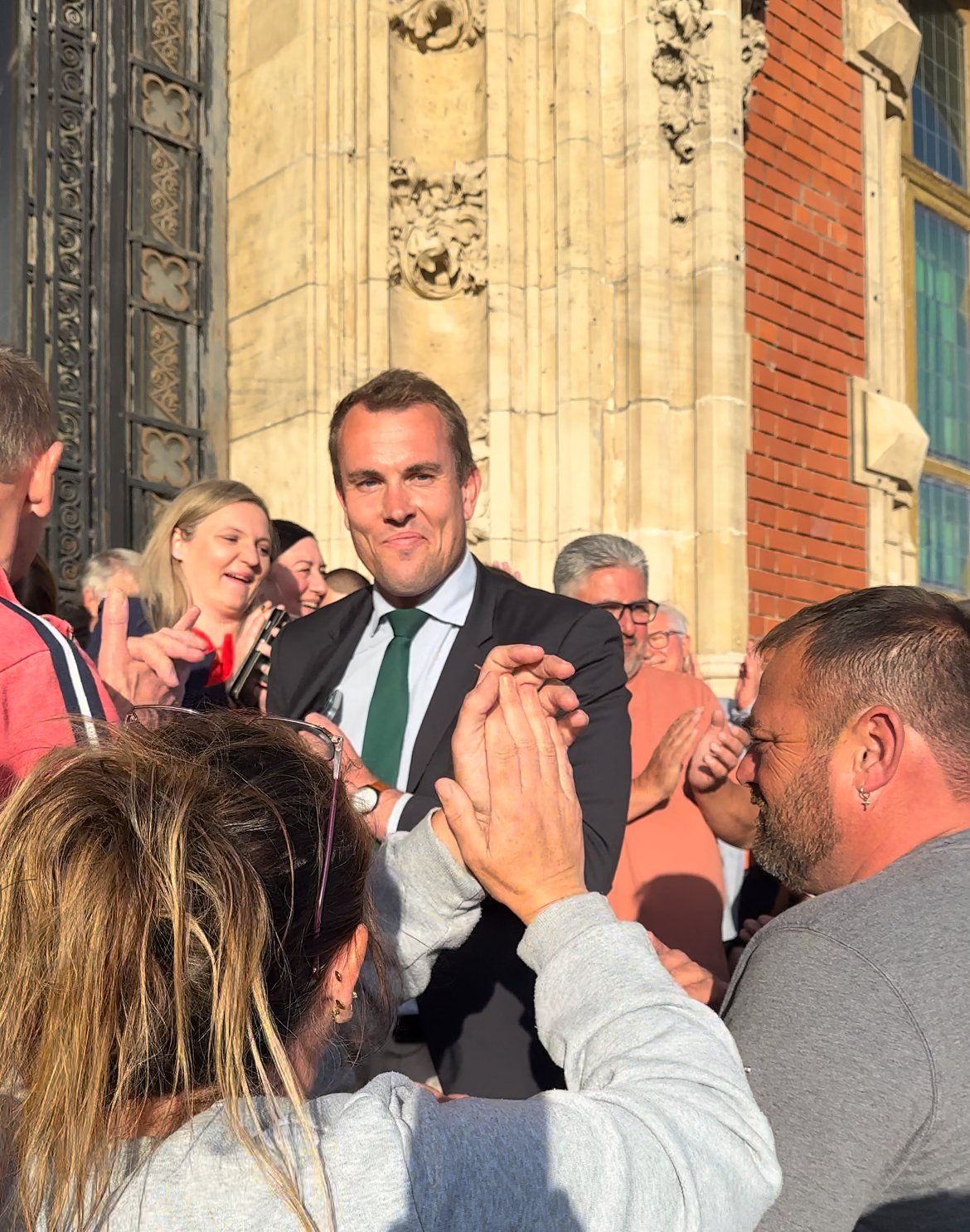
- Marc de Fleurian in 2024

Member of the National Assembly for Pas-de-Calais's 7th constituency
- Incumbent
- Assumed office 8 July 2024
- Preceded by: Pierre-Henri Dumont

Personal details
- Born: Marc-Alexandre Marie Jean-Patrice de Fleurian; 7 February 1989 (age 37) Ploemeur, France
- Party: National Rally
- Education: École spéciale militaire de Saint-Cyr
- Occupation: Military officer, parliamentary assistant, politician

Marc-Alexandre Marie Jean-Patrice de Fleurian "Marc" de Fleurian (French pronunciation: [maʁk də flœʁjɑ̃]; born 7 February 1989) is a French politician and former military officier who was elected the deputy in the National Assembly for the 7th constituency of Pas-de-Calais in 2024. A member of the National Rally (RN), he unseated incumbent Pierre-Henri Dumont of The Republicans (LR) with 51.8% of the second-round vote. He has also held a seat in the municipal council of Calais since 2020.

== Early career ==
A native of Ploemeur, Morbihan, Marc de Fleurian was admitted to the École spéciale militaire de Saint-Cyr in 2009. He reached the rank of captain within the French Foreign Legion before retiring from active service and being recruited as a natural areas manager in Africa.

He returned to France to work as a parliamentary assistant at the European Parliament from 2019 and later at the National Assembly from 2022.

== Political career ==
In the 2020 municipal election, Marc de Fleurian led the National Rally list in Calais and was elected a municipal councillor.

In the 2024 snap legislative election, he was elected to the National Assembly in the 7th constituency of Pas-de-Calais, defeating incumbent Pierre-Henri Dumont of The Republicans. The second round, which he won with 51.8% of the vote, was a rematch of 2022, when Dumont won with 55.8%.

== See also ==
- List of deputies of the 17th National Assembly of France
