= Claude-Edmonde Magny =

French woman of letters

Claude-Edmonde Magny, real name Edmonde Vinel (1913–1966) was a French woman of letters.

== Biography ==
Edmonde Vinel was received at the entrance examination of the École normale supérieure, rue d’Ulm, the only woman of her class (1932, that of Georges Bonnefoy, Jean Gosset and Latinist Pierre Grimal whom she later married).

An agrégée in philosophy, she taught on the eve of the war at the Rennes high school. She participated in the Congress Esprit at Jouy-en-Josas in 1939, where the joung Jorge Semprún met her (He later gave an account of their relations in L'Écriture ou la Vie). In the spring of 1940, she began her collaboration with the magazine Esprit under the pseudonym Claude-Edmonde Magny, alternating reflection articles (about Aldous Huxley in February) and notes on recent literary works. After the war, and until 1951, she gave Esprit a dozen articles on Georges Bataille, the writers of the deportation and Sartre, Joyce, Malraux, Mauriac, Balzac. They were mostly taken up in a posthumous collection, with those published in Poésie 46 and 47, in Preuves and other magazines.

She was a tutor of French at Newnham College, Cambridge. Her students included cognitive psychologist Anne Treisman.

== Selected works ==
- 1949: L'âge d'or du roman américain, Prix Sainte-Beuve
- Lettre sur le pouvoir d'écrire, Paris, Éditions Flammarion, series "Climats", 2012, ISBN 978-2-08-128220-9
- Littérature et critique, Paris, Éditions Payot, 1971
