= Pierre-Henri Dumont =

French politician (born 1987)

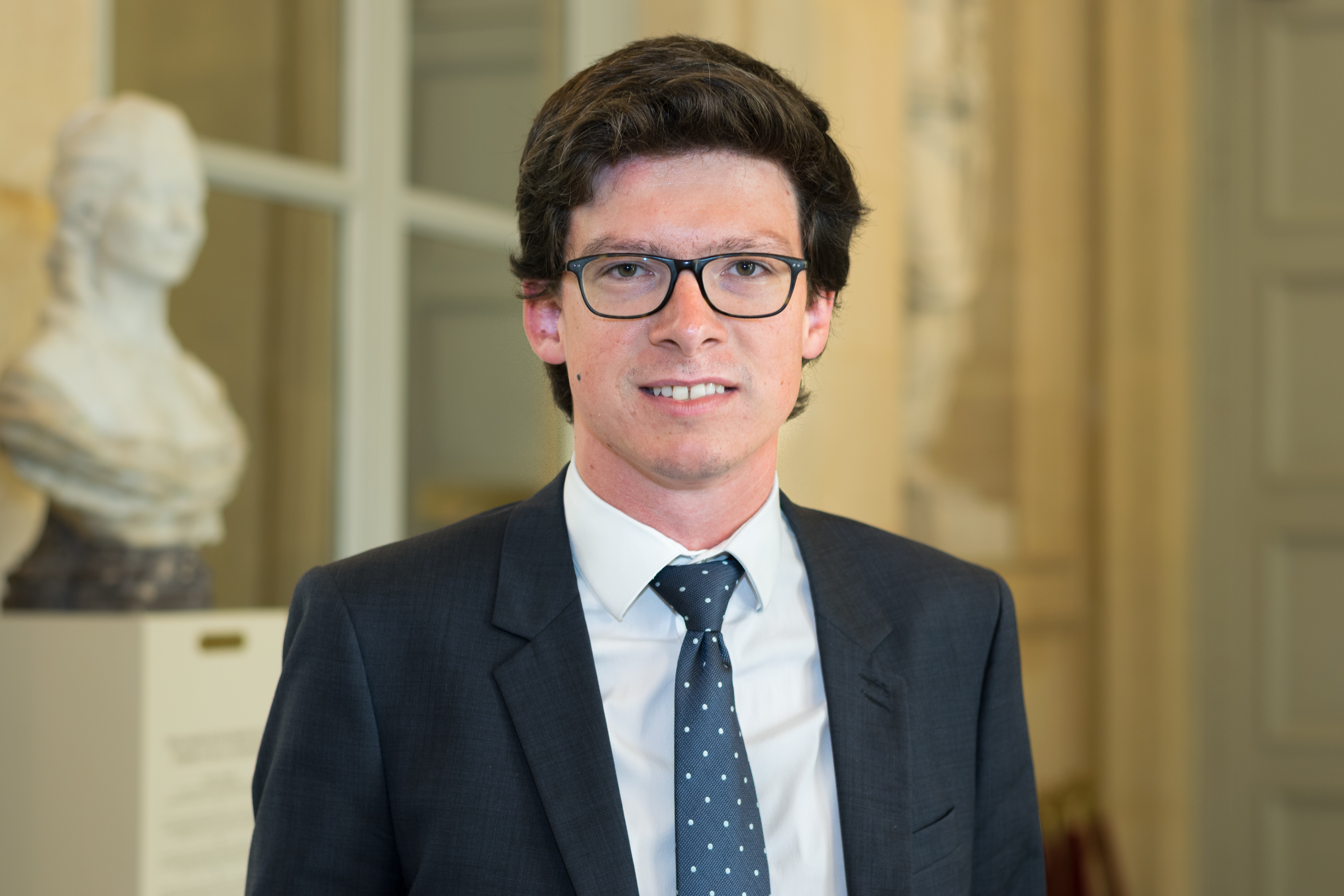

Member of the National Assembly for Pas-de-Calais's 7th constituency
- In office 21 June 2017 – 9 June 2024
- Preceded by: Yann Capet
- Succeeded by: Marc de Fleurian

Personal details
- Born: 7 October 1987 (age 38) Grande-Synthe, Dunkirk, France
- Party: UMP (2009-2015); LR (since 2015); NF (since 2022)
- Education: Sciences Po

Pierre-Henri Dumont (French pronunciation: [pjɛʁ ɑ̃ʁi dymɔ̃]; born 7 October 1987) is a French politician of the Republicans (French language: Les Républicains) who was a member of the National Assembly from June 2017 to 2024, representing the Pas-de-Calais's 7th constituency. His constituency contains the port city of Calais.

== Early life and education ==
Dumont is a graduate of Sciences Po in Paris. During his studies, he completed a year abroad at Johns Hopkins University and an internship in the office of Carolyn McCarthy at the United States House of Representatives in Washington, D.C.

== Political career ==
=== Career in local politics ===
Dumont served as Mayor of Marck from 2014 to 2017.

=== Member of the National Assembly, 2017–present ===
Dumont was elected to the French Parliament in 2017, defeating National Rally Member of the European Parliament, Philippe Olivier in the second round. In parliament, he serves on the Committee on Foreign Affairs and the Committee on European Affairs.

Since 2019, Dumont has also been a member of the French delegation to the Franco-German Parliamentary Assembly.

Dumont endorsed Christian Jacob as the party’s chairman in the run-up to the Republicans’ 2019 convention, and later supported Aurélien Pradié’s candidacy to succeed Jacob in 2022; in the second round of voting, he eventually supported Éric Ciotti.

He was reelected in the 2022 election. In the 2024 election, he lost his seat in the second round to National Rally's Marc de Fleurian.

== Political positions ==
In the summer of 2020, Dumont disputed the claims of Priti Patel, the British Home Secretary that French authorities were not stopping migrants from leaving France and crossing the English Channel. Dumont blamed British law for the situation.

After the November 2021 English Channel disaster, Dumont spoke to CNN and criticized Prime Minister Boris Johnson.
