= Michel Luneau =

French poet (1934–2012)

Michel Luneau (30 January 1934 – 19 July 2012) was a French poet, writer, publisher, and art collector from Brittany. Born in Nantes, he authored numerous works that blended poetry and prose, exploring themes of art and culture. From 1998, Luneau directed the Centre for Contemporary Art of La Rairie in Pont-Saint-Martin, where he showcased emerging artists. He was known for his explorations of the intersection between literature and visual art, merging narrative and critique to deepen the understanding of both fields.

Luneau was also a former radio personality in the Nantes region and contributed to the media landscape through his work. He served on the editorial board of Place publique, a journal focused on urban issues, directed by journalist Franck Renaud. His writings in various literary and art journals contributed to discussions on modern art movements and the role of collectors.

As a collector, Luneau was recognized for his discerning taste and commitment to supporting new talent, which left a lasting impact on audiences worldwide. His passion for writing and art continues to resonate, influencing emerging artists and writers. Luneau died in Pont-Saint-Martin after a prolonged illness.

== Bibliography ==
- Le Mal vivant, Sylvain Chiffoleau, 1956
- Solitude à plusieurs voix pour une mort naturelle (poèmes, tirage réservé), 1976
- O Positif (poèmes), Saint-Germain-des-prés, 1977 ISBN 2243004887
- O Positif (recueil orné par Antoni Guansé), Saint-Germain-des-prés, 1977
- La Nuit des autres, Saint-Germain-des-prés, collection Théâtre, 1977 ISBN 2243004879
- Mort à vivre, illustré par Alix Axthausen, Saint-Germain-des-prés, 1978
- Le Cantique des organes, Saint-Germain-des-prés, 1978 ISBN 2243004283
- La Maison du poète, Saint-Germain-des-prés/Armand Colin, collection "L'enfant, la Poésie", 1979 ISBN 2243011921
- Douceur du sang, illustré par Alix Axthausen, Saint-Germain-des-prés, 1980
- Le Mémorial du sang, Éditions Grasset, 1981 ISBN 2-246-23101-9 BnF 34682215p
- Folle-alliée (roman), Grasset, 1982 (Prix Sainte-Beuve) ISBN 2246282411
- Chroniques de la vie d'en dessous (roman), Grasset, 1984 ISBN 2246309514
- Sexe-je, Grasset, 1986 ISBN 2246372011
- La Légende du corps (roman), François Bourin, 1989 ISBN 2876860236
- L'Autredi (roman), François Bourin, 1990 (Prix du roman de la Société des gens de lettres, Prix le Procope, Avoriaz 1991) ISBN 2876860678
- Paroles d'arbre, Julliard, 1994 ISBN 2260001319
- Gabriel, archange (roman), Flammarion, 1996 (Prix de la ville de Nantes) ISBN 2080673483
- Rouge profond (poèmes), Peintures de Tony Soulié, Climats, 1999 ISBN 2841581241
- Voiture 13, place 64 (roman), Verticales, 2000 (Prix de l'Ouest) ISBN 2843350433
- Minimales et Maximiennes (recueil d'aphorismes), collages de Thierry Renard, Climats, 2002 ISBN 2841582167
- La Rairie dans tout son état, Gallimard, 2003 ISBN 2843351650
- Paroles d'arbre (extraits), édition illustrée par Tony Soulié, Climats, 2003
- L'Œil excessif : Entre Loire et Océan, illustré par Tony Soulié, Joca Seria, 2004 ISBN 2848090308
- Euphorismes (aphorismes), Joca Seria, 2004 ISBN 2848090235
- Avis de passage (roman), Joca Seria, 2005 ISBN 2848090561
- Transmission de pensées (aphorismes), Joca Seria, 2006 ISBN 2848090707
- Juste avant d'écrire (roman), Joca Seria, 2007 ISBN 2848090847
- Antonin, chambre 409 (poèmes pour enfants), illustrations de Michel Jouët, Joca Seria, 2009 ISBN 978-2-84809-119-8 BnF 42098365z
- La séparation de corps, suivi de Règles de trois, illustration Tony Soulié, Joca Seria, 2009 ISBN 9782848091037
- Pour l'amour des mots (euphorismes), Joca Seria, 2010 ISBN 9782848091501
- L'adieu aux arbres et aux oiseaux (roman), poèmes et collages de Thierry Renard, Joca Seria, 2011 ISBN 9782848091617
- À vol d'oiseau (poème)
