= Vincent Delecroix =

French philosopher and writer

- In a 2023 interview
- Born: Vincent Philippe Pierre Maurice Delecroix; 26 November 1969 (age 56); Paris, France
- Education: École normale supérieure
- Occupations: Philosopher; Novelist
- Employer: École pratique des hautes études
- Writing career
- Genres: Fiction; Philosophy
- Subjects: Philosophy of religion, Søren Kierkegaard
- Notable works: Ce qui est perdu (2007); Tombeau d'Achille (2008); Naufrage (2023)
- Notable awards: Prix Valery Larbaud (2007); Grand prix de littérature de l'Académie française (2008)

Vincent Philippe Pierre Maurice Delecroix (born 26 November 1969) is a French philosopher and novelist. He is a specialist on Søren Kierkegaard, on whom he did his doctoral thesis. He has published ten full-length works on philosophy and teaches at the Ecole Pratique des Hautes Etudes. He has published eight full-length works of fiction.

He received the Prix Valery Larbaud in 2007 for the novel Ce qui est perdu and the Grand prix de littérature de l'Académie française in 2008 for the novel Tombeau d'Achille. Small Boat, Helen Stevenson's translation of his 2023 novel Naufrage, was shortlisted for the 2025 International Booker Prize.

== Life ==
Born in Paris in 1969, Delecroix graduated from the city's École normale supérieure and is an agrégé of philosophy. He teaches and is director of studies at the Ecole Pratique des Hautes Etudes, specialising in philosophy of religion and Søren Kierkegaard.

His literary and philosophical work is attentive to existential acts and experiences, such as love, singing and the sacred.

== Awards and distinctions ==
He was made a Chevalier of the Ordre des Arts et des Lettres in 2007 and a Chevalier of the Ordre national du Mérite in 2023.

In 2020, his book Apprendre à perdre won the Prix PhiloMonaco de l'Essai (Essay Prize).

== Works ==
=== La chaussure sur le toit ===
Delecroix's 2007 work La chaussure sur le toit consists of ten short stories on the same theme: a shoe placed on the roof of the building opposite, in Paris. Each story explores the history and character of a different protagonist: a dreamy child, a burglar in love, three crazy thugs, an undocumented immigrant, a television presenter, a melancholic dog, a homosexual firefighter, an eccentric old woman, a contemporary artist, and a trouser-wearing angel.

=== Naufrage ===
Naufrage was published in French in 2023 and was longlisted for the 2023 Prix Goncourt. The English translation by Helen Stevenson, Small Boat, was published in 2025 and was shortlisted for the International Booker Prize. It also won an English PEN Translates award. It is the first of his novels to be translated into English.

The book was written in three weeks, and is based on the November 2021 English Channel disaster, in which 28 people died when an inflatable dinghy carrying migrants from France to the United Kingdom capsized. The French authorities received calls for help, but insisted that the boat was in British waters and that the British authorities must respond. Delecroix's book is narrated by the radio operator who took the calls for help, and who refuses to be held more responsible than all the other factors that have contributed to the event. The Times Literary Supplement described it as "vividly translated" and "painful, compelling and mercifully short, with a powerful undertow".

Delecroix has said of the book that it is "a fiction that tries to imagine how someone with no evil in her, who is just anybody, can act and talk in such an inhuman manner and become a striking example of the so-called 'banality of evil', as Hannah Arendt put it."

== Bibliography ==
=== Philosophy ===
- 2005: Post-scriptum aux Miettes philosophiques. Kierkegaard, Ellipses (Philo-textes)
- 2006: Singulière philosophie. Essai sur Kierkegaard, Félin (series "les marches du temps")
- 2012: Petit éloge de l'ironie, Gallimard
- 2012: Chanter. Reprendre la parole, Flammarion (series "Sens propre")
- 2015: Ce n'est point ici le pays de la vérité, Félin ("les marches du temps")
- 2015: Poussin : une journée en Arcadie, Groupe Flammarion
- 2015: (with Philippe Forest) Le Deuil: entre le chagrin et le néant, Gallimard (Folio)
- 2016: Apocalypse du politique, Desclée De Brouwer
- 2017: Non! de l'esprit de révolte, Autrement
- 2019: Apprendre à perdre, Bibliothèque Rivages

=== Novels and short stories ===
- 2003: Retour à Bruxelles, Actes Sud (series "Un endroit où aller")
- 2004: À la porte, Éditions Gallimard (series "Blanche")
- 2004: La Preuve de l'existence de Dieu, Actes Sud ("Un endroit où aller")
- 2006: Ce qui est perdu, Gallimard ("Blanche"), Prix Valery Larbaud
- 2007: La chaussure sur le toit, Gallimard ("Blanche")
- 2008: Tombeau d'Achille, Gallimard ("L'un et l'autre"), Grand prix de littérature de l'Académie française
- 2017 Ascension, Gallimard ("Blanche")
- 2023 Naufrage, Gallimard ("Blanche")

=== As contributor ===
- 2004: La Bible. Héros et légendes de l'Ancien Testament, Paris, Larousse (Junior)
- 2010: Lexique nomade, Paris, Christian Bourgois
- 2011: Cartographie de l'Utopie : l'œuvre indisciplinée de Michael Löwy
- 2012: Noël, quel bonheur ! Treize nouvelles affreusement croustillantes, Paris, Armand Colin
- 2012: Petite bibliothèque du chanteur, Paris, Flammarion, series "Champs Classiques, presented by V. Delecroix.
- Décapage (revue), regular contributor

=== Translations and prefaces ===
- 2006: Søren Kierkegaard, Exercice en christianisme, Paris, Félin, series "Les marches du temps", transl. from Danish.
- 2009: Stendhal, La Chartreuse de Parme, Paris, Flammarion, series "GF", with an interview by V. Delecroix: Pourquoi aimez-vous La Chartreuse de Parme ?
- 2012: Sigmund Freud, Religion, Paris, Gallimard, series "Connaissance de l'inconscient", preface by V. Delecroix.
