= Rafaël Pividal =

French writer and philosopher

Rafaël Pividal (born 1934 near Buenos Aires – 2 October 2006) was a French writer and philosopher.

== Biography ==
Rafaël Pividal was the son of a French mother, a classical dancer, and an Argentinean father, a lawyer. Rafael's maternal grandmother was a well-known actress, Germaine Dermoz (1888–1966).

At the death of his father in 1944, Rafael and his mother found themselves in a great poverty. From the age of 14, he must give private lessons to earn a little money.

He attended secondary school in Buenos Aires and passed a French baccalaureate (1952); He then went to France to study philosophy. A student at the Sorbonne, he was part of a group which included Gabriel Cohn-Bendit, Lucien Sebag and Pierre Clastres. He was admitted at the agrégation of philosophy in 1959.

From 1964, he taught sociology of art at the Sorbonne. He supported his doctoral thesis (sociology) in 1995 and was thereafter habilited to direct thesis.

In parallel to his teaching, Rafaël Pividal was successively a member of the editorial boards of the Exit and Roman magazines and wrote numerous books.

== Works ==
Doctoral thesis

- 1995:De la logique narrative, ou du sens et de la fonction de la fiction, Université Paris 5, under the direction of André Akoun

Fiction and essais

- 1963: Une paix bien intéressante, Éditions du Seuil
- 1969: Tentative de visite à une base étrangère, Seuil
- 1970: Plus de quartier pour Paris, Seuil
- 1972: Le Capitaine Nemo et la science, Éditions Grasset
- 1974: Émily et une nuit, Seuil
- 1976: La Maison de l’écriture, Seuil
- 1977: Pays sages, Rupture
- 1978: Le Mensonge - Chronique des années de crise, Ed. Encres, ISBN 9782862220055
- 1978: La Tête de Louis XVI, Rupture
- 1978: Un professeur d’américain, Éditions Balland
- 1989: Le Pré-joli, Balland.
- 1980: Le Faux-prêtre, Presses de la Renaissance
- 1981: La Découverte de l’Amérique, Grasset
- 1985: La Montagne fêlée, Grasset
- 1986: Grotius, Grasset, (Prix Sainte-Beuve).
- 1989: Hugo, l’enterré vivant, Presses de la Renaissance
- 1989: Le Petit Marcel, Grasset
- 1991: Le Goût de la catastrophe, Presses de la Renaissance
- 1992: Les Aventures ordinaires de Jacques Lamare, Quai Voltaire
- 1993: 1994, Robert Laffont

== Filmography ==
- 1992 - Hector Guimard, un architecte et ses folies. by Pascal Kané: himself.
