= Bernard Delvaille =

French poet, essayist, translator and anthologist

- Born: 1 December 1931; Bordeaux, France
- Died: 18 April 2006 (aged 74); Venice, Italy
- Occupations: Poet, essayist, translator and anthologist.

Bernard Delvaille (1 December 1931 – 18 April 2006) was a French poet, essayist, translator and anthologist.

A graduate from the Institut d’Études Politiques, he entered the publishing business in the early 1950s as a reader for Éditions Denoël, before collaborating with Éditions Seghers in 1956, where he did various editorial work. From 1962 on, he worked with Pierre Seghers on the collection "Poètes d'aujourd'hui" until Robert Laffont bought the editions in 1969. He then managed the collection until 1989.

His involvement in publishing was reinforced by his participation in the Centre national des Lettres from 1975 to 1983 in the commissions "Poésie" and "Revue". His literary knowledge led him to become a literary critic and give lectures for the Alliances Françaises and in several universities like Brussels, Lisbon, Rome or Toronto. In addition to these oratorical exercises, he was the author of numerous articles in magazines such as Combat, Les Nouvelles Littéraires, Les Lettres Françaises, Le Figaro Littéraire, Le Magazine Littéraire and La Revue des Deux Mondes. Finally, he was one of the juries of the Prix Guillaume Apollinaire and the Prix Max Jacob, was a member of the Académie Mallarmé and held the post of President of the "Association internationale des Amis de Valery Larbaud". He won the Prix Valery Larbaud in 1985 for his entire body of work.

His first book was devoted to Valery Larbaud and awarded the prix Sainte-Beuve in 1963. This work was followed by other studies on Johannes Brahms, Samuel Taylor Coleridge, Théophile Gautier, Paul Morand and Mathieu Bénézet, where one could notice an attraction for the romanticism and modernity of the early twentieth century. In addition to these monographs, his work was distinguished as that of an anthologist, since he was the author of three works that have become classics and hailed as such by critics: La Poésie symboliste (Bernard Delvaille will be rewarded with the Prix Henri-Mondor in 1983 for his work on symbolism and Mallarmé), La Nouvelle poésie française, which drew up an inventory of poetic hopes in the mid-1970s and Mille et cent ans de poésie française, a sum of more than a thousand pages listing the great poets from the eleventh to the mid-twentieth.

Delvaille was the author of a poetic work published in 2006 in which he developed the themes of journey, wandering, happiness and death.

== Poetry ==
- 1951: Blues, Paris, éditions Escales
- 1955: Train de vie, Paris, éditions Paragraphes
- 1957: Enfance, mon amour, Rodez, éditions Subervie
- 1958: Tout objet aimé est le centre d’un paradis, Paris, éditions Millas-Martin
- 1967: Désordre, Seghers
- 1976: Faits divers, Seghers
- 1978: Le Vague à l’âme de la Royal Navy, Paris, La Répétition
- 1980: Blanche est l’écharpe d’Yseut, Mont-de-Marsan, Cahiers des Brisants
- 1980: La Dernière légende lyrique, Mauregny-en-Haye, Cahiers de Mauregny
- 1982: Poèmes (1951–1981), Seghers
- 1989: Panicauts ou le voyage d'été, Vitry-sur-Seine, éditions Monologue
- 2006: Œuvre poétique, Paris, La Table ronde, ISBN 271032847X

== Stories, novels, diary ==
- 1971: La Saison perdue, Paris, Éditions Gallimard
- 1982: Les Derniers outrages, Paris, Flammarion, ISBN 2080644084
- 1988: Séparés, on est ensemble, followed by Le Plus Secret Amour, Montpellier, Fata Morgana
- 1989: Le Plaisir solitaire, 1st ed., Paris, Le Temps qu'il fait, 2005 ISBN 2868534317
- 1995: Le Temps provisoire, Paris, Salvy, ISBN 2905899565
- 2000: Journal, tome 1 : 1942-1962, La Table Ronde
- 2001: Journal, tome 2 : 1963-1977, La Table ronde, ISBN 2710323982
- 2003: Journal, tome 3 : 1978-1999, La Table ronde, ISBN 271032542X

== Essays ==
- 1963: Essai sur Valery Larbaud, Seghers
- 1963: Coleridge, Seghers
- 1965: Johannes Brahms, Seghers
- 1966: Paul Morand, Seghers
- 1968: Théophile Gautier, Seghers. Reprint Rouen, tirages limités, 2003 ISBN 2915386005
- 1980: Paris, ses poètes, ses chansons, Paris, Robert Laffont
- 1981: Le Piéton de Paris. Passages et galeries du 19e siècle, with photos by Robert Doisneau, Paris, éditions ACE
- 1983: Londres, Seyssel, Champ Vallon
- 1984: Mathieu Bénézet, Paris
- 1985: Bordeaux, Seyssel, Champ Vallon
- 2004: Pages sur le livre, Paris, Éditions des Cendres
- 2006: Duchamp libre, Paris, L'Échoppe
- 2007: Vies parallèles de Blaise Cendrars & de Charles-Albert Cingria, Paris, La Bibliothèque

== Anthologies ==
- 1971: La Poésie symboliste, Seghers
- 1974: La Nouvelle poésie française, Seghers
- 1991: Mille et cent ans de poésie française, Paris, Robert Laffont, Bouquins, ISBN 2221059824
- 2004: Le Goût de Londres, Paris, Mercure de France, ISBN 2715224591
