= Julia Billet =

French novelist and poet

Julia Billet (born 1962, Paris) is a French writer, novelist, and author of short stories and poetry.

== Publications ==
Julia Billet has published novels, children's books, collections of short stories and poetry collections:

- J'ai mal à mon écorce, album illustrated by Ana Aranda
- Le mystère de la chambre froide, comic strip, with Simon Bailly
- Chambre d'ombre, art book, photographs by Patrick Jacques, illustrated by Cyril Dominger, 2016 (ISBN 9791092353280)
- Cris de guerres (reprints), le Mot fou éditions, 2016 ( ISBN 9782918401032)
- Vivre Livre, a collection of short stories, illustrated by Hélène Humbert, 2016
- 1+1=1 double album reprint, illustrated by Clémence Dupont, 2016
- Salle des pas perdus, album, 2015
- Alors partir, (eprint in series, 2015 (ISBN 9783125923096)
- Corps et graphie, récit d'ateliers d'écriture à France Alzheimer, October 2015
- MO, graphic novel, illustrated by Simon BBailly, September 2015 ISBN 979-10-92353-17-4
- Du vent dans les ailes/un potager qui en sait long, double album, October 2014 ISBN 979-10-92353-13-6
- A suivre, short story, February 2014 ISBN 978-2-916597-73-7
- 1+1=1 album, 2013 ISBN 979-10-92353-09-9
- Promesses, short stories, June 2013 ISBN 979-10-90685-22-2
- Tu, novel, October 2012 ISBN 978-2-916597-55-3
- Une bonne nouvelle, album, from the series "Ti lecteurs", June 2012 ISBN 978-2-36247-043-1
- La guerre de Catherine, novel, first published April 2012, republished as Catherine's War in the US in 2020 ISBN 978-2-211-20728-7
- Petites histoires de quartiers, short stories, October 2010 ISBN 978-2-916533-99-5, short stories published with the help of the Observatoire des inégalités
- T'es qui, toi ?, album, Motus Éditions, September 2010 ISBN 2-36011-011-X
- Sayonara samouraï, novel, Le Seuil, May 2009 ISBN 978-2-02-106220-5 and ISBN 978-2-02-099714-0
- Alors, partir ?, novel, Le Seuil, March 2008 ISBN 978-2-02-097287-1
- Pourquoi c'est toujours moi qui ?, album, in collaboration with Nana Margabim, November 2007 ISBN 978-2-916533-27-8
- Le fil invisible, short story, in collaboration with Sandrine Martin and Anne-Catherine Boudet, June 2007 ISBN 9782351310526
- Noémie lit et crie, album, May 2007 ISBN 978-2-907354-74-5
- Je n'oublierai pas, album, July 2006 ISBN 2-907354-67-1
- Salle des pas perdus, audiobook edition, 2015 ISBN 2-211-06751-4,
- De silences et de glace, novel, March 2002 ISBN 2-211-06367-5
- Cris de guerres, short stories, August 2000 ISBN 2-911406-76-1
- J'ai oublié, novel, August 1998 ISBN 2-911406-46-X

Short stories

Collective works published with Le Castor Astral and Tu connais la nouvelle:

- Petite
- Yé cric, bis repetita, in Etranger (2007)
- Les mariés, in Bleu (2008)
- Le photographe, in Chut (2008)
- La vie devant soi dans la mallette pédagogique published by the Observatoire des inégalités (2012)

Short stories and poetry

in journals:

- Cahier du débord, short story, in the journal Le préau des collines (2002)
- Des poèmes extraits d’un recueil "Tracé", in the journal Lieux d’être (2005)
- De vous à moi, poems, in Littera, (2007)

Artists' books

- Maison, created then illustrated by painter Youl, (2004)
- Les petits toits du Monde, collective collection of texts around writing (with Louise Warren, Jean Louis Giovannoni, Arno Bertina, Ludovic Degroote)

Coordination et direction artistique d'ouvrages

- Caracolavie et autres poèmes in collaboration with Esther Puifhouloux and Juliette Rahban (album) and a group of children and adults from the city of Contrexéville
- L'écrivantaire, récit d'expériences d'ateliers d'écriture, with a professional collective of social and cultural figures, illustrated by Amina Bouajila

== Prizes and honours ==
- Prix Tapage 2014, for La guerre de Catherine
- Prix 12/14 de Brive-la-Gaillarde 2008 for Alors, partir ?
- Prix Marguerite Audoux des collégiens en 2006 for Salle des pas perdus
- Prix Sainte-Beuve des collégiens, 2011 for Sayonara samourai
- Numerous selections for la guerre de Catherine ( sur les Prix des dévoreurs de livres 2013, prix des 25H du Mans 2013 Enlivrez vous May 2013, Prix de laudeac 2013, prix Mort de lire de Poissy 2013, Prix farniente 2014) Sayonara Samourai (sur les prix des dévoreurs 2009/2010, Festilivre Nord 2011, Prix Sainte Beuve des collégiens 2011, prix de la ville de Cherbourg-Octeville 2011, prix Tapage Rezé 2014), for Alors, partir ? (sur les prix des lycéens allemands, prix des villes de Tarbes, de Villefranche de Rouergue, de Narbonne, du Mans) and for Salle des pas perdus (sur les Prix Chronos, Prix littéraire des Vosges du jeune lecteur, prix Ruralivre Nord pas de Calais, prix du lecteur jeunesse à Narbonne, Villefranche de Rouergue, les 24h du livre du Mans, prix Farniente en Belgique, prix jeunesse du Haut Rhin, Lire en Seine, prix des collégiens de Haute-Savoie, prix Sésame de St Paul 3 Châteaux, prix de la ville de Mont-de-Marsan)
- Julia Billet was a guest at the Berlin International Literature Festival 2010
