= Roger Vrigny =

French writer (1920–1997)

Roger Vrigny (French pronunciation: [ʁɔʒe vʁiɲi]; 19 May 1920, Paris – 16 August 1997, Lille) was a 20th-century French writer.

== Biography ==
A professor, Roger Vrigny turned to theatre in 1950 by founding a small theatre company, "La Compagnie du Miroir", before devoting himself to literature with his first novel, Arban, in 1954. He began his literary career under the mentorship of the writer and poet Robert Mallet. He was also a radio broadcaster, hosting the program Belles Lettres on the ORTF in 1955, then Matinée littéraire on France Culture from 1966. For thirty years, he hosted various literary programs, the last of which was "Lettres Ouvertes", broadcast every Wednesday on France Culture. He was a member of the jury of the Prix Renaudot. Vrigny continued working as a novelist, essayist and publisher, and his work was marked by discretion and high standards.

In 1963, he won the Prix Femina for La Nuit de Mougins, and in 1989 he received the Grand prix de littérature de l'Académie française for his lifetime achievement.

His final published work, Instants dérobés (Éditions Gallimard, 1996), was composed of extracts from the diary he kept between 1972 and 1991.

He died aged 77. He is buried in Picardy, in his adopted village of Wiry-au-Mont.

== Works ==
- 1954: Arban, Gallimard
- 1956: Lauréna, Gallimard
- 1958: Barbégal, Gallimard
- 1963: La Nuit de Mougins, Prix Femina
- 1968: Fin de journée, Gallimard
- 1972: La vie brève, Gallimard
- 1974: Pourquoi cette joie ?, Gallimard
- 1979: Un ange passe, Gallimard
- 1983: Sentiments distingués, Éditions Grasset, Prix Dumas-Millier of the Académie française
- 1985: Accident de parcours, followed by Amour and Une tache sur la vitre, Gallimard
- 1988: Le bonhomme d'Ampère, Gallimard
- 1989: Sang Indien et autres nouvelles (Roger Vrigny wrote the preface of this collection) (La Découverte / Le Monde) Prix du jeune écrivain 1989.
- 1990: Les Cœurs sensibles, Gallimard
- 1990: Le besoin d'écrire, Grasset
- 1990: La Confession de Rousseau (theatre), Editions Actes Sud-Papiers
- 1994: Le Garçon d’orage, Gallimard
- 1996: Instants dérobés, Gallimard
- 1998: Ciel de lit et autres nouvelles, Mercure de France, collective work including texts by Roger Vrigny, Olivier Balazuc, François-Xavier Molia, Rodolfo Pinto...

== Adaptations ==
- 1983: La Métamorphose by Jean-Daniel Verhaeghe after Franz Kafka
- 1989: L'Or du diable
- 1996: Roger Vrigny's novel Le Garçon d’orage was adapted for television by Jérôme Foulon with
  - Daniel Russo as Marcellin
  - Vincent Lecœur as Willie
  - Véronique Silver as Germaine
  - François Berléand as Le Boîteux

== Script ==
- 1999: Je suis vivante et je vous aime by Roger Kahane
