= Grand Prix de Littérature de l'Académie française =

French literary award

The Grand prix de littérature de l'Académie française is a French literary award, established in 1911 by the Académie française. It goes to an author for their entire body of work. Originally an annual prize, it has since 1979 been handed out every second year, alternately with the Grand prix de littérature Paul-Morand.

== Laureates ==
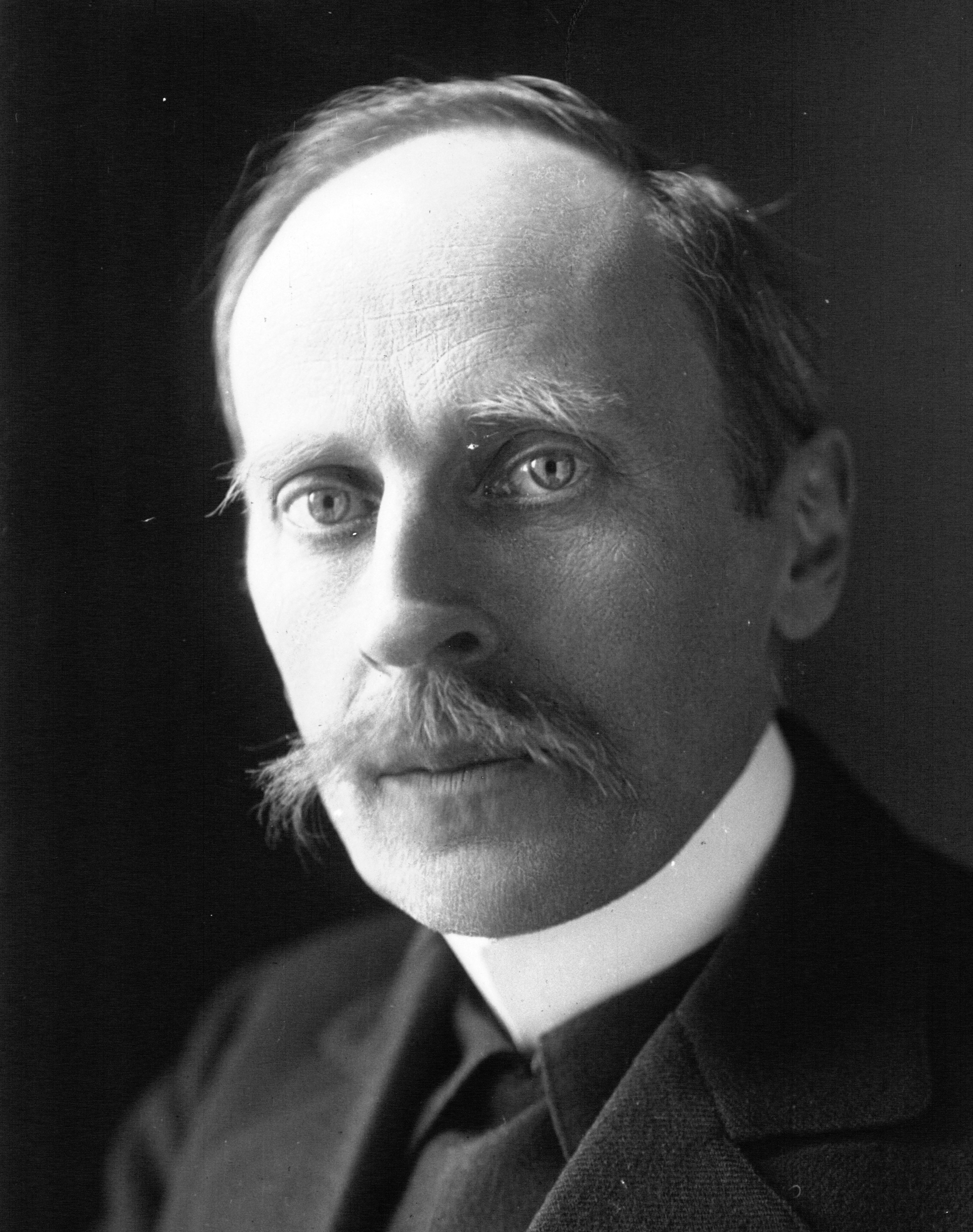
Romain Rolland, recipient in 1913

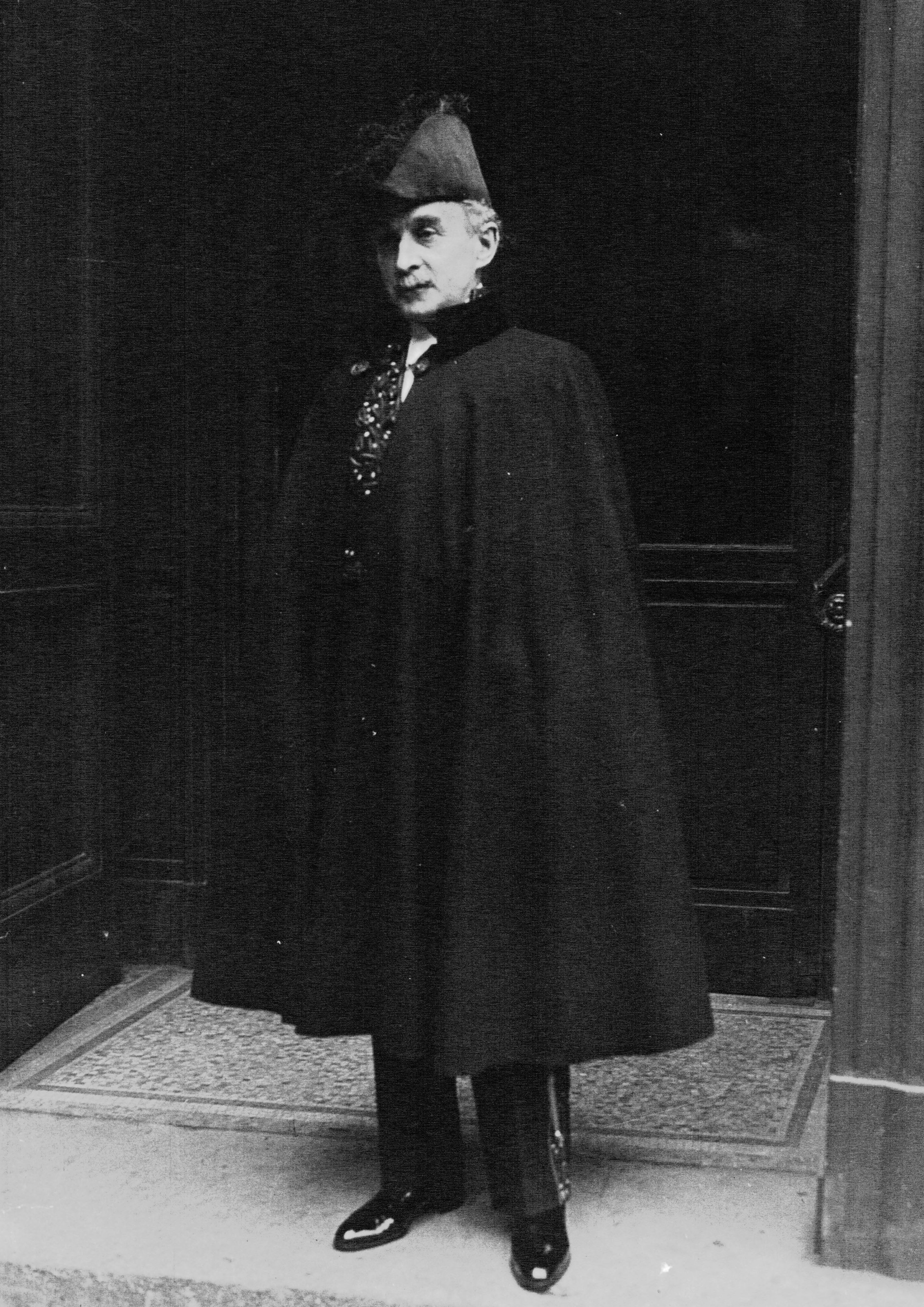
Abel Bonnard, recipient in 1924

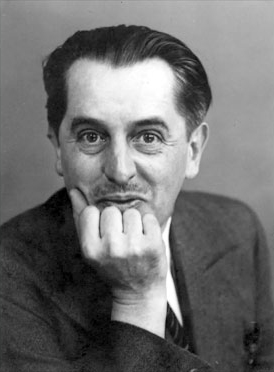
Jean Paulhan, recipient in 1945

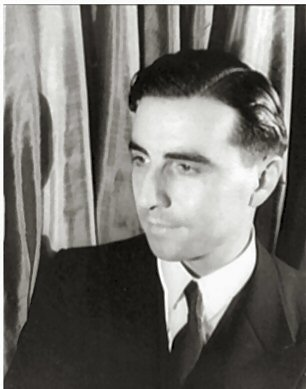
Julien Green, recipient in 1970

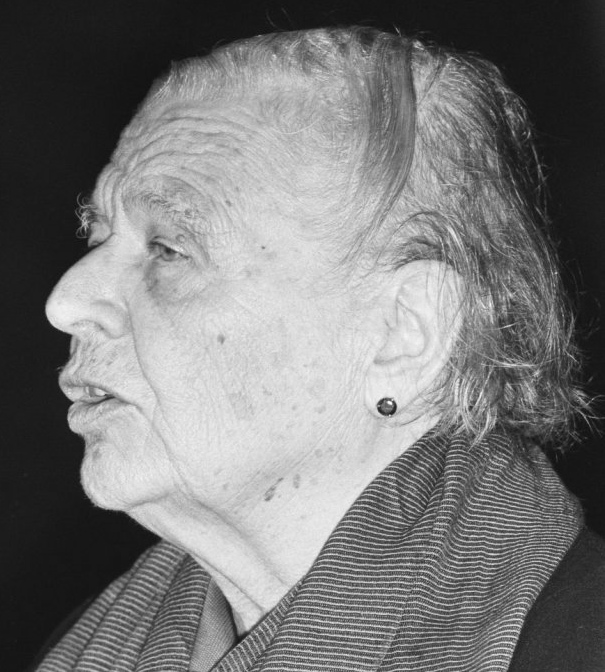
Marguerite Yourcenar, recipient in 1977

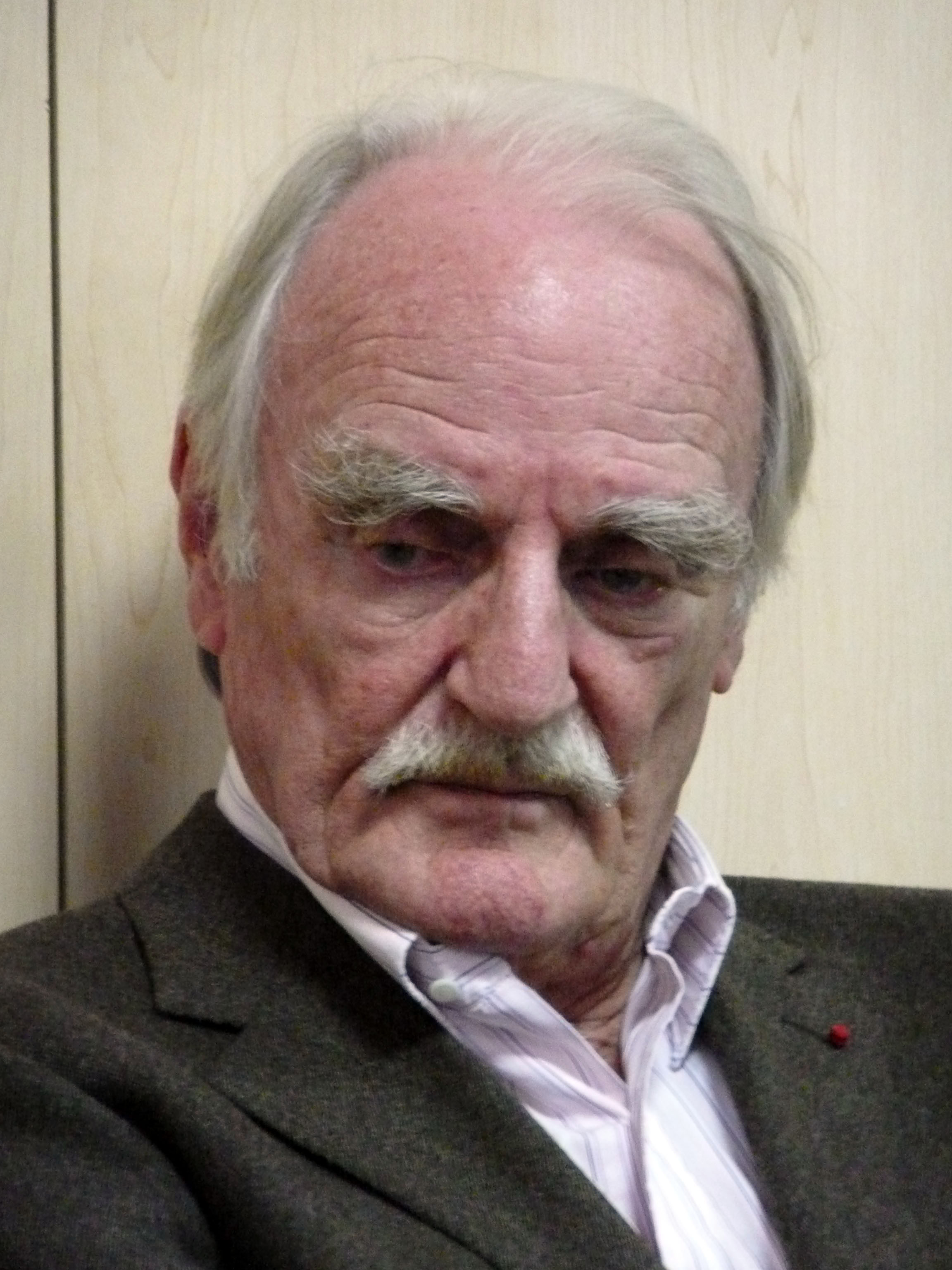
Jean Raspail, recipient in 2003

- 1912: André Lafon
- 1913: Romain Rolland
- 1915: Émile Nolly
- 1916: Pierre-Maurice Masson
- 1917: Francis Jammes
- 1918: Gérard d'Houville
- 1919: Jean and Jérôme Tharaud
- 1920: Edmond Jaloux
- 1921: Anna de Noailles
- 1922: Pierre Lasserre
- 1923: François Porché
- 1924: Abel Bonnard
- 1925: E. Mangin
- 1926: Gilbert de Voisins
- 1927: Joseph de Pesquidoux
- 1928: Jean-Louis Vaudoyer
- 1929: Henri Massis
- 1930: Marie-Louise Pailleron
- 1931: Raymond Escholier
- 1932: Franc-Nohain
- 1933: Henri Duvernois
- 1934: Henry de Montherlant
- 1935: André Suarès
- 1936: Pierre Camo
- 1937: Maurice Magre
- 1938: Tristan Derème
- 1939: Jacques Boulenger
- 1940: Edmond Pilon
- 1941: Gabriel Faure
- 1942: Jean Schlumberger
- 1943: Jean Prévost
- 1944: André Billy
- 1945: Jean Paulhan
- 1946: Daniel-Rops
- 1947: Mario Meunier
- 1948: Gabriel Marcel
- 1949: Maurice Levaillant
- 1950: Marc Chadourne
- 1951: Henri Martineau
- 1952: Marcel Arland
- 1953: Marcel Brion
- 1954: Jean Guitton
- 1955: Jules Supervielle
- 1956: Henri Clouard
- 1958: Jules Roy
- 1959: Thierry Maulnier
- 1960: Simone Le Bargy
- 1961: Jacques Maritain
- 1962: Luc Estang
- 1963: Charles Vildrac
- 1964: Gustave Thibon
- 1965: Henri Petit
- 1966: Henri Gouhier
- 1967: Emmanuel Berl
- 1968: Henri Bosco
- 1969: Pierre Gascar
- 1970: Julien Green
- 1971: Georges-Emmanuel Clancier
- 1972: Jean-Louis Curtis
- 1973: Louis Guilloux
- 1974: André Dhôtel
- 1975: Henri Queffélec
- 1976: José Cabanis
- 1977: Marguerite Yourcenar
- 1978: Paul Guth
- 1979: Antoine Blondin
- 1981: Jacques Laurent
- 1983: Michel Mohrt
- 1985: Roger Grenier
- 1987: Jacques Brosse
- 1989: Roger Vrigny
- 1991: Jacques Lacarrière
- 1993: Louis Nucéra
- 1995: Jacques Brenner
- 1997: Béatrix Beck
- 1999: André Brincourt
- 2001: Milan Kundera
- 2003: Jean Raspail
- 2005: Danièle Sallenave
- 2007: Michel Chaillou
- 2009: Vincent Delecroix
- 2011: Jean-Bertrand Pontalis
- 2013: Michel Butor
- 2015: Laurence Cossé
- 2017: Charles Juliet
- 2019: Régis Debray
- 2021: Patrick Deville
- 2023 : Daniel Pennac
- 2025 : Michel Bernard
