= Jean-Louis Curtis =

French novelist

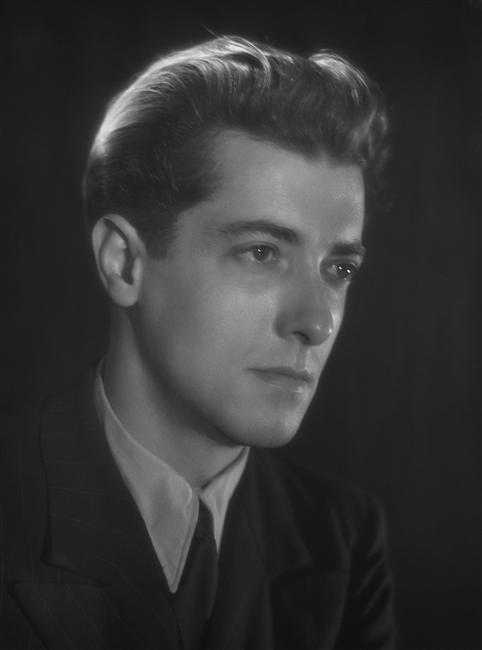
Jean-Louis Curtis 1947, photo by Studio Harcourt.

Jean-Louis Curtis (22 May 1917 – 11 November 1995), pseudonym of Albert Laffitte, was a French novelist best known for his second novel The Forests of the Night (French: Les Forêts de la nuit), which won France's highest literary award the Prix Goncourt in 1947. He is the author of over 30 novels.

== Life ==
Curtis was born in Orthez, Pyrénées-Atlantiques. He attended the Bordeaux Faculty of Arts after secondary studies in his hometown. He then became a student at the Sorbonne before traveling to England from September 1937 to July 1939. In August 1939, he was mobilized as part of the Air Force from January 1940. He transferred to Morocco in May 1940. At the end of September 1940, he demobilized and returned to France and taught at the lycée de Bayonne. He passed the agrégation exam in English with success in 1943. He then taught as an English professor at the lycée de Laon. In August 1944, he took part in the Corps franc Pommiès, the campaign for the liberation of France.

In 1946, he published his first novel, Les Jeunes Hommes. In 1947, he won the Prix Goncourt for his novel Les Forêts de la nuit. He was one of the founders in 1948 of the literary monthly La Table Ronde. In 1955, he left teaching to devote himself to writing. From 1963 to 1972, he was a member of the Advance Revenue Commission at the National Film Center. In 1972, he received the Grand prix de littérature de l'Académie française for all of his work. As a specialist in Shakespeare, he was responsible for the French subtitling of television adaptations of plays by the English playwright, produced by the BBC between 1978 and 1985, and broadcast in France in the mid-1980s. He was elected a member of the Académie française in 1986. He has written several collections of pastiches on contemporary events such as the student revolts of May 1968 and the socialist victory in France in May 1981.

Martin Seymour-Smith said of Curtis in the early 1980s:

He is one of the best of the 'conventional' novelists now writing in France, but is very uneven: he is not worried about originality of technique, and prefers to concentrate on what he can do well, which is to anatomize bourgeois societies and 'artistic' communities.

The author Michel Houellebecq made a homage to him in a long passage in La carte et le territoire (prix Goncourt 2010).

== Works ==
- Les Jeunes hommes (1946)
- Les Forets de la nuit (1947; The Forests of the Night) – "acid portraits of those who played at being members of the Resistance" Winner of the Prix Goncourt 1947.
- Gibier de Potence (1949; Lucifer's Dream) – "an acid picture of postwar Paris".
- Haute École (1950)
- Chers corbeaux (1951) – "targets the Parisian bourgeoisie who had done well out of the Nazi occupation"
- Les Justes Causes (1954; The Side of the Angels) – about the liberation of Paris.
- L'Échelle de soie (1956)
- Un Saint au néon (1956)
- La Parade (1960) – "a devastating satire on rich old provincial upper-class drones".
- Cygne sauvage (1962)
- La Quarantaine (1966)
- Le Jeune couple (1967) – "dealt with the splendours<sic> and miseries of .. 'consumer society'".
- Le Thé sous les cyprès (1969)
- Un miroir le long du chemin (1969)
- Le Roseau pensant (1971)
- La Chine m'inquiète (1972)
- Questions à la littérature (1973)
- L'Étage noble (1976)
- L'Horizon dérobé (1978)
- La Moitié du chemin (1980) – Volume 2 of L'Horizon dérobé
- Le Battement de mon cœur (1981) – Volume 3 of L'Horizon dérobé
- Le Mauvais choix (1984) – "attacked Christian bigotry. It is his only historical novel, set in the third century AD."
- Le Temple de l'amour (1990)
- La France m'épuise (1992)
- Le monde comme il va (1995)
- Andromède (1996)
