= Laurence Cossé =

French writer (born 1950)

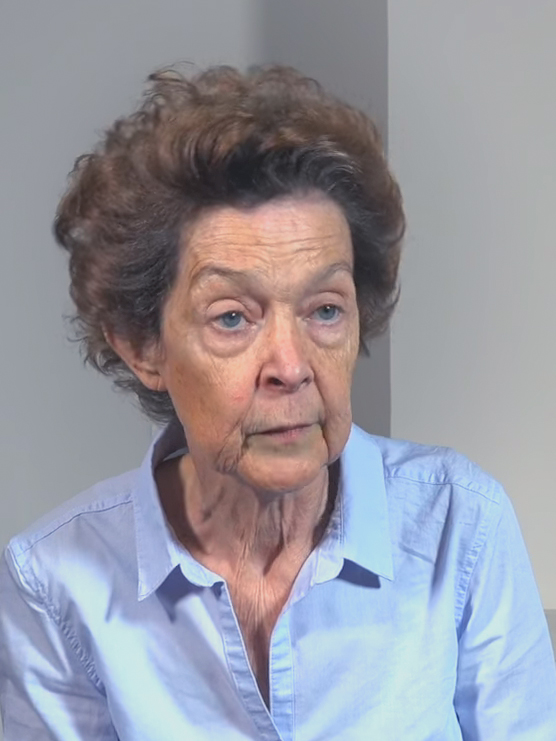
Laurence Cossé (2018)

Laurence Cossé (born 1950 in Boulogne-Billancourt, France) is a French writer, who published mainly novels.

She was first a journalist in the French newspaper Le Quotidien de Paris and then at the French public radio France Culture. Most of her novels were published by the French publishing house Gallimard. Her most famous novel to date, Le Coin du voile (1996), was translated as A Corner of the veil in American English (as well as in five other languages).

Although she published one poetic novel (Les Chambres du Sud) and one historical novel (La Femme du premier ministre), most of her latest novels evoke the contemporary French society, often in a critical or ironical manner. She received in 2015 the "Grand Prix de littérature" of the Académie Française.

Her 2016 novel La Grande Arche was adapted by Stéphane Demoustier into the 2025 drama film The Great Arch (L'Inconnu du Grande Arche).

== Works ==
- Novels
  - Les Chambres du Sud, Gallimard, 1981
  - Le Premier pas d'amante, Gallimard, 1983
  - 18h35 : Grand Bonheur, Le Seuil, 1991
  - Un Frère, Le Seuil, 1994
  - Le Coin du voile, Gallimard, 1996 (received the "Prix du Jury Jean Giono 1996"); American translation by Linda Asher:
    - Cossé, Laurence (1999). A corner of the veil. New York, NY: Scribner. ISBN 978-0-684-84667-5. OCLC 40298474.
  - La Femme du premier ministre, Gallimard, 1998
  - Le Mobilier national, Gallimard, 2001
  - Le 31 du mois d'août, Gallimard, 2003; in English Accident in August (Europa Editions, 2011)
  - Au bon roman, Gallimard, 2009; in English, A Novel Bookstore (Europa Editions, 2010)
  - Les Amandes amères, Gallimard, 2011; in English, Bitter Almonds (Europa Editions, 2013)
  - La Grande Arche, Gallimard, 2016
  - Nuit sur la neige, Gallimard, 2018
  - Le secret de Sybil, Gallimard, 2023
- Short stories
  - Vous n'écrivez plus ?, Gallimard, 2006 (received the "Grand Prix de la nouvelle de l'Académie Française″)
- Theater
  - La Terre des Folles, published with Monseigneur de Très-Haut, HB éditions, 1995 (with illustrations by Christine Lesueur)
