= Jean Malaquais =

French novelist

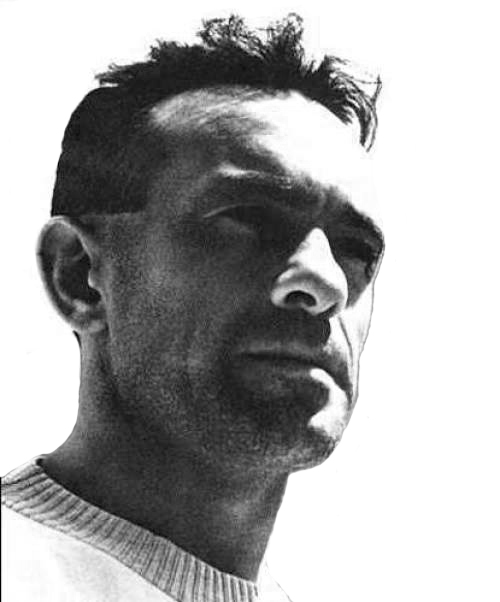
Jean Malaquais in Mexico

Jean Malaquais (1908 – 22 December 1998) was a French novelist. He was born as Wladimir Jan Pavel Malacki in Warsaw in 1908 of a non-religious Polish family of Jewish descent.

In 1926, he left Poland, travelling in Eastern Europe and the Middle East; he wrote: "I had the feeling that the end of the world was approaching in Poland, so I wanted to discover the life of other lands before it disappeared entirely. Morally and intellectually I was a tramp, a companion of the dispossessed." He settled in France, where he worked as a labourer, and adopted the name of Jean Malaquais (which he took from the Quai Malaquais). He was associated with, though not formally a member of, several French leftist organizations, including the Trotskyist Communist League, and during the Spanish Civil War he joined the Republican forces as a member of the militia columns of the left Workers' Party of Marxist Unification (POUM). He obtained the Prix Renaudot in 1939 for his novel Les Javanais, based on his experience as an immigrant mine worker in Provence; it was admired by André Gide, who made Malaquais his private secretary.

At the beginning of World War II, he was conscripted into the French army, though not a French citizen. He was captured by the Wehrmacht, but managed to escape, and fled to southern France. In 1943, he succeeded in leaving France with the assistance of Varian Fry and the Emergency Rescue Committee bound for Mexico, and, eventually the United States, where he became a naturalised citizen; his parents died in Nazi Germany concentration camps. He returned to France in 1947, but left again for the United States in 1948. (Beginning in 1942 and continuing after the war, he was a member of the Left Communist group Gauche communiste de France; in the United States, he was loosely affiliated with several non-Communist left groups.) His most famous work, about an international group of exiles in Vichy France, was Planète sans visa (1947), which has been translated into many languages.

== Major works ==
- Les Javanais, Éditions Denoël, Paris (1939); translated as The Men From Java (1941)
- Journal de guerre, Éditions de la maison française, New York, 1943
- "Deux nouvelles de Jean Malaquais", in Les œuvres nouvelles 2, Éditions de la maison française, New York, 1943.
- Coups de barre, récits, Éditions de la maison française, New York, 1944.
- Planète sans visa, Le pré aux clercs, Paris (1947); translated as World Without Visa (1949).
- Le Gaffeur, Buchet/Chastel, Paris (1953); translated as The Joker (1953).
- Søren Kierkegaard: Foi et Paradoxe, 10/18, UGE, Paris, 1971.
- "Le Nommé Louis Aragon ou le patriote professionnel", Masses, février 1947, repr. in Les archipels du surréalisme, Éditions Syllepse, 1998.
- Correspondance (1935–1950) by André Gide and Jean Malaquais, Éditions Phébus, Paris, 2000.

== Translations ==
- Les Nus et les morts, tr. of Norman Mailer, The Naked and the Dead.
- Occultisme, sorcellerie et modes culturelles, tr. of Mircea Eliade, Ocultism, witchcraft and cultural fashions.
