= The Forests of the Night =

The Forests of the Night (1947; French: Les Forêts de la nuit) is the second novel by French author Jean-Louis Curtis. His best-selling novel, it is also considered his best, winning the 1947 Prix Goncourt, France's most prestigious literary prize. Set in Curtis's native region of Pyrénées-Atlantiques, the novel is the story of a village under Nazi occupation, centering on the fortunes of French resistors and collaborators.

== History ==
The novel's historical context is that during the years immediately after the war, a myth in France arose that most Frenchmen had been resistors to the Nazi occupation, fighters who took up arms or committed acts of civil disobedience and noncooperation. They were opposed by a few collaborators, or bad apples, who supported the occupation. The mythology of a nation of resistors would be seriously discredited and revised in the early 1970s through the work of historian Robert Paxton, but Jean-Louis Curtis's 1947 novel was one of the first to raise some doubts, to expose cracks in the lie, thus winning it the attention of France's literary establishment and earning it the Prix Goncourt. The Forests of the Night was the first post-war novel to portray France during the war as it really was, as James Kirkup observed, an "acid portrait of those who played at being members of the [French] Resistance".

The novel's theme and title come from the opening lines to William Blake's poem "The Tyger": "Tiger, tiger, burning bright - in the forests of the night."

The Forests of the Night was translated by Nora Wydenbruck into English in 1951; it has not been re-printed since.

== Plot ==
Francis is the son of the Comte de Balansun, whose family resides in the French town of Saint-Clar, near the Pyrenees. Francis, in the beginning of the novel, skips school and helps a refugee called "The Mohican" escape to the Free Zone in Spain during the German Occupation of France. Before he departs, the "Mohican" promises Francis to inform Jean, the fiancé engaged to Francis' sister, Helene, and who had escaped through Spain to England. Afterwards, Francis informs his father that he has joined the French Resistance, and the Comte de Balansun, who is initially supportive of Marechal Petain, is then moved by his son's actions and declares his support for the Resistance. Francis tells his acquaintance, Philip Arreguy, to inform his sister Helene the next time he visits Paris, and let her know that he has tried to get a message across to her fiancee Jean. In the process Francis also reveals to Philip that he is part of the Resistance.

Helene is living in Paris, having graduated from studies in physics and chemistry. An admirer named Gerard who frequently spends evenings with her longs for her to be his lover, but out of respect for her engagement, as well as her intelligence, virtue, and position, he decides to remain as a friend. Helene grows tired of waiting for Jean and succumbs to the sensual attentions of Philip, who becomes her lover. Afterwards, Helene sends a message directed to Jean, not knowing if he will ever receive it, informing him that she has decided to break their relationship.

One evening, a British soldier survives a crash landing near Saint-Clar and, speaking French, passes himself off as a French villager when he is discovered by Jacques, a resident of Saint-Clar. Jacques brings the British soldier to dine with a German officer, claiming that the soldier was his friend from the army. The next day, Jacques reveals to the soldier that he was aware he was the soldier who had crashed that evening. The soldier then leaves for England.

Gerard and Francis both find Helene changed, and feel somewhat disgusted by her presence even though she has not told them she has taken Philip as a lover. Philip becomes involved with a gang who supports the German occupation and rats on Francis, who is later captured in Bordeaux and subsequently tortured then killed while trying to escape with Philip. Helene learns that her brother Francis was murdered and that her ex-fiancee, Jean, committed suicide by driving his plane downwards to a crash after receiving her letter informing him of their breakup. She feels alienated from her former virtuous self and has difficulty reconciling what she has caused with her ethics. Feeling distanced from most people, she becomes the lover of Jacques, who attempts to profit from the war.

The Americans and Russians eventually advance into France, liberating Paris, during which crowds of people join in to help fight the retreating German occupants. The Comte de Balansun, while initially holding out hope that his son Francis might still be alive, comes to believe that his son did indeed die. The novel also describes that during the occupation there were those who profited from the war, those who collaborated, those who switched sides depending on who was winning, and the different shades of morality that were created by the imposition of the darkness of the "night" during the German occupation.

== See also ==
- Boule de Suif, another critical look at French society set in the Franco-Prussian War
