= Robert Abirached =

French writer (1930–2021)

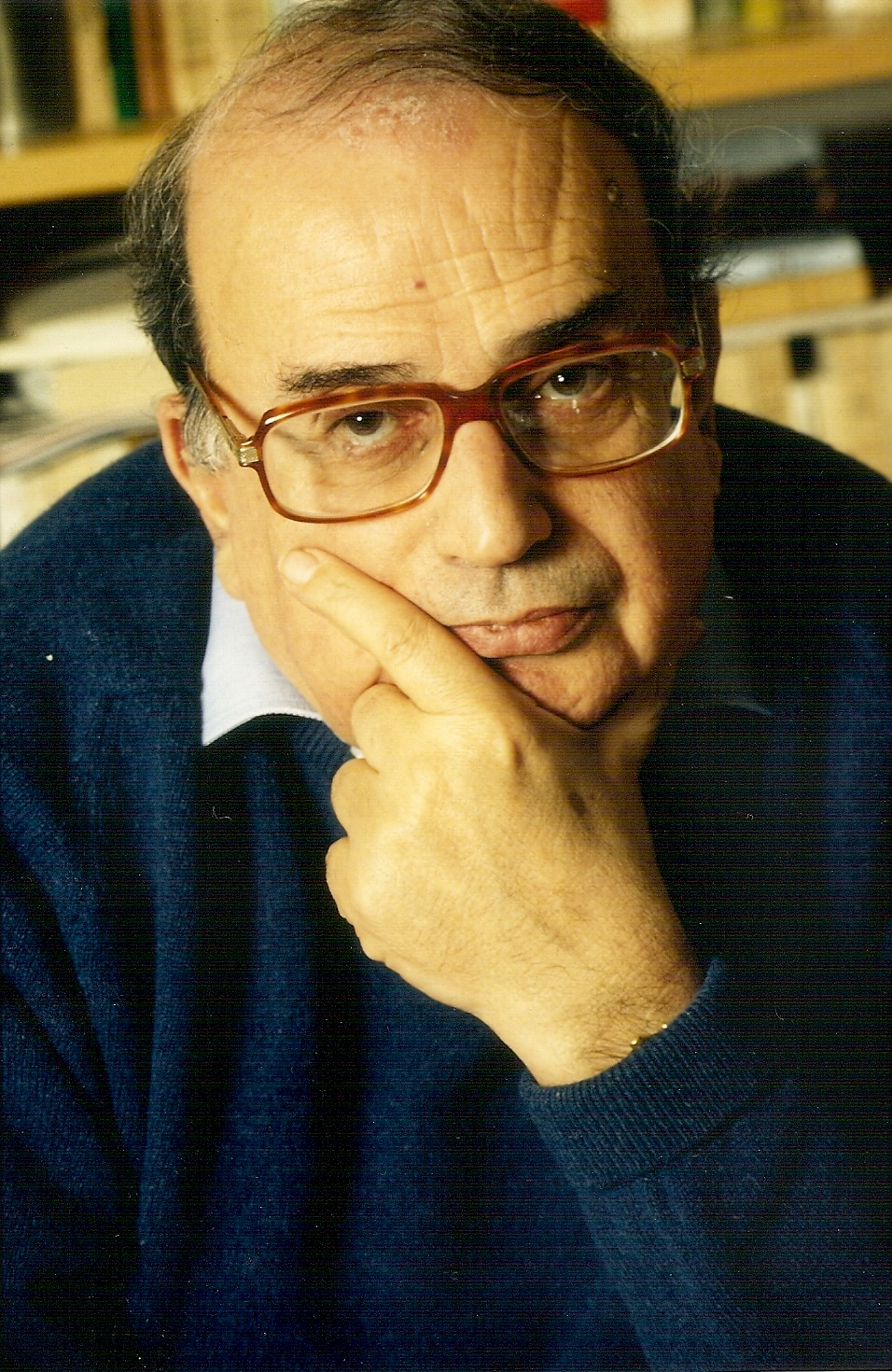
- Abirached in 1990
- Born: 25 August 1930; Beirut, Lebanon, France
- Died: 15 July 2021 (aged 90); Paris, France
- Occupations: Writer; Theatrologist

Robert Abirached (25 August 1930 – 15 July 2021) was a French writer and theatrologist. He moved to Paris in 1948 and was admitted to the École normale supérieure in 1952. He earned a doctoral degree from the Sorbonne in 1974.

== Principal works ==
- Écrivains d’aujourd’hui (1940-1960) (1960)
- Casanova ou la dissipation (1961)
- L’Emerveillée (1963)
- Tu connais la musique? (1971)
- Jean Vauthier (1973)
- La Crise du personnage dans le théâtre moderne (1978)
- La Décentralisation théâtrale
  - Le Premier Âge, 1945-1958 (1992)
  - Les Années Malraux, 1959-1968 (1993)
  - 1968, le tournant (1994)
  - Le Temps des incertitudes, 1969-1981 (1995)
- Le Théâtre et le Prince (2005)
- Le Théâtre en France au xxe siècle (2011)

== Distinctions ==
- Prix Sainte-Beuve (1961)
- Commander of the Ordre des Arts et des Lettres (1981)
- Prix SACD (1984)
- Officer of the Legion of Honour (1992)
- Commander of the Ordre national du Mérite (1998)
- Commander of the Ordre des Palmes académiques (2001)
