= Claude Demassieux =

French politician

Member of the National Assembly for Pas-de-Calais's 7th constituency
- In office 28 March 1993 – 21 April 1997
- Preceded by: André Capet
- Succeeded by: André Capet

Personal details
- Born: 4 July 1946 (age 79) Calais, France
- Party: Rally for the Republic

Claude Demassieux (born 4 July 1946) is a French politician from Rally for the Republic, who served as a member of the National Assembly between 1993 and 1997, representing the Pas-de-Calais's 7th constituency.
