= Henri Thomas =

French writer and poet

Henri Thomas (7 December 1912 – 3 November 1993) was a French writer and poet.

== Life ==
Henri Thomas was born in Anglemont, Vosges, and grew up in the Alsace/Lorraine region of France. He moved to Paris to attend the prestigious Henri IV high school, working with the noted essayist Alain. However, his teaching and academic career faltered and he dedicated himself to writing full-time from 1935. He mixed with many influential intellectuals and writers in Paris in the 1930s and 1940s, most notably Gide and Paulhan. His first novel, The Coal Bucket, was published by Gallimard in 1940. The majority of his literary output of the next forty-odd years (novels, short stories, journals, poems, essays, etc.) would be put out by the same publisher. In the 1940s, he did his military service, got married, worked on a number of literary reviews, and later separated from his wife.

In 1945, Thomas took a job with the BBC in London and lived and worked there for about ten years. Also during this period, he met the woman who would later become his second wife and their daughter was born while the couple were in London.

In 1958, he was hired as a professor at Brandeis University in the United States, where he lived and worked for two years.

After his return to France in 1960, he worked as a literary editor and translator at Gallimard and spent his time primarily in Paris and in Brittany, although after his second wife died in 1965, Thomas began to live mostly in Brittany. He moved to a rest home in Paris in 1991 after his health failed and died there in 1993.

== Works ==
=== Novels (partial list) ===
- The Coal Bucket (1940)
- The Tutor (1942)
- Living Together (1945)
- The Deserters (1951)
- London Night (1956)
- John Perkins (1960)
- The Last Year (1960)
- The Promontory (1961)
- Perjury (1964)
- The Relic (1969)

=== Short story collections (partial list) ===
- The Target (1955)
- The Story of Pierrot and Several Others (1960)

=== Poetry ===
- Poetry (1970)

=== Translations ===
- He translated Ernst Jünger's On the Marble Cliffs (1939) to French
