= Gilles Cocquempot =

French politician

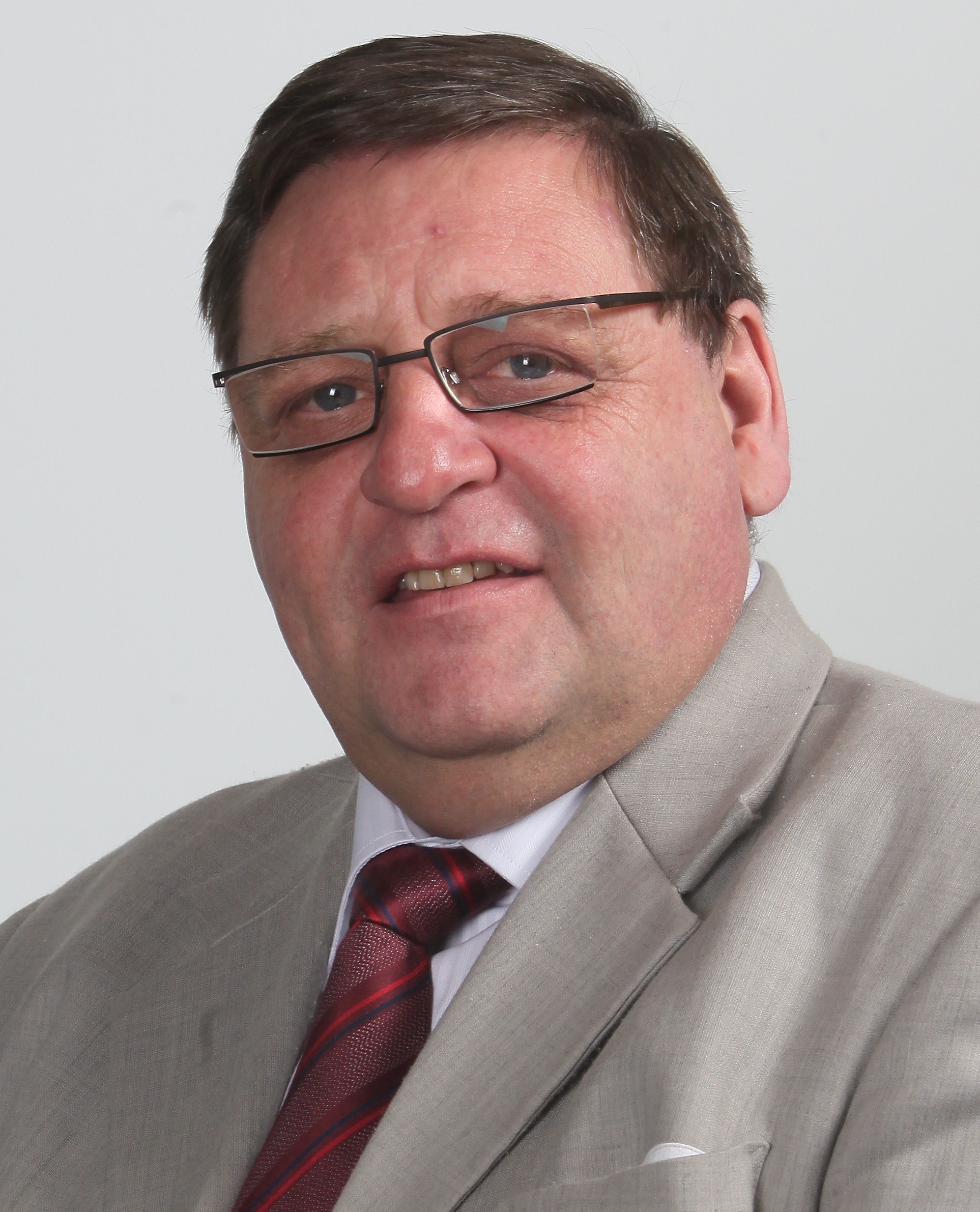
A picture of Gilles Cocquempot

Gilles Cocquempot (born 22 October 1952 in Éperlecques) is a member of the National Assembly of France. He represented the Pas-de-Calais department, as a member of the Socialiste, radical, citoyen et divers gauche.
