= Granvelle Palace, Brussels =

Demolished palace in Brussels, Belgium

Granvelle Palace
- Palais Granvelle (French); Granvellepaleis (Dutch)
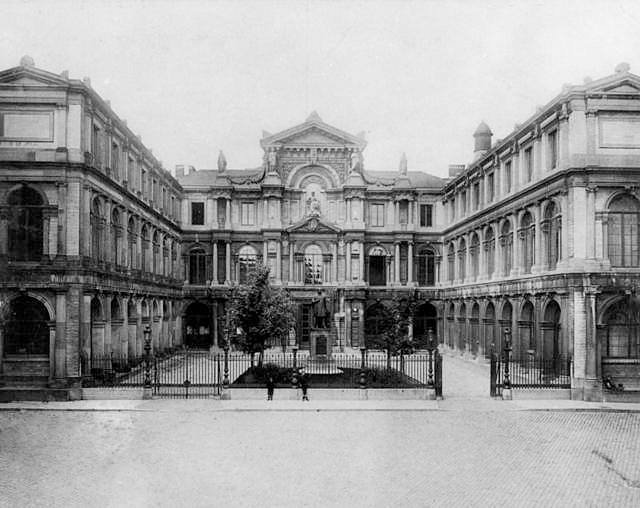
- The Granvelle Palace's main entrance on the Rue des Sols/Stuiversstraat, c. 1900

General information
- Type: Palace
- Architectural style: Renaissance
- Location: Brussels, Belgium
- Coordinates: 50°50′41″N 4°21′30″E
- Construction started: c. 1550
- Demolished: 1931
- Client: Antoine Perrenot de Granvelle

Design and construction
- Architect: Sébastien van Noyen

The Granvelle Palace (French: Palais Granvelle; Dutch: Granvellepaleis) was a 16th-century Renaissance palace in Brussels, Belgium. It was originally built for Cardinal Archbishop Antoine Perrenot de Granvelle and was located in the former Putterie/Putterij district, between the Rue des Sols/Stuiversstraat and the Rue de l'Impératrice/Keizerinstraat, near today's Brussels-Central railway station.

The deeply redesigned Granvelle Palace served as the main seat of the Free University of Brussels between 1842 and 1928. It was demolished in 1931 to make way for the North–South connection, a major railway link through central Brussels. The Ravenstein Gallery was built on its site.

== History ==
=== The Palace of Granvelle ===
The Granvelle Palace was built around 1550 as the sumptuous residence of Cardinal Archbishop Antoine Perrenot de Granvelle. Granvelle acquired two existing hôtels particuliers there in 1549–50 and had them merged into one of the earliest and most accomplished manifestations of High Renaissance in the Southern Netherlands. The architect's name is not documented, but it is usually assumed that it was Sébastien van Noyen. Other candidates are Francesco Paciotti and Francesco de' Marchi, military engineers employed by Pope Paul III, with whom Granvelle maintained close contacts.

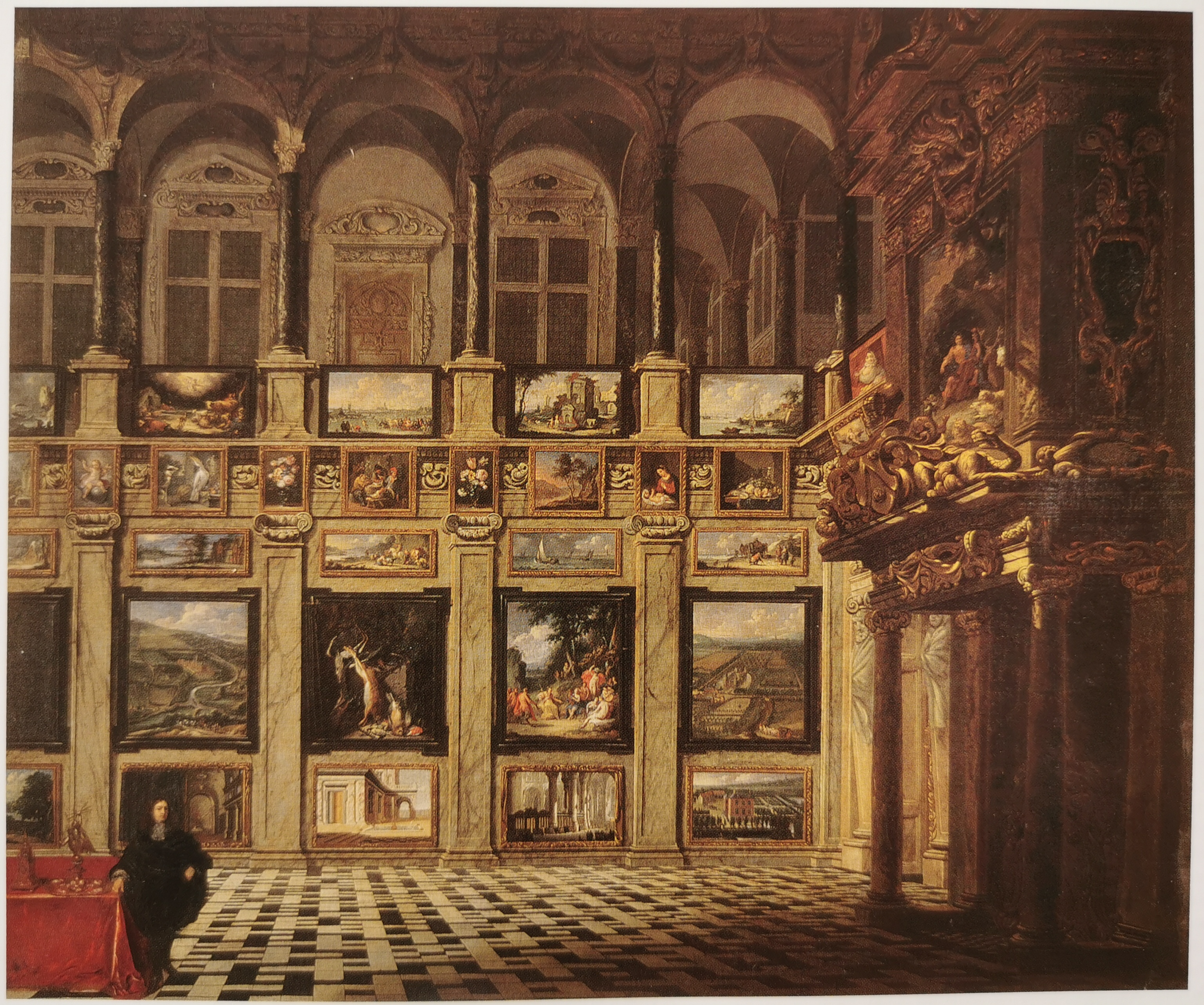
The Granvelle Palace's interior on a 17th-century painting, depicting then-owner Pieter Ferdinand Roose

The Granvelle Palace was directly inspired by the courtyard façades of the Palazzo Farnese, designed by Michelangelo and Vignola. During the trip to Rome that Van Noyen undertook around 1550, upon Granvelle's instigation, those façades were under construction, so he may have visited the building site. It is also possible that several architects were involved in the Granvelle Palace with its different wings.

The main entrance was located on the Rue des Sols/Stuiversstraat. Four wings were arranged around a square courtyard and a staircase tower topped with a cupola. A large gallery with open arcades departed from it, parallel to the curve of the Cantersteen/Kantersteen. Between the street and gallery was a steeply sloping garden, with citrus and fig trees, aromatic herbs and four large fountains. On the side of the Cantersteen, there was a second courtyard with further buildings and a showpiece façade. In his palace, Granvelle amassed an impressive collection of sculptures, including an antique Venus and Cupid or Apollo.

In 1564, the unpopular Granvelle was forced to leave the Netherlands. As the right-hand man of King Philip II of Spain, he had earned his way with the high nobility, and also with the regent Margaret of Parma. On 13 March, his brother Thomas picked him up at his palace, whereupon unknown pranksters then nailed a "rush sale" sign. He would never see his Brussels residence again. His provost kept him regularly informed of the situation and was able to report, among other things, that the Duke of Alba, out of discretion, had refrained from taking up residence in the palace (the duke stayed in the no less luxurious Palace of William of Orange, his arch enemy).

Pierre-Jacques Goetghebuer's Choix des monuments (1827)

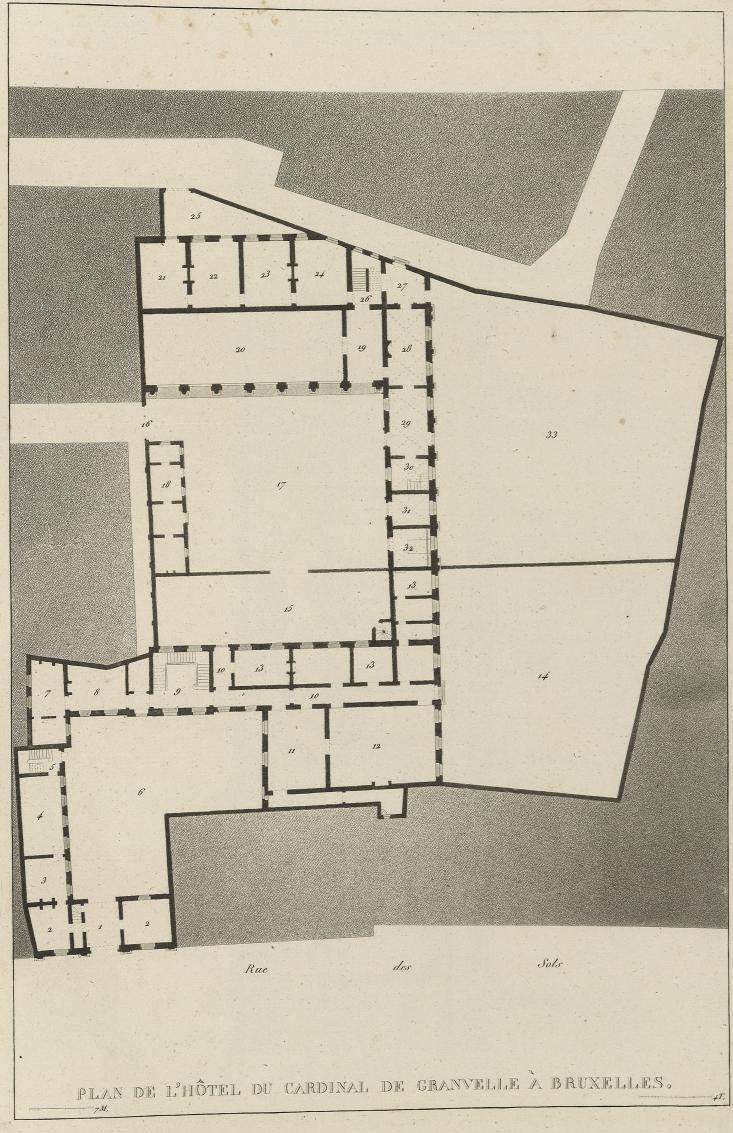
Floor plan of the Granvelle Palace

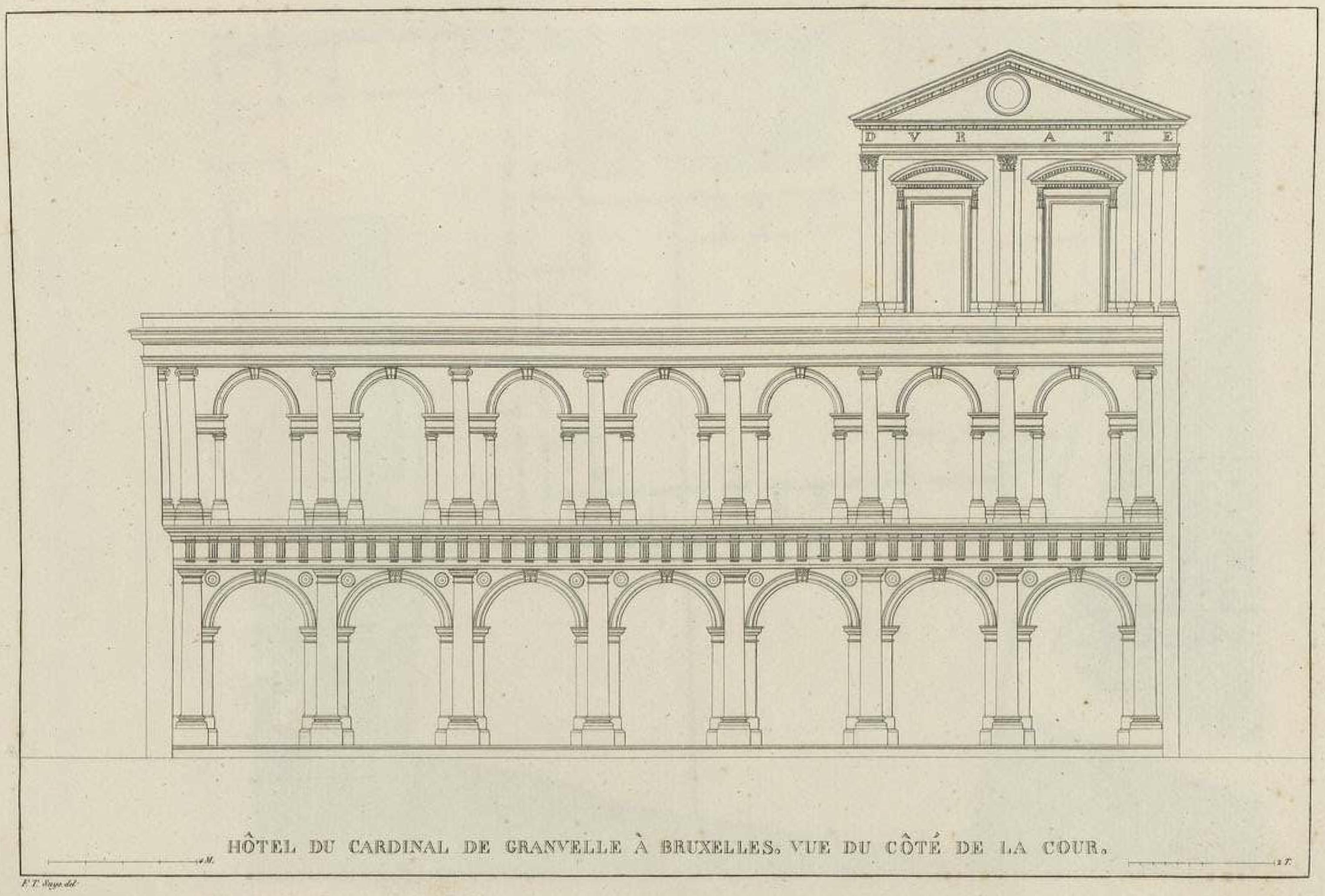
Courtyard façade

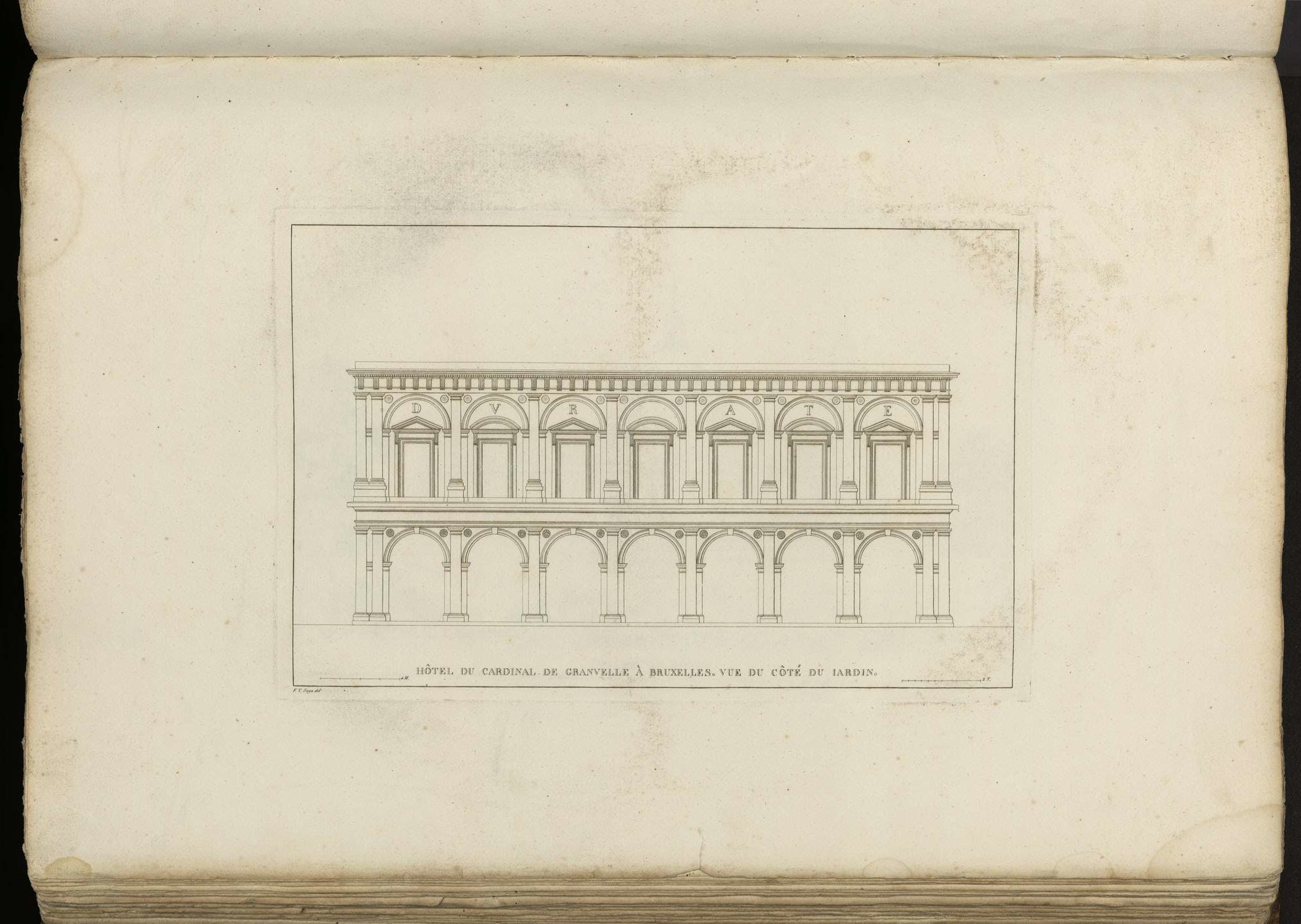
Garden façade

=== Later history ===
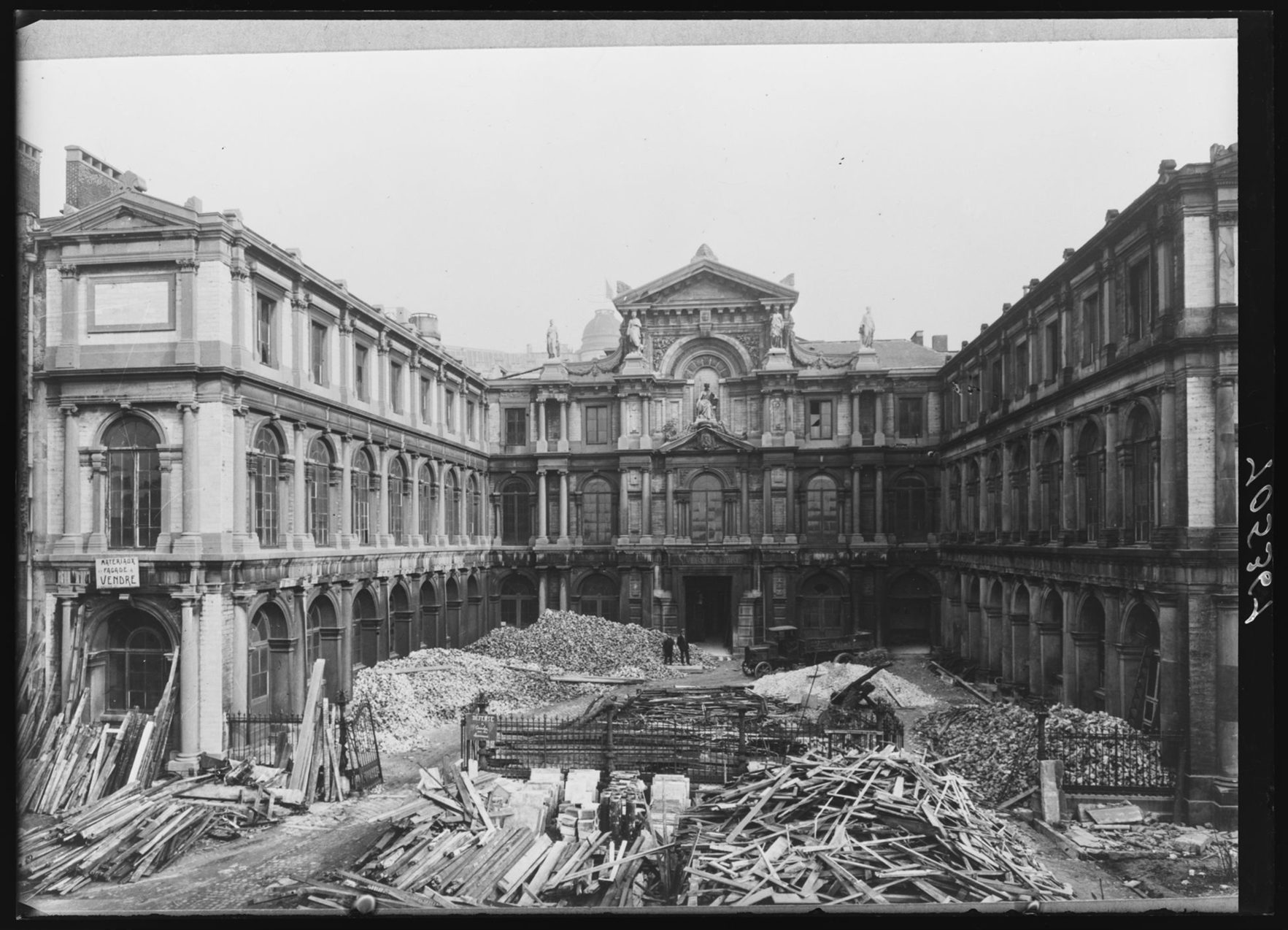
The palace shortly before demolition

Over two centuries, various owners succeeded one another, including Prince Charles Alexander of Lorraine, Governor-General of the Austrian Netherlands, and the Prince of Chimay. After the fire in the Coudenberg Palace (1731) and the move of the court to the Palace of Orange-Nassau, the building served as accommodation for the Secret Council and subsequently for the Council of Finance. This entailed some transformations. During this period, it became popularly known as the Hôtel des sous ("Pennies House").

In 1842, the Free University of Brussels moved into the palace (first in part of it and from 1850 in its entirety), which it occupied until 1928. The Free University had the façade renovated by the architects Henri Beyaert and Antoine Trappeniers (1863) and had new sculptures installed. It also housed the premises of the Middle School A, today's Athénée Robert Catteau, until 1893.

In 1928, the Free University had to make way for the North–South connection after 75 years. Although located some distance from the actual railway tunnel, the Granvelle Palace was demolished in 1931. The municipality of Woluwe-Saint-Pierre acquired its façades with the aim of reusing them in the construction of its new Municipal Hall, which ultimately did not happen. Unsculpted blue stones were used as sidewalk curbs in 1944, part of the white stones was used for the construction of a colonnade in Woluwe-Saint-Pierre Cemetery, and the rest was gradually sold to various private individuals. In 1956, the Ravenstein Gallery was built on the site.

== See also ==
- History of Brussels
- Culture of Belgium
- Belgium in the long nineteenth century
