= Bortier Gallery =

Covered passageway in Brussels, Belgium

- Galerie Bortier (French); Bortiergalerij (Dutch)
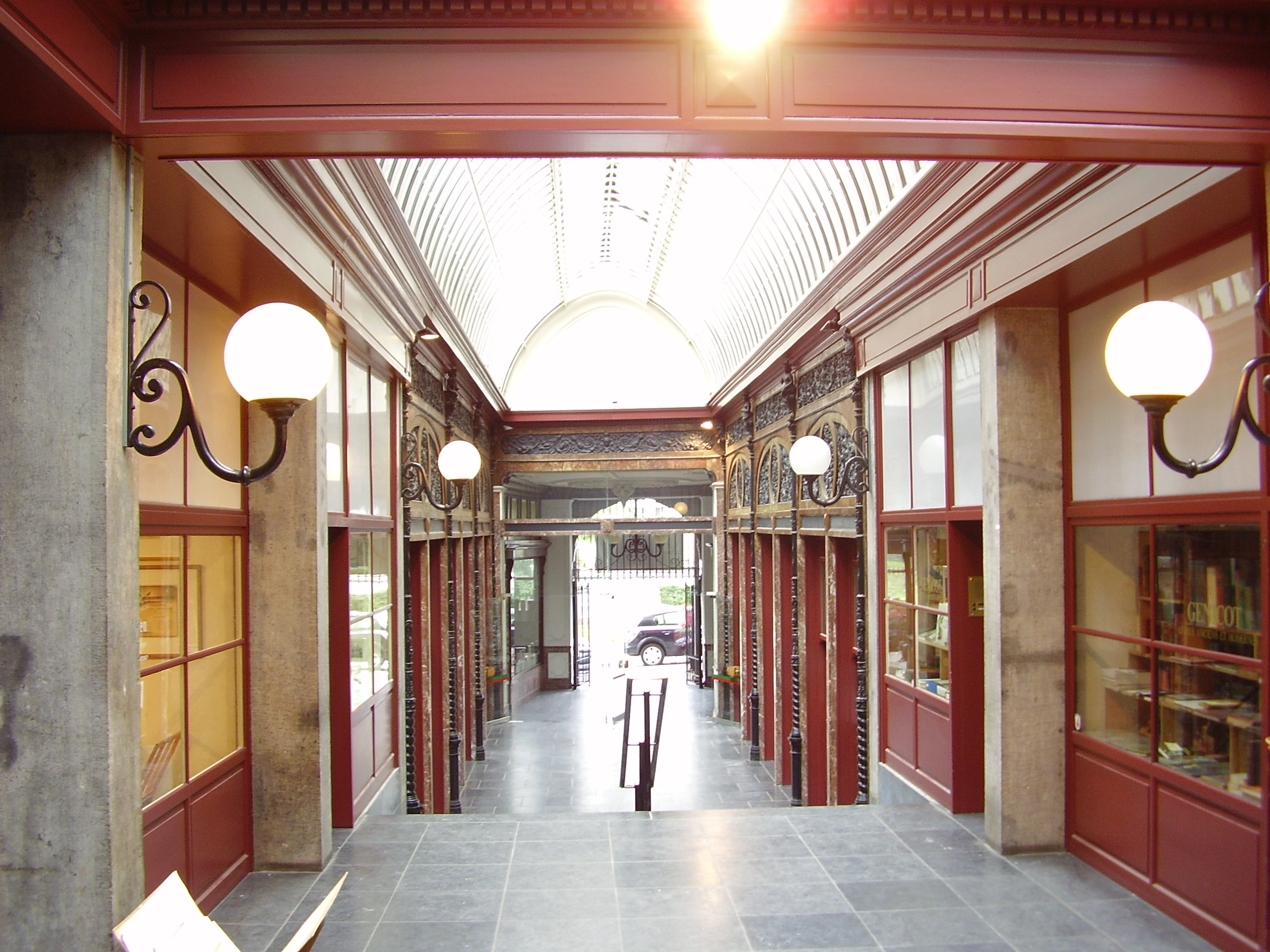
- Location: City of Brussels, Brussels-Capital Region, Belgium
- Coordinates: 50°50′40″N 4°21′18″E
- Address: Rue de la Madeleine / Magdalenastraat 55
- Opened: 1848
- Developer: Pierre Bortier, City of Brussels
- Owner: City of Brussels
- Architect: Jean-Pierre Cluysenaer
- Public transit: Brussels-Central; 1 5 Gare Centrale/Centraal Station
- Website: bortier.be/en

The Bortier Gallery (French: Galerie Bortier; Dutch: Bortiergalerij) is a glazed shopping arcade in central Brussels, Belgium. It was designed and built in 1847 by the architect Jean-Pierre Cluysenaer in a neo-Renaissance style, and opened in the following year. As well as being one of the first European shopping arcades, it is a fine example of the joint use of cast iron and glass.

The gallery is situated between the Mont des Arts/Kunstberg and the Grand-Place/Grote Markt (Brussels' main square), not far from the more monumental Royal Saint-Hubert Galleries. It is owned by the City of Brussels and is managed by its Land Administration services.

== History ==
=== Early history ===
Originally, the gallery was part of the Marché de la Madeleine/Magdalenamarkt complex, a covered market also designed by the Dutch architect Jean-Pierre Cluysenaer. The façade on the Rue de la Madeleine/Magdalenastraat, in a Flemish Baroque style, antedates the construction of the gallery behind it. This front dates from 1763 and was recovered from the Hôtel des Grandes Messageries, a town house situated on that site.

The gallery owes its name to an investor named Pierre Bortier, who had acquired land between the Rue Duquesnoy/Duquesnoystraat and the Rue Saint-Jean/Sint-Jansstraat, made available by the demolition of the former Hôpital Saint-Jean/Sint-Janshospitaal. He proposed to the Brussels' authorities to build the Marché de la Madeleine/Magdalenamarkt. This covered market had its main entrance on the Rue Duquesnoy. Starting from the Hôtel des Grandes Messageries, located on the Rue de la Madeleine, the gallery passed along the rounded southern end of the market hall on the level of its first floor, and ended on the Rue Saint-Jean.

Jean-Baptiste Moens, known as the father of philately, ran a shop in the Bortier Gallery from 1853 onwards.

=== 20th and 21st centuries ===
The Madeleine market was demolished in 1957 and replaced by a modern event hall, leaving only the original façade in place. The Bortier Gallery was thus detached from the market building. Very degraded, it was closed until 1974–1977, when it was renovated by the architects Paul and Marcel Mignot.

By the late 20th century, the gallery had become well known to lovers of literature and old books, being almost entirely occupied with stalls and shops selling second-hand books, prints, postcards and magazines.

In 2024, all but three of the bookshops closed, as the gallery was controversially renovated as a "gastronomic gallery", primarily housing cafés and eateries.

== Gallery ==
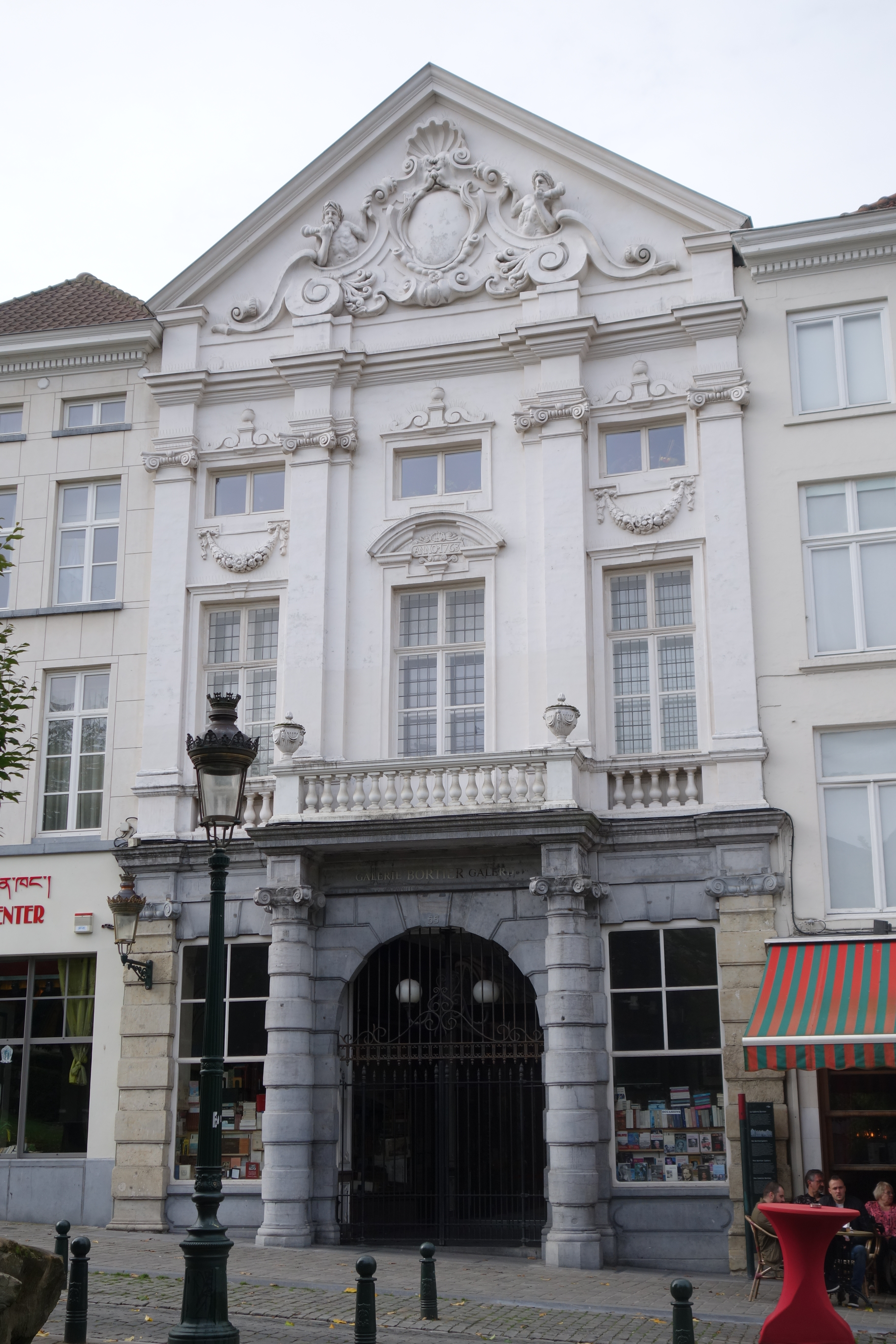
Façade on the Rue de la Madeleine/Magdalenastraat

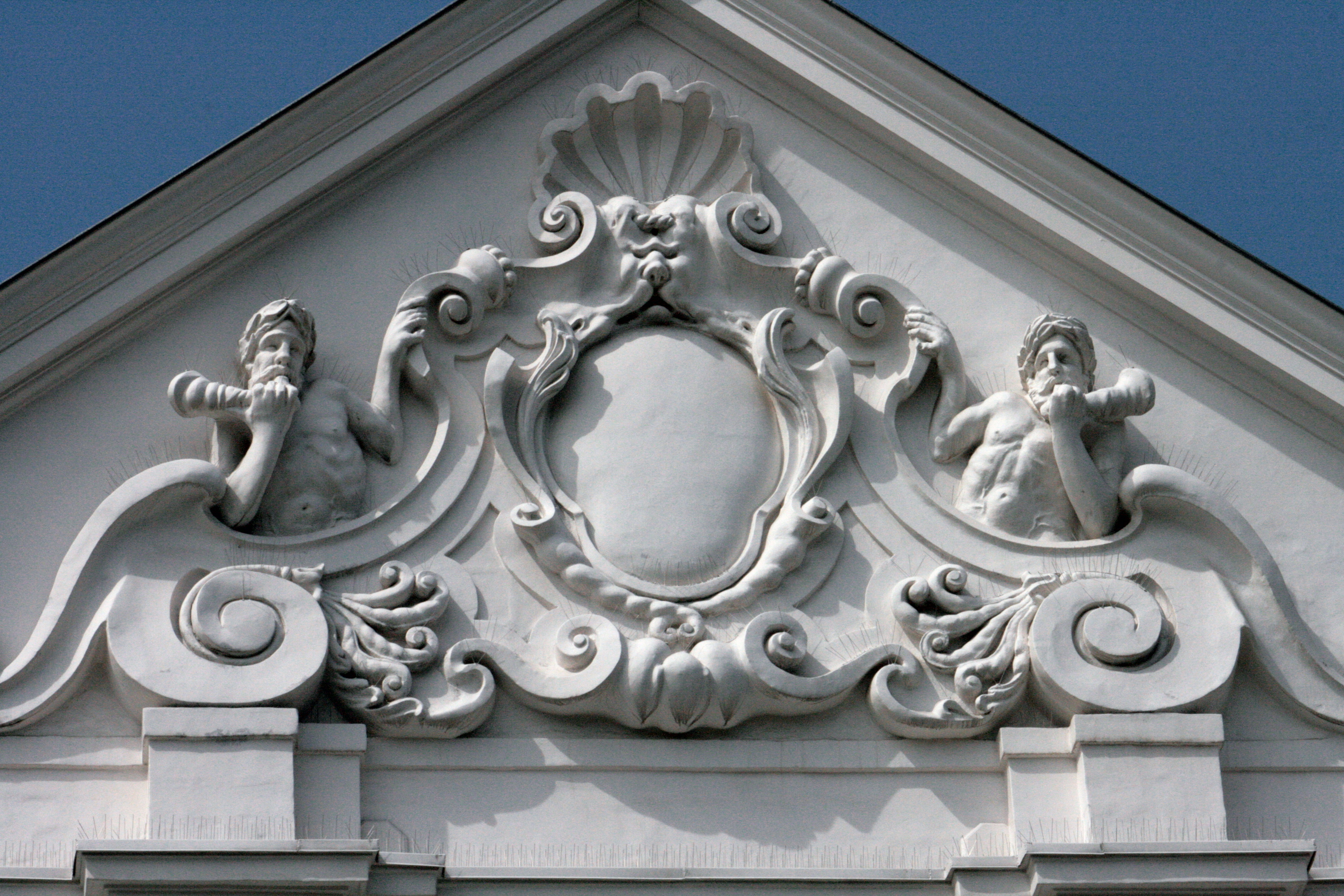
Detail of the façade

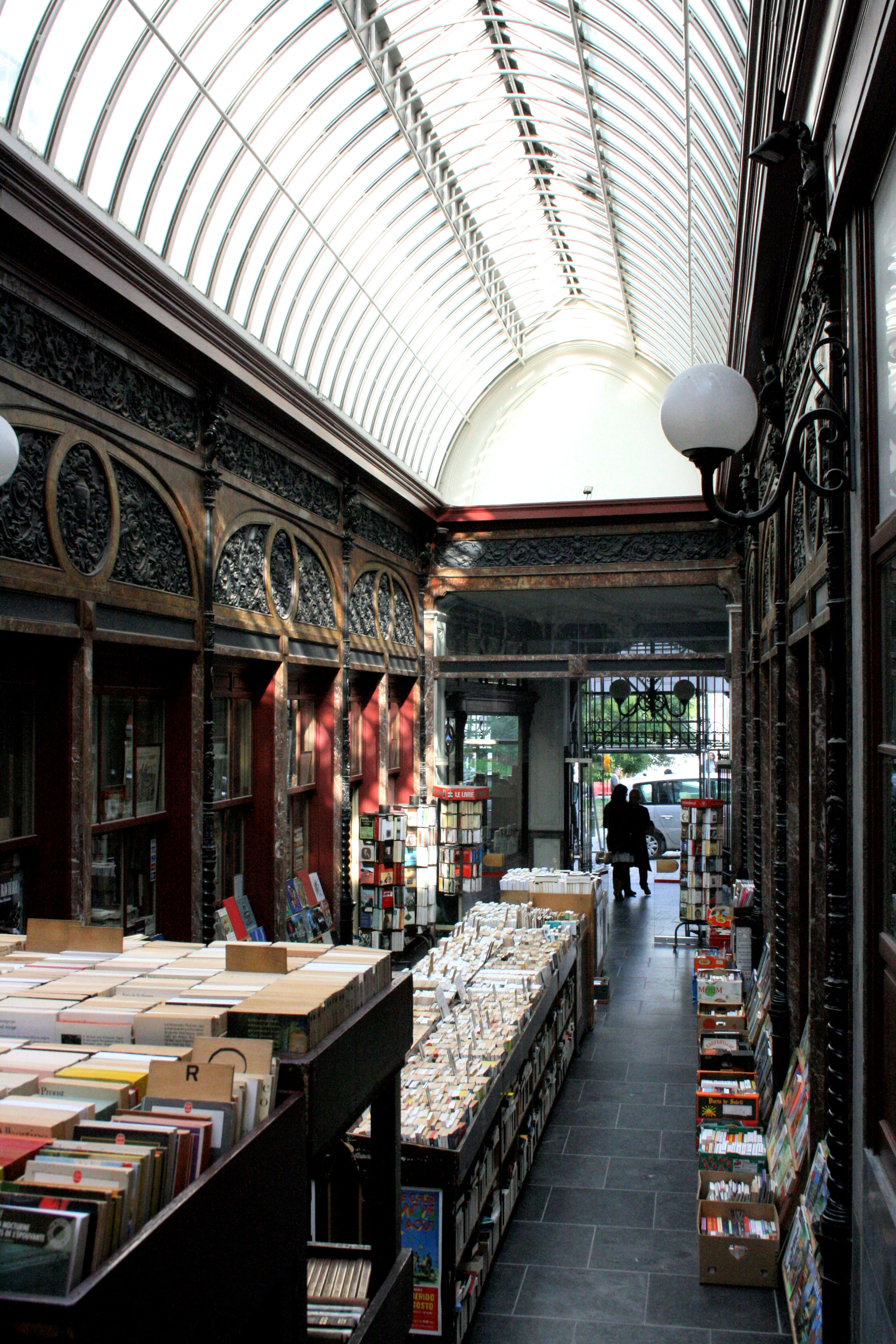
Interior

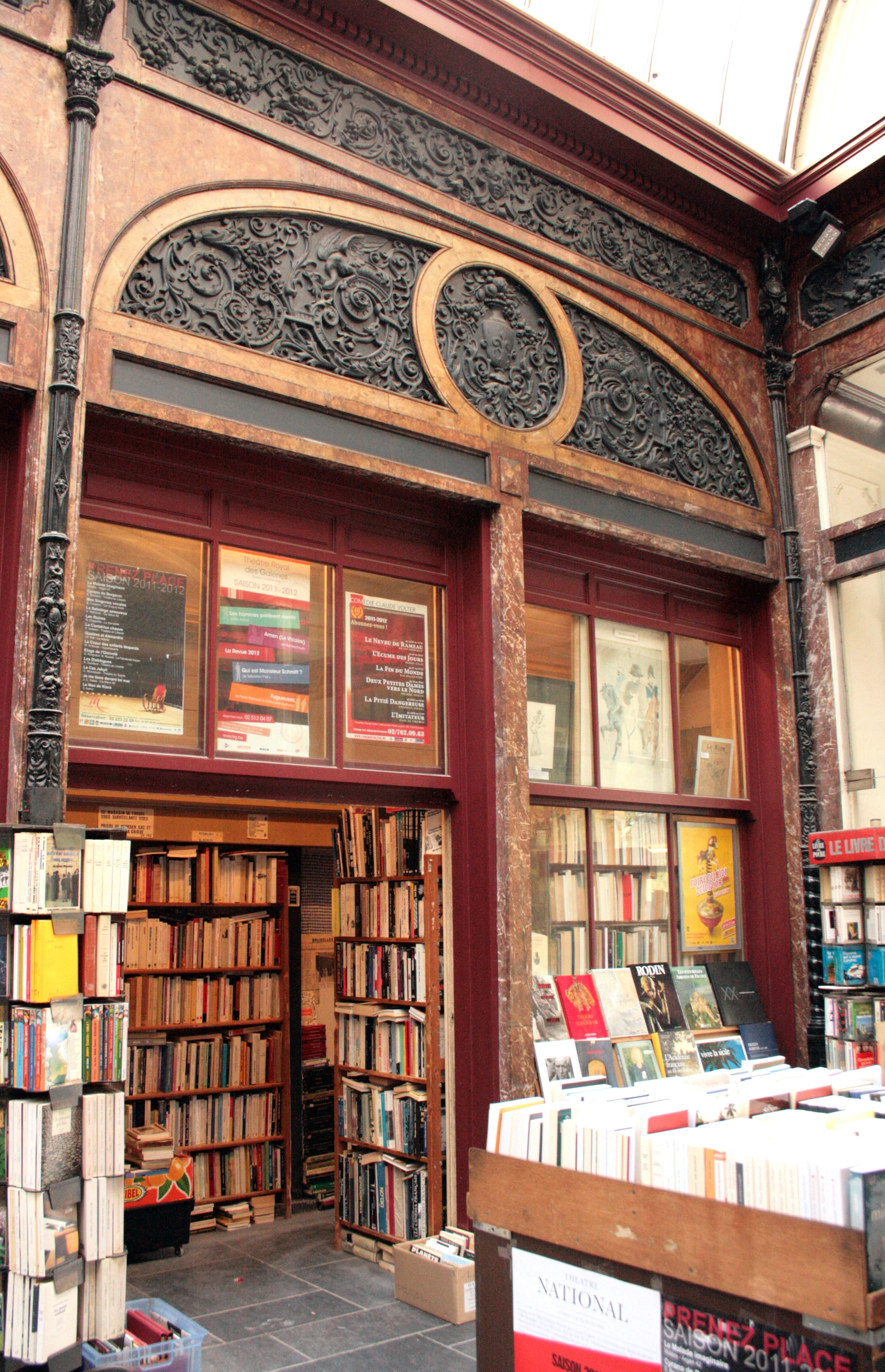
Bookshop

== See also ==
- Arcade galleries in Brussels
- History of Brussels
- Culture of Belgium
- Belgium in the long nineteenth century
