= Arcade galleries in Brussels =

Covered passageways in Brussels, Belgium

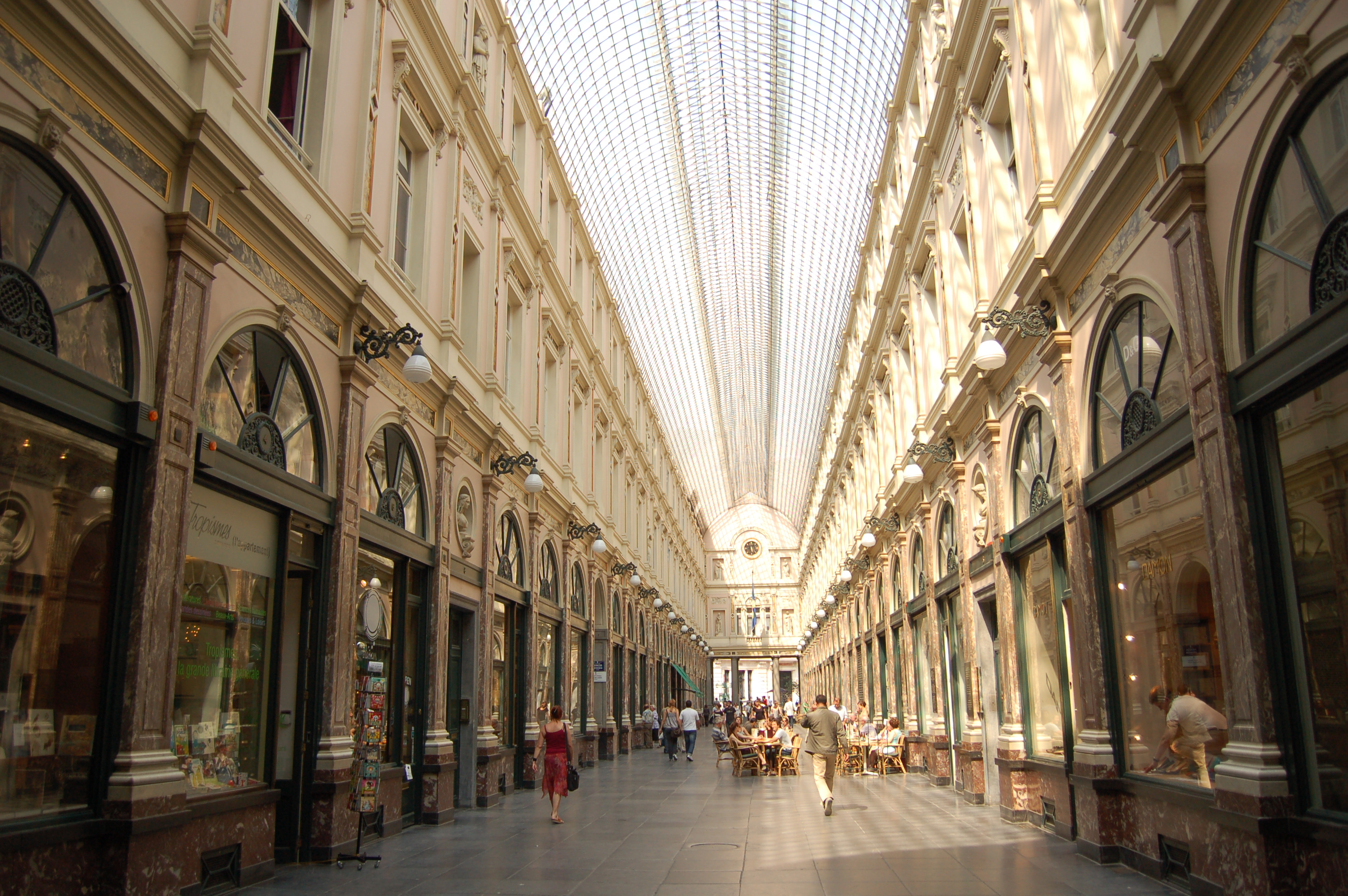
Royal Saint-Hubert Galleries

The shopping galleries in Brussels are multiple covered walkways in the centre of the capital city of Belgium. These glazed pedestrian arcades are lined with shops, cafés and other commercial or cultural establishments. Characterised by their glass roofs and monumental structures, they form an important part of the city's architectural and commercial heritage. They also foreshadow contemporary department stores and shopping centres.

== History ==
The development of covered galleries in Brussels began in the first half of the 19th century, following a wider European trend particularly associated with Paris and London. Between 1820 and 1880, several arcades were constructed in the city centre, combining commercial, social and urban functions. They provided sheltered pedestrian routes through densely built-up city blocks while accommodating shops, cafés and other commercial or cultural establishments. Brussels had about 50 such galleries around 1850, of which a few still exist. Among the best-known examples are the Royal Saint-Hubert Galleries, one of the oldest covered shopping arcades in Europe, the Bortier Gallery and the Northern Gallery.

A second phase of gallery construction took place in the 20th century, particularly during the post-war period, with examples such as the Centre Gallery and the Ravenstein Gallery. These later galleries reflected the influence of modernist architecture and a shift towards more functional approaches to commercial development and urban planning. In contrast to the 19th-century arcades, which were characterised by elaborate ornamentation, cast-iron structures and extensive glazed roofs, the post-war galleries made use of reinforced concrete, glass blocks and geometric architectural forms. They were also increasingly integrated into larger mixed-use developments, incorporating offices, housing, underground parking and commercial facilities.

== List of arcade galleries ==
Name	Construction finished	Architect	Image
Bortier Gallery (Galerie Bortier / Bortiergalerij)	1847	Jean-Pierre Cluysenaar	
Centre Gallery (Galerie du centre / Centrumgalerij)	1952	Jean-Florian Collin	
Horta Gallery (Galerie Horta / Hortagalerij)	1950s, re-opened in 2009	Victor Horta (official)	
Royal Saint-Hubert Galleries (Galeries Royales Saint-Hubert / Koninklijke Sint-Hubertusgalerijen)	1846	Jean-Pierre Cluysenaar	
Northern Gallery (Passage du Nord / Noorddoorgang)	1882	Henri Rieck	
Ravenstein Gallery (Galerie Ravenstein / Ravensteingalerij)	1958	Alexis and Philippe Dumont	

== See also ==
- History of Brussels
- Culture of Belgium
- Belgium in the long nineteenth century
