= Théâtre royal des Galeries =

Theatre in Brussels, Belgium

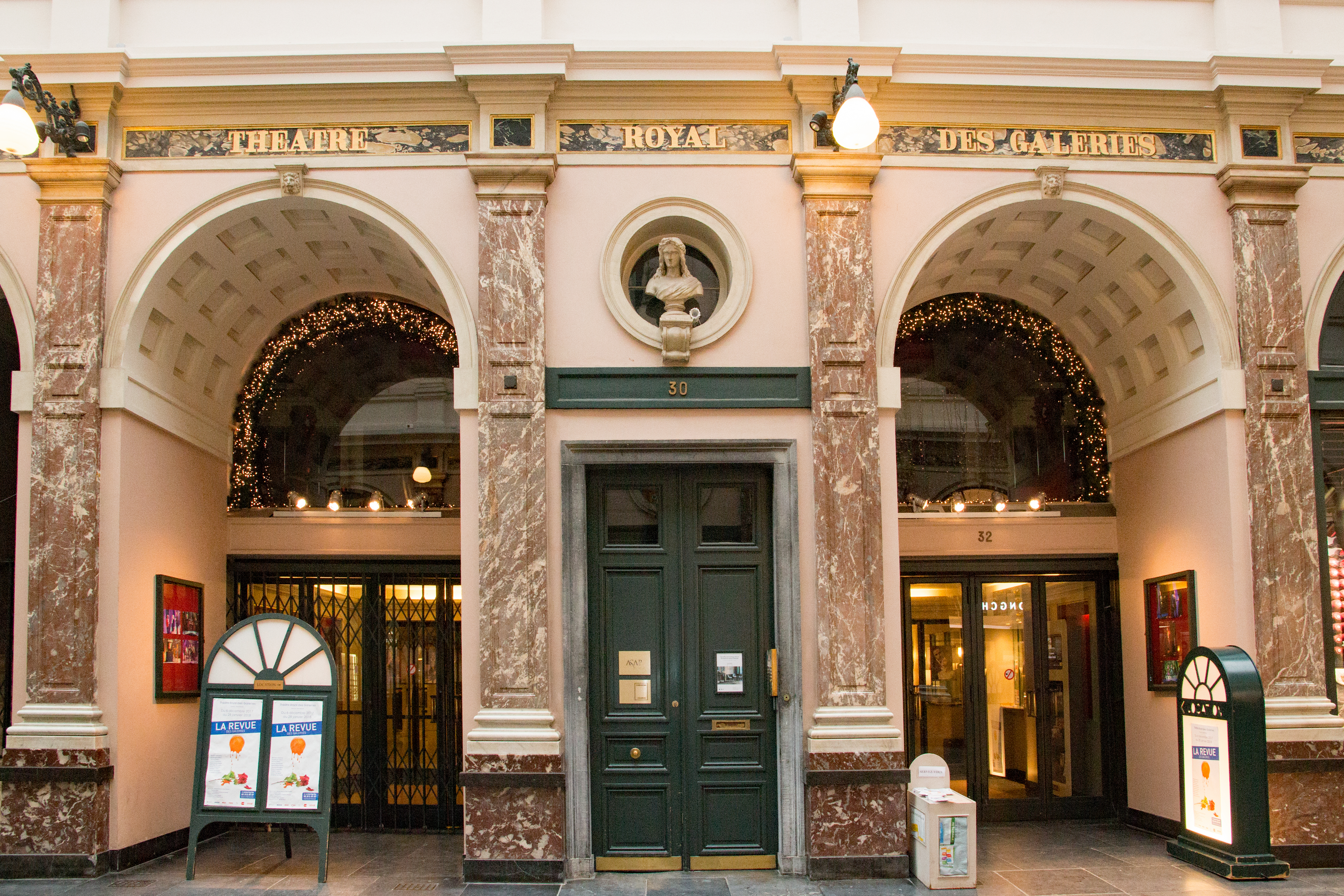
- Current façade of the Théâtre des Galeries
- Interactive map of Théâtre royal des Galeries
- Address: Galerie du Roi / Koningsgalerij 32; 1000 City of Brussels, Brussels-Capital Region; Belgium
- Coordinates: 50°50′54″N 4°21′19″E
- Operator: Compagnie des Galeries
- Capacity: 850
- Type: Theatre
- Public transit: Brussels-Central; 1 5 Gare Centrale/Centraal Station

Construction
- Opened: 1847
- Architects: Jean-Pierre Cluysenaar, Paul Bonduelle

Website
- www.trg.be

The Théâtre royal des Galeries (French pronunciation: [teɑtʁ ʁwajal de ɡalʁi]; "Royal Theatre of the Galleries"; abbreviated TRG) is a theatre in central Brussels, Belgium, subsidised by the French Community of Belgium. It opened in 1847 and has continuously hosted theatrical activities ever since. It is located in the Royal Saint-Hubert Galleries.

== History ==
=== Early history ===
The Théâtre royal des Galeries was originally designed by Jean-Pierre Cluysenaar, the young architect of the Royal Saint-Hubert Galleries. Construction started in 1846 and the passage (including the theatre) was inaugurated on 20 June 1847 by King Leopold I.

Originally, the theatre programmed romantic drama, melodrama and operetta. The theatre was the first theatre to host the play adaptation of Victor Hugo's novel Les Misérables in 1863, which at the time was banned in France. In the first half of the 20th century, the programme became avant-garde and included Russian ballet.

=== Contemporary ===
In 1951, the theatre was demolished and the reconstruction was entrusted to the architect Paul Bonduelle and the decorator Stéphane Jasinski. If the theatre hall kept its Italianate-style appearance with its red and gold velvet, the restoration was carried out so that the 850 seats would be front-facing for the spectator's comfort. The surrealist painter René Magritte designed the "cloudy" fresco on the hall's ceiling.

Since 1953, it has been possible to attend performances there of the Compagnie des Galeries, which was founded by Jean-Pierre Rey and is subsidised by the French Community of Belgium. The repertoire includes boulevard theatre and plays by Belgian dramatists, ranging from drama to comedy. Furthermore, the company performs an end-of-year satirical revue.

Thanks to its rich repertoire, the theatre's actors have become known beyond Brussels, especially with the play Le Mariage de mademoiselle Beulemans, which was recorded and broadcast in 1978 by the French-language public broadcaster RTBF. Iconic actors such as Christiane Lenain, Jacques Lippe and Ania Guédroïtz took part in that performance, which was broadcast in Belgium and abroad.

The Théâtre des Galeries retains its image as an entertainment theatre, with many contemporary authors included in its programming. The company is currently directed by David Michels, who also stages the revue during the holiday season. An average of 30,000 spectators attend this satirical show, which revisits the year's news through humour.

In 2016, the company's operating grant amounted to €876,273. To achieve this, the theatre had to programme at least 25 different plays, including at least five by Belgian authors, and welcome a minimum of 120,000 paying visitors.

== See also ==
- History of Brussels
- Culture of Belgium
- Belgium in the long nineteenth century
