= Northern Gallery =

Covered passageway in Brussels, Belgium

- Passage du Nord (French); Noorddoorgang (Dutch)
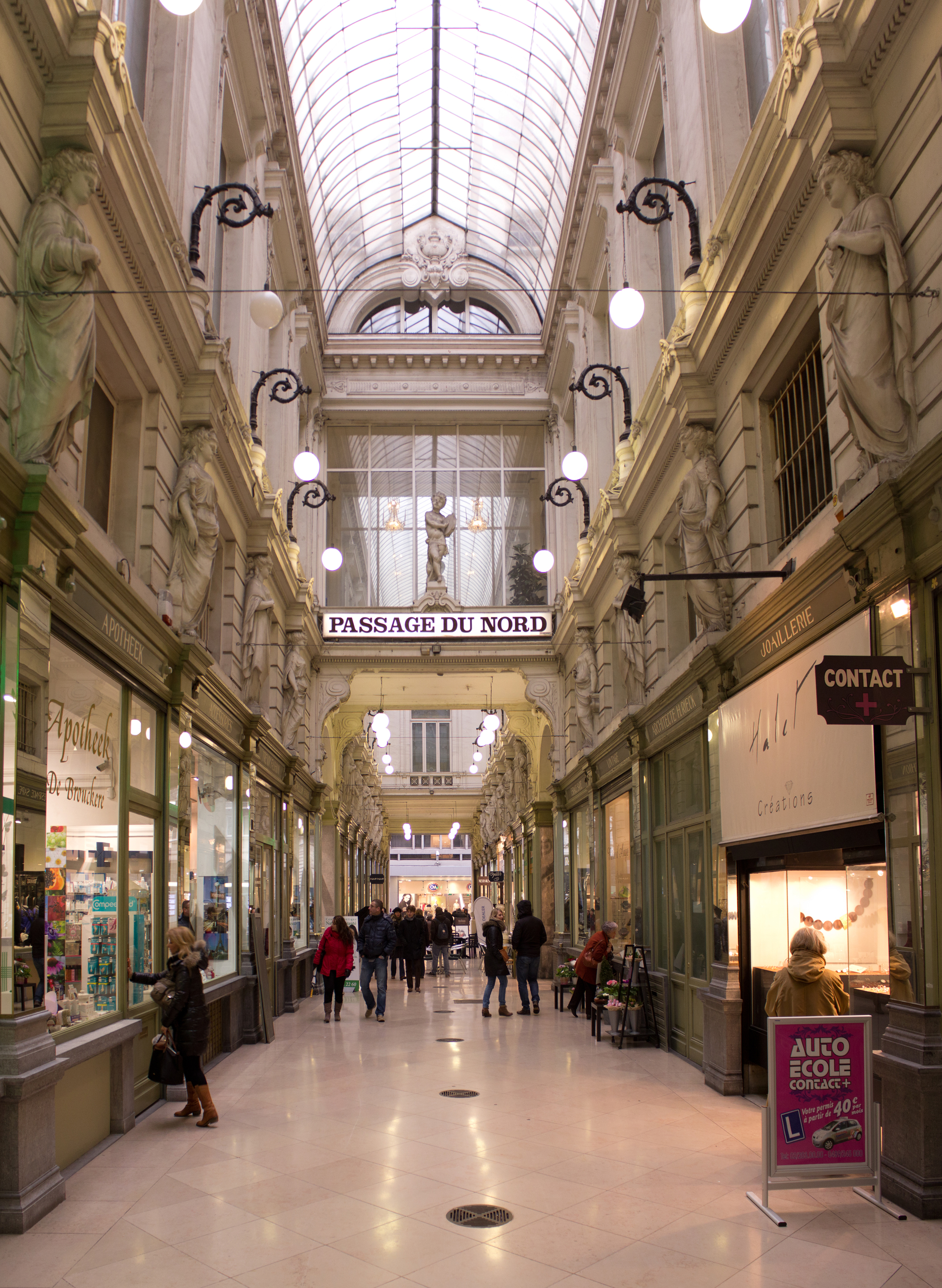
- Location: City of Brussels, Brussels-Capital Region, Belgium
- Coordinates: 50°51′07″N 4°21′15″E
- Address: Rue Neuve / Nieuwstraat 40
- Opened: 25 May 1882
- Architect: Henri Rieck
- Public transit: 1 4 5 10 De Brouckère
- Website: passagedunord.be/en

The Northern Gallery or Northern Passage (French: Passage du Nord; Dutch: Noorddoorgang) is a glazed shopping arcade in central Brussels, Belgium. It was designed and built in 1881–82 by the architect Henri Rieck in an eclectic style, following the covering of the Senne and the creation of the Central Boulevards. It is decorated with 32 caryatids in the neoclassical style by Joseph Bertheux and sculptures and putti by Albert Desenfans.

The gallery is located between the Rue Neuve/Nieuwstraat and the Boulevard Adolphe Max/Adolphe Maxlaan.

== History ==
The Northern Gallery was erected in 1881–82 according to the plans of the architect Henri Rieck at the request of the Société anonyme du Musée et Passage du Nord. The project focused on the development of the Central Boulevards and the new shopping gallery was to constitute a direct and covered link between the Place De Brouckère/De Brouckèreplein and the Boulevard du Nord/Noordlaan (today's Boulevard Adolphe Max/Adolphe Maxlaan) with the Rue Neuve/Nieuwstraat.

Executed in an eclectic style and inaugurated on 25 May 1882, the gallery was lined at that time with 34 shops and a museum on the ground floor, while the upper floors were reserved for all kinds of cultural activities. The monumental façades are richly decorated, notably with sculptures by Joseph Berteux and Albert Desenfans. At the beginning of the 21st century, there are only twenty stores left as a result of some amalgamations of stores. The halls of the museum are now used as seminar rooms, a fitness room and rooms of the Hotel Métropole.

Certain parts of the Northern Gallery, namely the façades on the street side, the interior façades, the domed glass roof and the floors, received protected status on 13 April 1995.

== Gallery ==
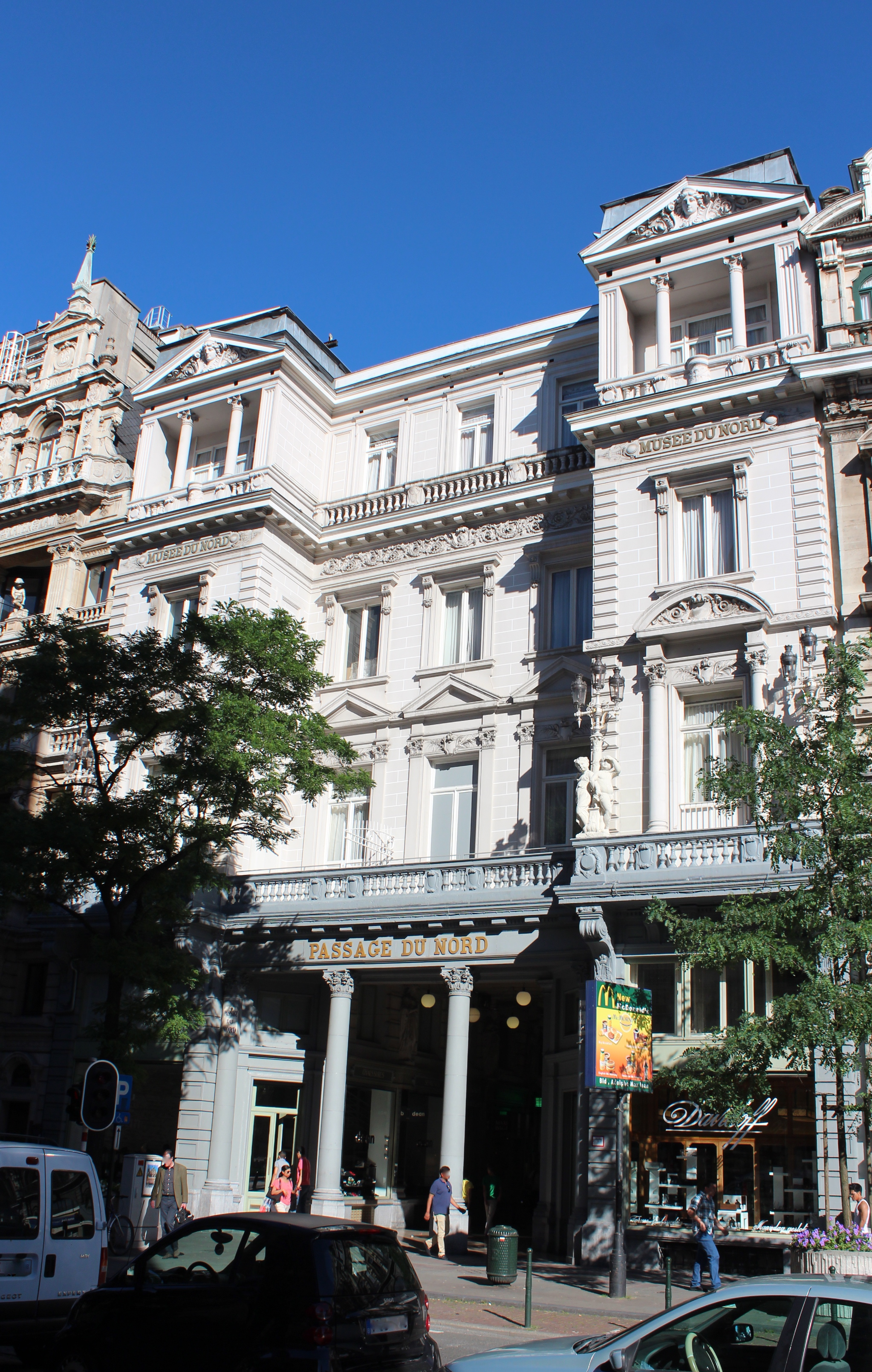
Entrance on the Boulevard Adolphe Max/Adolphe Maxlaan

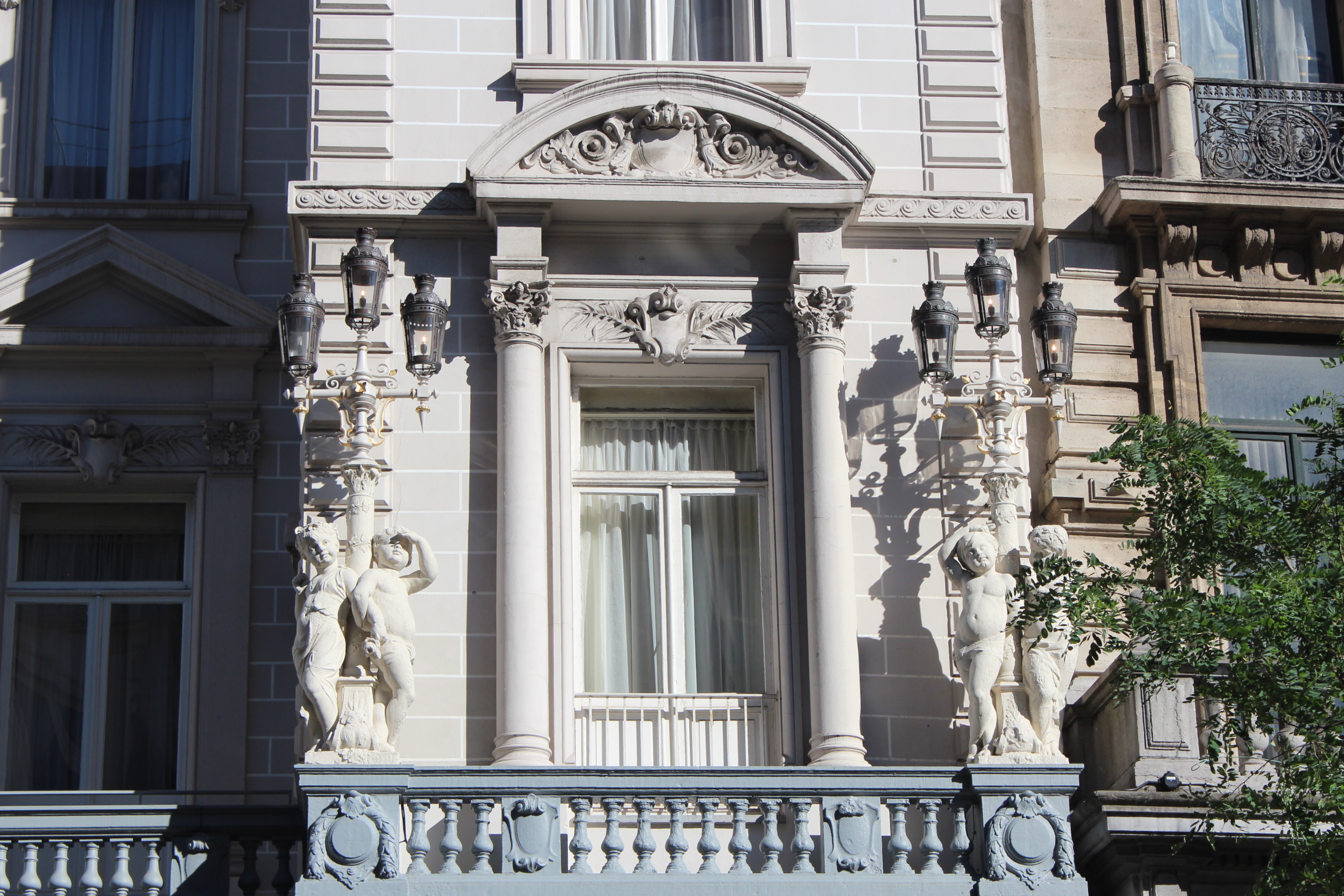
Detail of the façade, showing the ornate lampposts with putti

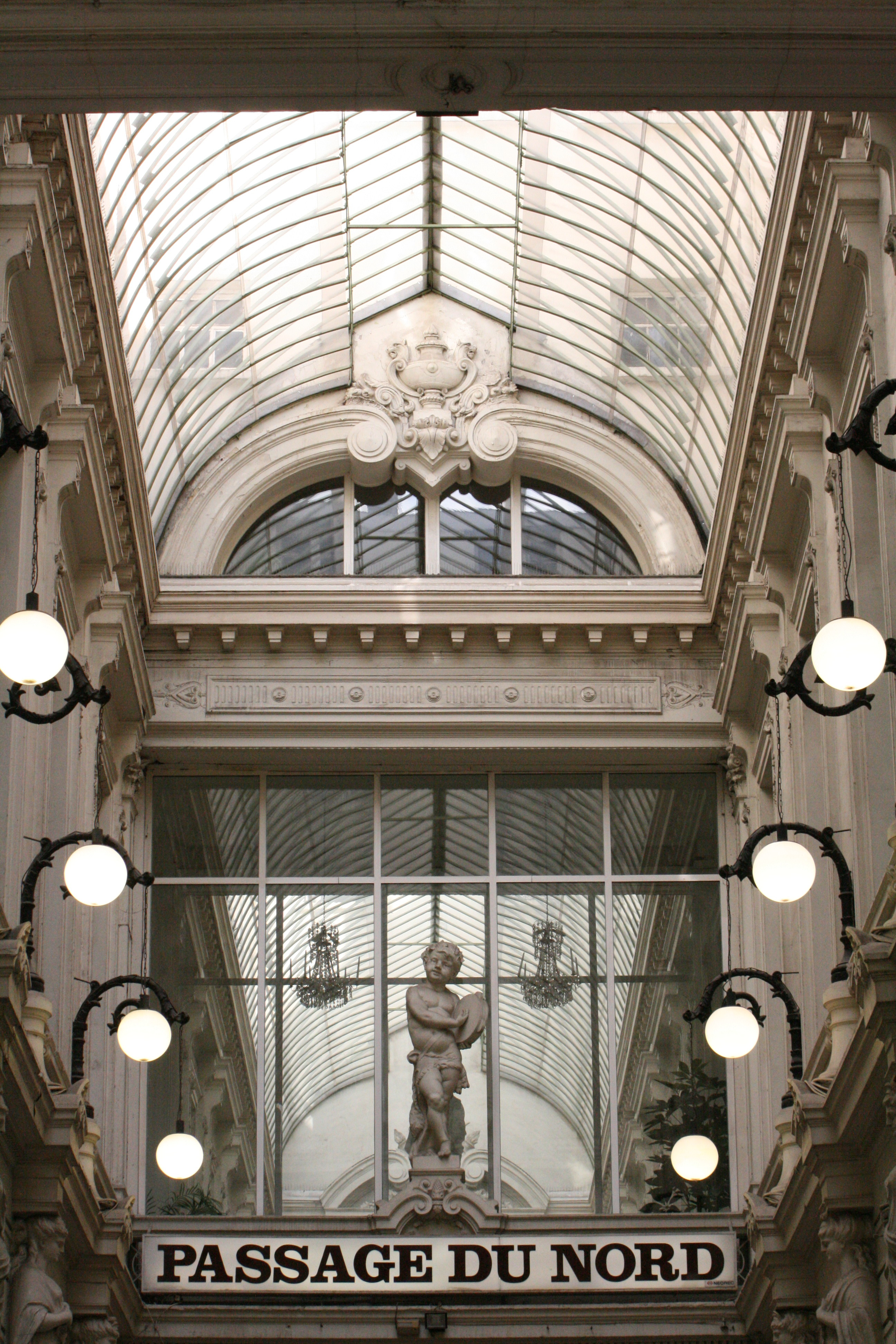
Glazed roof

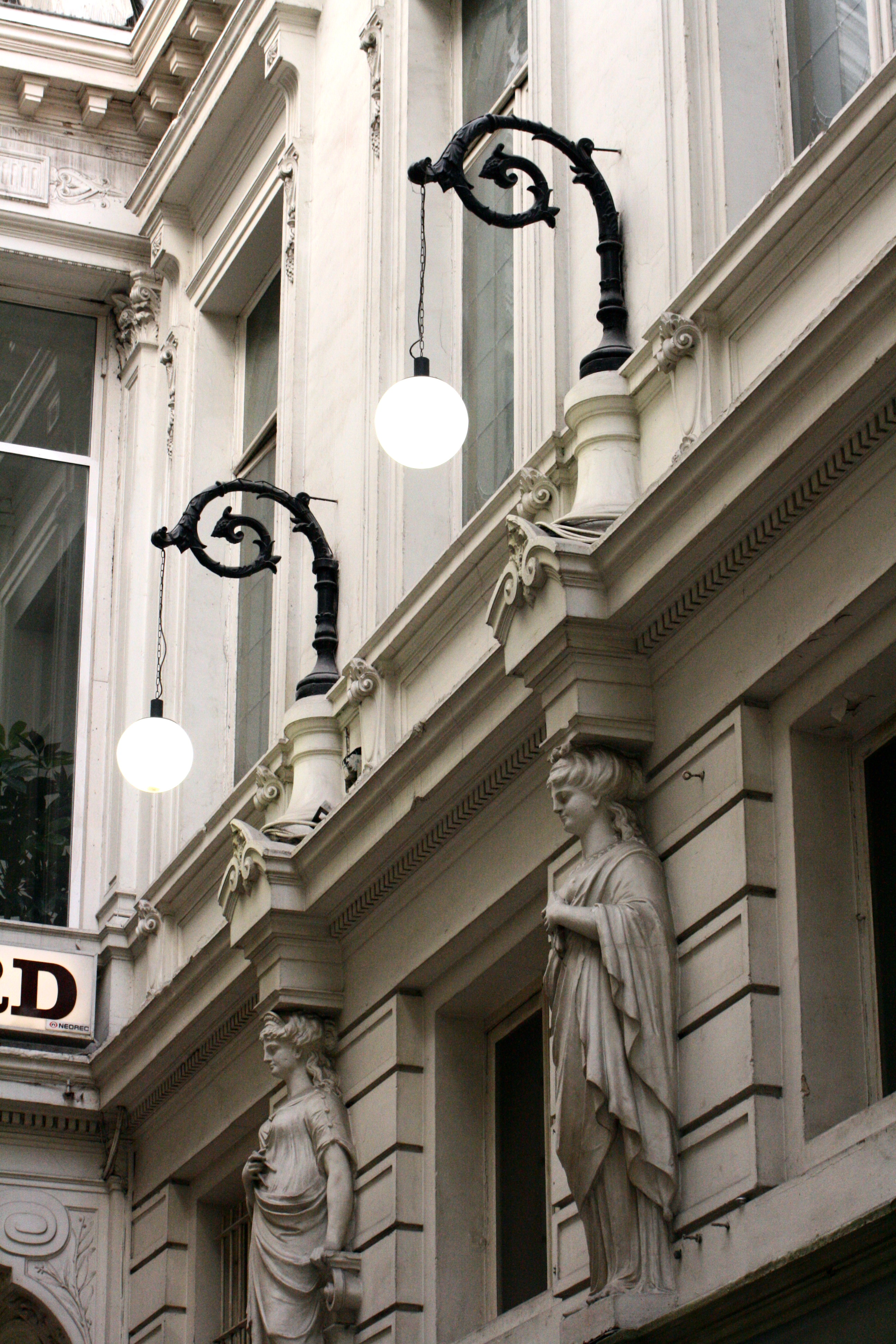
Hanging lamps and caryatids

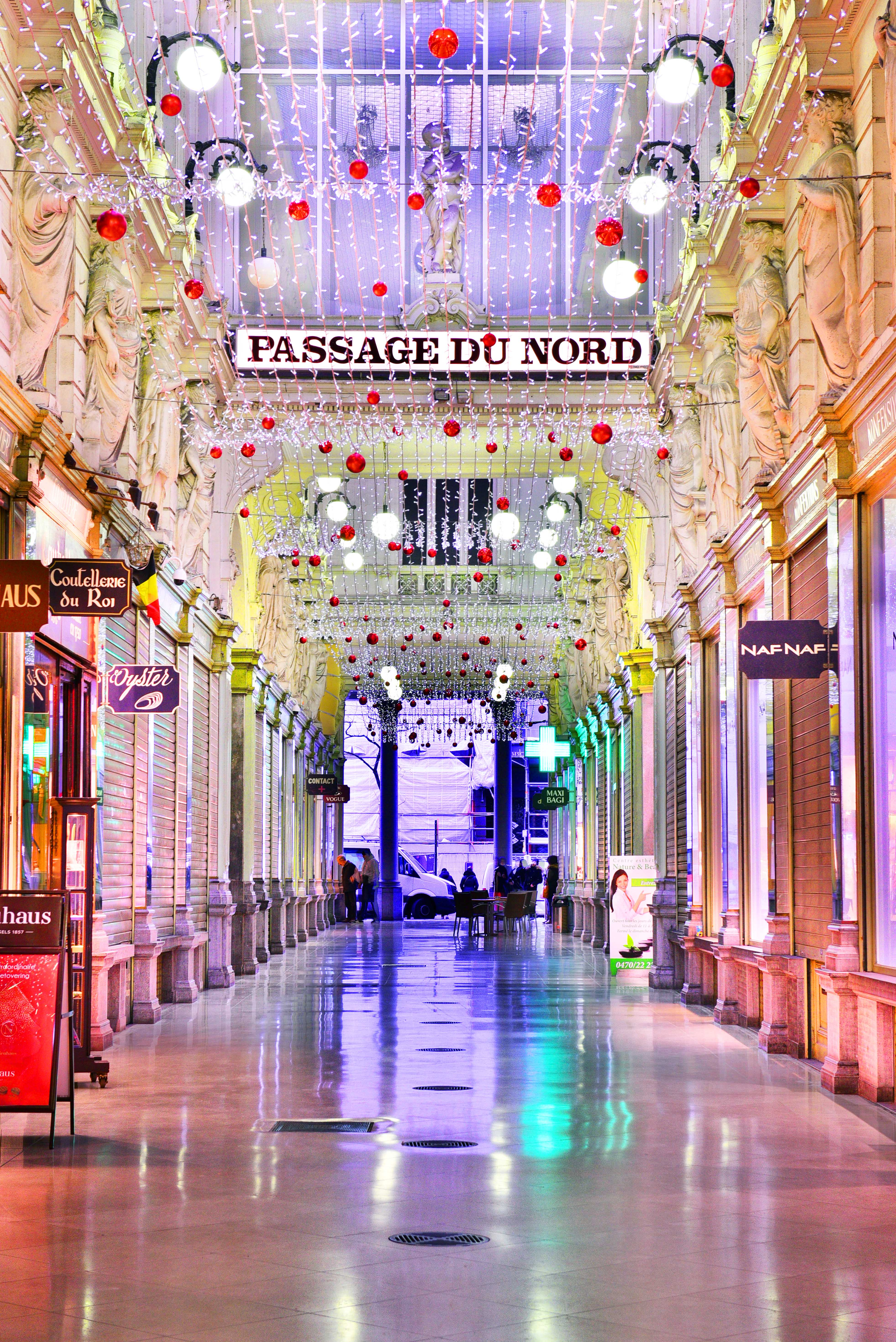
The gallery with Christmas decorations

== See also ==
- Arcade galleries in Brussels
- History of Brussels
- Culture of Belgium
- Belgium in the long nineteenth century
