= Albert Desenfans =

Belgian sculptor

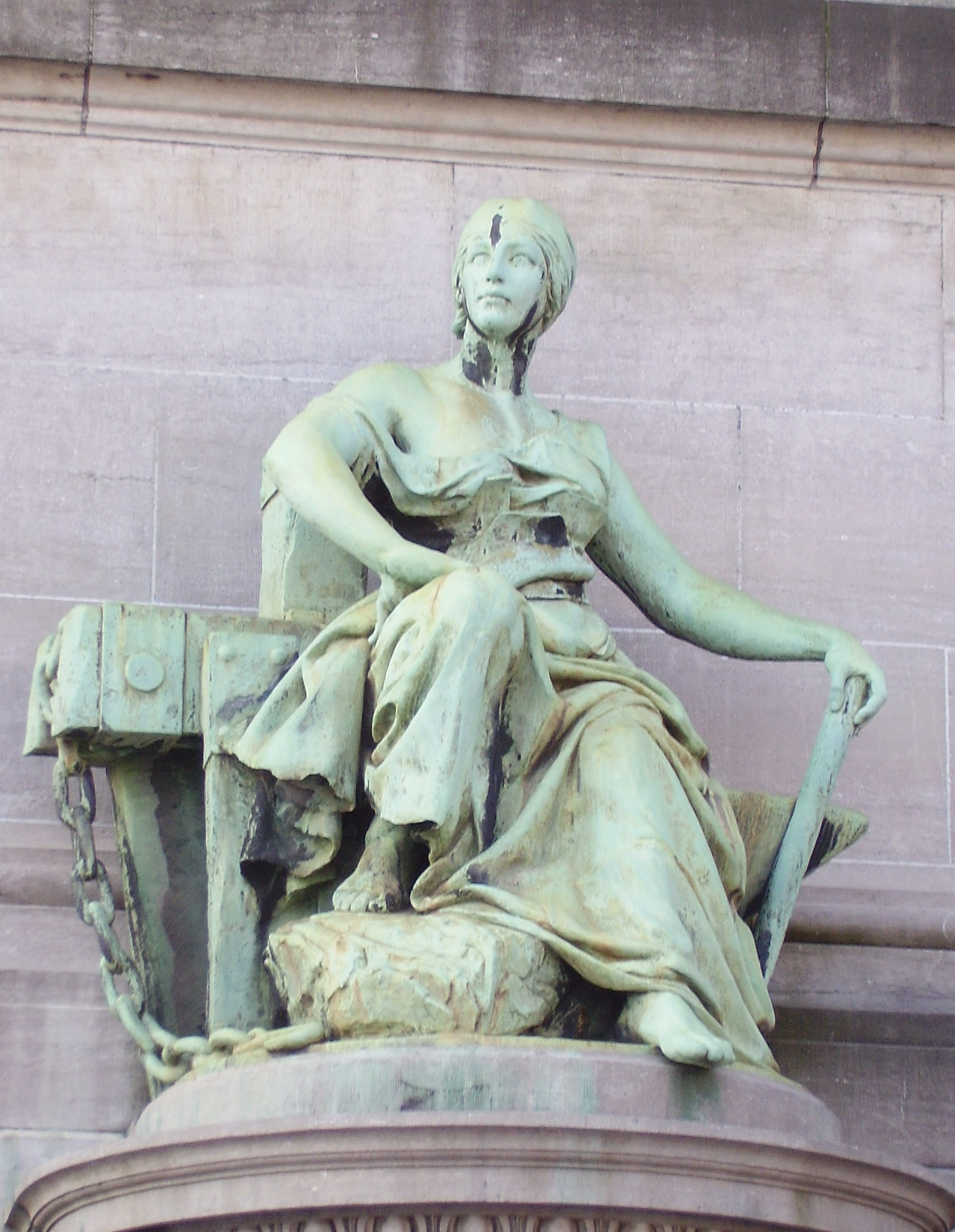
Province of Hainaut at the Parc du Cinquantenaire/Jubelpark, Brussels

Constant Albrecht (Albert) Desenfans (Genappe, 24 January 1845 – Braine-l'Alleud, 12 March 1938) was a Belgian sculptor.

== Life ==
Desenfans studied at the Académie Royale des Beaux-Arts in Brussels as a pupil of Eugène Simonis. Most of the work in his career is related to the building and public park projects of King Leopold II between 1870 and 1907. In his hometown of Schaerbeek, a street is named after him.

== Work ==
- Bronze figures of Hainaut and Limbourg, on the triumphal arch at the Parc du Cinquantenaire/Jubelpark, Brussels
- Figures of Day and Night in the Northern Gallery, Brussels
- Work at the Botanical Garden of Brussels
- Eve and the Serpent (1913) and other work at Josaphat Park, Schaerbeek
- Figure of Justice at the Palace of Justice, Brussels
