= Ravenstein Gallery =

Covered passageway in Brussels, Belgium

- Galerie Ravenstein (French); Ravensteingalerij (Dutch)
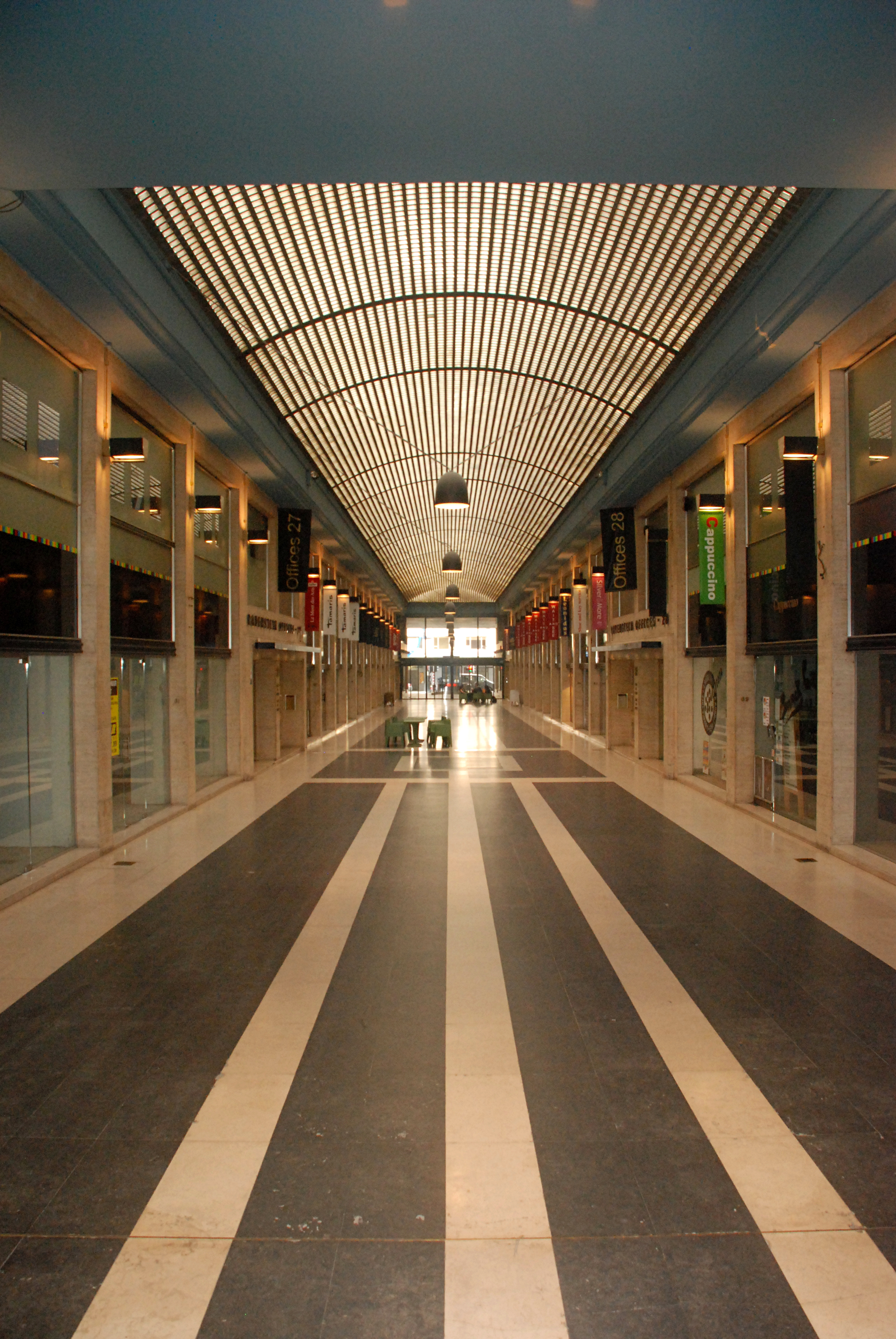
- Location: City of Brussels, Brussels-Capital Region, Belgium
- Coordinates: 50°50′41.438″N 4°21′30.179″E
- Opened: 15 February 1958
- Developer: L'immobilière Electrobel
- Architect: Alexis Dumont; Philippe Dumont
- Public transit: Brussels-Central; 1 5 Gare Centrale/Centraal Station

The Ravenstein Gallery (French: Galerie Ravenstein; Dutch: Ravensteingalerij) is a glazed shopping arcade in central Brussels, Belgium. It was designed and built by the architects Alexis and Philippe Dumont between 1954 and 1958 in the International Style. The gallery was inaugurated on 15 February 1958 by mayor Lucien Cooremans.

The gallery is situated between the Centre for Fine Arts and Brussels-Central railway station, to which it is connected. It is located next to Central Gate and not far from the Mont des Arts/Kuntsberg. It connects the Rue Ravenstein/Ravensteinstraat to the Cantersteen/Kantersteen, serving as an important pedestrian link between the upper and lower parts of the city.

== See also ==
- Arcade galleries in Brussels
- History of Brussels
- Culture of Belgium
