= Royal Saint-Hubert Galleries =

Covered passageways in Brussels, Belgium

- Galeries Royales Saint-Hubert (French); Koninklijke Sint-Hubertusgalerijen (Dutch)
- Location: City of Brussels, Brussels-Capital Region, Belgium
- Coordinates: 50°50′51″N 4°21′18″E
- Address: Rue du Marché aux Herbes / Grasmarkt 90
- Opened: 20 June 1847
- Architect: Jean-Pierre Cluysenaar
- Public transit: Brussels-Central; 1 5 Gare Centrale/Centraal Station
- Website: www.grsh.be/en/home

The Royal Saint-Hubert Galleries (French: Galeries Royales Saint-Hubert; Dutch: Koninklijke Sint-Hubertusgalerijen) is an ensemble of three glazed shopping arcades in central Brussels, Belgium. It consists of the King's Gallery (French: Galerie du Roi; Dutch: Koningsgalerij), the Queen's Gallery (French: Galerie de la Reine; Dutch: Koninginnegalerij) and the Princes' Gallery (French: Galerie des Princes; Dutch: Prinsengalerij).

The galleries were designed and built by the architect Jean-Pierre Cluysenaar between 1846 and 1847, and precede other famous 19th-century European shopping arcades, such as the Galleria Vittorio Emanuele II in Milan and the Passage in Saint Petersburg. Like them, they have twin, regular façades with distant origins in Vasari's long, narrow, street-like courtyard of the Uffizi in Florence. They feature glazed, arched shopfronts separated by pilasters and two upper floors, all in an Italianate style inspired by the Cinquecento, under an arched, glass-paned roof with a delicate cast-iron framework. The complex was designated a historic monument in 1986.

The galleries are located near the Grand-Place/Grote Markt (Brussels' main square), in the block between the Rue du Marché aux Herbes/Grasmarkt and the Rue de la Montagne/Bergstraat to the south and east, the Rue d'Arenberg/Arenbergstraat and the Rue de l'Ecuyer/Schildknaapsstraat to the north, and the Rue des Dominicains/Predikherenstraat and the Rue des Bouchers/Beenhouwersstraat to the west.

== Naming ==
The toponym comes from the old Rue Saint-Hubert/Sint-Huybrechtsstraet ("Saint-Hubert Street"), which linked the Rue du Marché aux Herbes/Grasmarkt to the Rue des Bouchers/Beenhouwersstraat. This 2-metre-wide (6.6 ft) street already existed in the 13th century, and was called Bogart or Bomgaard, meaning "Orchard Street". It was later also called Spiegelstraatken ("Mirror Lane"). The name Saint-Hubert appeared in 1685 because of a tavern bearing this saint's name, which was frequented by the stallholders from the nearby Marché aux Herbes.

The names of the three sections of the new passage were adopted on 4 December 1846 in honour of the Belgian royal family: the Galerie du Roi/Koningsgalerij ("King's Gallery"), the Galerie de la Reine/Koninginnegalerij ("Queen's Gallery") and the Galerie des Princes/Prinsengalerij ("Princes' Gallery"). The ensemble, originally called the Passage Saint-Hubert/Sint-Hubertusdoorgang ("Saint-Hubert Passage"), has borne its present name since 1965.

== History ==
=== Inception and construction ===
The Royal Saint-Hubert Galleries were designed by the young Dutch architect Jean-Pierre Cluysenaar, who determined to sweep away a warren of ill-lit alleyways between the Rue du Marché aux Herbes/Grasmarkt and the Rue Montagne aux Herbes Potagères/Warmoesberg and replace a sordid space where the bourgeoisie scarcely ventured into with a covered shopping arcade more than 200 m (660 ft) in length. His idea, conceived in 1836, was finally approved on 22 February 1845 by the municipal council, chaired by the city's then-mayor, Wyns de Raucourt. On 3 April, a royal decree authorised the work to begin.

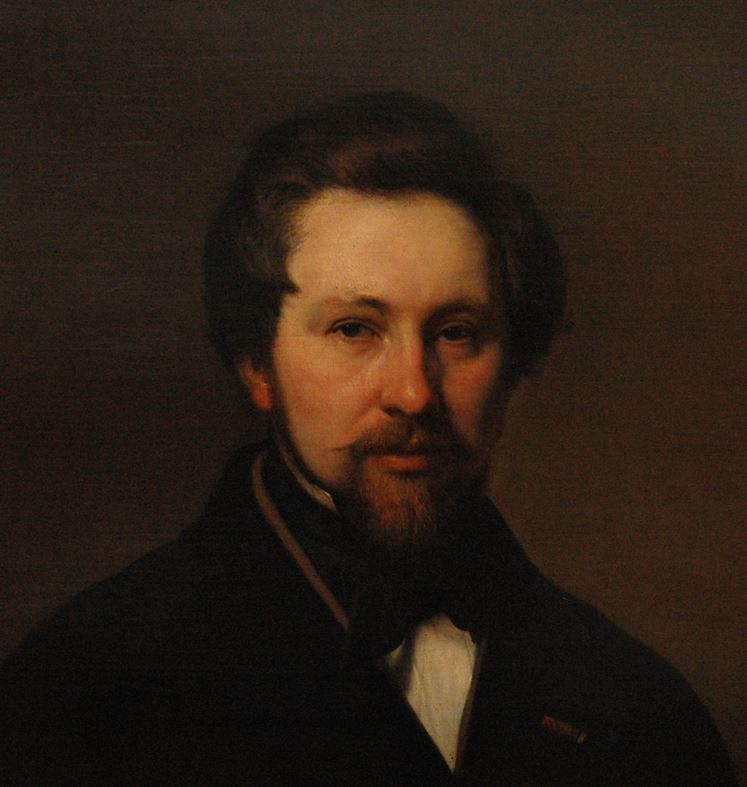
The Royal Saint-Hubert Galleries' architect, Jean-Pierre Cluysenaar

The project was supported by the public authorities through the establishment, in the summer of that year, of the Société anonyme des Galeries Saint-Hubert et de leurs embranchements, a partnership in which the banker Jean-André Demot took an interest, and whose shares were sold to private investors after being guaranteed a minimum interest rate by the authorities. This clever financial arrangement was a success, but nine years were required to disentangle all the property rights, assembled by rights of eminent domain, during a process that caused one property owner to die of a stroke, and a barber, it was said, to slit his throat as the adjacent house came down.

Construction started on 6 May 1846, lasting for thirteen months, and the 213-metre-long (699 ft) passage was inaugurated on 20 June 1847 by King Leopold I and his two sons. To emphasise the cooperation that existed between the various protagonists, Leopold was welcomed under the peristyle by the mayor and the members of the Societé. After the king had withdrawn, the crowd entered the galleries. Speeches and music enlivened the celebration.

=== Subsequent development ===
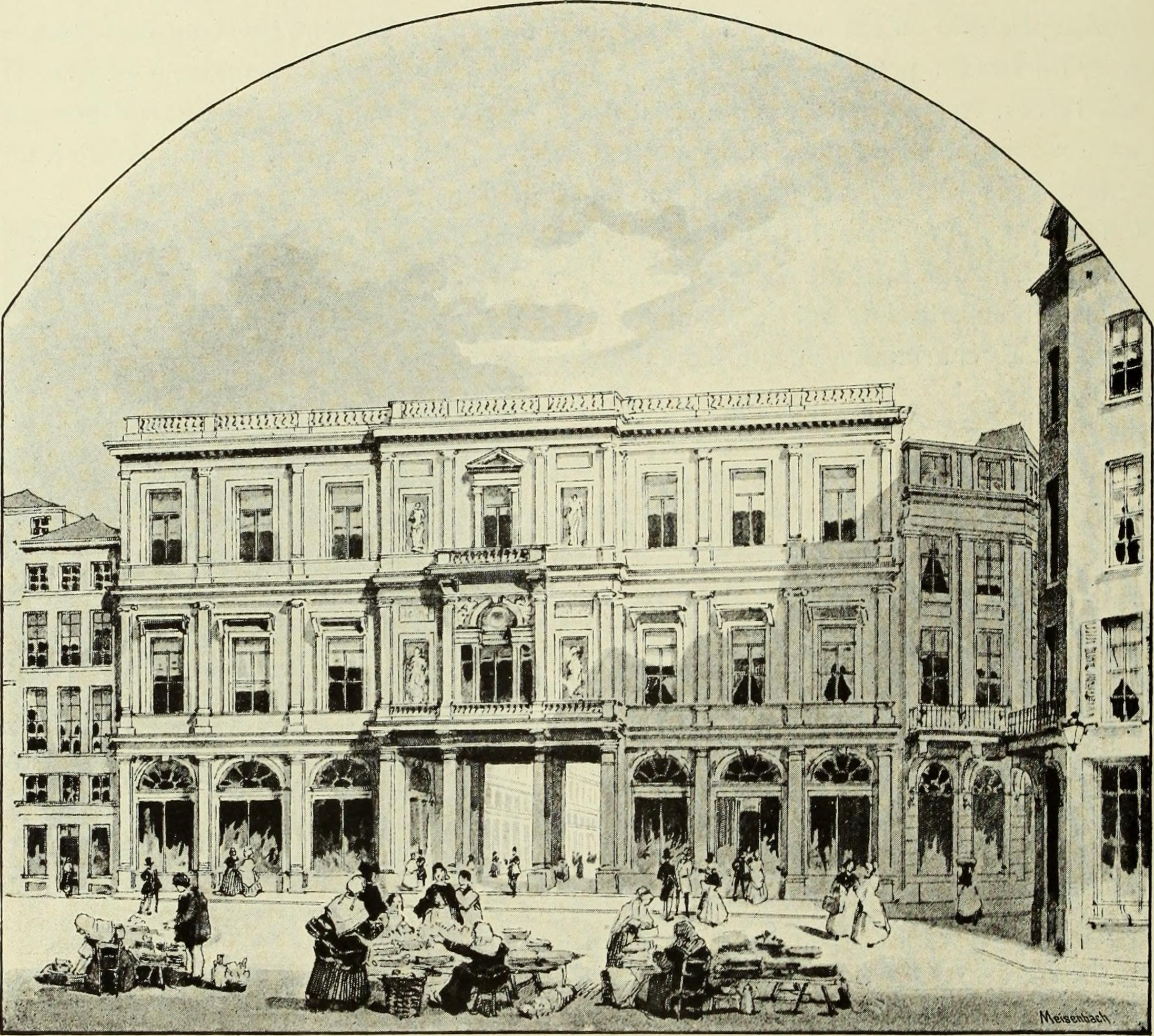
View of the south entrance to the galleries in 1884, illustration from Bruxelles à travers les âges

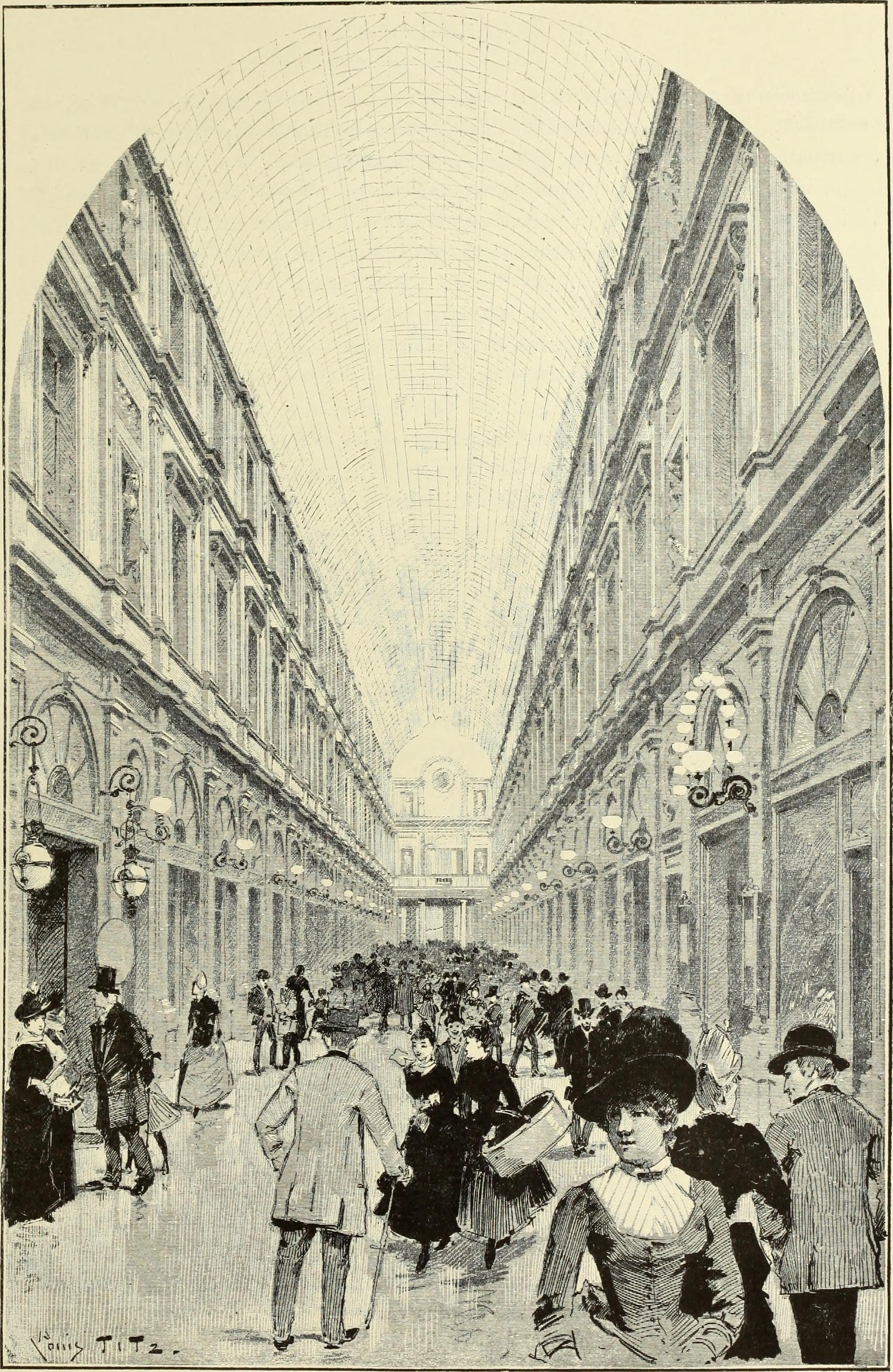
Interior view of the galleries in 1884

Under their motto Omnibus omnia ("Everything for everybody"), displayed on the pediment of their palace-like façade, the Saint-Hubert Galleries were an immediate success and became a popular meeting and strolling place for Brussels' residents and tourists. Equipped with artificial lighting, they offered the luxury of outdoor cafés in Brussels' inclement climate, alongside luxury retailers that brought to the city the feel of a European capital.

Over the years, the galleries became an artistic centre. The Taverne du Passage, called the Café des Arts until 1892, where the Cercle Artistique et Littéraire had its seat, was the meeting place for French writers of the time, including Victor Hugo, Alexandre Dumas, Charles Baudelaire, Paul Verlaine, Guillaume Apollinaire, and Edgar Quinet. Later, the surrealist painters and artists from the CoBrA movement were also regulars at the venue. On 1 March 1896, in the premises of La Chronique daily newspaper, the first public showing of moving pictures of the cinematographers Lumière took place, fresh from their initial triumph in Paris. A commemorative plaque recalls this event.

A theatre inside the King's Gallery, the Royal Theatre of the Galleries, was designed by Cluysenaar and opened 7 June 1847. It became one of three royal theatres of Brussels, alongside the Royal Theatre of La Monnaie and the Royal Park Theatre, playing operetta and revues. Its interior was rebuilt in 1950–51 by the architect Paul Bonduelle. Another theatre, the Théâtre du Vaudeville, located in the former premises of the Casino des Galeries Saint-Hubert inside the Queen's Gallery, where artists played vaudeville and intermède, was inaugurated in 1884. Still inside the Queen's Gallery, a cinema, the Cinéma des Galeries, was built in 1939 by Bonduelle.

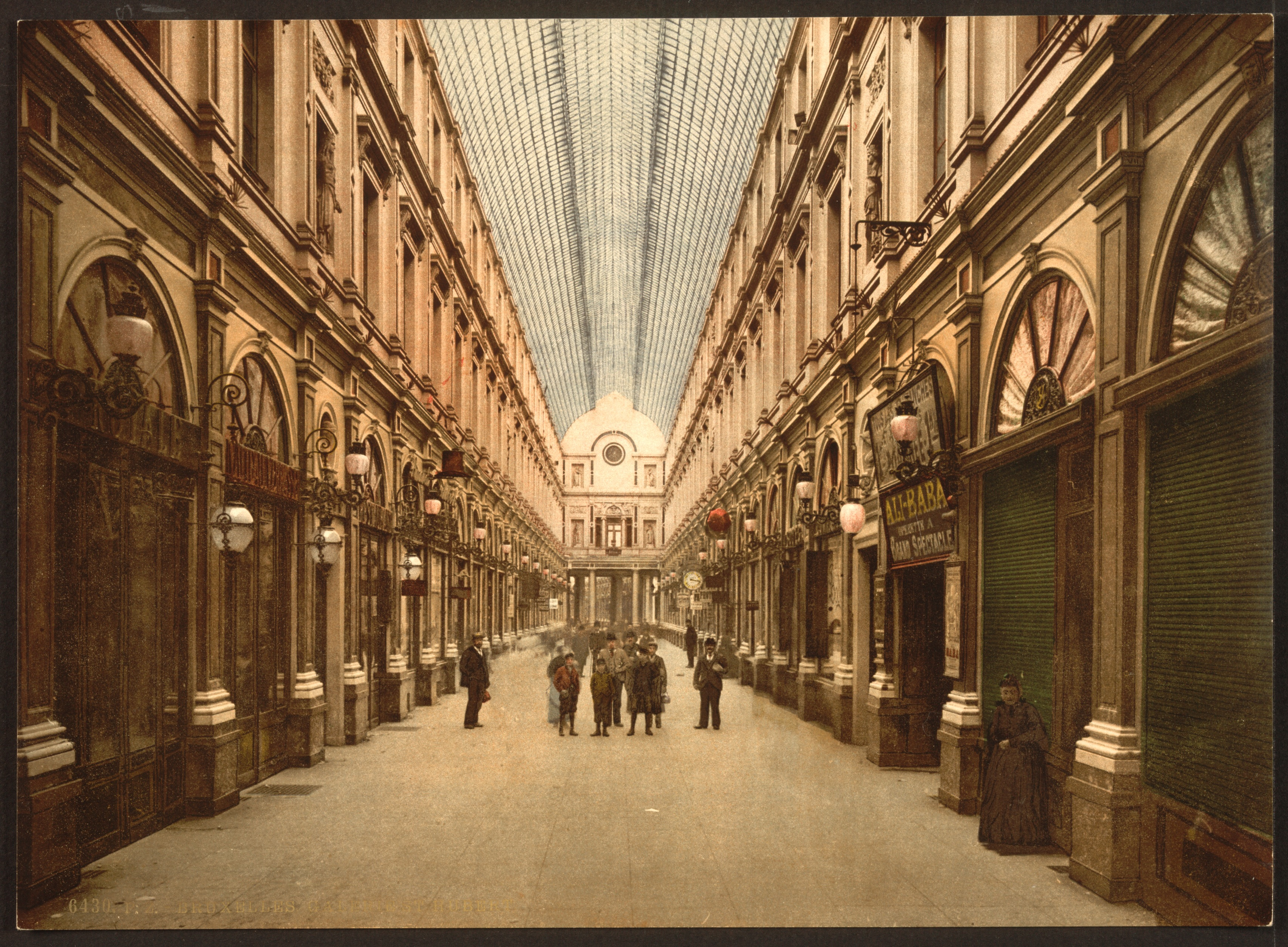
The Royal Saint-Hubert Galleries (King's Gallery pictured) in the late 19th century

=== Lasting success and protection ===
Unlike many passages, the Royal Galleries did not experience a period of neglect and their commercial success never waned, even if, after the opening of the Central Boulevards in the 1870s, a large number of luxury shops established themselves on the Rue Royale/Koningsstraat. Subsequently, whether through official or private visits, all monarchs, future monarchs, and members of the royal family have frequented (or still frequent) the galleries. For example, Queen Astrid was a regular at the Ganterie Italienne in the Queen's Gallery. And yet, it was not until 1969 that the galleries officially became "royal".

The galleries were designated a historic monument on 19 November 1986. They underwent extensive restoration in 1997 to mark their 150th anniversary. On that occasion, the original polychromy was restored, based on stratigraphic studies. In 2008, the galleries were submitted for World Heritage inscription and are included in UNESCO's "Tentative List" in the cultural heritage category. Still, the galleries continued to serve as the backdrop for major events and competitions. In 2019, the 106th Tour de France passed through them during its inaugural stages.

== Description ==
=== Inspiration and influence ===
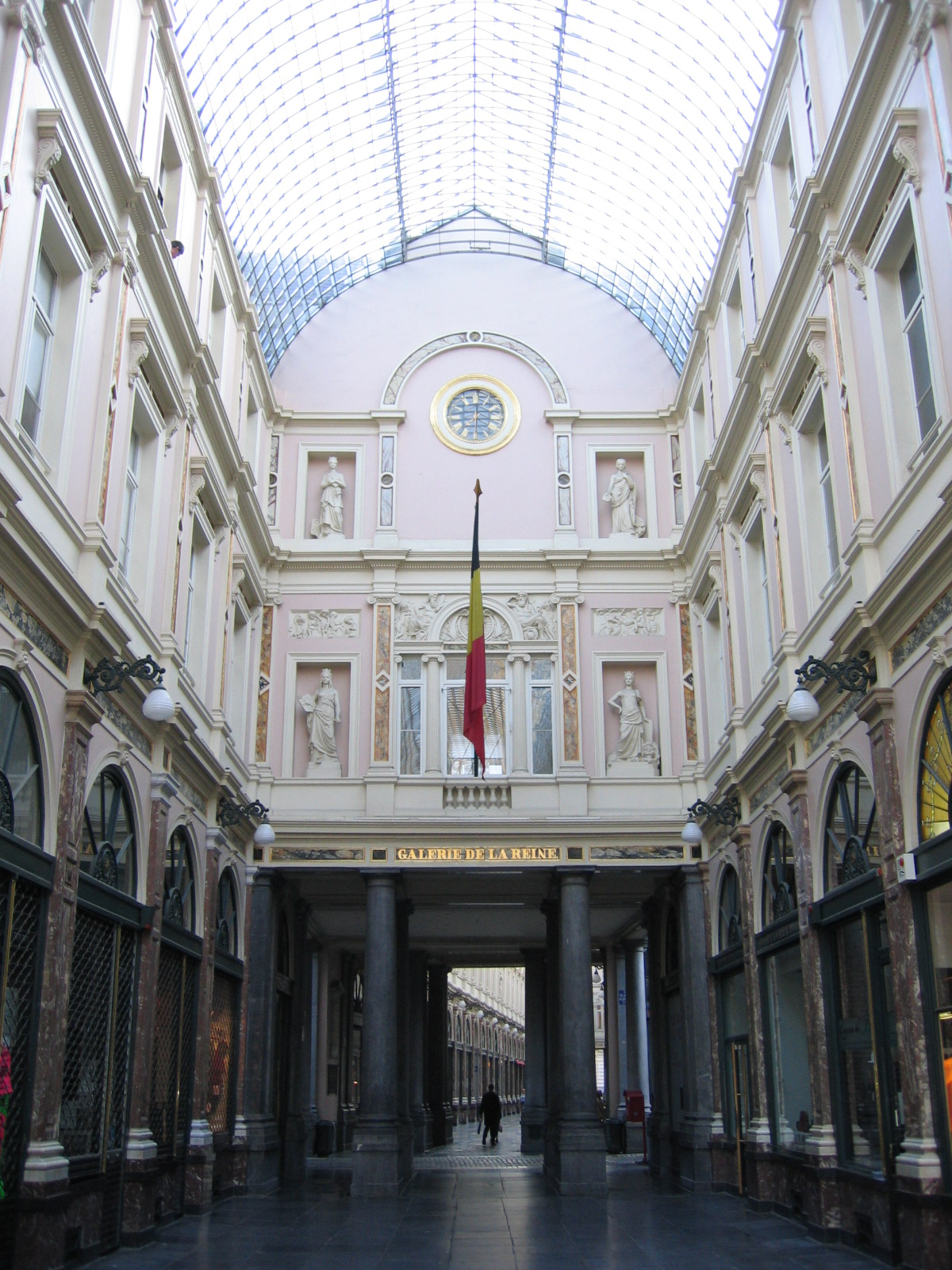
The galleries (Queen's Gallery pictured) are in an Italianate style inspired by the Cinquecento.

The Royal Galleries were the first covered galleries to be created by political will and built with financial guarantees and support from the authorities. As such, they are considered the first truly public covered galleries in Europe. Their interior architecture is directly inspired by the Galerie d'Orléans in the gardens of the Palais-Royal in Paris, designed by the architect Pierre-François-Léonard Fontaine and completed in 1831, whose dimensions were considerable for the time. Another major influence was the Passage Lemonnier in Liège, built between 1837 and 1839 by the architect Louis-Désiré Lemonnier, which replicates the two-level elevation of the Parisian passageway under a double-sided glass roof. Cluysenaar nevertheless radically innovated in the monumental proportions and the three-level elevation he gave to his galleries. Never before had such a long and high passage been achieved.

In turn, the Royal Galleries' dimensions and their monumental character made them a typological model that would be imitated by other famous 19th-century European shopping arcades: the Galleria Vittorio Emanuele II in Milan, built in 1867 by the architect Giuseppe Mengoni, was directly inspired by the Brussels model, following Mengoni's stay in the city and his meeting with Cluysenaar. The galleries of Naples, and later those of English industrial cities like Leeds or Manchester, those of Moscow, Saint Petersburg and Berlin, all would compete in gigantism, with the aspiration of being even bigger and more beautiful than the Royal Galleries.

=== Architecture ===
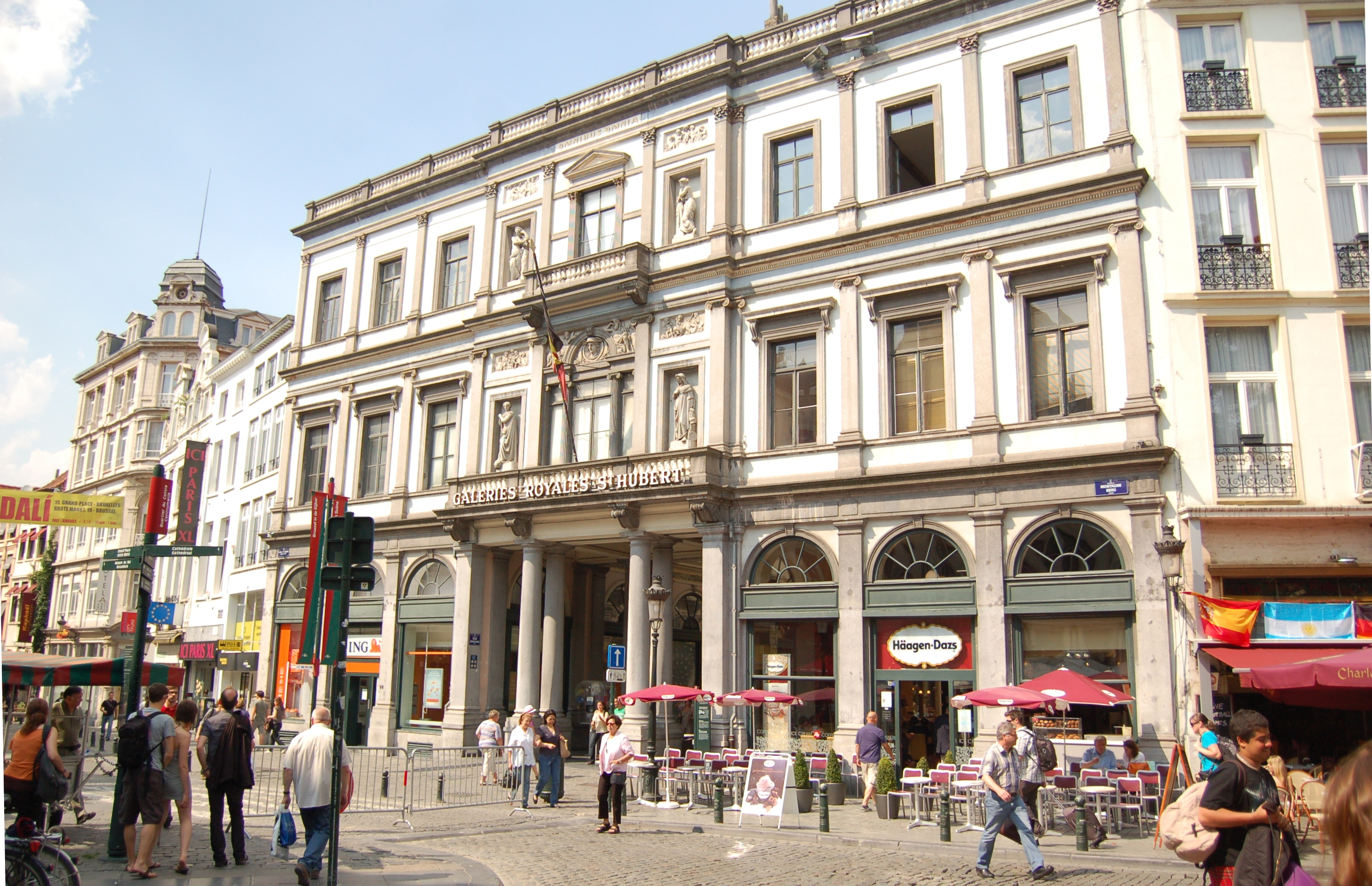
The south entrance on the Rue du Marché aux Herbes/Grasmarkt

Like their European counterparts, the Royal Galleries have twin, regular façades that can be traced back to the long, narrow, street-like courtyard of the Uffizi in Florence, designed by the architect Giorgio Vasari in the 16th century. These façades are coloured (pink and ochre) and decorated with faux-marble panels, whose vertical rhythm also comes from the superposition of three orders: Tuscan on the ground floor, Ionic on the first floor, and Corinthian on the second. They feature glazed, arched shopfronts separated by pilasters and two upper floors, all in an Italianate style inspired by the Cinquecento, under an arched, glass-paned roof with a delicate cast-iron framework.

The Royal Galleries' decoration is particularly opulent, in keeping with 19th-century eclecticism. The interior and exterior façades are adorned with allegorical sculptures and reliefs by Joseph Jaquet. Symbolising Trade and Industry towards the Rue du Marché aux Herbes/Grasmarkt, on the side of the Rue de l'Ecuyer/Schildknaapsstraat, they pay tribute to the institutions that made the galleries' construction possible.

Since construction, no significant transformation has altered the original façades—with the exception of slight changes made to the storefronts, which were adapted to the new businesses—thereby forming a coherent and prestigious urban entity. The street-like appearance exudes an ambiguity, the interior giving the illusion of the exterior. This scenography is complemented by the choice of historicist elements that clashes with the modernity of the materials and techniques used in the barrel-shaped glass roof, whose scale, form, and lightness make the space feel unique and bright. Once lit with gas candelabras, the galleries now boast LED scenographic lighting, allowing for sound and light projections.

=== Usage ===
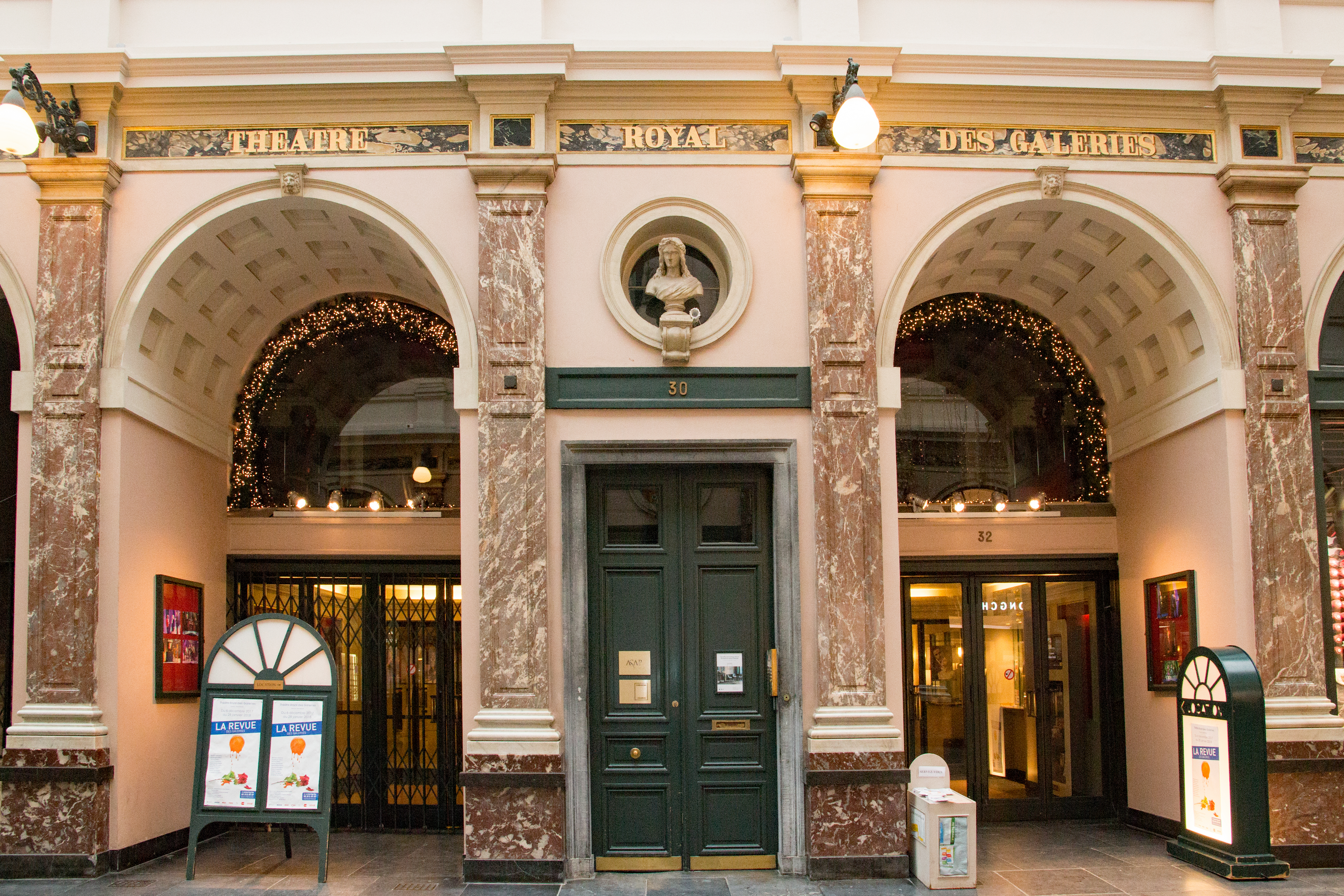
Current façade of the Royal Theatre of the Galleries

The galleries, which were long nicknamed "the umbrella of Brussels", are not only a place of commerce; their function is that of a lively street where people live, work, travel, and relax. The place combines two concepts: that of a public artery and a commercial space. It remains very lively, and is frequented by Brussels' residents and tourists alike. Chocolatiers, antique dealers, clothing stores, booksellers, and jewellers share some of the seventy shops that extend along both sides of the covered pedestrian walkway. A few restaurants and taverns, as well as a theatre and cinema, fill the remaining windows that run through the three passages. Apartments and offices occupy the upper floors above these shops and performance halls. The owners, who are descendants of the galleries' founders, continue to manage the premises while preserving the social mixing intended by Cluysenaer.

The galleries are also used as a setting for more ad hoc festivities and cultural events, including film shoots, private dinners and exhibitions. Behind the walls, dance and watercolour classes, philosophical talks, and artistic workshops are regularly organised. The annual Christmas decorations, part of the city's broader "Winter Wonders" event, are also a highlight.

== Galleries ==
The Royal Galleries consist of two major sections, each more than 100 metres (330 ft) in length and 8.3 metres (27 ft) in width—respectively called the Galerie du Roi/Koningsgalerij, meaning "King's Gallery", and the Galerie de la Reine/Koninginnegalerij, meaning "Queen's Gallery"—and a smaller side gallery: the Galerie des Princes/Prinsengalerij, meaning "Princes' Gallery". The main sections (King's and Queen's Gallery) are separated by a peristyle at the point where the Rue des Bouchers/Beenhouwersstraat crosses the gallery complex. At this point, there is a discontinuity in the straight perspective of the galleries. This "bend" was introduced purposefully in order to make the long vista, with its repetition of arches, pilasters and windows, less tedious.

=== King's Gallery ===
The King's Gallery (French: Galerie du Roi, Dutch: Koningsgalerij) stretches from the Rue des Bouchers to the Rue d'Arenberg/Arenbergstraat and the Rue de l'Ecuyer/Schildknaapsstraat. It notably houses the Royal Theatre of the Galleries. Between 2011 and 2015, it was also home to the Museum of Letters and Manuscripts, which honoured the greatest men and women of art, history, music, the humanities and science.

=== Queen's Gallery ===
The Queen's Gallery (French: Galerie de la Reine, Dutch: Koninginnegalerij), to the south, leads to the Rue du Marché aux Herbes/Grasmarkt, near the Grand-Place/Grote Markt, and on the other side of this street begins the Horta Gallery. The longest of the galleries, its best known shops are Delvaux leather goods and Neuhaus chocolatier, which is the birthplace of the praline. It also houses the Théâtre du Vaudeville, the Cinéma des Galeries and the Taverne du Passage restaurant.

=== Princes' Gallery ===
The Princes' Gallery (French: Galerie des Princes, Dutch: Prinsengalerij) is located perpendicularly between the King's Gallery and the Rue des Dominicains/Predikherenstraat. Smaller and more sober in its design, but without disrupting the harmony, it is home to Tropismes bookshop, housed in the former Café des Princes.

Overview of the Queen's Gallery

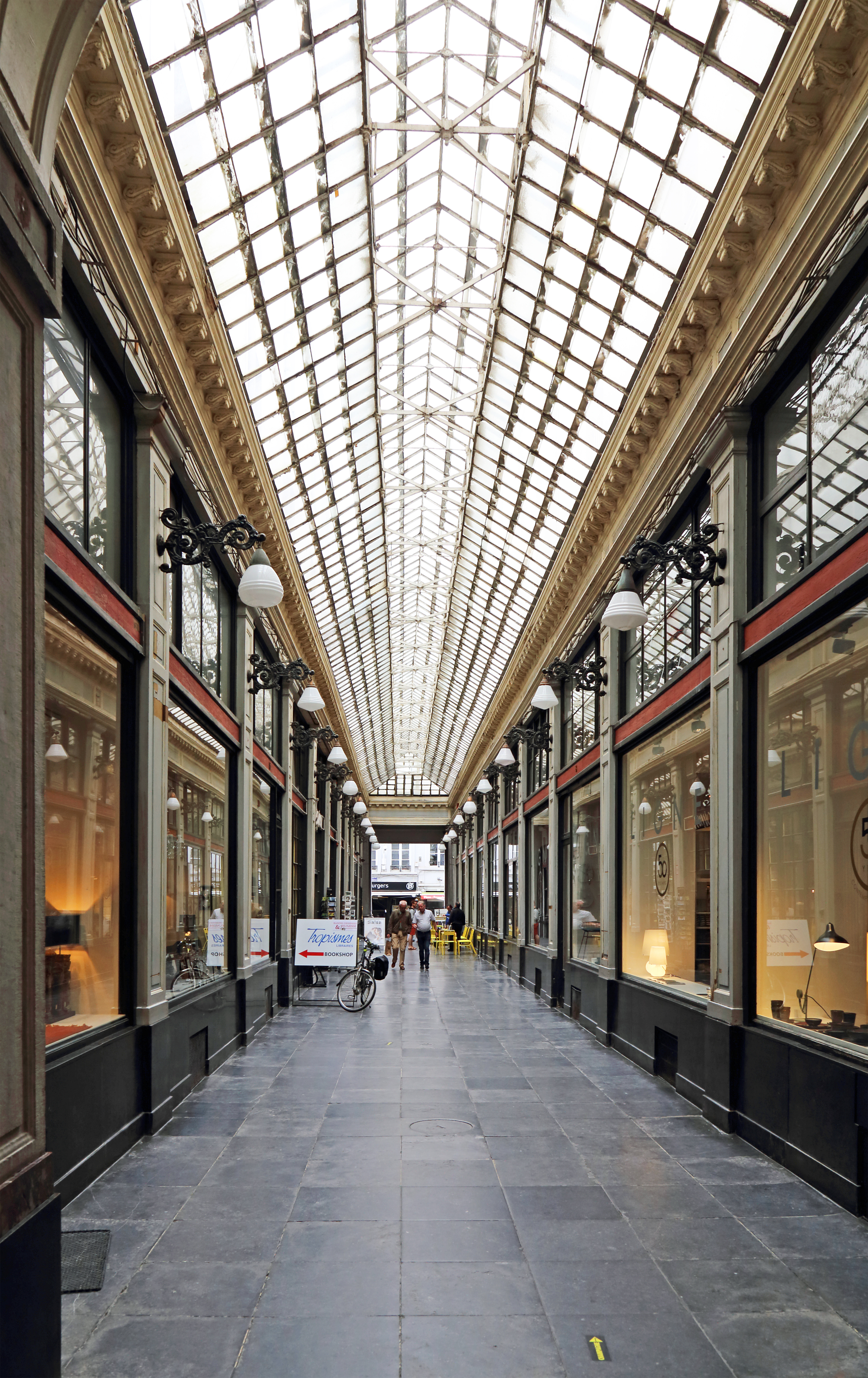
The small side of the Princes' Gallery

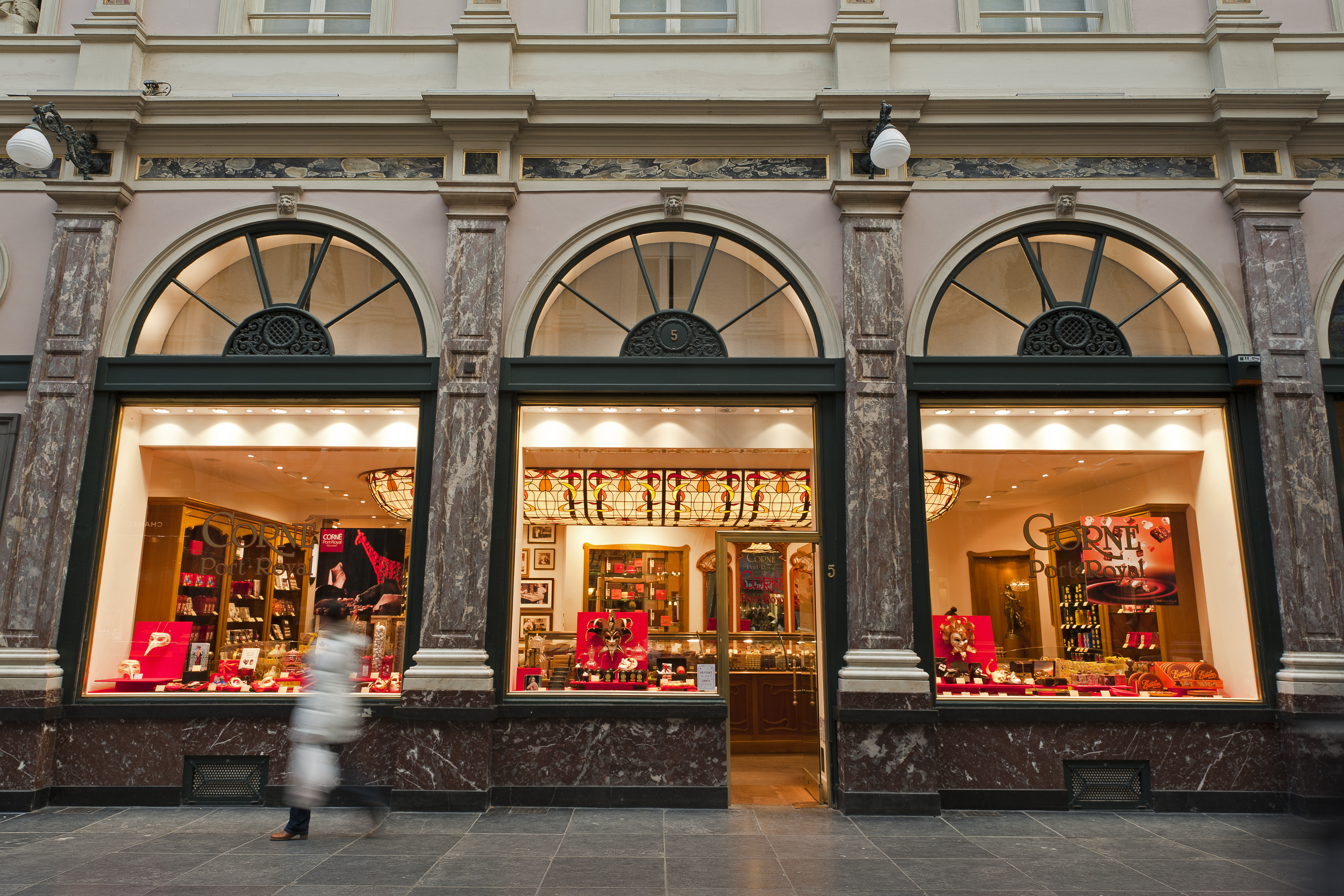
Chocolate store

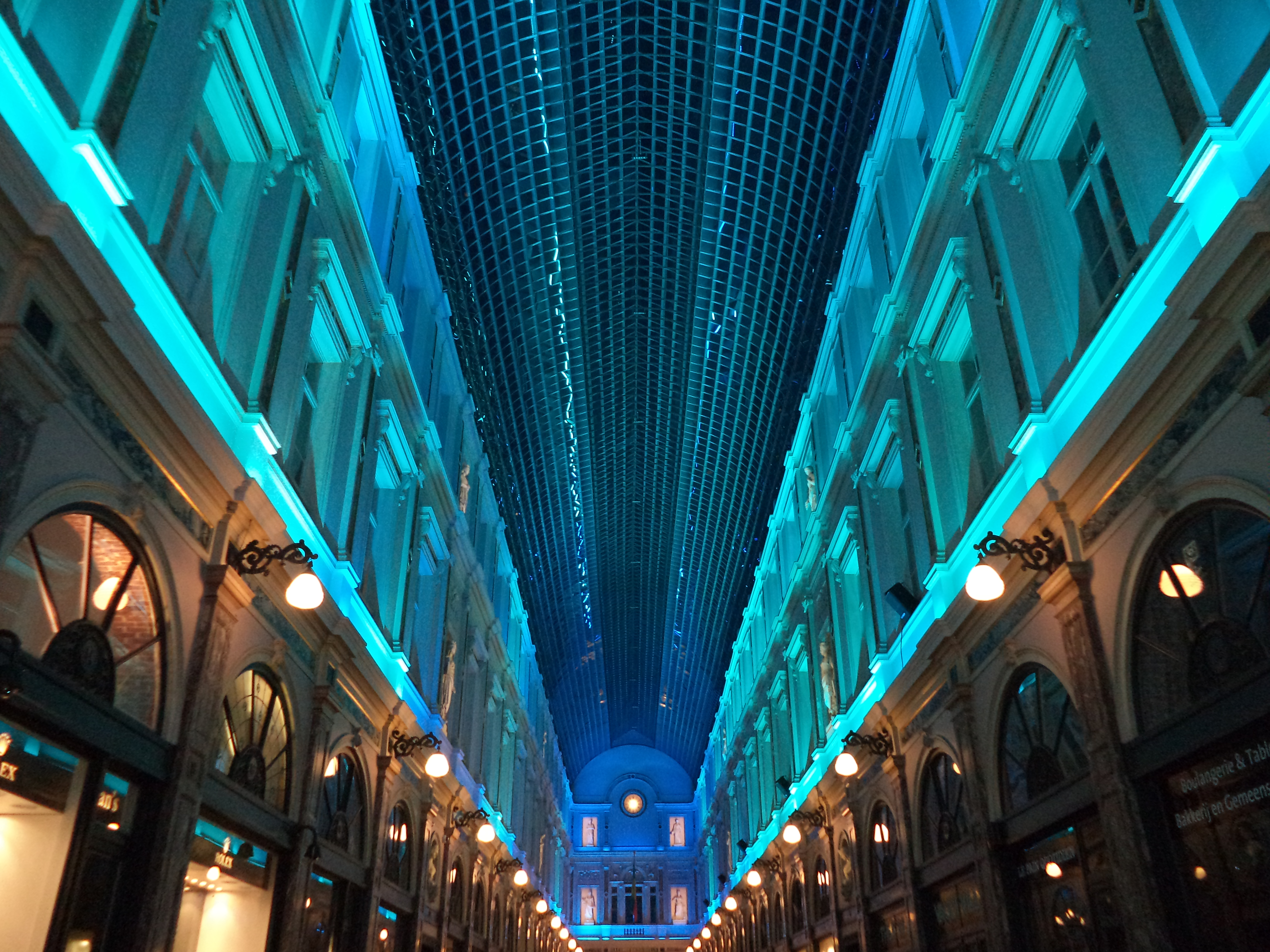
Light show organised for the 170th anniversary of the galleries in 2017

== See also ==
- Arcade galleries in Brussels
- History of Brussels
- Culture of Belgium
- Belgium in the long nineteenth century
