= Anne Cluysenaar =

Belgian-born Irish poet, writer and academic (1936–2014)

- Born: Anne Alice Andrée Cluysenaar; 15 March 1936; Brussels, Belgium
- Died: 1 November 2014 (aged 78); Llantrisant, Monmouthshire, Wales, UK
- Citizenship: Irish
- Education: Trinity College, Dublin; University of Edinburgh
- Occupations: Poet, lecturer, writer
- Spouse: Walter Freeman Jackson
- Writing career
- Pen name: Anne Jackson
- Language: English

Anne Alice Andrée Cluysenaar (15 March 1936 – 1 November 2014) was a Belgian-born poet and writer, who was a citizen of Ireland. She lived for much of her life in the UK, latterly in Wales, and published and edited several volumes of verse. She was a member of the Cluysenaar family, and was murdered by her stepson during a family argument.

== Life and career ==
Anne Cluysenaar was born in Brussels, the daughter of artist John Cluysenaar and his wife, Sybil Fitzgerald Hewat, a painter. Both her parents were of Scottish and Belgian descent. Her grandfather, painter André Cluysenaar, was the grandson of architect Jean-Pierre Cluysenaar.

Anne Cluysenaar moved with her family to Britain just before the start of the Second World War, and started writing poems as a child. The family lived initially in Somerset, and she was educated in boarding schools in England and Scotland, before moving to Ireland in 1950.

After her parents returned to Belgium she studied English and French Literature at Trinity College, Dublin, winning the Vice-Chancellor's prize for poetry in 1956 and graduating in 1957. She took out Irish citizenship in 1961, and her verse was published in the 1963 collection New Poets of Ireland. In 1963, she gained a diploma in general linguistics at the University of Edinburgh.

She became a lecturer in literature, linguistics, and creative writing, at various universities in England and Scotland, including Manchester (1957–58), Aberdeen (1963–65), Lancaster (1965–71), Birmingham (1973–76), and Sheffield City Polytechnic (1976–89). She also spent a period as reader to the partially sighted critic Percy Lubbock, and worked for a time at the Chester Beatty Library of Oriental Manuscripts in Dublin. From 1990 on, she taught creative writing on a part-time basis at the University of Wales, Cardiff. From the 1970s until her death, she also ran workshops in museums, galleries, schools, community centres and elsewhere.

She established two literary magazines, Scintilla and Sheaf, and published more than a dozen volumes of her own verse, including A Fan of Shadows (1967), Nodes (1969), Double Helix (1982), Timeslips (1997), Batu-Angas: Envisioning Nature with Alfred Russel Wallace (2008), Water to Breathe (2009), and Touching Distances: Diary Poems (2014). Her poems appeared in several anthologies. She was Chair of the Verbal Arts Association between 1983 and 1986, and was active in the Poetry Society. Her interest in Wallace was reflected in her Foreword to Wildlife in Gwent - Post Millennium by Colin Titcombe (2006).

She co-founded the Usk Valley Vaughan Association, and edited The Selected Poems of Henry Vaughan. In 2001 she was elected as a Fellow of the Welsh Academy. She wrote the scripts for two son-et-lumière shows, Echoes in Stone and Footsteps on the Sands of Time performed at Tintern Abbey and Caldicot Castle respectively, and contributed verse as part of Chepstow's regeneration scheme, engraved on paving and walls in the town centre in 2005.

In later years she ran a smallholding at Little Wentwood Farm near Llantrisant, Monmouthshire, the home she shared with her husband, Walter Freeman Jackson; whom she married in 1976.

== Death ==
Her death was reported by Gwent Police under her married name of Anne Jackson, after her body was found at her home near Usk on 1 November 2014. Her stepson, Timothy Jackson, aged 48, appeared in Newport Magistrates Court on 4 November charged with her murder and was remanded in custody. At her inquest, it was reported that she had died from stab wounds to her neck and chest. Jackson initially pleaded not guilty to her murder, but changed his plea to guilty at Cardiff Crown Court on 24 February 2015. It was said that he had developed an irrational hatred of his stepmother and had killed her with a kitchen knife during an argument. On 26 March, Jackson was sentenced to life imprisonment for the murder, and was told by Judge Neil Bidder that he would serve at least 19 years before being eligible for parole. His sentence was later reduced to 16 years and 8 months on appeal.

In August 2015, a ceramic plaque in her memory was unveiled in the Owain Glyndwr Field in Usk.
