= Alfred Cluysenaar =

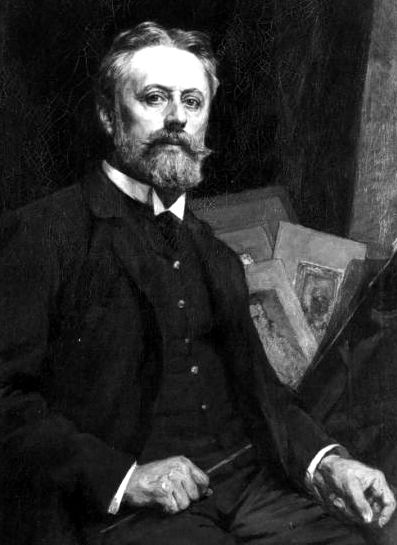
Self-portrait (date unknown)

Alfred Jean Andre Cluysenaar (24 September 1837 in Brüssel – 23 November 1902 in Saint-Gilles) was a Belgian portrait painter.

Jean Alfred was a member of the Cluysenaar family, an artistic family from Brussels. He is the son of Jean-Pierre Cluysenaar and Elisabeth Puttaert. He became the father of the painter André Cluysenaar.

He studied in the Académie Royale des Beaux-Arts of Brussels in the atelier of Joseph Jaquet and François-Joseph Navez. He painted some important decorations in the Royal Zoo of Antwerp and in 1861–1876 he ornated the Aula in Ghent. Cluysenaar was famous for his monumental decorations of high quality. Awarded in the expositions of Brussels, Ghent, Paris Vienna and London. Some of his paintings are kept in the Royal Museum of Fine Arts Antwerp.

== Functions ==
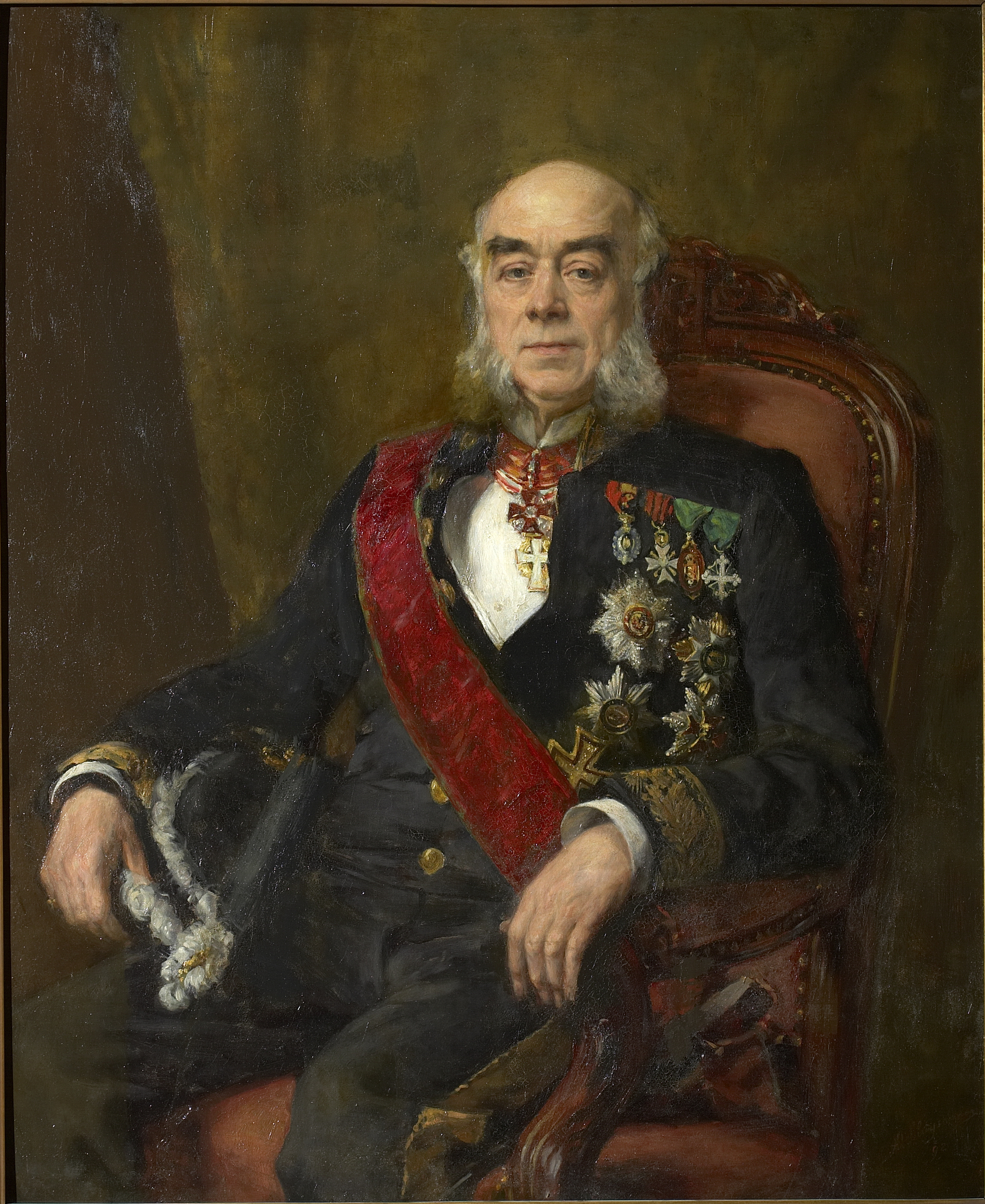
Henri 't Kint de Rodenbeke, President of the Senate

- 1892–?: Director of the Academie de Beaux arts of St-Gilles.
- Member of the Société Royale Belge des Aquarellistes.

== Works ==
- ca 1892: Marie Camille Louis de Gonzague de Tornaco, portrait in the Senate.
- 1892: Count Henri 't Kint de Roodenbeke, portrait in the Senate.
- 1885: Le prince Albert et la princesse Joséphine, Royal Collection.

== Honours ==
- Knight in the Order of Leopold.
- Officer in the Legion of Honour.
