= Marquis of Lede =

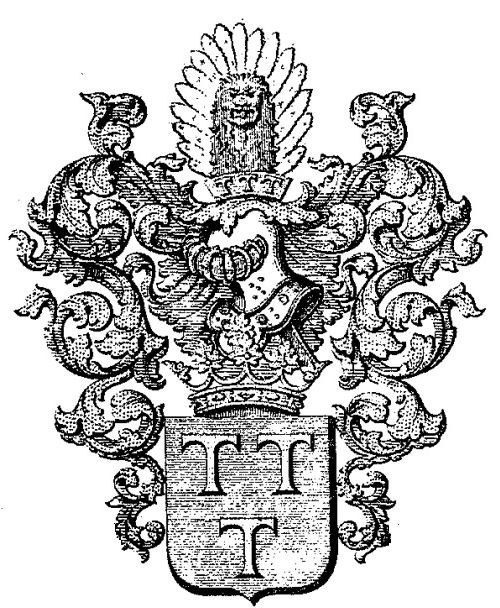
Coat of the House of de Bette

Coat of Arms of the House of Bette

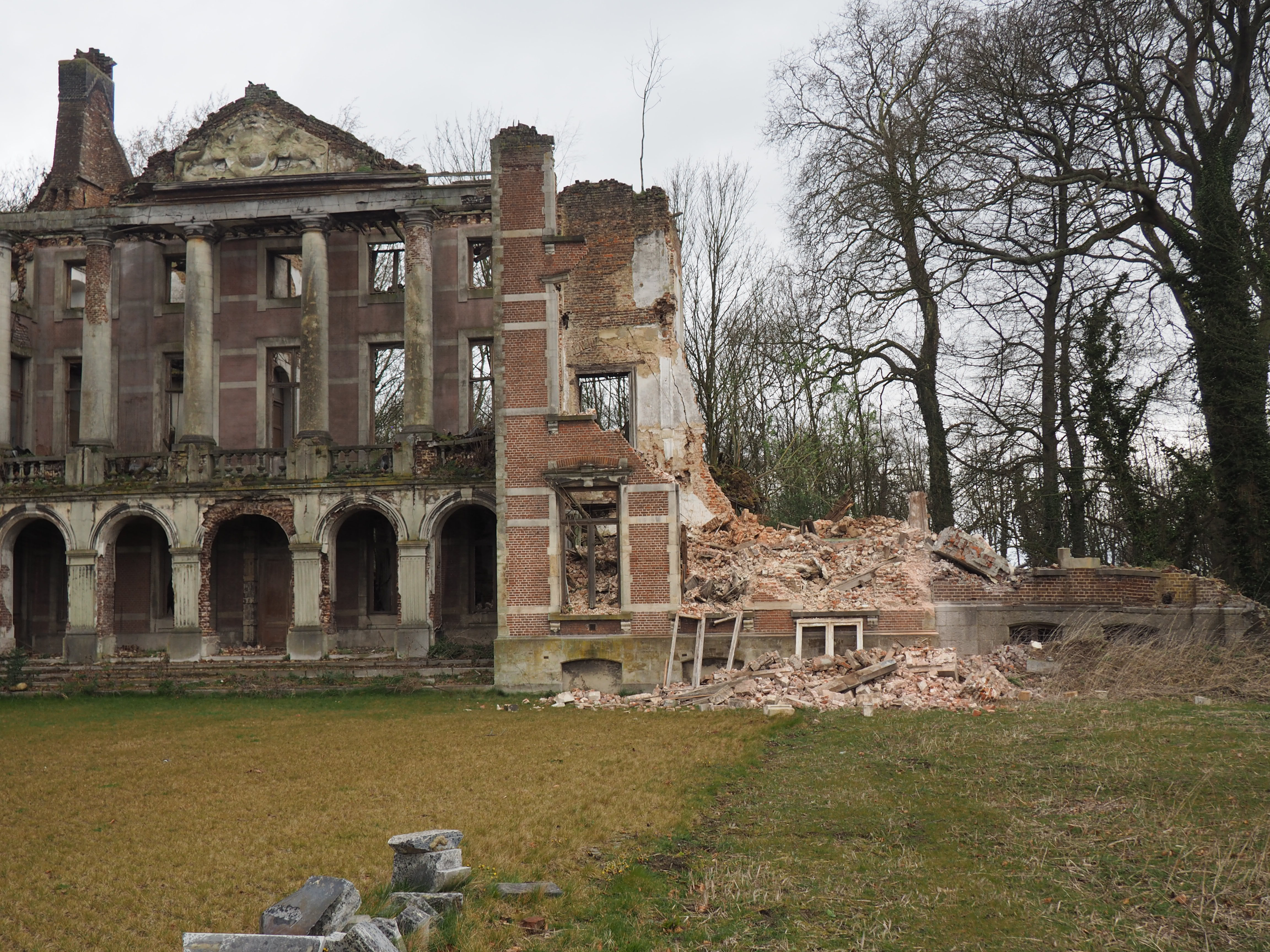
Mesen Castle, residence of the Marquess of Lede, designed by Giovanni Niccolò Servandoni

The Marquess of Lede (Spanish: Marquesado de Lede) was a Flemish title in use during the Ancien Régime. Lede is a city in Flanders, Belgium.

== History ==
Jacques, son of Adrian Bette, Lord of Angrelles inherited the Heerlijkheid of Lede, of his father in law Jean de Gruutere (1501 - 1556). By Spanish Royal decree the Heerlijkheid was elevated to a barony. And finally the title Marquess of Lede was created on 3 August 1633 by King Felipe IV for Guillaume de Bette, 1st Marquess of Lede after his participation in the Capture of Maastricht. The title was passed from generation to generation until the last Marquess died, the only relative was Maximilien Carnin de Staden, who died in Mesen Castle.

== Marquesses of Lede ==
Jacques Bette (1521–1591):
Married to Isabeau de Gruutere, Lady of Lede.

  1. John Bette, Baron of Lede:
    Married to Joanne of Glymes-Berghes.
    1. Guillaume de Bette, 1st Marquess of Lede:
      married to Anna Marie de Hornes-Bassignies.
      1. Ambroise Auguste de Bette, 2nd Marquess of Lede, (1640–1677):
        Married to Dorothea of Croy.
        1. Jean François de Bette, 3rd Marquess of Lede, Grandee of Spain and Knight of the Golden Fleece:
          Married to Anne Marie of Croy.
          1. Emmanuel-Ferdinand-François de Bette, 4th Marquess of Lede, died in 1779: last Marquess of Lede.
        2. Felipe-Emmanuel de Bette (1677–1742), knighted in the Order of Santiago
        3. Ignace II de Bette: Canon at Liege Cathedral.
        4. Honorina Maria de Bette:
          Married in 1685 Guillaume-Charles-François-Louis of Bourgogne, died 1707: Count of Wacken.
        5. Maria Theresia de Bette: marr. in 1700 François-Claude Coloma, 2nd Count of Bornhem.
      2. François de Bette.
      3. Ignace I de Bette.
      4. Eugene Ernest de Bette: Cisterciensan Abbot of Notre-Dame de Rosières, Beçanson.
      5. Maria Honorine de Bette:
  2. Adrian Bette, Lord of Fontaines:
    Married to Agnes de Merode.
    1. Elisabeth Bette, marr. Ernest of Aerschot
    2. Françoise de Bette, (1593–1666): 26th abbess of Forest Abbey
