= Klusener =

Klusener is a surname. Notable people with the surname include:

- Gonzalo Klusener (born 1983), Argentine footballer
- Lance Klusener (born 1971), South African cricket coach and former cricketer

== See also ==
- Kläsener
- Cluysenaar
