= Mesen Castle =

Noble residence in Lede, Belgium

Coordinates: 50.9674°N 3.9856°E

- Belgium
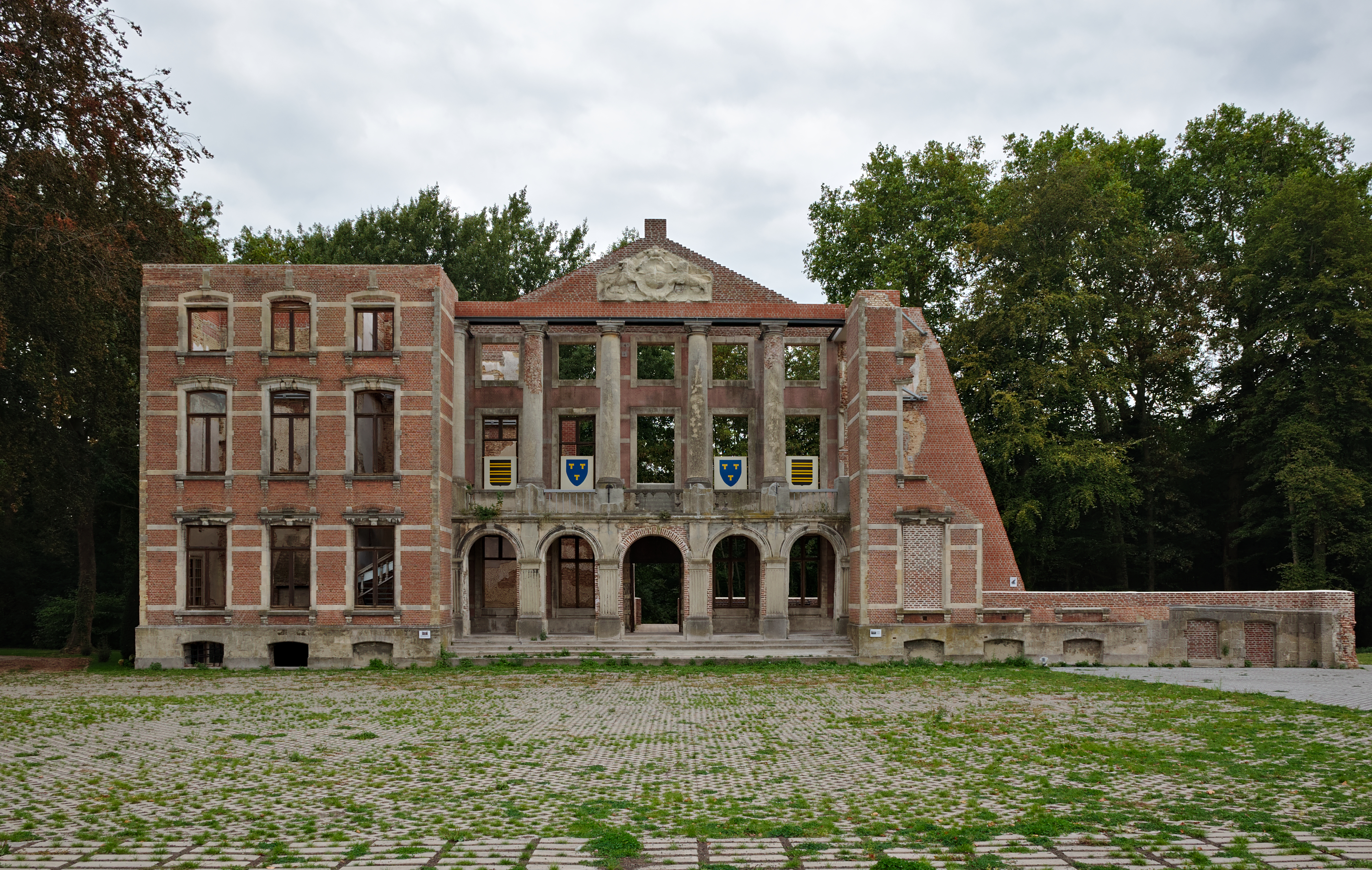
- Preserved remains (2018).

Site information
- Type: Castle
- Open to the public: no
- Condition: Demolished

Site history
- Built: 1749
- Built by: Giovanni Niccolò Servandoni for the Marquess of Lede

Mesen Castle was an important noble residence in Lede, Belgium, today partly ruined and completely abandoned. The castle is considered to have been one of the most important aristocratic estates of the 18th century.

== History ==
Originally the vast estate and castle were private owned by the Marquess of Lede. Among the castle's residents were Françoise de Bette and Jean François de Bette, 3rd Marquess of Lede. The 18th-century facade was designed by the Italian architect Giovanni Niccolò Servandoni for the 4th Marquess, Emmanuel de Bette. It is considered one of this architect's major works. The main facade has a dorian colonnade with balustrade and large pediment, with heraldic crest of the house of Bette, holding lions.

After the noble house became extinct, the property was bought in 1897 by a Catholic institution and had an important social function. New buildings were added in Neogothic style.

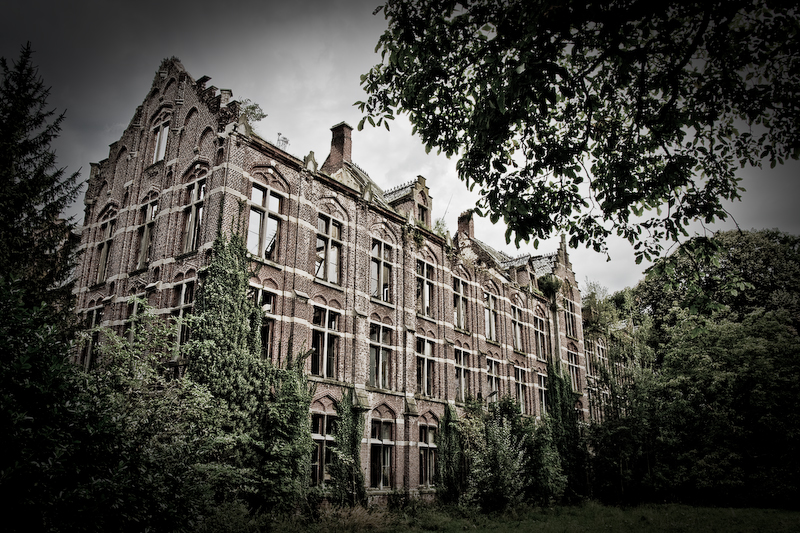
The ruins of Mesen Castle

From 1914 to 1970, the castle became a boarding school for girls. Institution Royale de Messines moved to the Mesen Castle after the First World War. There were approximately 150 girls from 5 years old to 18 years old that studied in French at the "Pensionnat de Lede" from 1914 to 1970. The school was for daughters of men in the military after the First World War. It was a very good school managed by very strict laic ladies where girls learned French, Flemish Dutch, arithmetic, gymnastics, theatre, cooking, good manners, painting, and sewing. The girls and ladies lived together in a very close community, leaving only for Christmas, Easter and summer vacations, and having visitors once a month.

Before the final demolition in 2011, the ruins were popular for urban exploration.

== Status ==
The local authorities refused to protect the castle or to classify it as a monument and let it fall into complete ruin. By 2015 the town council of Lede, Belgium, decided to demolish the remaining buildings after prior partial demolition to make place for a new sanatorium in 2010. All remaining ruins were demolished shortly after this decision. A small part of the main facade was cleaned, stabilized and displayed in the park along with the foundations of another wing.
