= Hieronymus van Orley =

Hieronymus van Orley O.F.M.
- Born: 1590; Brussels, Duchy of Brabant, Spanish Netherlands
- Died: Unknown
- Education: apprenticed to Antonie Drua
- Style: Baroque
- Movement: Catholic Reformation
- Patron(s): Maria de Taye
- Website: rkd.nl/explore/artists/60938

Hieronymus van Orley (active c. 1612) was a Franciscan painter in the Spanish Netherlands.

Van Orley was born in Brussels in 1590 and learnt the art of painting from Antonie Drua in Mechelen around 1612. Maria de Taye, abbess of Forest Abbey outside Brussels, commissioned paintings from him for the abbey church. A number of his portraits were engraved by Richard Collin and were reproduced in Jean François Foppens, Bibliotheca belgica (2 vols., Brussels, 1739).
