= Adrienne du Petit-Cambrai =

Lady Adrienne du Petit-Cambrai O.S.B.
- Abbess of Forest Abbey
- In office: 1587–1608
- Predecessor: Françoise de la Douve
- Successor: Maria de Taye

Personal details
- Died: 6 November 1608
- Buried: Forest Abbey

Adrienne du Petit-Cambrai (died 1608) was the 24th abbess of Forest Abbey.

== Life ==
The daughter of Françoise de Gavre of Liedekerke and of Antoine du Petit-Cambrai, lord of Huval, Adrienne du Petit-Cambrai was appointed abbess of Forest Abbey by royal letters patent, and was installed 27 September 1587. The monastery had been devastated during the early decades of the Dutch Revolt, and was rebuilt under her leadership.

Both the Abbey of Forest and the parish church of Dilbeek claimed to possess the remains of Saint Alena, a situation which Mathias Hovius, Archbishop of Mechelen, regarded as problematic. On 25 September 1600 the reliquary of St Alena was opened and the contents inspected by Pierre Vinck, dean of Brussels. The abbess took the opportunity to remove four small bones from the spine and present them to the countesses of Berlaymont and Arenberg. On 14 February 1601, the archbishop issued letters patent authenticating the relics of St Alena in Forest, and ordering that henceforth nothing resembling human remains was to be carried in the procession of St Alena in Dilbeek, but instead a statue of the saint be used. On 24 June 1601 Abbess Adrienne had the relics in Forest carried in solemn procession.
