= Kläsener =

Kläsener is a German surname. Notable people with the surname include:

- Thomas Kläsener (born 1976), German footballer
- Wolfgang Kläsener (born 1962), German church musician, choral conductor, and academic lecturer

== See also ==
- Klusener
- Cluysenaar
