= Guillaume de Bette, 1st Marquess of Lede =

Spanish Netherlands military commander (1600–1658)

Coat of Arms of de Bette

Guillaume de Bette, 1st Marquess of Lede (c. 1600– 23 June 1658), Baron of Péronne, Lord of Impe, Knight of Santiago, was a military commander and diplomat from the Spanish Netherlands.

== Life ==
Bette was born at Lede around the beginning of the 17th century, the son of John de Bette, Lord of Lede and Joanna, lady of Bergen. He married Anna Marie de Hornes-Bassignies, daughter of Gerald de Hornes, 1st Count of Bassignies (1560-1612), Royal Chamberlain and Governor of Mechelen. They had five children, and he was succeeded as Marquess of Lede by Ambrosius his eldest son. His cousin, Françoise de Bette, was the 26th abbess of Forest Abbey.

Entering upon a military career, he became colonel of an infantry regiment in the Army of Flanders, and acted as military governor of Maastricht during the 1632 siege. On 3 August 1633, his barony, Lede, was raised to a marquisate in recognition of his service to the Spanish Monarchy. Between 1635 and 1640, he was governor of the Duchy of Limburg and the Overmaas. In 1636, he conquered the County of Valkenburg. From 1640 until 1646, he was Stadtholder of Upper Guelders.

In 1655, he travelled to the Commonwealth of England on behalf of Philip IV of Spain in a vain attempt to head off Oliver Cromwell's Anglo-Spanish War. He died on 23 June 1658 as a result of wounds received during the Siege of Dunkirk.

== Commemoration ==
In Lede, he gifted the main altar in the parish church, which still stands. The Marquess is also remembered in the village by a pair of 4-meter tall processional giants, Markies de Bette and Markiezin Anne-Marie de Hornes, created in honour of Bette and his wife in 1950. In 1952, there was a wedding ceremony for the giants. In 2013, Lede named a street "Willem de Bettelaan" in his honour.

== Descendants ==
Guillaume de Bette was the grandfather of Jean François de Bette, 3rd Marquess of Lede and Felipe-Emmanuel de Bette.
