= Capture of Maastricht =

1632 siege by the Dutch Republic

Siege of Maastricht
- Part of the Eighty Years' War
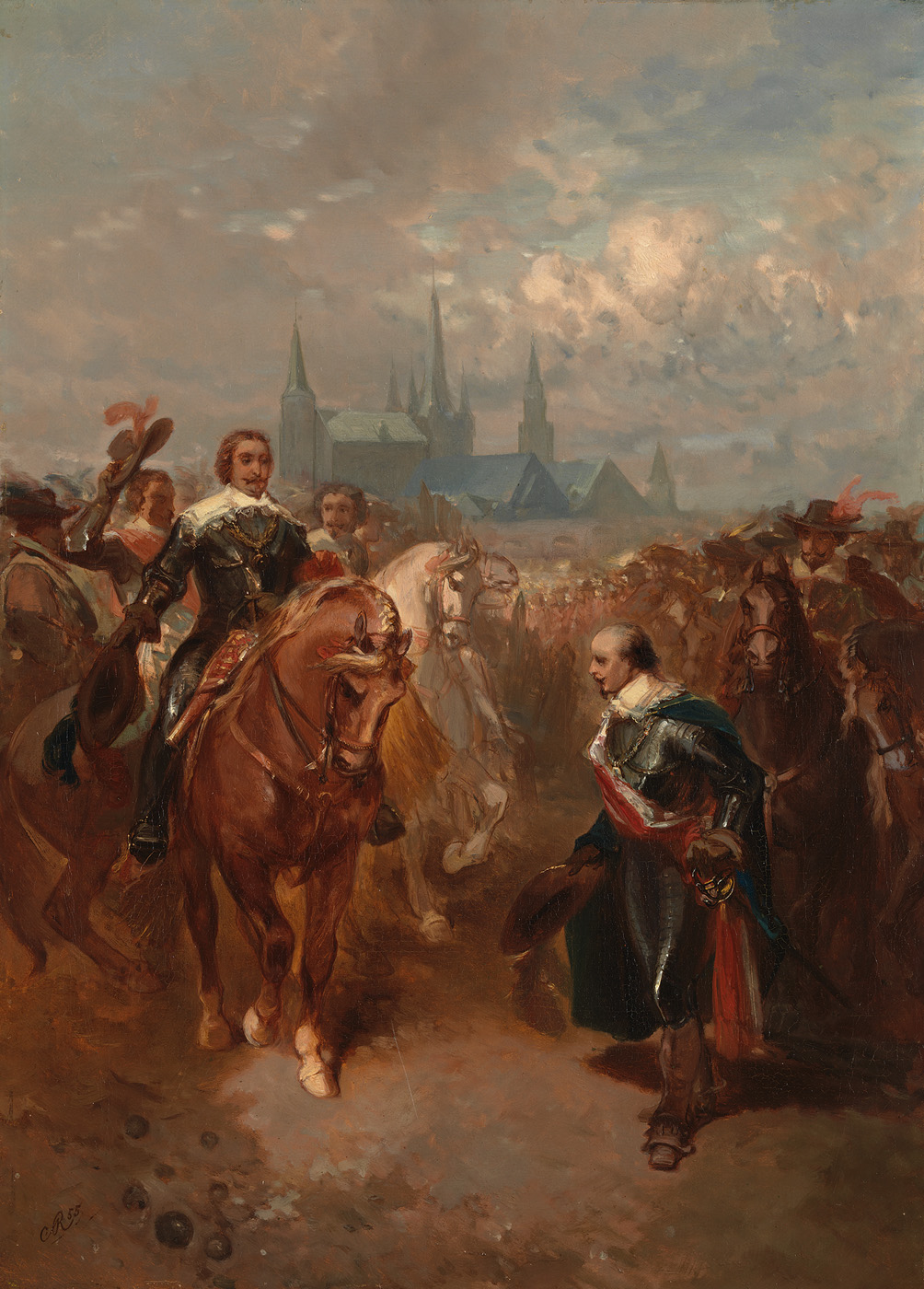
- Frederick Henry enters Maastricht
Date	9 June to 22 August 1632
Location	Near Maastricht (present-day the Netherlands) 50°52′00″N 5°41′00″E
Result	Dutch victory

Belligerents
Spain; Holy Roman Empire	Dutch Republic

Commanders and leaders
(Spain) Guillaume de Bette (Spain) Lelio Brancaccio (Spain) Gonzalo de Córdoba (Holy Roman Empire) Graf zu Pappenheim	(Dutch Republic) Frederick Henry (Dutch Republic) Horace Vere

Strength
2,000 infantry 3,000 armed citizens Relief forces 18,000 infantry 6,000 cavalry	17,000 infantry 4,000 cavalry
- Location within Netherlands Capture of Maastricht (Europe)

The Siege of Maastricht in 1632 was a military operation carried out by the Dutch Republic against the Spanish-held city of Maastricht during the Eighty Years’ War. Led by Frederick Henry, Prince of Orange, the Dutch forces sought to capture the strategically located city to gain control over an important crossing of the Meuse River and to weaken Spanish influence in the southern Netherlands.

== Background ==
After the failed invasion of Flanders in 1631 Frederick Henry had realised to overcome the stalemate The Hague needed the help of the South Netherland people. In May 1632 the president of the Council of Finances in Brussels, the Count of Warfusée, along with the Count of van den Bergh initiated covert discussions with the States General in The Hague, seeking assistance should a widespread rebellion break out in the southern Netherlands. The States General responded by issuing a proclamation to the southern provinces, urging them "to liberate themselves from the heavy and intolerable yoke of the Spaniards . . . and to join themselves unto these United Provinces", and assuring that their privileges and the public practice of Roman Catholicism would be upheld. Following the defeat at Breitenfeld Tilly had removed the greater part of the Spanish army from the Netherlands to defend the upper Palatinate.

== Prelude ==
By late May an army of 17,000 infantrymen and 4,000 cavalrymen had assembled on the Mookerheide. The principal commanders under Frederick Henry were: the Frisian stadtholder Ernst Gasimir of Nassau-Dietzwith his son Henry Casimir I John Maurice of Nassau-Siegen and Johann Wolfart van Brederode. The army had 83 pieces of artillery (Note: However, these were not only whole and demi-cannon and 12-pounders; the total also included six and three pound field guns, as well as chamber pieces, i.e. breech-loaders that weighed less than muzzleloading cannon but were less robust.) including 12 to 18 heavy guns.

In 1632 Maastricht was ringed by tall medieval walls with a large number of towers. A few earthen bastions and demi-lunes had been constructed to strengthen the defences against artillery. A flooded ditch fed by water from the river protected the low-lying parts of the defences. The town lies on both sides of the river Maas, which is particularly wide at Maastricht, so any attacker would have his forces split into two by the river. The garrison, commanded by Guillaume de Bette, baron of Lede, was strong, loyal to Spain and determined to resist the Dutch army. In addition to all this, there was a strong chance of a relief army being sent to Maastricht to raise the siege.

== Siege ==
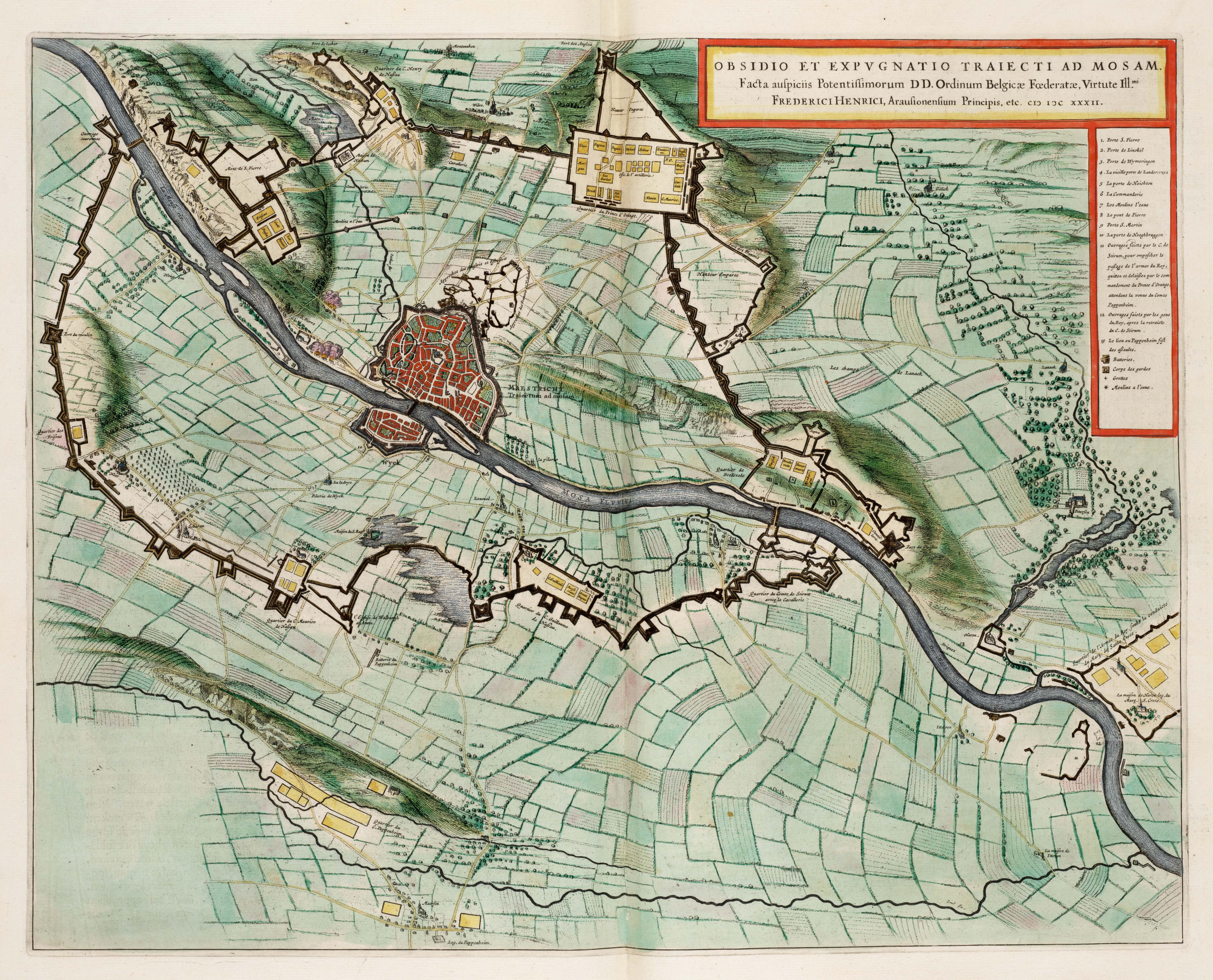
A map of the Siege of Maastricht

Frederick Henry arrived before Maastricht on 10 June with 17,000 infantry and 4,000 cavalry. This included some veteran English and French troops, who were to play a significant role in the siege. He at once began to dig lines of circumvallation and contravallation. These were earthwork fortifications that ran all the way round the town and were built to protect the besiegers' camps against sorties made by the garrison or attacks from a force outside the town. There were various forts and redoubts along these lines protecting the high ground or vulnerable sections. Where the lines met the river above and below the town pontoon bridges were constructed, allowing the besiegers to transfer troops and material from one side of the river to the other. The strength of these lines was to prove critical to the outcome of the siege.

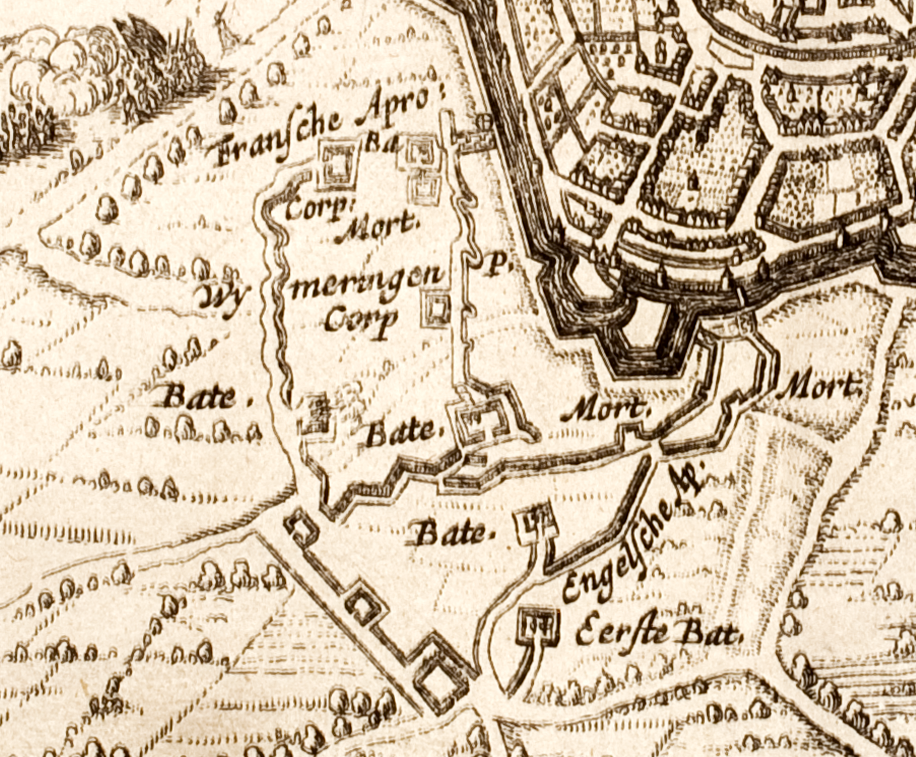
English and French approaches

Two approach trenches were made on the town, one by the English troops and the other by the French. The English and French approaches drove towards sections of the defences to the north and south respectively of the western corner of the town.

The French approach targeted a section of medieval walls near Brussels Gate that was inadequately flanked by the works either side of it and the English approach aimed just to the south of a demi-lune in front of the walls. This siege took place long before the days of parallel trenches, so the works consisted of eccentric zig-zag trenches and self-contained batteries that formed strong points.

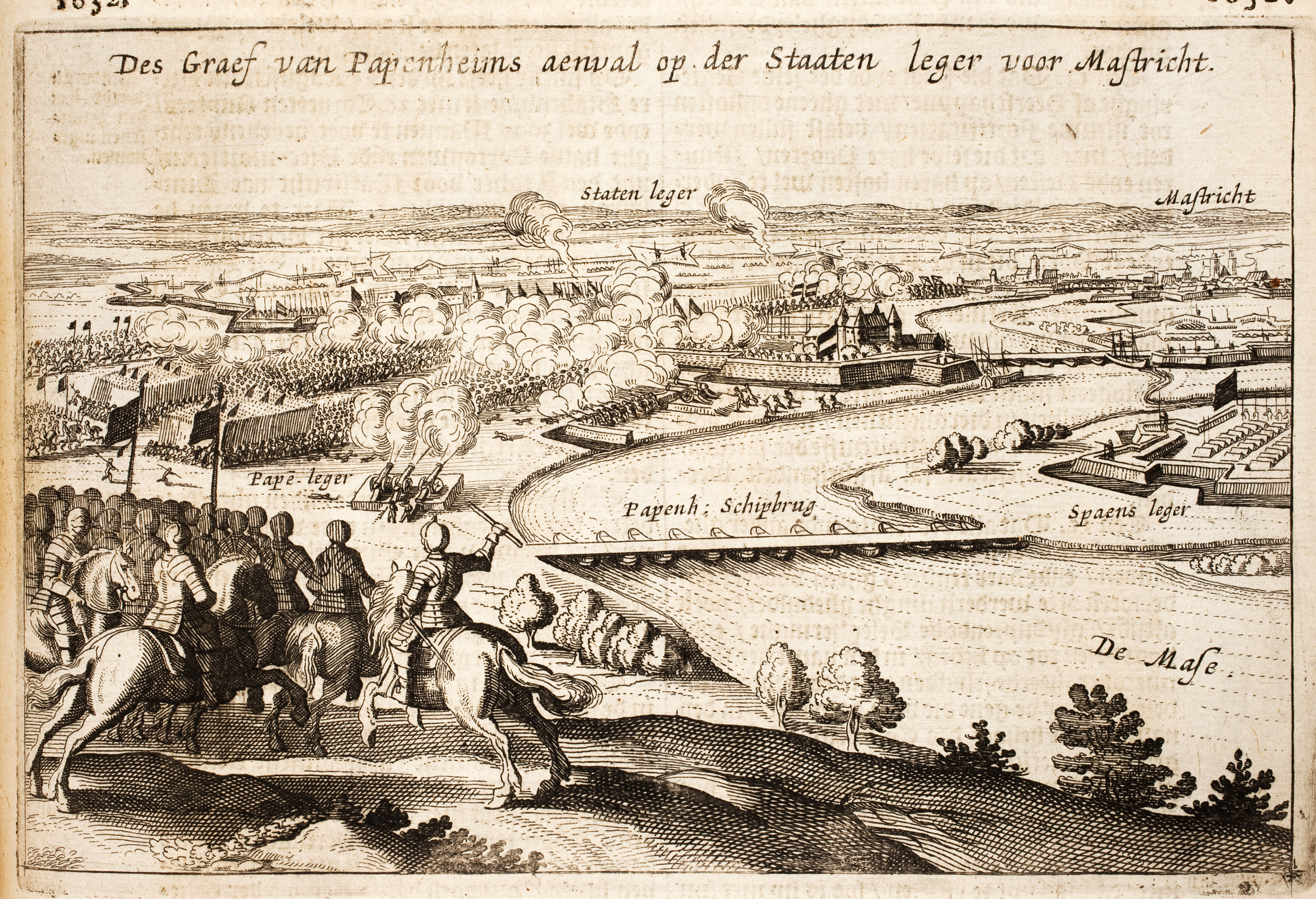
Pappenheim's counter-attack

In response to the investment of Maastricht, Isabella (the Governess of the Spanish Netherlands) recalled her troops from the Palatinate and sent Don Gonzalo Fernández and the Marquis of Santa Cruz to relieve the town. The Spanish arrived near Maastricht on 2 July with 18,000 infantry and 6,000 cavalry, but though they outnumbered Frederick Henry's army, they were unwilling to attack the Dutch lines on account of their strength.

By the beginning of August Don Gonzalo de Córdoba was reinforced by the Imperial commander Pappenheim, who brought 12,000 infantry and 4,000 cavalry. He resolved to attack the Dutch lines and force them to raise the siege. In a two-pronged attack, Don Gonzalo made a show of force on one side of the river and Pappenheim attacked the lines on the other side. This plan was well-conceived but in the end the strength of Frederick Henry's lines of contravallation and the superior morale of his troops (who were encouraged by his presence during the fighting) decided the day. Pappenheim was forced back with the loss of 1500 men. Among the casualties on the Dutch side were Robert de Vere, 19th Earl of Oxford and Sir Edward Harwood.

Having failed to raise the siege by force of arms, Don Gonzalez and Pappenheim decided to cut the Dutch supply lines and so starve them out of their strong position. However, the besiegers had sufficient supplies in their camps for another two months, so Frederick Henry simply ignored the relief forces' actions and pressed on with the siege.

The attackers were faced with a determined resistance from the garrison who made many sorties, particularly against the English approach, but in the end both the approaches reached the ditch. It was decided to mine the walls to form a breach and to this end two tunnels were dug beneath the ditch. A mine was detonated in one of them underneath the walls and a forlorn hope assaulted the breach on the night of 21 August. This assault succeeded in gaining a lodgement in the walls and the garrison capitulated the following morning, fearing that the town would be sacked if the attackers broke in.

== Aftermath ==
The garrison marched out with the honours of war on 23 August and Pappenheim and Don Gonzalo, who were still camped nearby but were running low on supplies, withdrew. Frederick Henry's feat in capturing Maastricht dismayed the Spanish, who made negotiations for peace, but their resolve was stiffened a few months later by the death of the Swedish Protestant hero Gustavus Adolphus at the Battle of Lützen on 16 November.

Nevertheless, the capture of Maastricht was an important victory for the Dutch Republic. While Venlo and Roermond were lost to the Spaniards in 1637, Maastricht remained in Dutch hands, even though sovereignty over the condominium was to be shared with the prince-bishops of Liège.

== Bibliography ==
- Parker, Geoffrey, The Dutch Revolt Penguin Books Ltd; 1990, ISBN 0-14-013712-2
- Kossmann, E.H.; et al. (The New Cambridge Modern History) (2008). "The Low Countries". In J. P. Cooper (ed.). The Decline of Spain and the Thirty Years War. Vol. IV. Cambridge: Cambridge University Press. ISBN 0-521-07618-8.
- Geyl, Pieter (1961). Part One 1609-1648. The Netherlands in the Seventeenth Century. New York: Barnes & Nobles.
- Knoop, Jan Willem (1862). Krijgs- en Geschiedkundige Geschriften Derde Deel. Schiedam: H. A. M. Roelants.
