= Maria de Taye =

Abbess

Lady Maria de Taye O.S.B.
- Abbess of Forest Abbey
- In office: 29 January 1609 – 28 July 1637
- Predecessor: Adrienne du Petit-Cambrai
- Successor: Françoise de Bette

Personal details
- Died: 28 July 1637

Maria de Taye (died 28 July 1637) was the 25th abbess of Forest Abbey at Vorst in the Duchy of Brabant (now in Belgium) from 29 January 1609 until her death.

She was originally from Gooik. During her time as abbess she overstretched the abbey's finances by purchasing a refugium in Brussels. She also commissioned paintings from Hieronymus van Orley to adorn the abbey church, and commissioned an atlas of the abbey's property from the surveyor Filips de Dijn.
