= De Viron Castle =

Castle in Dilbeek, Flemish Brabant, Belgium

- Kasteel de Viron (Dutch); Château de Viron (French)
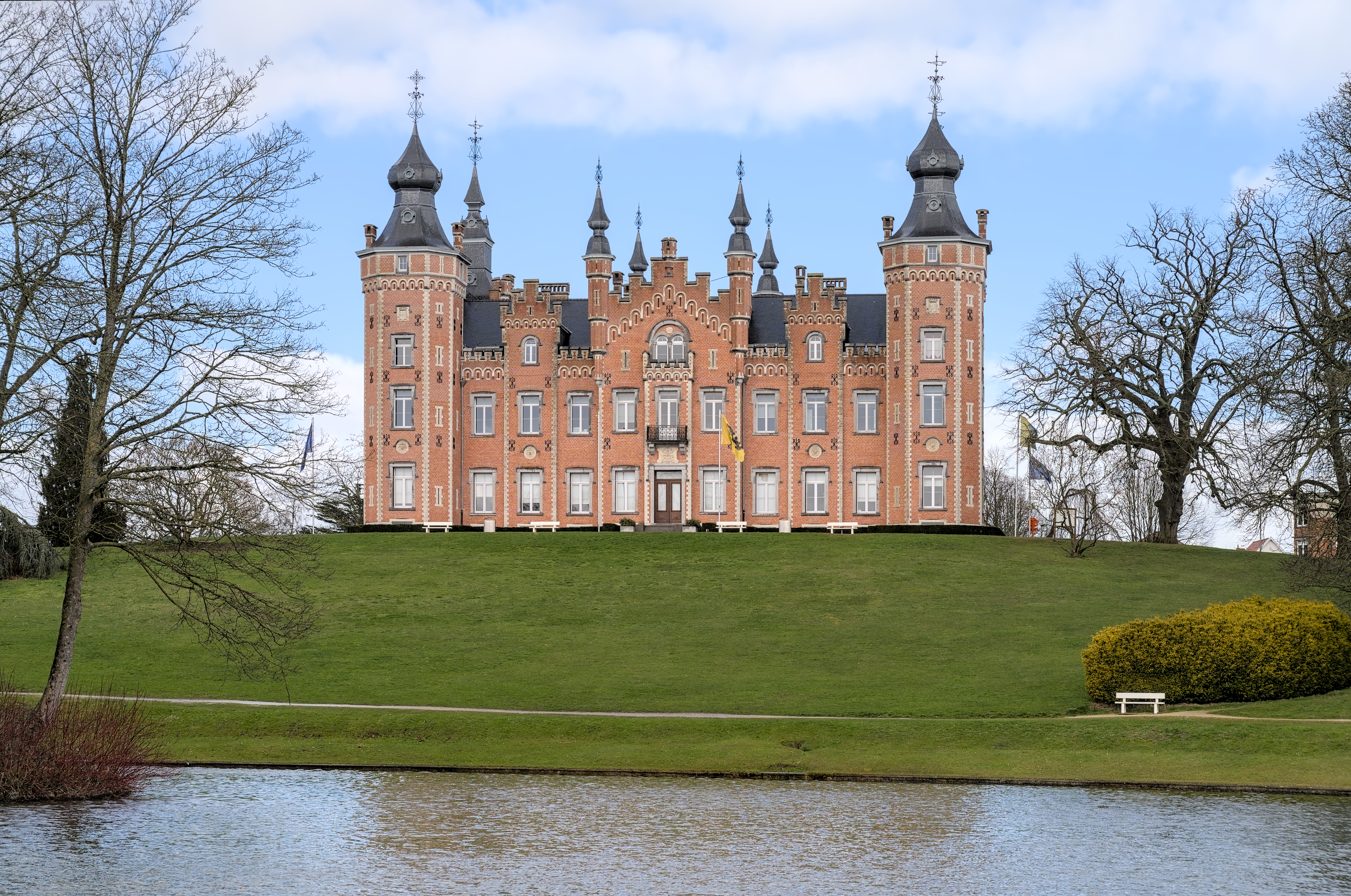
- Interactive map of the De Viron Castle area

General information
- Architectural style: Renaissance Revival
- Location: Dilbeek, Flemish Brabant, Belgium
- Coordinates: 50.8479°N 4.2636°E

Design and construction
- Architect: Jean-Pierre Cluysenaar

De Viron Castle (Dutch: Kasteel de Viron; French: Château de Viron) is a castle in Dilbeek, Flemish Brabant, Belgium. It has served as the town hall of Dilbeek and offices of the municipality since 1923 and was listed as a protected monument in 1990.

== History ==
The castle was built in 1863 by the Dutch architect Jean-Pierre Cluysenaar, and commissioned by the de Viron family, which had settled in Dilbeek in 1775. It was built in Renaissance Revival style on the ruins of a 14th-century fortification, which was destroyed in 1862. One of the medieval towers, the Sint-Alenatoren, can still be seen in the park surrounding the current building. It is named after Saint Alena, who lived in Dilbeek. It became the town hall of Dilbeek in 1923, and was protected as a monument in 1990.

== Architecture ==
The castle counts 12 towers, 52 rooms, 365 windows and 7 staircases. This refers to the Julian calendar, which has 12 months, 52 weeks, 365 days and 7 days in a week. The castle lies in a park, with several other buildings of interest: a farm, an ice cellar and a coach house.
