= Felipe-Emmanuel de Bette =

Felipe Bette y de Croy (French: Félipe-Emmanuel de Bette; 24 January 1677 – 4 January 1742), known as the Knight of Lede, was a soldier and noble from the Spanish Netherlands.

Felipe was born in Valenciennes (now in Nord, France). He was the son of Agustín Ambrosio de Bette y Hornes, 2nd Marquess of Lede and Dorothea of Croÿ (Dorotea Brígida de Croÿ-Solre). His grandfather, Guillaume de Bette, was made a marquess by King Felipe V. His older brother Juan Francisco de Bette y Croy became the 3rd Marquess of Lede after their father's death in 1679.

Felipe was a Lieutenant General in the Royal Army of King Felipe V, and fought in the Battle of Melazzo, in Sicily, where Spain defeated the Holy Roman Empire. He was knighted as a Commander of the Order of Santiago.

He retired at age 50 and lived for 15 more years before his death in Barcelona. It is unknown if he married.

His portrait, by an unknown painter, is kept in the Reial Acadèmia Catalana de Belles Arts de Sant Jordi in Barcelona.
