= Lede, Belgium =

Municipality in East Flanders, Belgium

Lede
- Municipality
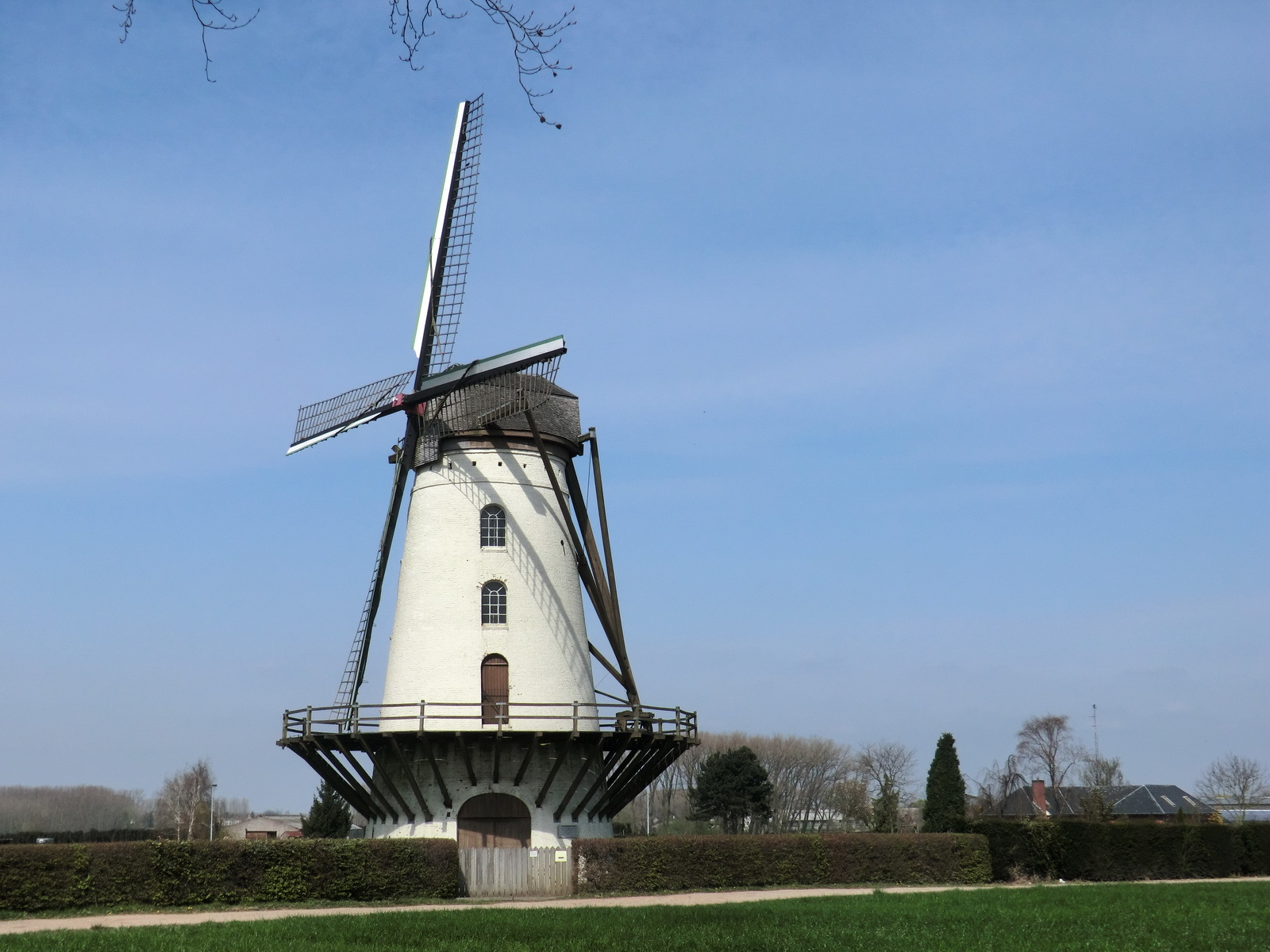

- Flag Coat of arms

- Location of Lede in East Flanders
- Interactive map of Lede
- Location in Belgium
- Coordinates: 50°58′N 03°59′E
- Country: Belgium
- Community: Flemish Community
- Region: Flemish Region
- Province: East Flanders
- Arrondissement: Aalst

Government
  - Mayor: Geertrui Van de Velde (CD&V)
  - Governing parties: CD&V, Groen, de coöperatie

Area
  - Total: 29.89 km^{2} (11.54 sq mi)

Population (2018-01-01)
  - Total: 18,628
  - Density: 623.2/km^{2} (1,614/sq mi)
- Postal codes: 9340
- NIS code: 41034
- Area codes: 053, 09
- Website: www.lede.be

Lede (Dutch pronunciation: [ˈleːdə]) is a municipality in the Belgian province of East Flanders, in the Denderstreek near the cities of Ghent, Aalst and Dendermonde.

In 2011, Lede had a population of 17,882 and area of 29.69 km^{2}, a population density of 575 inhabitants per km^{2}. The current mayor of Lede is Geertrui Van de Velde (CD&V).

== Name of town ==
The meaning of the name 'Lede' comes from the Dutch word 'Ledenaars' which means 'The Proud Farmers'

== Geography ==
The municipality comprises the sub-municipalities of Impe, Lede proper, Oordegem, Smetlede, Wanzele, and the hamlet of Papegem. All the sub-municipalities and also the hamlet are crossed by the Molenbeek.

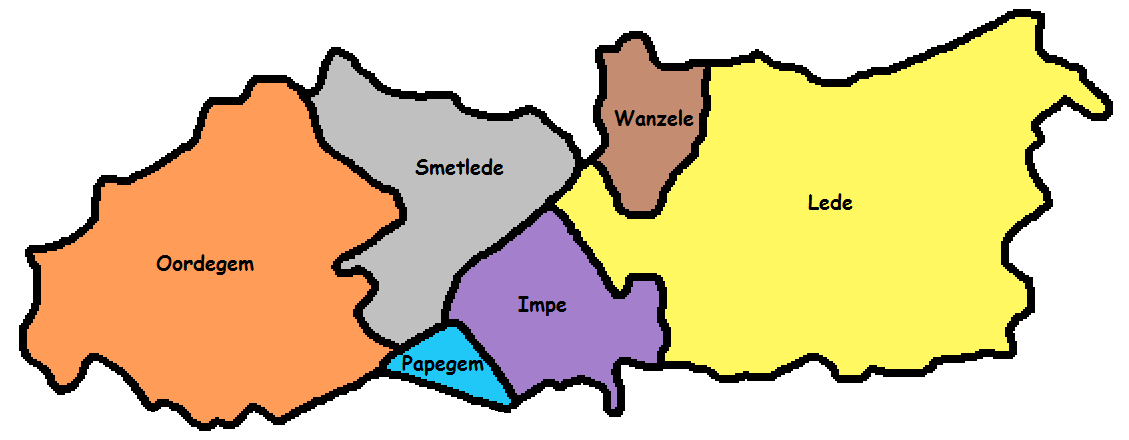
Map of Lede showing sub-municipalities

=== Sandstone ===
The Lede Formation (Dutch: Formatie van Lede; abbreviation: Ld) is a geologic formation in the subsurface of Belgium. The formation is named after Lede. It consists of shallow-marine limestone and sandstone, deposited in the former sea that covered Belgium during the Eocene. The bluestone (for roads) and in particular the yellow-brown calcareous sandstone extracted from quarries in Lede and neighbouring areas, were widely used during the 15th to 18th century as construction material for religious and civil buildings.

== History ==
Lede has its origins going back to the Middle Ages, controlled by various Lordships, especially the 'de Bette' family, (Marquess of Lede). The local church, 'Sint-Martinuskerk', was built in 14th Century. A Castle was built here in the mid-1700s.

The Brussels-Ghent railway line was constructed through Lede in 1856. But industrial development remained limited: a few rural breweries, weaving mills, clothing and shoe companies were founded by local families, but all disappeared by the late 20th Century.

== Sights ==
Lede is known for a statue of the Virgin Mary, inside the Martin's Church, called "Onze-Lieve-Vrouw-van-Zeven-Smarten" (Our Lady of the Seven Sorrows), to which a local legend attributes miraculous powers, such as healing of diseases. The statue attracts many pilgrims. The statue is taken around in a procession during a Sunday in June, after the biannual nine-day festival. The local church, built in 1496, houses the statue.

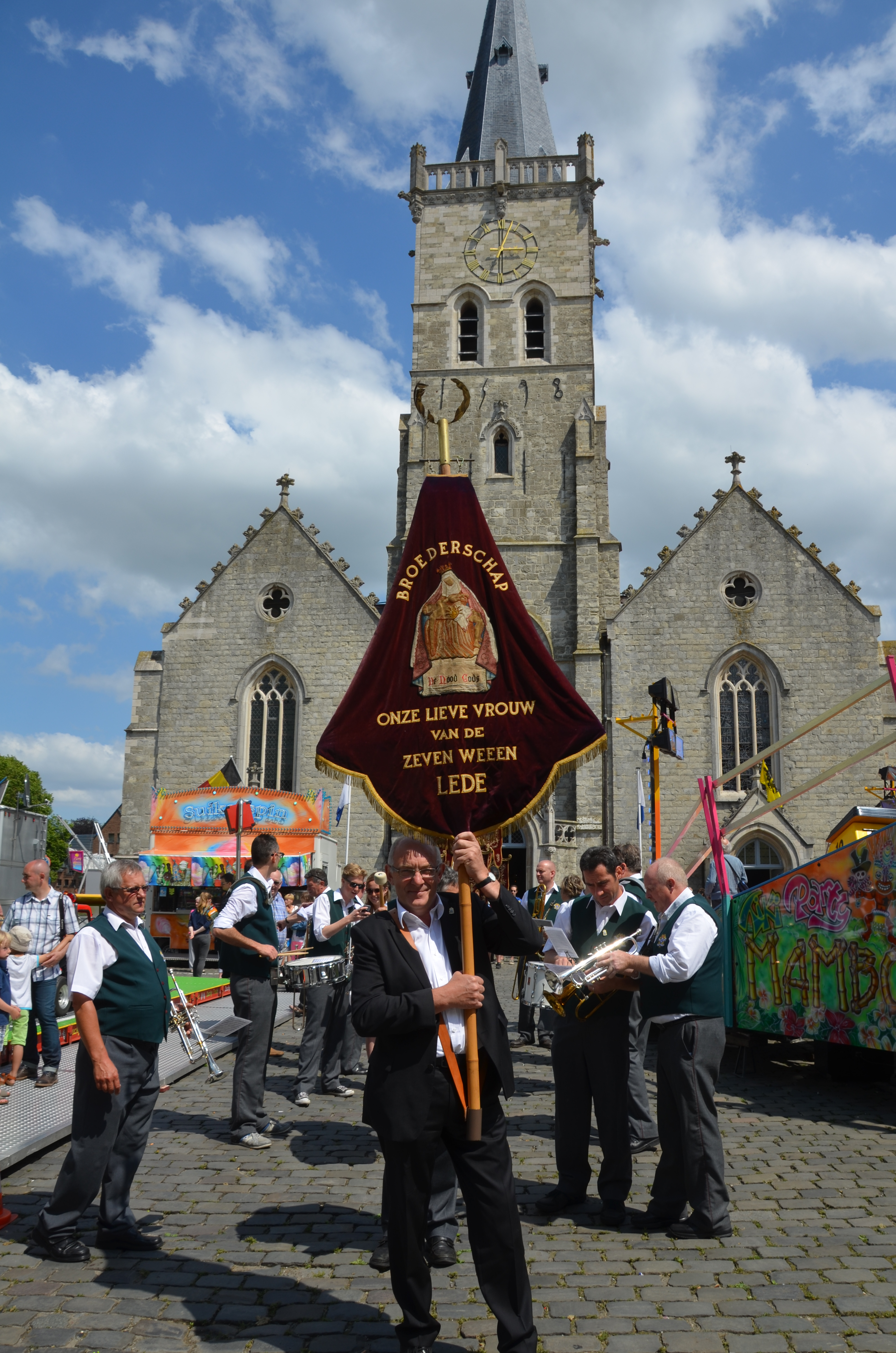
St. Martin's Church, Lede

The former Mesen Castle was situated in central Lede. It used to be the residence of the Marquess of Lede until its family line died out in the early 19th century. It was used as a private girls' school until it closed in the 1970s. It began to fall into ruins by the 1990s. The local authorities began to demolish parts of the castle in 2010, despite protests from the local population to preserve it. But most of the structure was completely torn down by 2015. The former castle gardens still exist as a park.

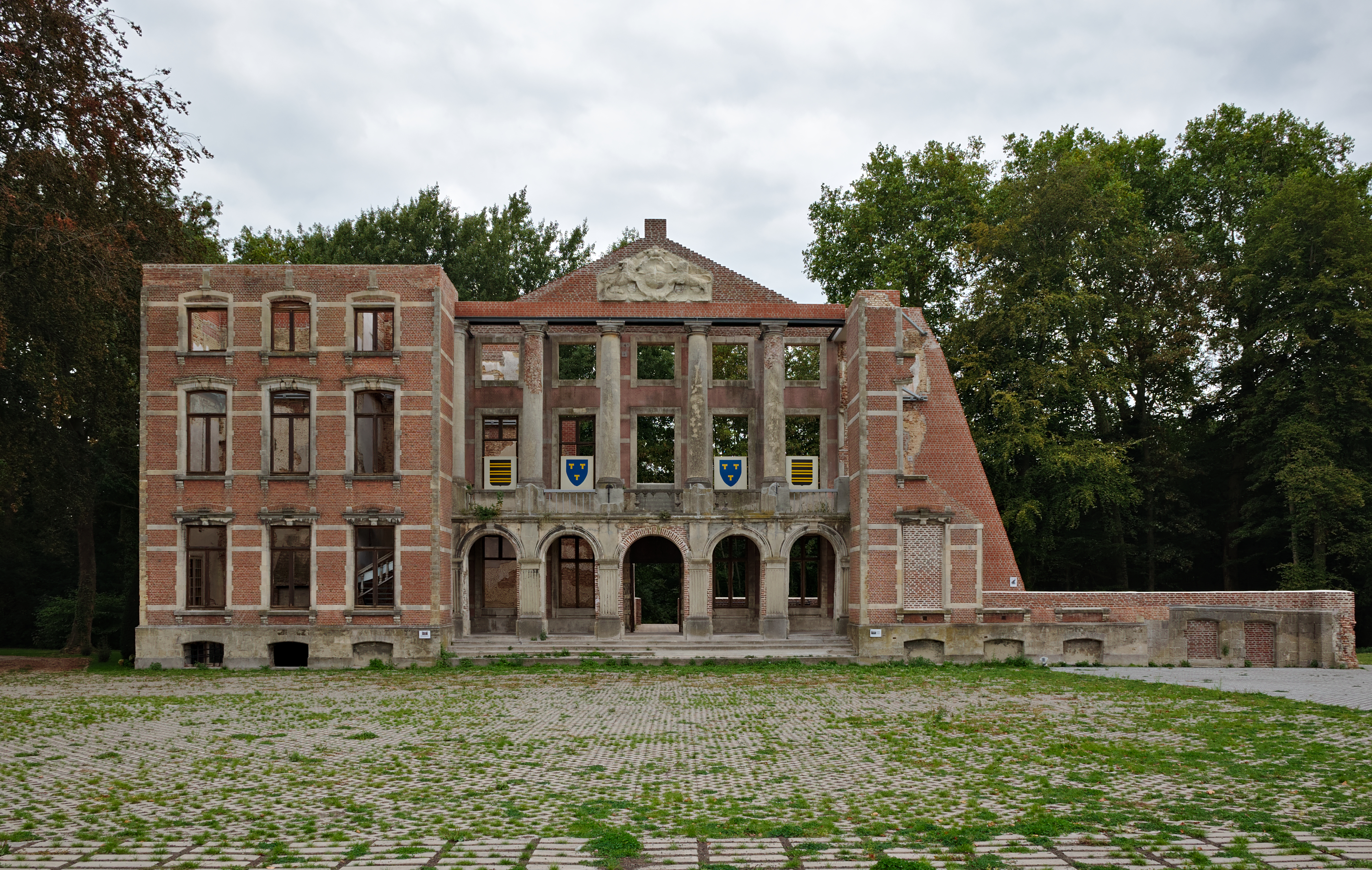
Castle of Mesen, Lede

== Economy ==
The economy of Lede consists of agriculture and small businesses, including tourism. A psychiatric clinic is also here. The community is known for its fields, woods, horses and hiking/jogging trails. One such nature area is the 'Vallei van de Serskampse Beek.'

== Notable people ==
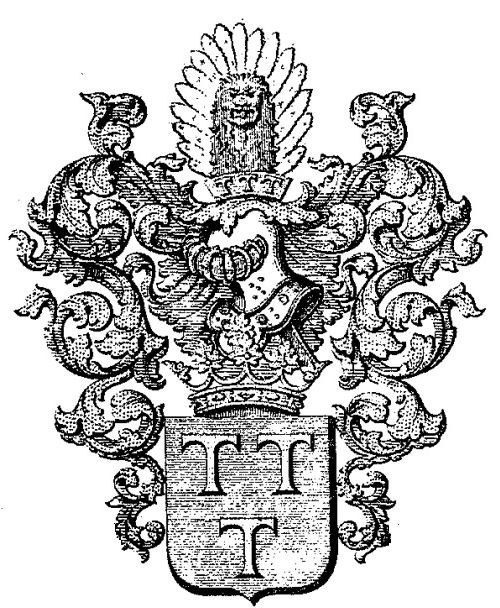
Coat of the House of de Bette

- House of Bette (Marquess of Lede)
  - Guillaum de Bette, 1st Marquess of Lede
  - Jean François de Bette, 3rd Marquess of Lede
  - Françoise de Bette
- Julius de Geyter
