= André Cluysenaar =

Belgian painter (1872–1939)

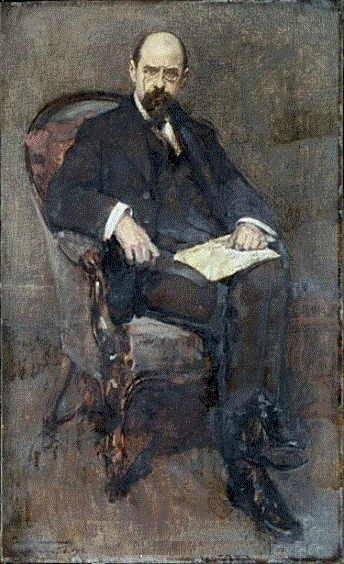
Self-portrait (c.1910)

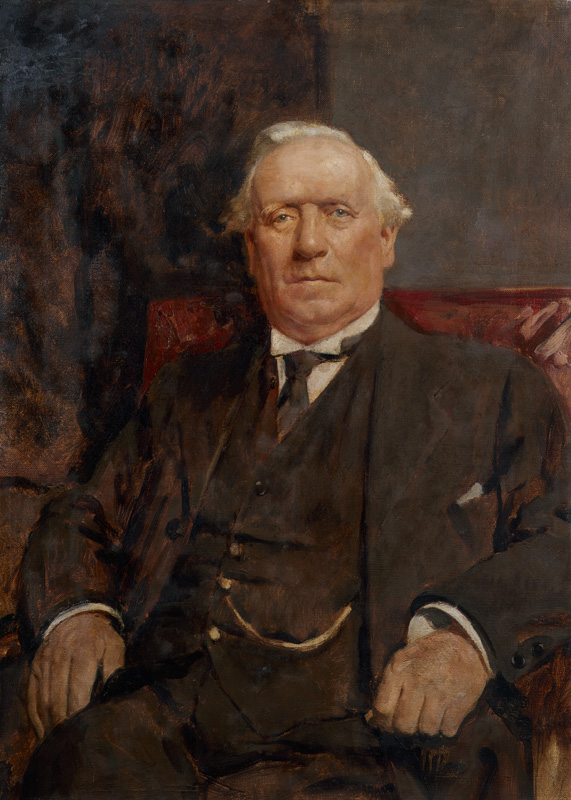
Herbert Henry Asquith (c.1919)

André Edmond Alfred Cluysenaar (31 May 1872, Saint-Gilles - 17 April 1939, Uccle) was a Belgian painter. He was especially known for portraits and female figures.

== Life and work ==
He was member of the Cluysenaar family, descendant from a long line of architects who originated in Aachen, where the family name was spelled "Klausener". Perhaps the best-known among these was his grandfather Jean-Pierre Cluysenaar. His wife, Alice Gordon, was related to Lord Byron.

He received his first art lessons from his father, then studied with François-Joseph Navez. Initially, he worked as a sculptor, but devoted himself entirely to painting after 1902. He was firmly grounded in the romantic style at first; producing still lifes and genre scenes, but later turned to impressionism and painted mostly female figures, often semi-nude. He also executed monumental ceiling paintings for the City Hall in Saint-Gilles.

During World War I, he lived in London where he established a reputation painting portraits of notable people, including the Royal Family, which were done in a more commercial style using Alfred Stevens as a model. Most of these portraits may be seen in the National Gallery.

== Honours ==
- 1919 : Knight of the Order of Leopold.
- 1934 : Officer in the Order of the Crown.
