= Françoise de Bette =

French abbess (1593–1666)

Lady Françoise Bette O.S.B.
- Abbess of Forest Abbey
- In office: 1637–1666
- Predecessor: Maria de Taye
- Successor: Catherine Quarré

Personal details
- Born: 1593 Lede, County of Flanders, Spanish Netherlands
- Died: 1666 (aged 72–73)

Françoise Bette (1593–1666) was, from 1637 to 1666, the 26th abbess of Forest Abbey.

She was born in Lede, in the county of Flanders, the daughter of Adrian Bette, knight, and Agnes de Merode de Rummen. Her cousin, Guillaume de Bette, 1st Marquess of Lede, was a knight of the Order of Santiago with links to the Habsburg court.

As abbess she faced financial strains, which she attempted to meet by selling off part of the abbey's land. She also attempted to reform the monastery, which had acquired a reputation for loose discipline. She was not notably successful in either effort.

In 1644 she commissioned a precious reliquary in Baroque style to house the relics of Saint Alena. This was probably paid for by her family. It is now in the parish church of Forest, Belgium.
