= Saint Alena =

Christian saint

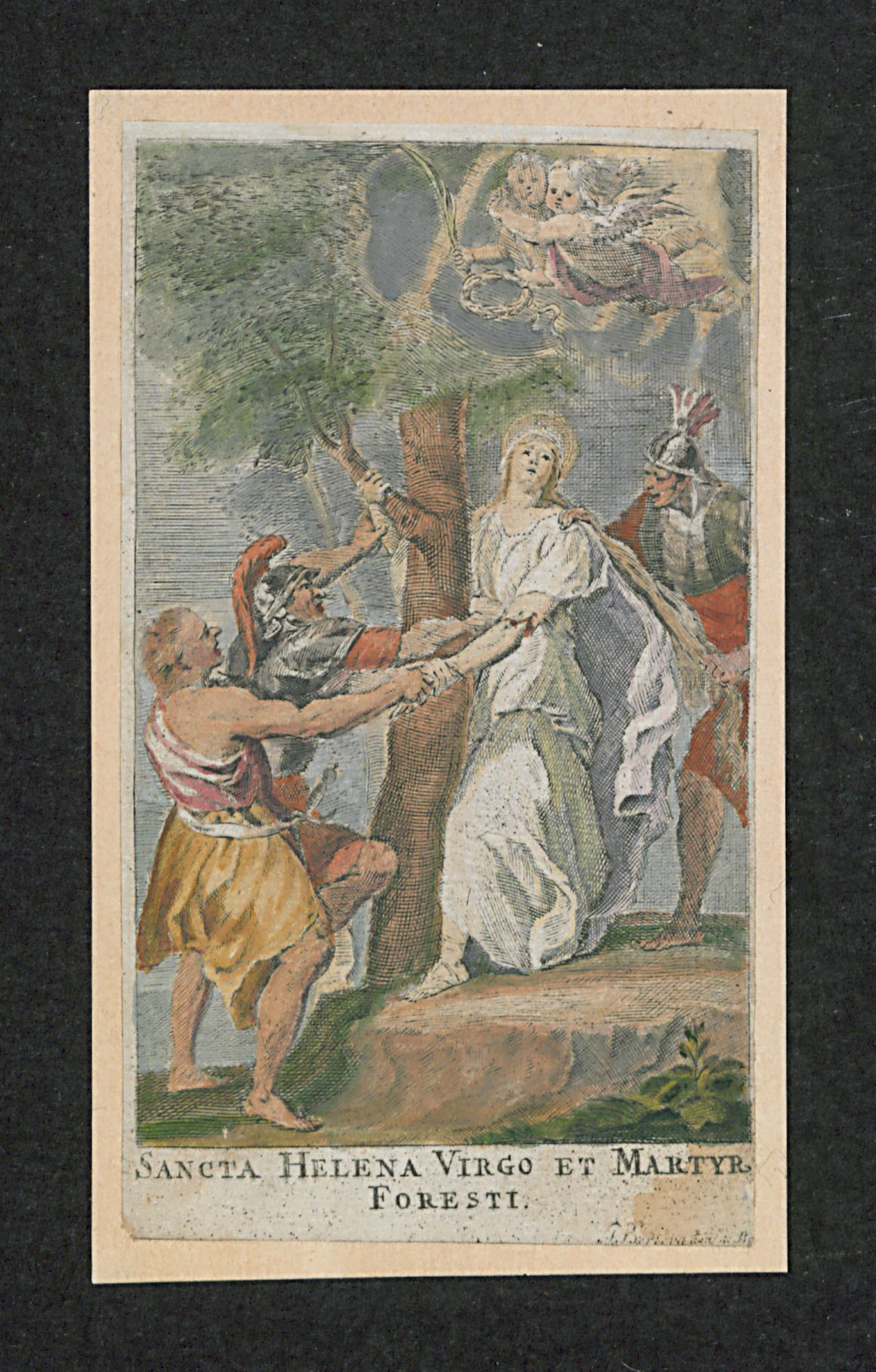

Virgin Martyr
- Born: Dilbeek, Belgium
- Died: c. 640; Forest, Belgium
- Venerated in: Roman Catholic Church; Eastern Orthodox Church
- Canonized: 1193
- Major shrine: Forest, Belgium
- Feast: 16 June (Brabant); 18 June (Eastern Orthodox); 19 June (Italy); 24 June (USA); 17 June, 28 July or 16 December (Poland)
- Patronage: Toothaches and eye trouble

Alena, also known as Alène or Alina, is a Christian saint who was martyred around the year 640. She is sometimes referred to as Alena of Forest, Alena of Brussels, or Alena of Belgium, having died in Forest, Belgium, which is now one of the nineteen municipalities of Brussels.

== Life ==
The traditional account of Alena's life, dating to the twelfth century, states that she was born in Dilbeek, just outside Brussels, Belgium, to noble pagan parents Levold and Hildegaart. Alena chose to be baptized without the knowledge of her parents. As a Christian, she had to attend Mass secretly.

When her father discovered that she was worshipping as a Christian, he came to the conclusion that Christians had bewitched her into conversion. He sent guards to bring her home; she resisted, and during the struggle she lost one arm. She subsequently died in prison due to her injuries.

Various (unspecified) miracles were claimed at the burial site of Alena's body, and one of Levold's subjects, Duke Omundus, had his sight restored by invoking Alena's prayers.

An angel appeared and took the severed arm to the chapel where she worshipped. Alena's parents were shocked, but the miracles, and the witness given by her determined faith, led them to examine Christianity, and they themselves were converted.

== Veneration ==
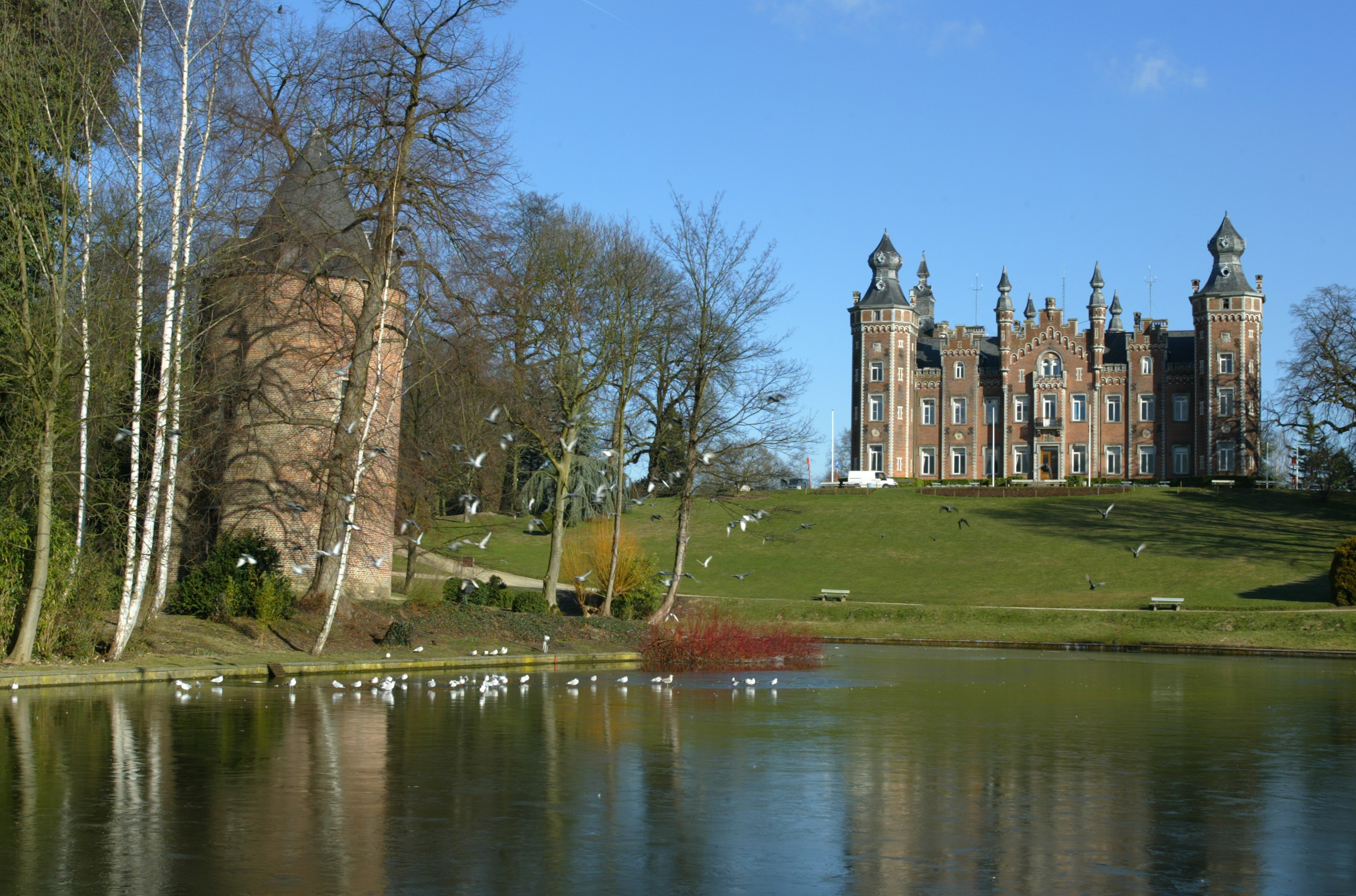
Sint-Alenatoren (left) with De Viron Castle on the background

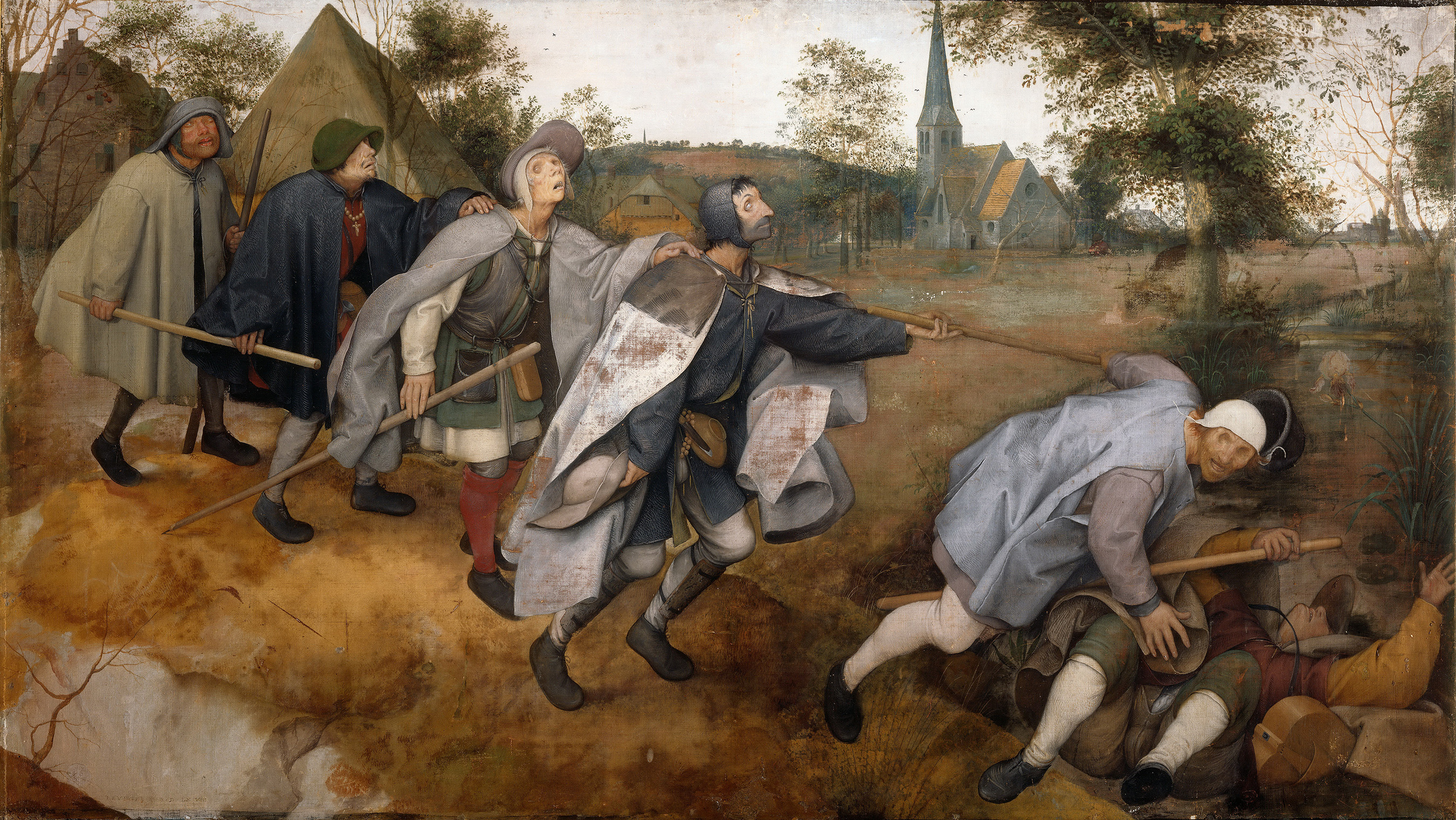
The Blind Leading the Blind by Pieter Breughel the Elder In the background is the church of Saint Alena of Dilbeek Belgium

The Bishop of Cambrai gave permission for Abbot Godeschalk of Affligem Abbey to enshrine Alena's remains in the Priory of Forest, then a dependency of Affligem, as the relics of a saint on Pentecost Sunday, 19 May 1193. This was effectively a canonisation.

The chapel with Alena's relics became a popular place of pilgrimage. Her shrine became incorporated into the parish church of Forest as a chapel which held her cenotaph and relics. By around 1600, her jawbone and upper arm were preserved in the parish church, each in its own jewel-studded reliquary dating from the 15th century. The rest of the bones, with the exception of the collarbones, were preserved in the abbey church in a Baroque reliquary (1644) commissioned by Françoise de Bette, abbess 1637–1666. When the abbey was suppressed in 1796 the last abbess, Juana Francisca de Rueda de Conteras (1785–1818), removed this reliquary to a monastery near Würzburg. It was returned to Forest only in 1812. The collarbones are still kept in a reliquary in the church of St Ambrosius in Dilbeek.

Recent analysis shows that the remains kept in Forest are unlikely in fact to be Alena's relics: carbon-14 dates are 9th-10th century and the size and shape of the bones strongly suggest a male rather than female body (conclusive DNA testing was not possible).

Alena is depicted in art as a princess clinging to a tree stump or with one arm torn off. She might also be portrayed healing a blind man, or with an angel helping her.

She is venerated in Brussels, and is invoked for eye troubles and toothache.

=== Feast Days ===
Her feast day is given as 17 June by the Polish Breviary but other Polish-language sources also recognise 16 June, 28 July and 16 December; with 16 June and 16 December often being kept as the name day in Poland. Her feast is cited as 19 June in Italy, and 24 June by English-language sources. It is kept locally on 16 June in the Brabant region of Belgium. The Antiochian Orthodox Diocese of North America commemorates her on 18 June. She does not appear in the index of the 2004 edition of the Roman Martyrology.
