= Forest Abbey =

Former abbey in Forest, Belgium

- Abbaye de Forest (French); Abdij van Vorst (Dutch)
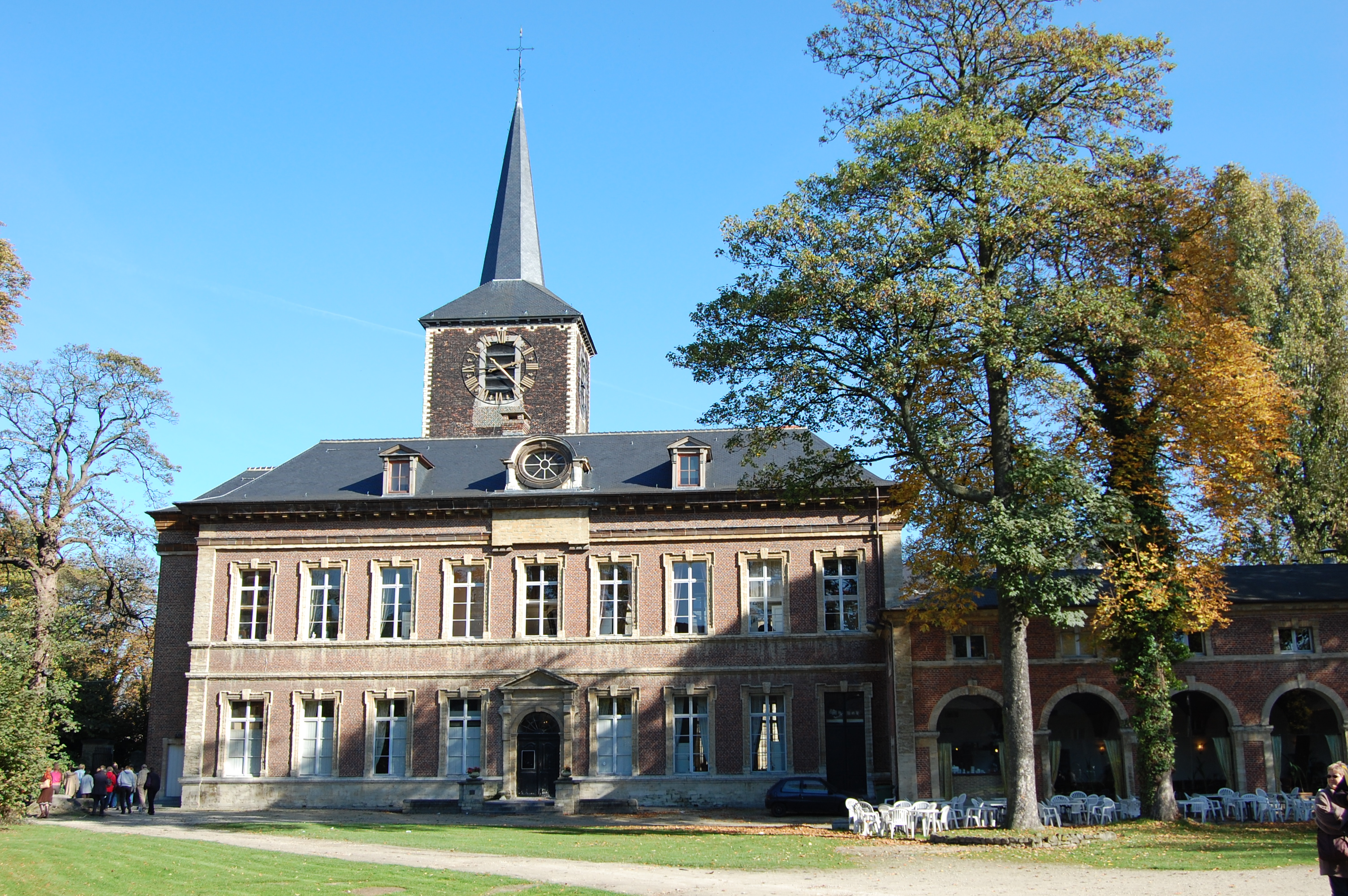
- View from the cour d'honneur (main courtyard)
- Interactive map of the Forest Abbey area

General information
- Type: Abbey
- Location: City of Brussels, Brussels-Capital Region, Belgium
- Coordinates: 50°48′38″N 4°19′00″E
- Closed: Deconsecrated in 1796

Forest Abbey (French: Abbaye de Forest) or Vorst Abbey (Dutch: Abdij van Vorst) is a former Benedictine abbey located in the Brussels municipality of Forest, Belgium. It was founded in 1105 and existed for nearly 700 years, until its partial destruction by fire in 1764. It was abolished in 1796. Only the abbey's 18th-century outbuildings have been preserved. They are now owned by the municipality and serve as a cultural centre.

== History ==
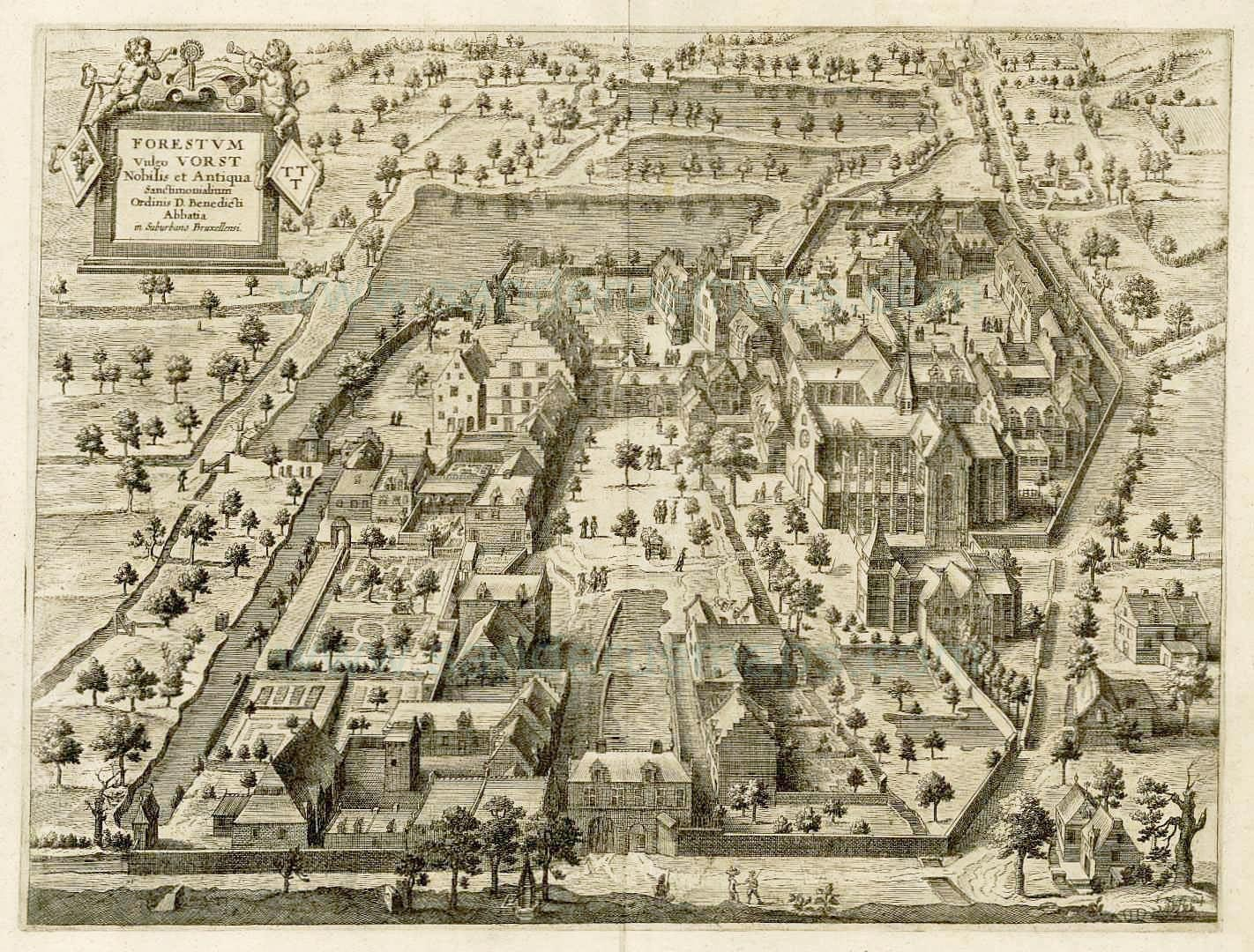
Forest Abbey, engraving by Lucas Vorsterman II, published in Sanderus, Chorographia Sacra Brabantiae (1659)

The abbots of Affligem Abbey, which had been the ecclesiastical owners of the parish since the Bishop of Cambrai ceded it to them in 1105, decided to build a priory for women in Forest, which would eventually become Forest Abbey. The first prioress was named in 1239. Also in the 13th century, the Romanesque Church of St. Denis was rebuilt in the newer Gothic style. The neighbouring abbey church was rebuilt in the 15th century.

Relics of Saint Alena, whose cult was popular in the region, were formerly kept both in the parish church and in the abbey church, but since 1796 only in the parish church.

Much of the abbey was destroyed by fire on 26 March 1764. The abbey was suppressed on 8 October 1796 and sold the following year.

The abbey and the site were classified as a historic monument on 8 September 1994. The buildings that survived the dismantling are now owned by the municipality of Forest, and are used as a cultural centre for seminars, banquets and exhibitions.

== Abbesses ==
- Petronella, daughter of Zeger, castellan of Ghent, installed 9 May 1239
- Heylwide de Bouterstin, abbess 1260–1294
- Marie de Clebben
- Machtild van Asse
- Aleydis van Pollar
- Clarisse van Cattendyck
- Catherine de Beaufort
- Catherine van Keisterbeke
- Marguerite van Bouynes
- Yolenta van Ysche, died 2 February 1341
- Jeanne van Huesdem, elected 14 March 1341
- Isabelle de Massemyn, died 6 December 1384
- Aleyde de Goer, elected 6 December 1385, died 29 December 1385
- Marie de Trazegnies, elected 27 November 1386, died 14 October 1388
- Marie Sconinckx, elected 14 October 1388, died 6 September 1418
- Catherine van Magdeghem, elected 7 September 1418, died 10 September 1430
- Elizabeth Sconinckx, elected 19 February 1430, died 19 August 1457
- Marguerite van Schoers, elected 20 July 1458, died 1489
- Catherine van Bouchout, died at Utrecht on 6 October 1498
- Barbe van Leaucourt, resigned, died at Anderlecht in 1516
- Margareta van Liedekerke, transferred from the Abbey of Ghislenghien to reform Forest Abbey; arrived 24 July 1500; re-established discipline and good order, died 25 September 1541
- Marguerite van Liedekerke, niece of previous, died 19 May 1560
- Françoise de la Douve, died 3 April 1583, during disruptions of the Dutch Revolt: community lived as refugees in Dendermonde and Brussels from 1578; abbey burnt down by rebels in 1582
- Adrienne du Petit-Cambrai, appointed by royal letters patent, installed 27 September 1587, rebuilt the monastery, died 6 November 1608
- Maria de Taye, 25th abbess, installed 29 January 1609; died 29 July 1637
- Françoise de Bette, 26th abbess, installed 25 July 1638; died 29 August 1666
- Catherine Quarré, installed 12 September 1667; died 1 September 1668
- Dorothée Christine d'Yves, installed 12 January 1670, died 15 October 1692
- Agnes Scholastica de Riviere d'Arschot, great niece of Françoise de Bette, elected 18 January 1693; died 19 February 1712
- During a five-year vacancy the abbey was governed by the prioress, Florence van Eyck
- Marie-Josephe d'Espinosa, installed 22 December 1716; died 8 January 1743
- Jeanne-Thérèse de Roissin, consecrated 9 June 1743; died 27 December 1756
- Françoise de Landas, installed 26 April 1757, died 27 July 1760
- Marie-Josephe de Bouzies, 33rd abbess, installed 19 October 1760
- Juana Francisca de Rueda de Conteras, last abbess 1785–1796

== See also ==
- Roman Catholicism in Belgium
- Neoclassical architecture in Belgium
- History of Brussels
- Culture of Belgium
- Belgium in the long nineteenth century
