= Cluysenaar family =

Belgian family

The Cluysenaar is a Belgian family notably of architects and artists.

== History ==
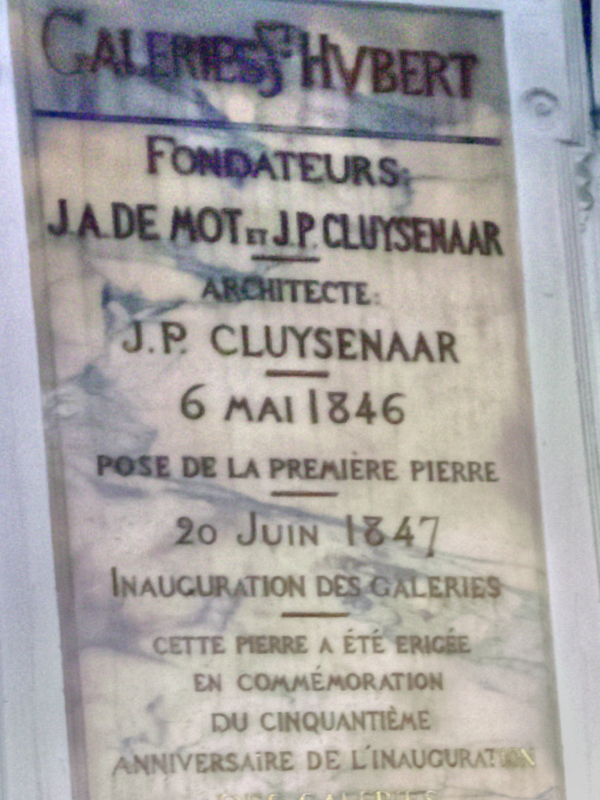
Signature of Jean-Pierre on the Galeries Royales, Brussels

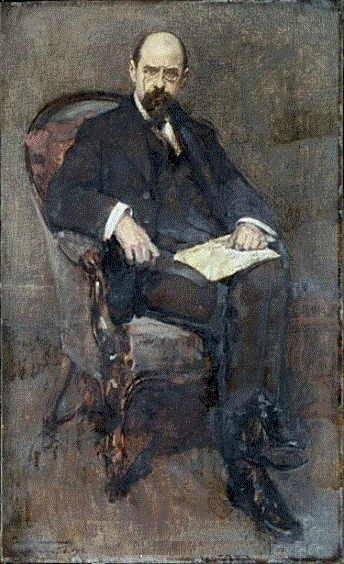
Selfportrait of Andre Edmond Alfred Cluysenaar, c. 1910

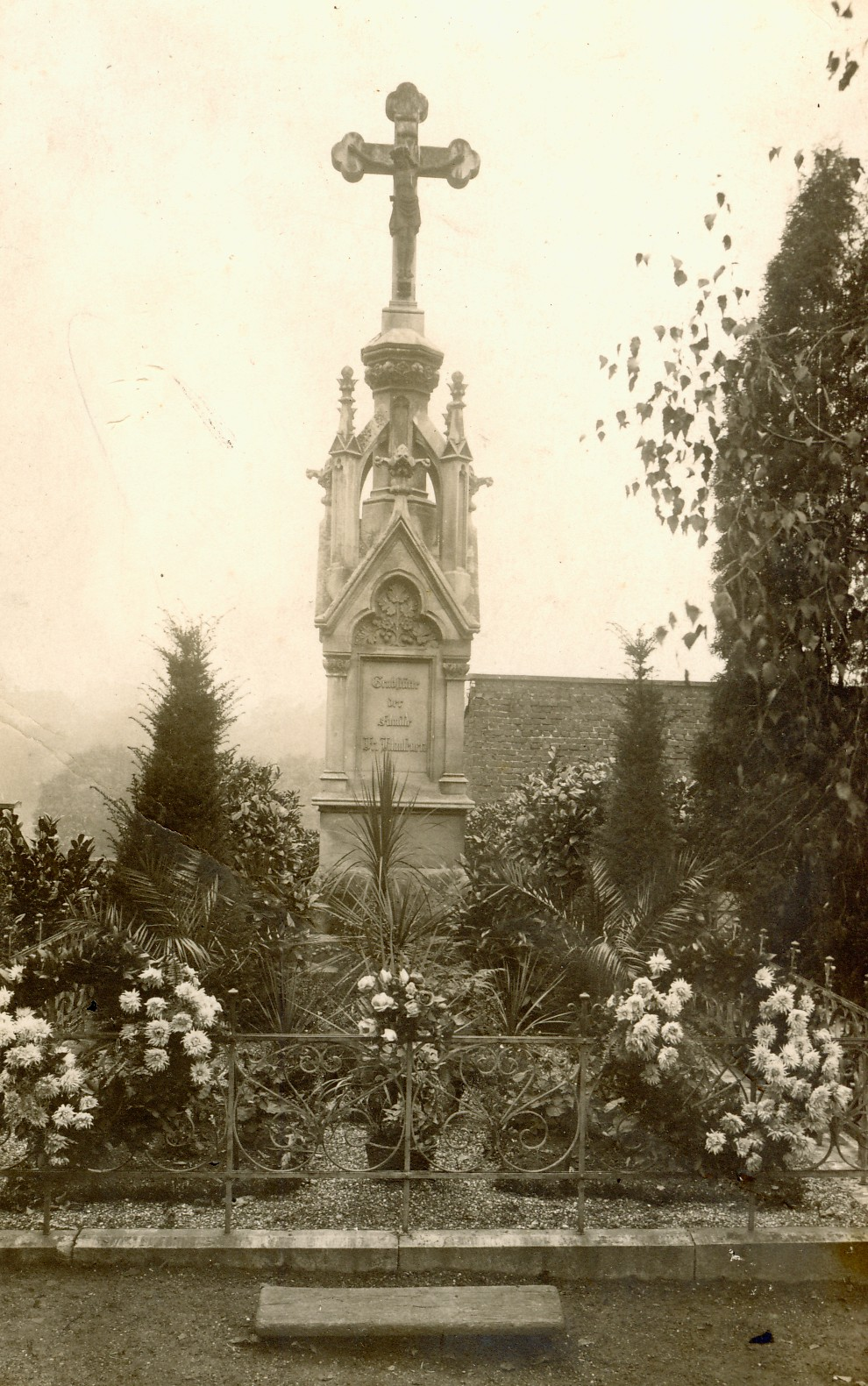
Klausener grave, Heißbergfriedhof Burtscheid

The roots of this Catholic family are in Flirsch in Tyrol, Austria. Some famous people descend from the original branch, among them Erich Klausener who was killed in the Night of the Long Knives.

The Belgian branch of the family descends from Paulus Klausener, whose son Johannes-Petrus was an architect.

Joannes, an engineer in the Netherlands, was married to Gerinda Geritsen. They are the parents of Jean-Pierre.

- Jean-Pierre Cluysenaar, he was married first in 1830 to Elisabeth Puttaert and second to Adelaide Puttaert.
  - Gustave
  - Adèle Clotilde Cluysenaar: married to Gustave Jean-Jacques Saintenoy, royal architect of the Count of Flanders.
    - Paul Pierre Jean Saintenoy, architect married to Louise Ponselet, she was the daughter of Victor Nicolas Auguste Ponselet (brewer in Anderlues) and Aurore Pourbaix. ( her aunt Stephanie Pourbaix was married to Jan Verhas, founder of the School of Dendermonde )
      - Jacques Saintenoy, architect married to Simone van den Perre.
      - Jacqueline Saintenoy (1900–1978), married to the executed Pierre Pucheu, former French Minister of the Interior.
  - Jean André Alfred Cluysenaar (1837–1902) married to Marie-Thérèse Cornélis.
    - André Edmond Alfred Cluysenaar (1872–1939) married to Alice Frances Gordon, born 1869 descendant of George Gordon Byron, 6th Baron Byron.
      - Jean Edmond Cluysenaar (1899–1986) married first to Sybil Fitzgerald Hewat, painter, second to Jacqueline Emilie Collier.
        - Anne Alice Andrée Cluysenaar married to Walt Jackson. She was murdered by her stepson Timothy Jackson.

== Family tree ==
Paulus Klausener
Gerinda Geritsen	Johannes Kluysenaar (1796–1834)
Jean-Pierre Cluysenaar (1811–1880)
Gustave	Adèle-Clothilde (1843–1901)	Gustave Jean-Jacques Saintenoy (1832–1892)	Jean André Alfred Cluysenaar (1837–1902)	Marie-Thérèse Cornélis
Louise Ponselet	Paul Pierre Jean Saintenoy (1862–1952)	Alice Gordon	André Edmond Alfred Cluysenaar (1872–1939)
Jacques Saintenoy (1895–1947)	Jean Edmond Cluysenaar (1899–1986)	Sybil Fitzgerald Hewat
Walt Jackson	Anne Alice Andrée Cluysenaar (1936–2014)
