= Jean-Pierre Cluysenaar =

Belgian architect

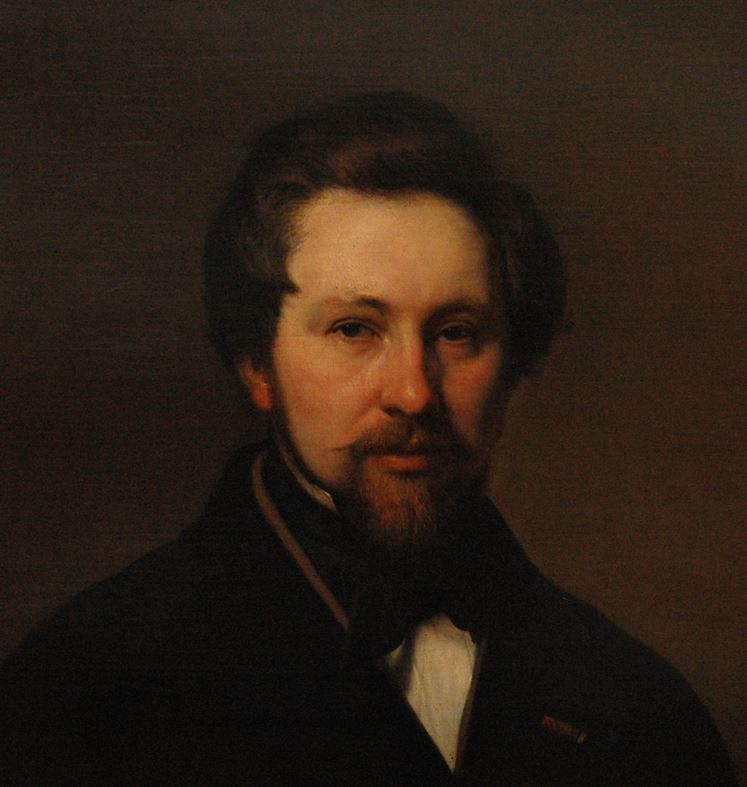
- Born: 28 March 1811; Kampen, Bouches-de-l'Yssel, French Empire
- Died: 16 February 1880 (aged 68); Brussels, Belgium
- Occupation: Architect
- Buildings: Galeries Royales Saint-Hubert

Jean-Pierre Cluysenaar (1811–1880) was a Dutch-born architect and the founder of the Belgian Cluysenaar family of artists and architects.

== Family ==
Cluysenaar was born in Kampen in the Netherlands as a son of Joannes Kluysenaar and Garidenia Kluysenaar, a Dutch family of architects and engineers. Jean-Pierre Cluysenaar was the father of the Cluysenaar family. His descendants became famous Belgian painters, sculptors and architects. During the United Kingdom of the Netherlands his family settled in the southern Belgian provinces.

== Career ==
Cluysenaar studied architecture at the Royal Academy of Fine Arts in Brussels under Tilman-François Suys. His teacher influenced him in his preference for the architecture of the Italian Renaissance.

Cluysenaar had a talent for business. He took the initiative for some very profitable real estate projects—such as the Royal Saint-Hubert Galleries in Brussels—in which he played the double role of architect and co-financier. He also had a good reputation amongst the Belgian nobility and high bourgeoisie. He received many commissions for designing large town houses (so called "hôtels"), mansions and châteaux. Cluysenaar was always prepared to adapt his designs to the desires and taste of his elite patrons. The many private mansions he built greatly differ in style. He designed elegant Palladian villas, as well as more sturdy neo-Gothic castles.

His stylistic versatility is also apparent in the many public buildings he designed, such as the neo-Renaissance Royal Conservatory in Brussels and the "Tudor style" railway station in Aalst.

== List of works ==
A brief selection of the more than 200 projects in which Cluysenaar was involved:

=== Châteaux and other private residences ===
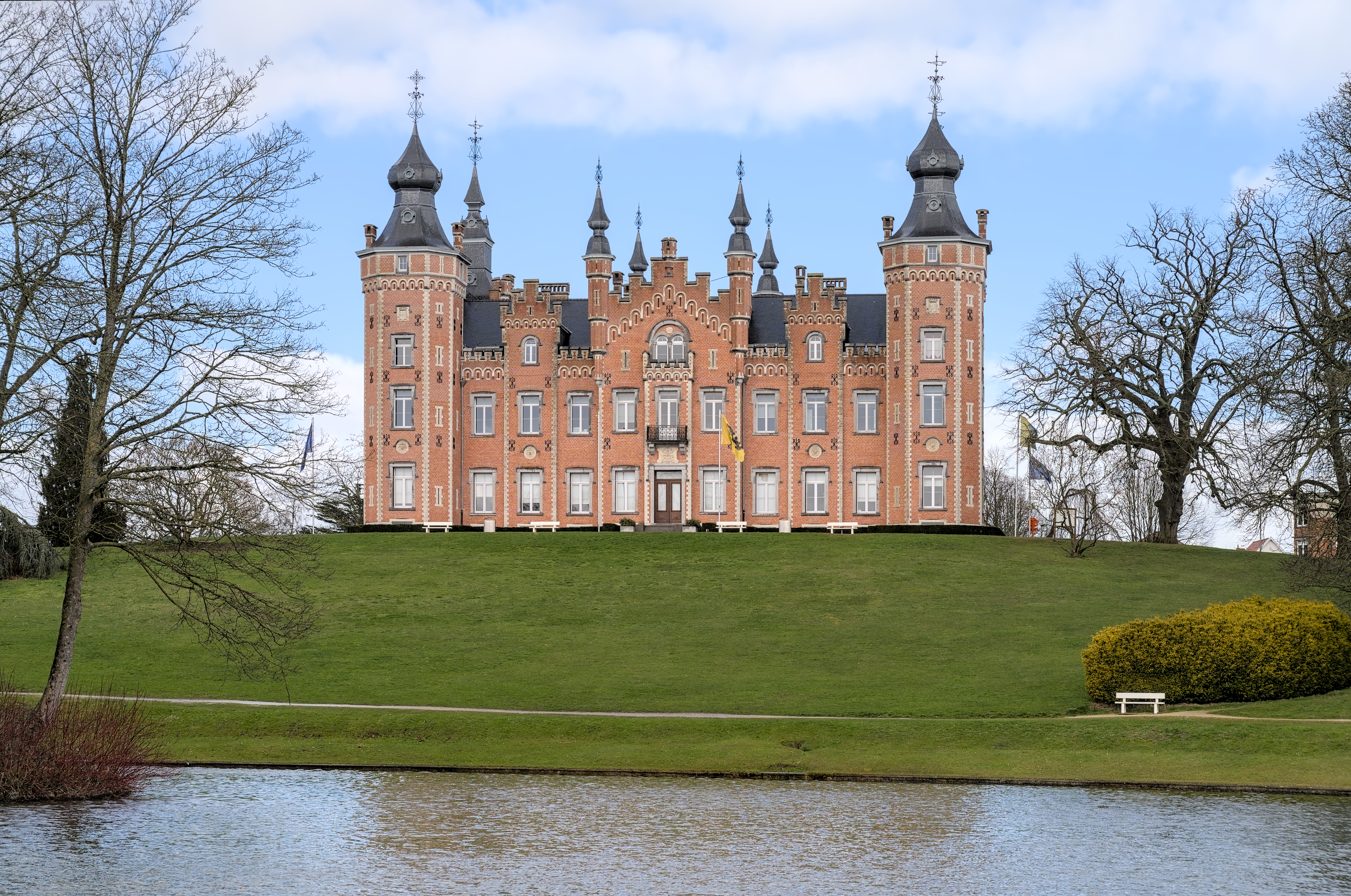
De Viron Castle, Dilbeek (1862)

- 1844: Hôtel of baron Brugmann, Rue d'Arenberg/Arenbergstraat, in Brussels
- 1846: Hôtel Nagelmackers, in Liège
- 1851: Château de Bavay, in Forest
- 1852–1853: Château Rey, today Town Hall of Drogenbos
- 1856–1858: Château of count Ferdinand de Meeûs in Argenteuil near Waterloo
- 1859: Mansion of the violoncellist Adrien-François Servais in Halle
- 1861: Hôtels de Meeûs, Square Frère-Orban/Frère-Orbansquare in Brussels
- 1862: De Viron Castle, currently Town Hall of Dilbeek
- 1864: Château of Vieux-Sart, in Corroy-le-Grand

=== Public buildings ===
- 1840: Bandstand in Brussels Park
- 1845–1847: Royal Saint-Hubert Galleries shopping arcade, in Brussels
- 1846: Concert Hall in Aachen, Germany
- 1847: Panorama de la rue Royale stairs and terraces surrounding the Congress Column, in Brussels (demolished)
- 1847: Magdalena Market (Marché de la Madeleine/Magdalenamarkt) covered market, in Brussels (partly demolished)
- 1848: Bortier Gallery shopping arcade, in Brussels
- 1851, 1862–1866: Theatre and "Kurhaus" in Bad Homburg, Germany
- Railway stations for the Société Dendre et Waes in Ternat (1856), Aalst (1856) and Zandbergen (1860)
- 1852: Hôpital des Aveugles (home for blind people), near the Halle Gate, in Brussels
- 1855–1862: Iron church (Église de fer) in Argenteuil (Waterloo)
- 1872–1876: Royal Conservatory, Rue de la Régence/Regentschapsstraat, in Brussels
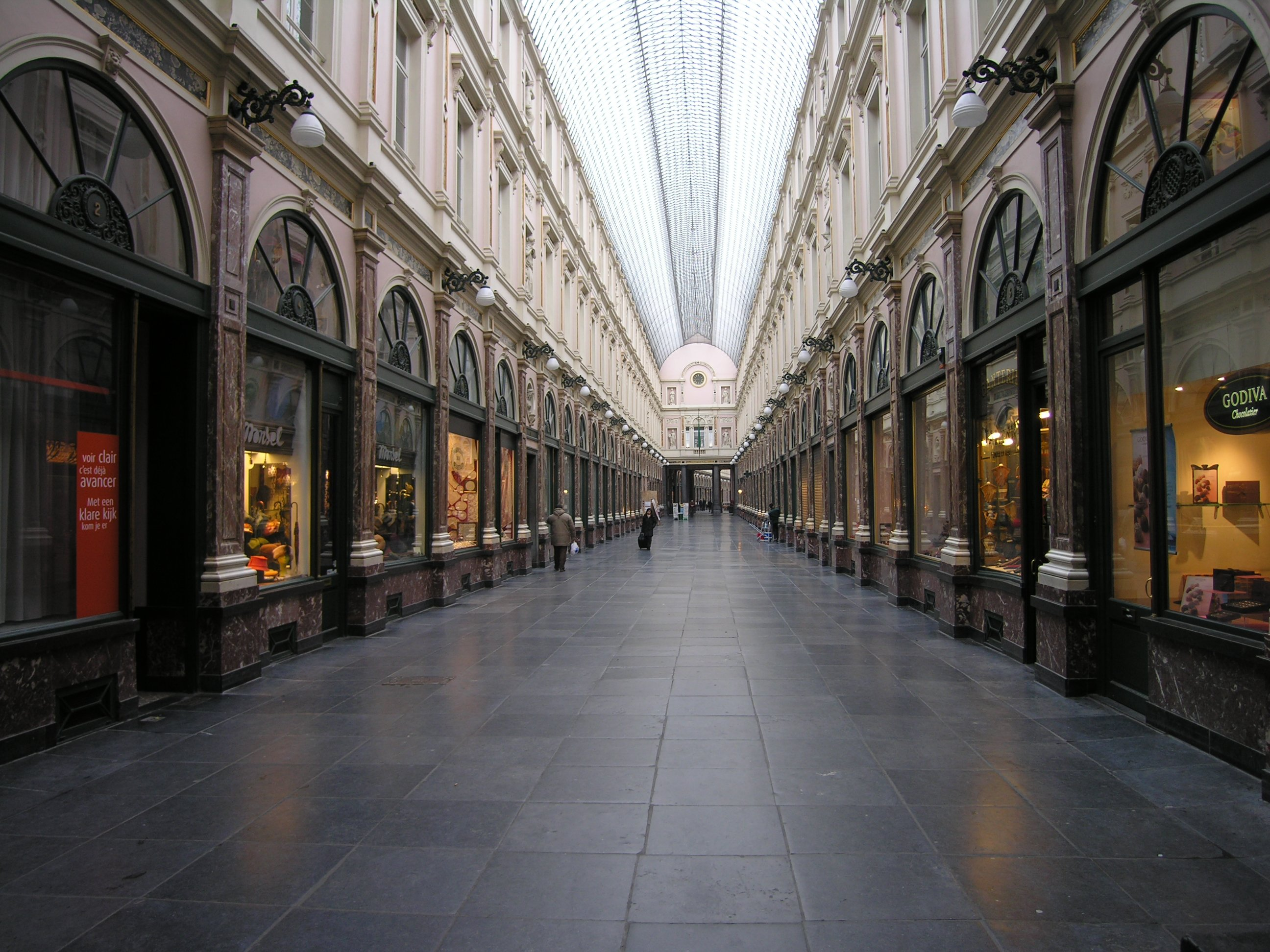
Royal Saint-Hubert Galleries, Brussels (1845–1847)

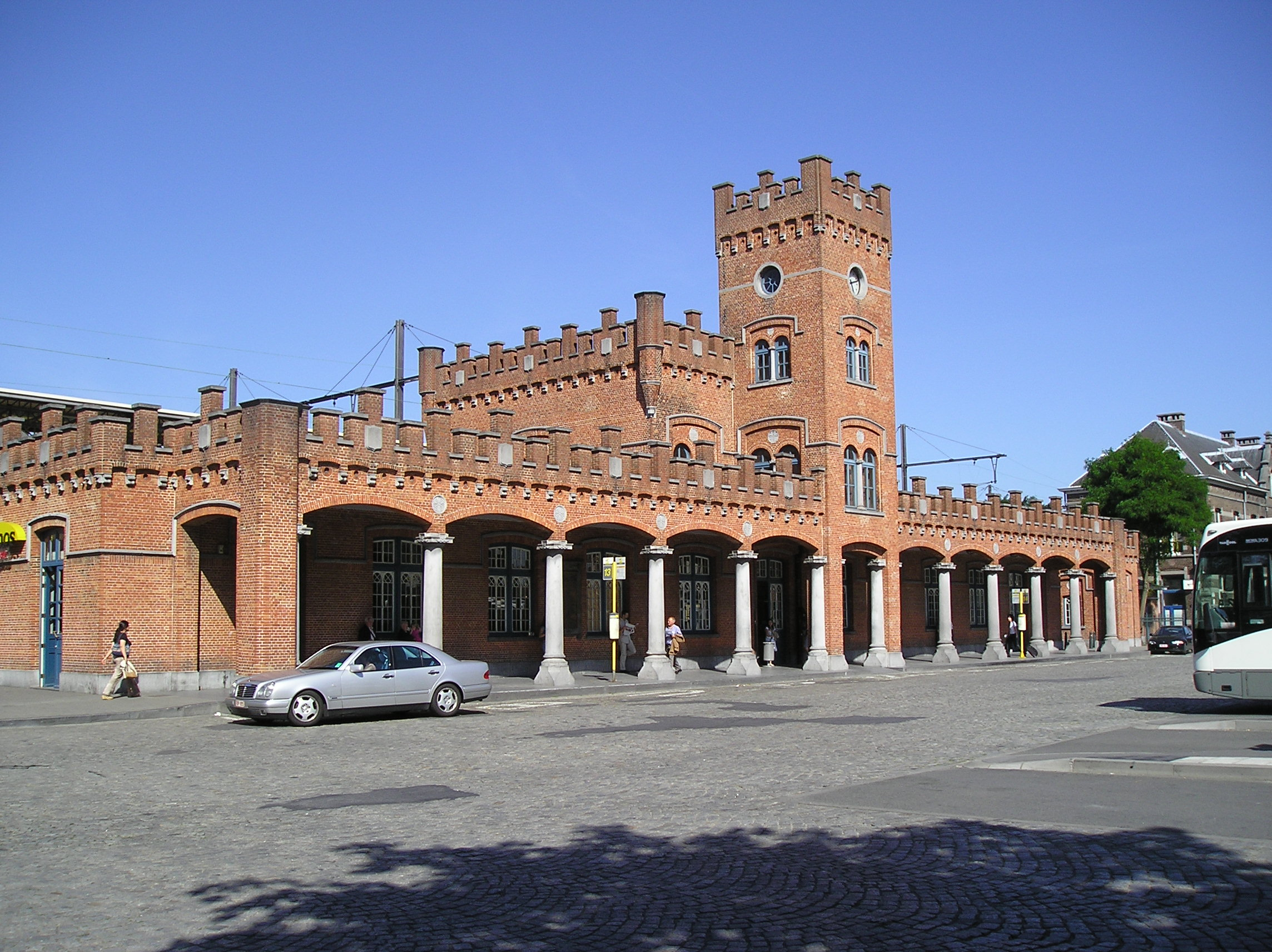
Aalst railway station, Aalst (1856)

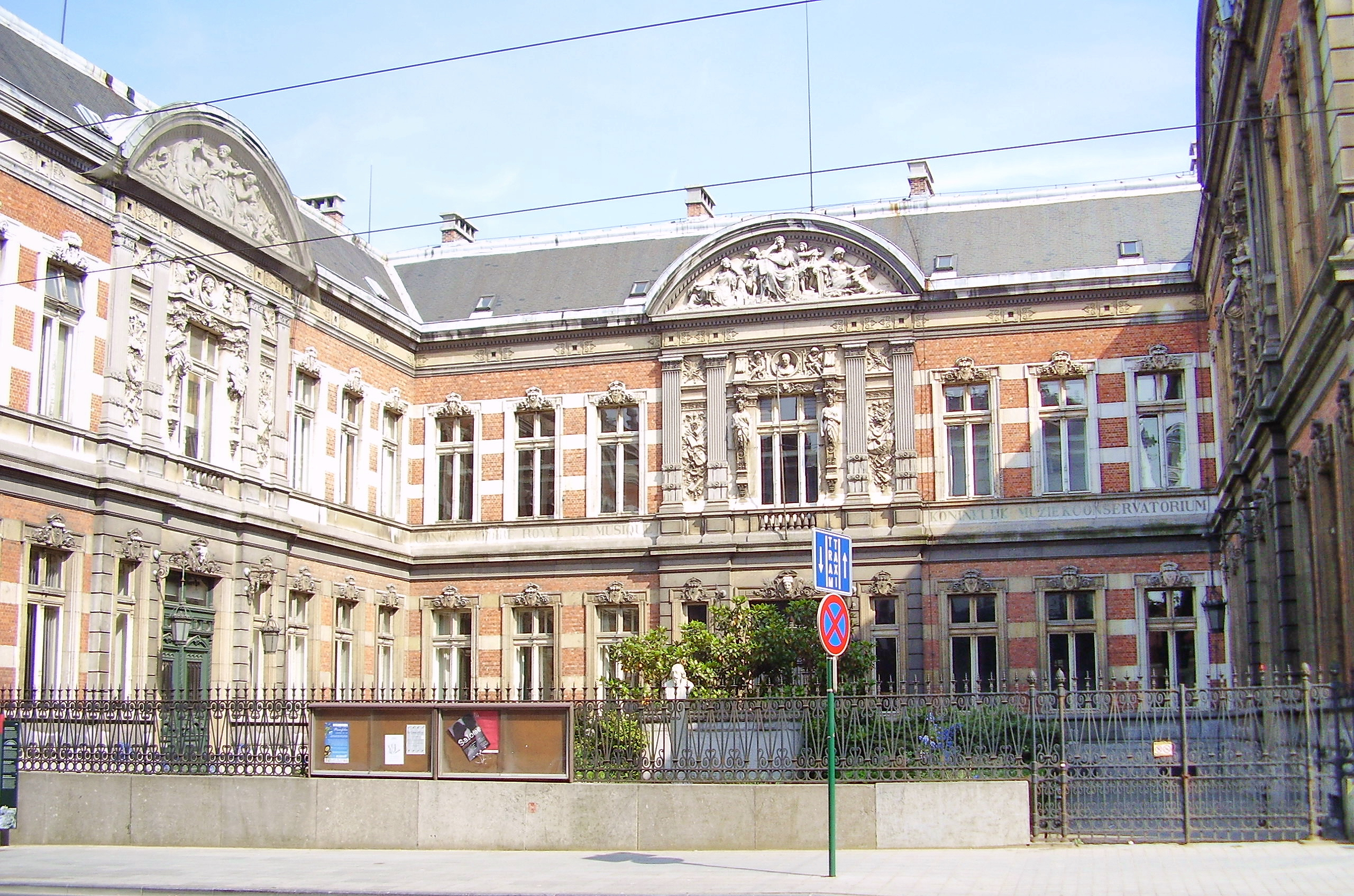
Royal Conservatory, Brussels (1872–1876)
