= Marie Balmary =

French psychoanalyst and scholar

Marie Balmary (born about 1939) is a French psychoanalyst and essayist. In addition to her therapeutic practice, she studies the Bible and Greek mythology with groups of scholars using psychoanalytic theory and, in return, questioning its foundations. She is a clinical psychologist with university training, a psychoanalyst with Lacanian training and a researcher.

== Education ==
Balmary's doctoral thesis devoted to the relationship between Freudian theory and Freud 's family history having been refused before defense; she published it in 1979 under the title L'Homme aux statues: Freud et la faute cachée du père, or The Man with Statues: Freud and the hidden fault of the father . In this work, she revisits Freudian theory based on a reading of the myth of Oedipus, which includes the story of Oedipus' father and the etymological consideration of the words and names of these stories and a study of their relationship with the history of Freud's family.

== Academic career ==
After the publication of her thesis, Balmary began reading the Bible. When she approached the Biblical origin myth, which she considered to be the book of Genesis, she followed the Biblical reading seminar of the Jesuit exegete Paul Beauchamp for three years in the early 1980s, and became close from him.

In her reading, she mobilized psychoanalytic concepts to understand and interpret the founding biblical texts. She pays very close attention to the letter of these texts, in their original languages, Hebrew, Aramaic and biblical Greek, which she learned, and considered any apparent strangeness or "mistakes" of the text, including grammatical errors, as being able to carry meaning.

Her close reading led to new understandings and re-interpretations.

Examples :

- In The Forbidden Sacrifice, she notes that it is Abraham who attributes to God an order (that of sacrificing his son Isaac), though is not explicitly written that he gave it;
- in The Divine Origin, she proposes that the prohibition of the Garden of Eden relates to the confusing of the masculine and the feminine, of man and woman not understanding the other well, and of assimilating it to oneself instead of accepting it as it is. 'he is.
- She also disputes the translation of a sentence ( « You will give birth in pain » ) that God addresses to Eve . A more appropriate translation would be « In sorrow you will give birth to sons ", which would thus refer to « the difficulty for human beings to let their own life, their own words happen in others and particularly the child ».

== Selected publications ==
=== Works ===
- 1979 : L'Homme aux statues. Éditions Grasset. ISBN 9782246075127., Le Livre de Poche Biblio Essais n° 4201 – 1994.
- 1986 : Le Sacrifice interdit. Grasset. 1986. ISBN 9782246376613., Le Livre de Poche Biblio Essais n° 4220 – 07/11/1995 - ( Nicolas Missarel Prize in 1987).
- 1993 : The divine origin. God did not create man, GrassetISBN 9782246475712, 9782246475798, Le Livre de Poche Biblio Essais n° 4271, 1998 .
- 1999 : Abel or the crossing of Eden, GrassetISBN 9782246591313, 9782246591399
- 2001 : I will be who I will be, Exodus 3.14, Alice éditions.
- 2005 : The monk and the psychoanalyst, Albin Michel ,ISBN 9782226159953, Le Livre de Poche Biblio Essais n° 4414 2007 - ( Christian Humanism Prize in 2006).
- 2010 : Freud to God, Actes Sud ,ISBN 978-2-7427-9147-7 .
- 2012 : We will all go to Heaven. The Last Judgment in question, with Daniel Marguerat, Albin Michel,ISBN 9782226320261, Le Livre de Poche Biblio Essais n°... Pocket edition 2016.
- 2016 : Ouvrir Le Livre – An astonished reading of the Bible, with Sophie Legastelois, Albin Michel -ISBN 9782226326171 .

=== Collective works ===
- 2009 : Desire in search of its sources in The sacred, this obscure object of desire, Albin Michel -ISBN 9782226191182 .
- 2009 : Fragility, condition of speech in Fragility, weakness or wealth ?, Albin Michel -ISBN 9782226246516 .
- 2011 : On our paths of revelation in The initiatory journey, Albin Michel -ISBN 9782226220523 .
- 2017 : The spiritual (is not) at the service of the common good – Free yourself from the idolatrous self in For the Common Good collective work, Salvator -ISBN 9782706715693 .

=== Articles ===
- "Genèse du fratricide: Caïn en danger". Les Lettres de la SPF (29): 23–35. 2013..
- "La bénédiction des nations de la terre". Pardès (45): 27–34. January 2009..
- "Le choix de l'image: comme l'Autre ou avec l'Autre". Pardès (39): 35–46. February 2005..
- "Lire la différence des sexes". Revue Projet (287): 23–29. April 2005..
- "Le Guérisseur du " Nous "". Pardès (32–33): 271–279. January 2002..
- "Les lois de l'Homme". Études. 375: 45–58. July 1991.
- "Freud et l'inceste : l'abandon d'une découverte". L'Obs. 25 January 2021..
