= Actes Sud =

French publishing house

- Founded: 1978; 48 years ago
- Founder: Hubert Nyssen
- Country of origin: France
- Headquarters location: Arles
- Key people: Françoise Nyssen
- Publication types: Books
- Official website: www.actes-sud.fr

Actes Sud is a French publishing house based in Arles. It was founded in 1978 by author Hubert Nyssen. By 2013, the company, then headed by Nyssen's daughter, Françoise Nyssen, had an annual turnover of 60 million euros and 60 staff members.

Actes Sud acquired Payot & Rivages in 2013.

== History ==
ACTeS was situated in Paradou, a village in the Vallée des Baux. Here, founder Hubert Nyssen, his wife Christine Le Bœuf, (which was the granddaughter of Belgian banker and patron Henry Le Bœuf), his daughter Françoise Nyssen, Bertrand Py and Jean-Paul Capitani met and founded Actes Sud. In 1983 Actes Sud moved to Arles. The publishing house was incorporated on 2 May 1987.

The Actes Sud was a publication of the "Atelier de cartographie thématique et statistique" (ACTeS).

== Authors ==
A selection of authors Actes Sud published:

- Svetlana Alexievich Nobel Prize in Literature
- Paul Auster, Prix Médicis étranger for Léviathan
- Henry Bauchau, Prix du Livre Inter, 2008 for Le Boulevard périphérique
- Jeanne Benameur, Grand prix RTL-Lire, 2013 for Profanes
- Nina Berberova
- Sophie Calle
- Magyd Cherfi, Price of Le Parisien Magazine, 2016 for Ma part de Gaulois
- Kamel Daoud, Prix Goncourt for Debut novel, 2015 for Meursault, contre-enquête
- Mathias Énard, Prix du Livre Inter, 2009 for Zone (Roman) and third Prix Goncourt at Actes Sud 2015 for Boussole
- Jérôme Ferrari, second Prix Goncourt at Actes Sud, 2012 for The Sermon on the Fall of Rome
- Laurent Gaudé, first Prix Goncourt for a book Actes Sud published, 2004 for Le Soleil des Scorta
- Günter Grass, Nobel Prize in Literature
- Nancy Huston, prix du Livre Inter, 1997 for Instruments des ténèbres, prix Femina, 2006 for Lignes de faille
- Imre Kertész, Nobel Prize in Literature
- Camilla Läckberg
- Stieg Larsson
- Alberto Manguel
- Nicolas Mathieu, Prix Goncourt winner in 2018 for Leurs enfants après eux (And Their Children After Them), winner of the Prix Erckmann-Chatrian in 2014 for Aux animaux la guerre (translated to English as Of Fangs And Talons)
- Cormac McCarthy
- Wajdi Mouawad
- Olivier Py
- Pierre Rabhi
- Jean-Michel Ribes
- Siri Hustvedt
- Kathryn Stockett
- Thuận
- Yasmine Chami

== Prizes ==
- 2004: the book The Scortas' Sun (Le Soleil des Scorta) by Laurent Gaudé, was the first book published by Actes Sud, receiving a Prix Goncourt (Prix Goncourt/Roman). The book sold 400,000 copies.
- 2012: Sermon sur la chute de Rome by Jérôme Ferrari was the second book published by Actes Sud honoured by the Prix Goncourt.
- 2015: Compass (Bussole) by Mathias Énard, also published by Actes Sud, received the Prix Goncourt.
- 2015: Svetlana Alexievich won the Nobel Prize in Literature.
- 2017: The order of the day (L'Ordre du jour) by Éric Vuillard, published by Actes Sud, got the Prix Goncourt.
- 2018: Nicolas Mathieu wins the Prix Goncourt for his novel Leurs enfants après eux.

== Programme ==
Actes Süd provides a catalogue naming 11,500 titles. It has more than two hundred employees, mostly at the sites in Arles and Paris, about twenty external advisors and a plethora of translators work in France and elsewhere.

== Book series ==
- Actes noirs
- Actes Sud BD
- Actes Sud - Classica
- Actes Sud Junior
- Actes Sud - L’An 2
- Actes noirs
- Actes Sud - Papiers
- Actes Sud / Solin
- Actes Sud / Sindbad
- Babel
- Babel noir
- Domaine du possible
- Un endroit où aller
- Exofictions
- Photo Poche
- Un pas de côté - directed by Charlotte Casiraghi
