= Paul Dujardin =

Paul Dujardin may refer to:

- Paul Dujardin (water polo)
- Paul Dujardin (art historian)
- Paul Dujardin (engraver)
