= Hubert Nyssen =

French publisher and poet (1925–2011)

- Born: 11 April 1925; Brussels, Belgium
- Died: 12 November 2011 (aged 86); Paradou, France
- Occupations: Novelist; Essayist; Poet; Publisher
- Spouse: Christine Le Bœuf
- Children: Françoise Nyssen

Hubert Nyssen (French pronunciation: [ybɛʁ nisɛn]; 11 April 1925 – 12 November 2011) was a Belgian-French writer, publisher and founder of the Éditions Actes Sud.

== Biography ==
Hubert Nyssen grew up in Boitsfort (today a commune in Brussels) and settled in Provence in 1968. He became a naturalised French citizen in 1976. A novelist, diarist, essayist and poet, he was the author of numerous books.

During his childhood in Brussels, under the German occupation, he was influenced by his grandfather who gave him a taste for intellectual culture. After his university studies at the Free University of Brussels, he founded an advertising company, which became one of the most prosperous in Belgium. At the same time, he ran his own cultural center in Brussels, spoke on the radio and published his first literary works. In 1978, breaking up with his past as a French businessman, he founded in Arles the publishing company Éditions Actes Sud with the help of his wife Christine Le Bœuf, a descendant of a rich family of Belgian businessmen, Henry Le Bœuf and Albert Thys. In this new life, his dispositions for business and his literary talents were soon to bear fruit, whereas at the time, setting up a publishing house in the south of France constituted an unprecedented audacity, all large French publishing houses being Parisian. It was a challenge and a real "cultural exception". Among his many editorial successes, he made known the American author Paul Auster in French translation and published in French the Swedish thriller trilogy Millennium.

Nyssen was also a talented author and published more than forty works in the fields of novel, theater, poetry and essays.

Doctor of Arts, he taught at the University of Provence and University of Liège. The University of Liège, which hosts its archives, the Nyssen Fund, appointed him Doctor honoris causa in 2003.

In 2011, he was made Chevalier of the Order of the Mérite wallon.

On Nyssen's death, the Argentinian writer Alberto Manguel paid tribute to him:

What was always disconcerting with Nyssen, was his ability to bring together a diverse group of people without ever placing himself at the center, as an invisible gravitational force that lends movement and grace to other bodies. All his conversations had in common the same character: he was a mere witness.

— in Le Devoir, 29 November 2011

== Works ==
=== Work and short stories ===
- 1973: Le Nom de l'arbre, Éditions Grasset, Passé-Présent n° 53, Babel n° 435.
- 1979: La Mer traversée, Grasset, Prix Méridien.
- 1982: Des arbres dans la tête, Grasset, Grand Prix du roman de la Société des gens de lettres.
- 1983: Éléonore à Dresde, Actes Sud, Prix Valery-Larbaud, Prix Franz-Hellens. Babel n° 14.
- 1995: Les Rois borgnes, Grasset, Prix de l'Académie française. J'ai Lu n° 2770.
- 1989: Les Ruines de Rome, Grasset, Babel n° 134.
- 1991: Les Belles Infidèles, Actes Sud (Polar Sud)
- 1992: La Femme du botaniste, Actes Sud, Babel n° 317.
- 1995: L'Italienne au rucher, Éditions Gallimard. Babel n° 664 under the title La leçon d'apiculture, ISBN 2742752544 2004
- 1998: Le Bonheur de l'imposture, Actes Sud
- 2000: Quand tu seras à Proust la guerre sera finie, Actes Sud
- 2002: Zeg ou les Infortunes de la fiction, Actes Sud
- 2004: Pavanes et Javas sur la tombe d'un professeur, Actes Sud
- 2008: Les Déchirements, Actes Sud
- 2009: L'Helpe mineure, Actes Sud
- 2012: Dits et Inédits, Actes Sud

=== Essays ===
- 1969: Les Voies de l'écriture, Mercure de France, 1969.
- 1972: L'Algérie, Arthaud, 1972.
- 1981: Lecture d'Albert Cohen, Actes Sud
- L'Éditeur et son double, Actes sud, Vol. I : 1988; vol II : 1990; vol. III : 1996.
- 1993: Du texte au livre, les avatars du sens, Nathan
- 1997: Éloge de la lecture, Les Grandes Conférences, Fides
- 2002: Un Alechinsky peut en cacher un autre, Actes Sud
- 2002: Variations sur les variations, Actes Sud
- 2002: Sur les quatre claviers de mon petit orgue : lire, écrire, découvrir, éditer, Leméac / Actes Sud
- 2004: Lira bien qui lira le dernier : lettre libertine sur la lecture, Labor / Espace de libertés. Babel n°705.
- 2006: La Sagesse de l'éditeur, L'Œil neuf éditions
- 2006: Neuf causeries promenades, Leméac / Actes Sud
- 2007: Le mistral est dans l'escalier, journal de l'année 2006, Leméac / Actes Sud
- 2008: L'Année des déchirements, journal de l'année 2007, Leméac / Actes Sud
- 2009: Ce que me disent les choses, journal de l'année 2008, Leméac / Actes Sud
- 2010: À l'ombre de mes propos, journal de l'année 2009, Actes Sud

=== Poems ===
- 1967: Préhistoire des estuaires, André de Rache
- 1973: La Mémoire sous les mots, Grasset
- 1977: Stèles pour soixante-treize petites mères, Saint-Germain-des-Près
- 1982: De l'altérité des cimes en temps de crise, l'Aire
- 1991: Anthologie personnelle, Actes Sud
- Eros in trutina, Leméac / Actes Sud

=== Opera and theatre ===
- 2000: Mille ans sont comme un jour dans le ciel, Actes Sud
- 2006: Le Monologue de la concubine, Actes Sud
- 2008: L'Enterrement de Mozart + CD, Actes Sud / Musicatreize

=== Youth ===
- 1996: L'Étrange Guerre des fourmis, Actes Sud Junior
- 1996: Le Boa cantor, Actes Sud Junior, 1996. Version + CD, 2003.
- 1999: Un point c'est tout, Actes Sud Junior
- L'Histoire du papillon qui faillit bien être épinglé + CD, Actes Sud Junior, 2002

=== Studies on the work and the editorial activity ===
- 2006: Pascal Durand (dir.), L'Écrivain et son double : Hubert Nyssen, Liège/Arles, CELIC, Actes Sud
- 2012: Jacques De Decker, Le Dossier Hubert Nyssen, Brussels, Le Cri/Académie royale de langue et de littérature françaises
- 2013: Benoît Denis and Pascal Durand, « Postface, Éléments biographiques et Repères bibliographiques », in Hubert Nyssen, Le Nom de l'arbre, Brussels, Communauté française de Belgique, coll. Espace Nord, n° 316

== Distinctions and tributes ==
- Member of the Académie royale de langue et de littérature françaises de Belgique (elected 14 November 1998, at seat 33.)
- Docteur honoris causa of the University of Liège (2003)
- Officier de la Légion d'honneur (2005)
- Chevalier de l'ordre du Mérite wallon (2011)
