= Henry Le Bœuf =

Belgian banker, patron of the arts and music lover (1874-1935)

- Born: 1874; Schaerbeek
- Died: 1935 (aged 60–61)
- Occupations: Banker; Patron of the arts

Henry Le Bœuf (1874 in Schaerbeek – 1935) was a Belgian banker, patron of the arts and music lover.

The stepson of Albert Thys, whose daughter Louise he married, he left his name to the Main Hall of the 2,200-seat Centre for Fine Arts, Brussels (established 1929), of which he promoted the foundation and funding. This room was built by the architect Victor Horta.

Henry Le Boeuf occupied the castle of his father-in-law at Dalhem and contributed to the beautification of this locality by various urbanistic interventions still visible today: embellishments of houses and medieval ruins, restoration of the city hall (commemorative plaque sealed in the gable), construction of residences for artists and musicians in particular, paving of various streets.

His granddaughter Christine was co-founder, with her husband Hubert Nyssen, of Éditions Actes Sud.
