= Laurent Gaudé =

French writer (born 1972)

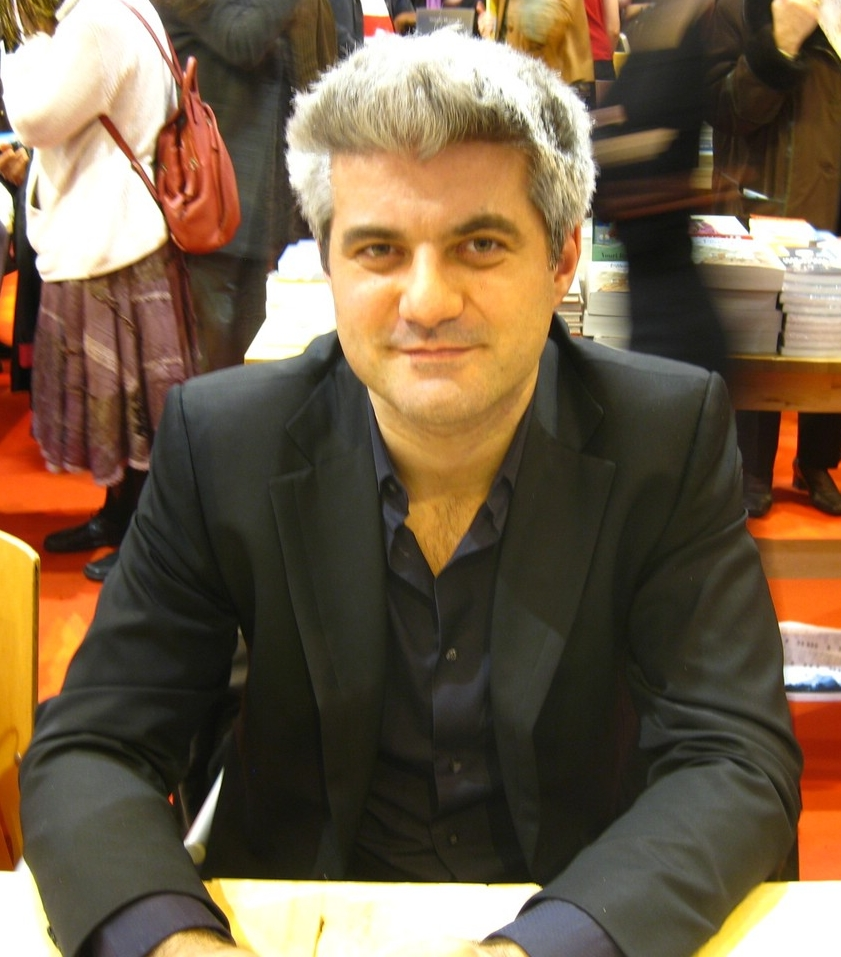
- Gaudé at Salon du Livre in Paris in 2009
- Born: 6 July 1972 (age 54); Paris, France
- Education: Université Paris III
- Writing career
- Genre: Plays

Laurent Gaudé (born 6 July 1972) is a French writer.

He studied theater and has written many dramatic works, among them Onysos le furieux, Cendres sur les mains, Médée Kali, and Le Tigre bleu de l'Euphrate.

== Life ==
Gaudé was born in Paris. After a master's in humanities at the Université Paris III, for which he presented a dissertation entitled Le thème du combat dans la dramaturgie comptemporaine française (The theme of combat in the French contemporary dramaturgy), supervised by Michel Corvin (1994), then a post-graduate diploma at the same university, for which he presented a dissertation entitled Le conflit dans le théâtre contemporain (The conflict in contemporary theater), supervised by Jean-Pierre Sarrazac (1998), he wrote plays (1999).

His first play, Combat de possédés, was published in 1999. It has been performed in Germany and has been read at the Royal National Theatre in London. The second play, published in 2000, is Onysos le Furieux. It is an epic monologue, written in only 10 days during the spring of 1996. Laurent Gaudé has also written other plays such as Pluie de Cendres, Cendres sur les mains, Médée Kali or Le Tigre bleu de l'Euphrate.

In 2002, his second novel, La Mort du roi Tsongor, allowed him to be cited for the Prix Goncourt and above all to be rewarded by the Prix Goncourt des lycéens and the Prix des librairies. Two years later, he won the Prix Goncourt as well as the Prix Jean Giono with his novel Le Soleil des Scorta (The Scortas' Sun) which has been a best-seller (80 000 copies sold between the novel publication and the awarding in 2004).

Gaudé's 2022 science fiction thriller Chien 51 was adapted into a film by the same name by Cédric Jimenez in 2025.

== Awards ==
In 2002 he won the Prix Goncourt des lycéens and in 2003 the Prix des Libraires for La Mort du roi Tsongor. Two years later, he won the Prix Goncourt and the Prix Jean Giono for his novel The Scortas' Sun (French: Le Soleil des Scorta). In 2019, his book Nous l’Europe, banquet des peuples, won the European Book Prize and Salina, les trois exils won the Grand prix du roman métis.

== Novels ==
- Cris: roman, Actes Sud, 2001, ISBN 9782742731695
- Battle of will, Translators David Greig, Oberon, 2002, ISBN 978-1-84002-308-4
- La mort du roi Tsongor: roman, Actes sud, 2002, ISBN 978-2-7427-3924-0; Actes Sud, 2005, ISBN 978-2-7427-5298-0
  - Death of an ancient king, Harper Perennial, 2002, ISBN 978-0-00-717028-9
  - The death of King Tsongor, Toby Press, 2003, ISBN 978-1-59264-030-0
  - Death of an Ancient King, Translator Adriana Hunter, MacAdam/Cage, 2007, ISBN 978-1-59692-224-2
- Le soleil des Scorta: roman, Actes sud, 2004, ISBN 9782742751419
  - The Scortas' sun, Hesperus, 2006, ISBN 978-1-84391-705-2
- Le Tigre bleu de l'Euphrate, Actes Sud, 2002, ISBN 978-2-7427-3948-6
- Eldorado, Actes Sud, 2006, ISBN 978-2-7427-6261-3
  - Eldorado, Translator Adriana Hunter, MacAdam Cage, 2008, ISBN 978-1-59692-297-6
- La porte des enfers: roman, Actes Sud, 2008, ISBN 978-2-7427-7704-4
- Sodome, ma douce, Actes Sud, 2009, ISBN 978-2-7427-8012-9
- Dans la nuit Mozambique et autres récits, Actes Sud, 2007, ISBN 978-2-7427-6781-6
- Chien 51, Actes Sud/Lemeac, 2022.
