= Centre for Fine Arts, Brussels =

Cultural venue in Brussels, Belgium

Centre for Fine Arts
- Palais des Beaux-Arts (French); Paleis voor Schone Kunsten (Dutch)
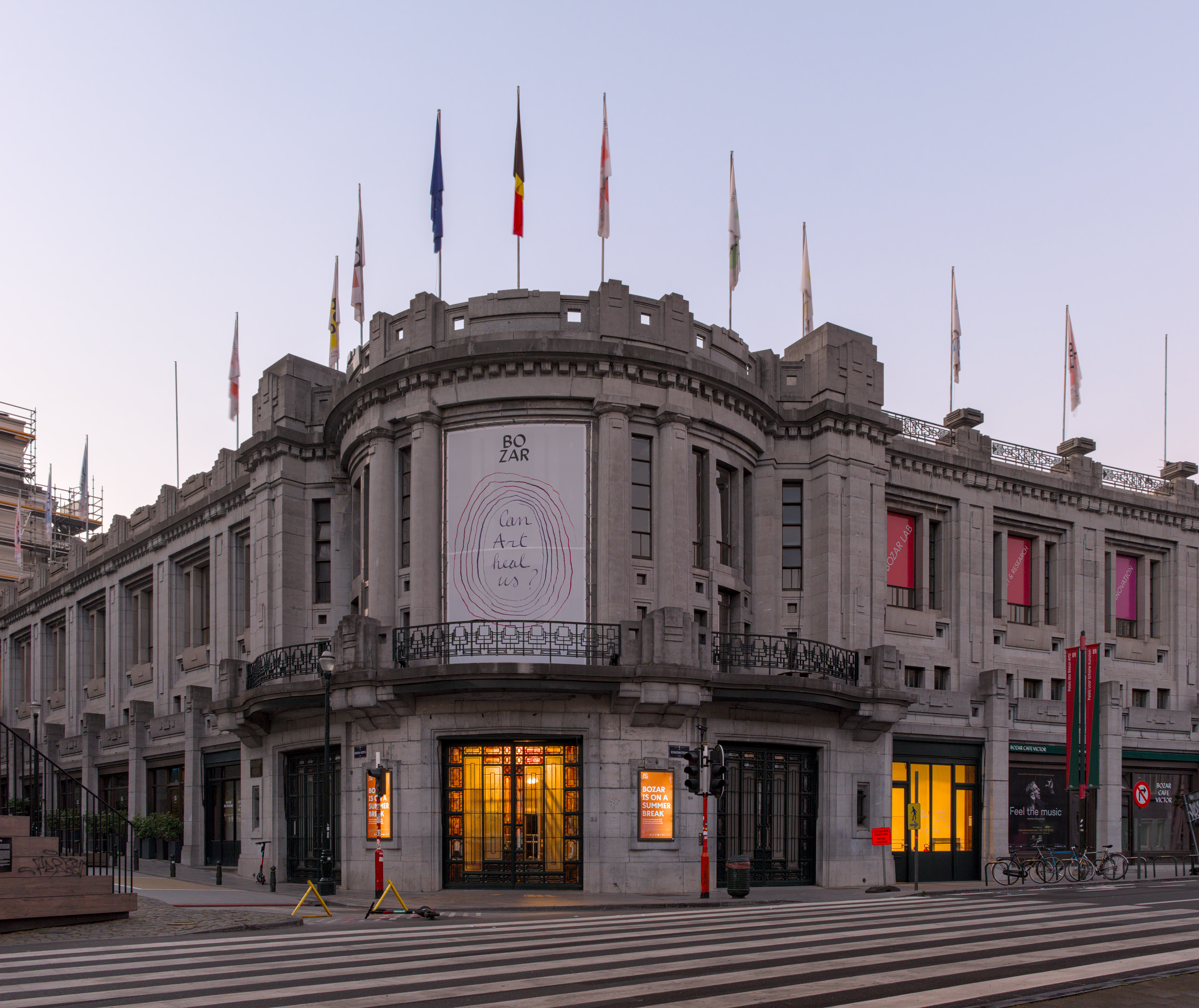
- Exterior of the Centre for Fine Arts (BOZAR) building in Brussels
- Interactive map of Centre for Fine Arts
- Address: Rue Ravenstein / Ravensteinstraat 23; 1000 City of Brussels, Brussels-Capital Region; Belgium
- Coordinates: 50°50′37″N 4°21′35″E
- Type: Performing arts centre
- Public transit: Brussels-Central; 1 5 Gare Centrale/Centraal Station and Parc/Park

Construction
- Opened: 4 May 1928; 98 years ago
- Architect: Victor Horta

Website
- www.bozar.be/en

The Centre for Fine Arts (French: Palais des Beaux-Arts, pronounced [palɛ de boz‿aʁ]; Dutch: Paleis voor Schone Kunsten, pronounced [paˈlɛis foːr ˈsxoːnə ˈkʏnstə(n)]) is a multi-purpose cultural venue in the Royal Quarter of Brussels, Belgium. It is often referred to as BOZAR (a homophone of Beaux-arts) in French or by its initials PSK in Dutch. This multidisciplinary space was designed to bring together a wide range of artistic events, whether music, visual arts, theatre, dance, literature, cinema or architecture.

The building housing the Centre for Fine Arts was designed by the architect Victor Horta in Art Deco style, and completed in 1929 at the instigation of the banker and patron of the arts Henry Le Bœuf. It includes exhibition and conference rooms, a cinema and a concert hall, which serves as home to the Belgian National Orchestra (BNO). It is located at 23, rue Ravenstein/Ravensteinstraat, between the Hôtel Ravenstein and the headquarters of BNP Paribas Fortis, and across the street from the Ravenstein Gallery.

== History ==
=== Planning and inception (1856–1922) ===
The idea of a Centre for Fine Arts in Brussels dates to the mid-19th century. In 1856, a government commission explored a venue for concerts and major exhibitions. By 1866, a law allocated one million Belgian francs for a hall for exhibitions and public ceremonies. The authorities even considered using the Bourse Palace or other sites, including the Parc du Cinquantenaire/Jubelpark, the Botanical Garden, and the Avenue Louise/Louizalaan, but none of these plans came to fruition.

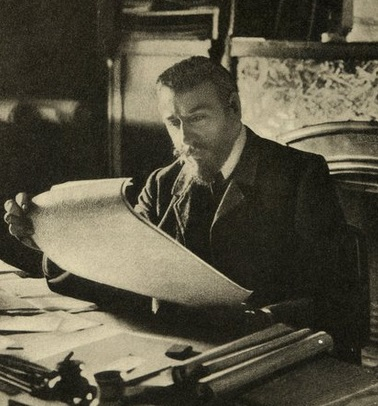
The Centre for Fine Arts' architect, Victor Horta

In 1871, the Royal Academy of Belgium initiated a commission to explore a building for exhibitions and public ceremonies. The architect Alphonse Balat presented plans for a Palais des Beaux-Arts on the Rue de la Régence/Regentschapsstraat, approved in 1872. Construction began in 1874, and the building opened on 1 August 1880 with a major exhibition of Belgian art. It hosted events until 1887, when the Museum of Ancient Art's collections reduced available space, leaving a gap for contemporary art and a large concert hall.

In 1913, King Albert I and Queen Elisabeth, keen supporters of music and the arts, urged the City of Brussels' then-mayor, Adolphe Max, to create a "temple dedicated to music and the visual arts" in Brussels. By July 1914, the city architect François Malfait had designed concert halls and exhibition spaces on the Rue Ravenstein/Ravensteinstraat, in keeping with the Royal Quarter's 18th-century style, but the outbreak of World War I halted the plans.

In 1919, the Minister of Public Works Edward Anseele revived the project through a commission chaired by the senator Émile Vinck, aiming to foster Belgium's post-war cultural renaissance and promote national art internationally. Vinck appointed Victor Horta to design the new Centre for Fine Arts, surpassing a competing plan by Georges Hano. The City of Brussels ceded a plot in November 1919.

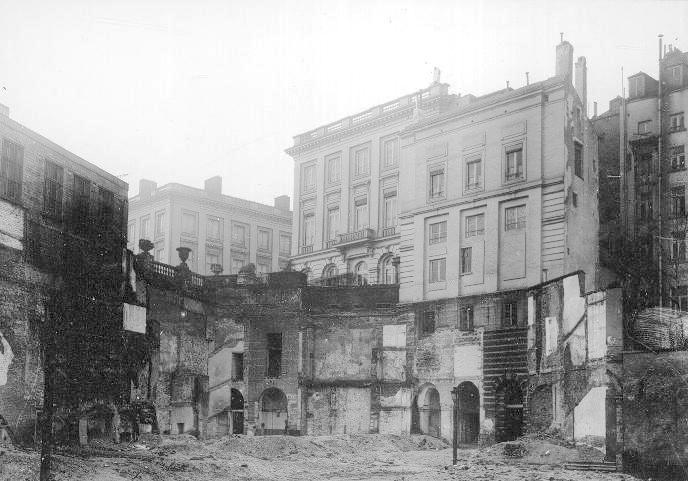
The Rue d'Isabelle/Isabellastraat, on the site of the Centre for Fine Arts in 1911

Between October 1919 and August 1922, Horta produced some five versions of the design. The 8,000 m^{2} (86,000 sq ft) plot was irregularly shaped, with a steep incline between the Rue Royale/Koningsstraat and the much lower Rue Terarken/Terarkenstraat, and the new building was intended to face the Rue Ravenstein. The alignment of the Rue Ravenstein had been altered between 1911 and 1913 and was built on a concrete structure, situating the construction site below the elevated street. Beyond the slope, planning rules and city council requirements posed further constraints: an easement preserving the view from the Royal Palace to the Town Hall's spire prohibited construction beyond the 18th-century garden wall of the Hôtel Errera, while the city required shops along the Rue Ravenstein to revitalise the area and generate rental income.

In June 1920, the government requested a 9-million-franc loan for construction, but the Senate approved only 100,000 francs, stalling the project. Vinck then proposed a private company to fund and operate the venue, with the state guaranteeing the loan. On 4 April 1922, the non-profit organisation Société du Palais des Beaux-Arts was established, allowing work to begin. Horta began designing the Centre for Fine Arts in a geometric classical style influenced by Art Deco, distinct from his earlier Art Nouveau works.

It was not until 1922, under the non-profit organisation led by the banker and patron of the arts Henry Le Bœuf, that the plans assumed their final form. They featured two major exhibition circuits around the concert hall and sculpture hall, with entrances merged into a corner rotunda giving the building grandeur while harmonising with adjacent architecture. The interior included a small recital auditorium, a Latin cross-shaped concert hall, and varied flooring and finishes, including marble, herringbone parquet, and terrazzo, originally in ochre and gold. Reinforced concrete allowed Horta to design a sculptural horseshoe-shaped concert hall combining economic viability with intimacy for performers, addressing Eugène Ysaÿe's desire to feel surrounded by the audience. Tensions arose between Horta and Le Bœuf over structural systems and acoustics, eventually resolved with input from the Parisian acoustician Gustave Lyon in May 1925.

=== Construction and early years (1923–1931) ===
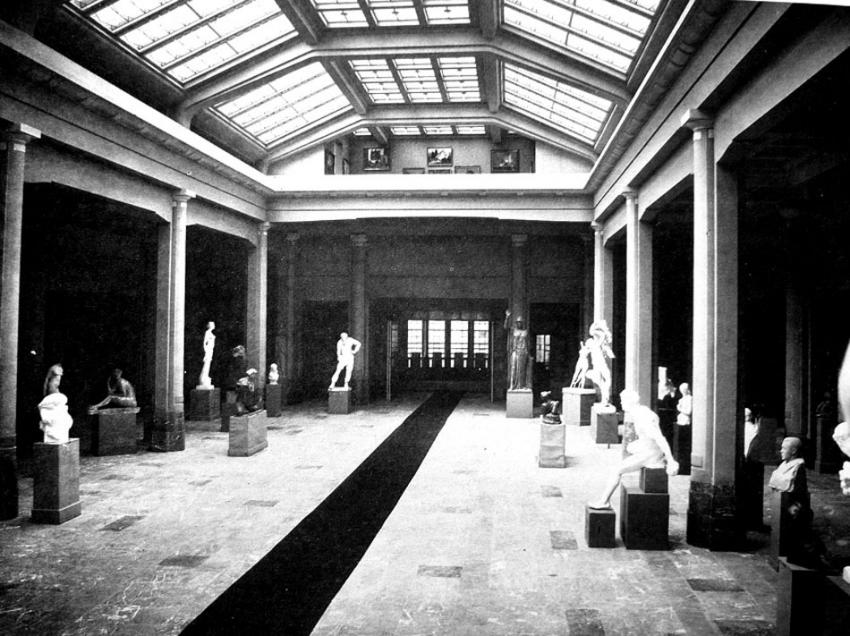
The Victor Horta Hall (Great Sculpture Hall) in 1925

Construction officially began in 1923, shaped by the site's challenges: the irregular slope, the need to incorporate shops along the main façade, and height restrictions to preserve the royal sightline. In late October 1919, Victor Horta had assured Émile Vinck's commission that the building would be largely completed by May 1920, with final touches to the concert hall, decorative arts floors, and gardens finished by July. Even accounting for the Senate's funding delays, this was highly optimistic. Ultimately, construction would take seven years, largely due to the steeply sloping site, the need to remove old foundations, shore up neighbouring buildings, and manage rainwater and sewage. The decision to build mainly with exposed reinforced concrete added further complexity, requiring intricate formwork, and a planned steel concert hall was replaced with concrete at Armand Blaton's suggestion. Financial difficulties, caused by limited subscriptions and the Belgian franc's depreciation, also slowed progress.

Although still unfinished, the Centre for Fine Arts welcomed visitors to its exhibition rooms on 4 May 1928, including the royal family and many distinguished guests. King Albert I, in his address, stressed the importance of nurturing intellectual and artistic life as part of Belgium's post-war recovery. The opening showcased works from Belgium, France, Russia, and Switzerland, and on 18 May, the sculpture hall was inaugurated by Sergei Diaghilev's Ballets Russes performing La Sylphide.

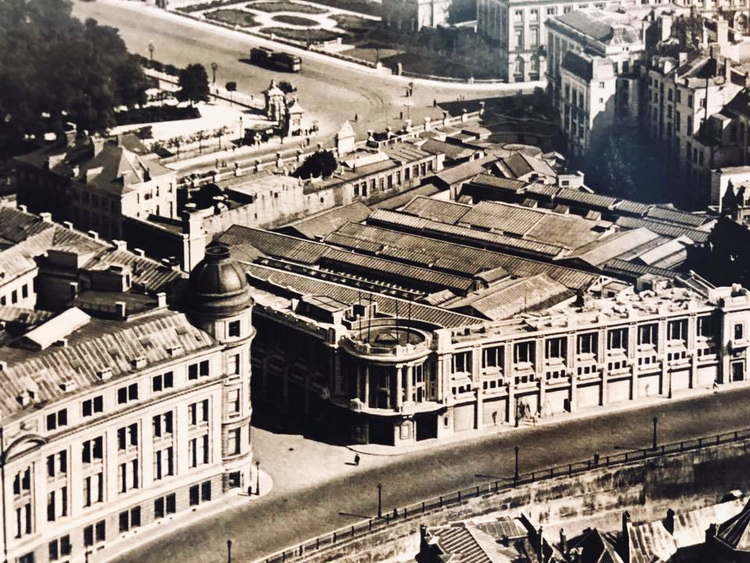
Aerial view of the Centre for Fine Arts in 1926, during construction

From the outset, the board of directors managed 40 exhibition rooms, offering 1,225 m (4,019 ft) of picture rail. Under the programme manager Charles Leirens, the 1928–29 season included major retrospectives of Antoine Bourdelle, James Ensor, and Gustave Van de Woestijne, with catalogues available and works for sale. Architectural exhibitions began in 1930, highlighted by the 3rd Congrès Internationaux d'Architecture Moderne (CIAM) and a full-size CUBEX kitchen by Louis-Herman De Koninck, followed by a monographic exhibition on Frank Lloyd Wright. The 627-seat chamber music hall opened on 18 November 1928 with the Pro Arte Quartet and quickly hosted top-tier recitals, jazz concerts, and dance performances. The adjoining small recital hall, called the Studio, opened the next day for screenings, including Paris 20 Years Ago, Max Fleischer cartoons, and Roy Del Ruth's Wolf's Clothing, earning praise from the press for its comfortable seats and excellent films. Finally, on 10 October 1929, the large concert hall welcomed its inaugural performance, attended by the royal family, featuring works by César Franck and Peter Benoit.

Under Charles Leirens, the Centre for Fine Arts became a lively cultural hub for exhibitions, concerts, theatre, and films, but his ambitious programme caused financial losses. In 1929, the board created independent auxiliary societies to manage events, share profits, and assume losses. Leirens was criticised for poor administration and neglecting room hire, and in October 1931, he was replaced by General Paul Giron, prompting press ridicule.

==== First renovation ====
Although the Centre for Fine Arts opened in 1928, hosting exhibitions, concerts, and other events, its design soon struggled to meet evolving artistic demands. Even before completion, disputes over the chamber music hall's decoration arose, and the large concert hall was still under construction. Within six months, the small recital hall was converted into a Studio for film screenings, with curtains and a screen installed, a modest change that foreshadowed more extensive modifications in the 1930s and post-war period. Later, the Studio, chamber music hall, and concert hall were equipped for sound films, and rooms originally intended for exhibitions or sculpture often found new uses, such as the large sculpture hall hosting car shows or private events instead of monumental works.

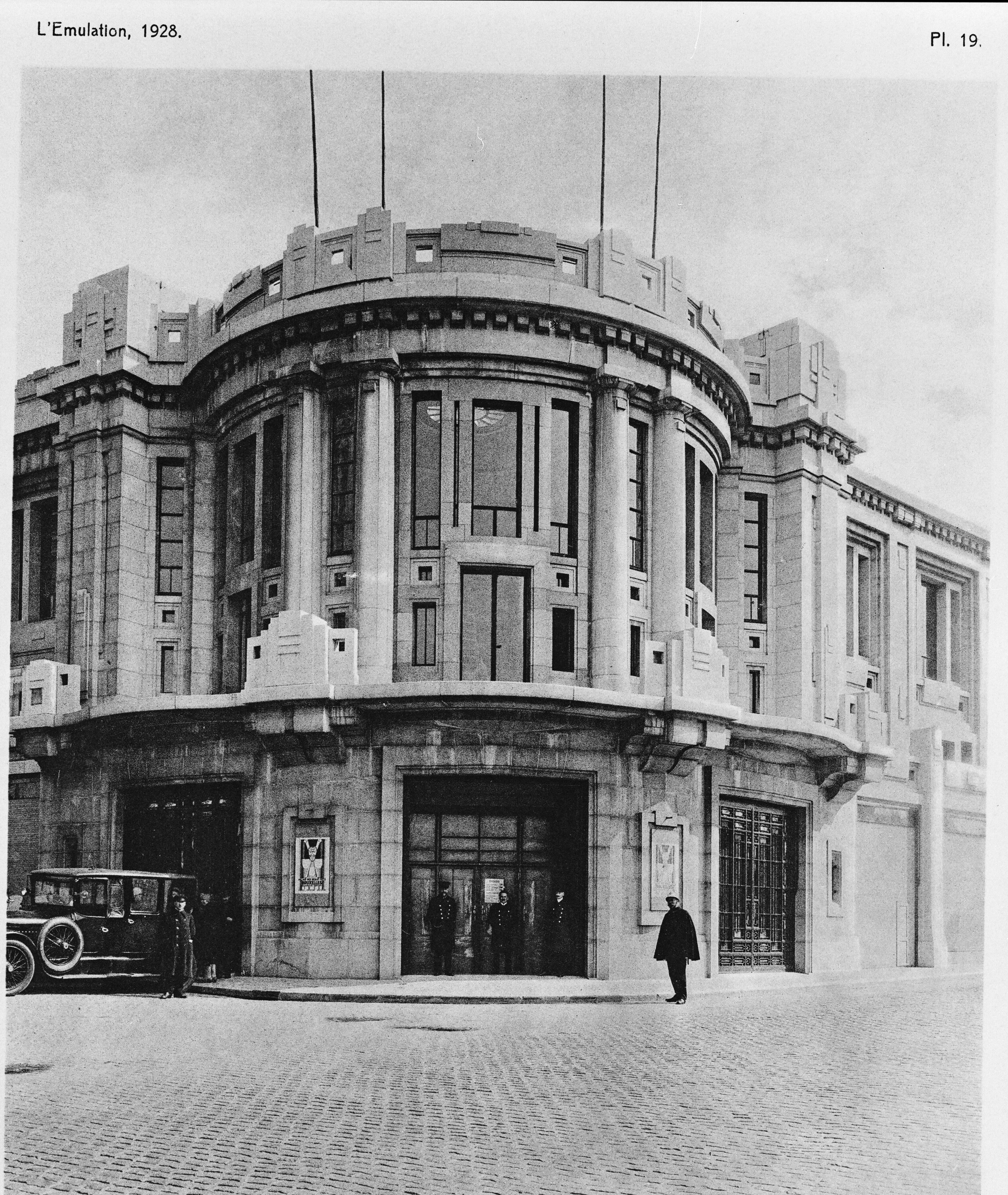
The Centre for Fine Arts in 1928, shortly after completion

=== Paul Giron (1931–1946) ===
Despite the 1929 stock market crash and ensuing economic crisis, the Centre for Fine Arts became a major cultural venue of Brussels in the 1930s. Under the auxiliary societies, it hosted exhibitions, concerts, plays, dance, films, and lectures. Henry Le Bœuf's Société Philharmonique (transl. Philharmonic Society), aiming to introduce the public to little-known composers, staged numerous concerts from 1931, with the Brussels Symphony Orchestra becoming the Centre's resident ensemble in 1936 as the Belgian National Orchestra, alongside visiting foreign orchestras.

Visual arts exhibitions, managed by the Société Auxiliaire des Expositions (transl. Auxiliary Exhibition Society) under Claude Spaak and Robert Giron, ranged from week-long shows to month-long retrospectives, highlighting Belgian and international artists such as Permeke, Magritte, Modigliani, Dufy, Van Dongen, Chagall, and more. The first International Photography Exhibition took place in 1932, featuring artists including Willy Kessels, Eugène Atget, Germaine Krull, and Man Ray. Rooms were also hired for annual salons, commercial events, public auctions, and diverse displays, from furniture and cars to competitive exams, banquets, and lottery draws. The large concert hall hosted symphonies, theatre, and dance, while the chamber music hall accommodated regular theatrical performances due to Horta's lack of a permanent theatre.

=== World War II ===
Despite the German occupation, Brussels' cultural life persisted. At the Centre for Fine Arts, Paul Giron kept the halls active to prevent full requisition: Concerts de Midi were moved to the rotunda, daily Belgian films screened in the Studio, and a small artists' circuit featured seven painters and a sculptor. Minor exhibitions of Belgian artists such as Evenepoel, Paulus, Wouters, Permeke, and Ensor alternated with German art displays. Auctions continued, and the Philharmonic maintained concerts while avoiding works by Jewish composers or those linked to the Nazis. Some rooms were requisitioned for occupier events, including lectures, concerts, fashion shows, and lunches.

During this period, several cultural initiatives were founded: Jeunesses Musicales (1940) by Marcel Cuvelier aimed to engage youth in music and protect them from Nazi propaganda; Toneeljeugd (1941), a Flemish-speaking artistic movement, later merged into Kunst- en Cultuurverbond; and Le Rideau de Bruxelles (1943) by Claude Étienne promoted contemporary Belgian playwrights and remained active at the Centre until 2014, eventually becoming a travelling theatre company.

=== Post-WWII ===
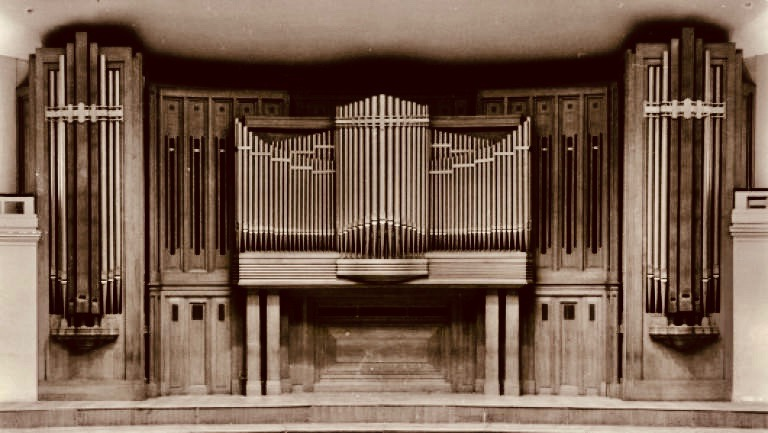
The organ in the Henry Le Bœuf Hall, 1950s

After the post-war restrictions, Brussels' cultural life rebounded with economic growth and renewed consumer interest. Borders reopened, enabling major exhibitions and events, such as the first Festival Mondial du Film et des Beaux-Arts in June 1947, which screened films from 17 countries alongside a surrealist painting exhibition featuring Dalí, Delvaux, and Ernst. The Société Philharmonique resumed concerts, inviting conductors like Roger Désormière and hosting the 1948 Festival de Bruxelles. Cuvelier also oversaw the revival of the Queen Elisabeth Competition in 1951.

In 1950, the Exploration du Monde documentary and lecture series began, showing pioneering colour films and attracting audiences across Brussels, Wallonia, and Luxembourg, eventually reaching 20 million viewers. To manage such events, the Association pour la Diffusion Artistique et Culturelle (ADAC) was founded in 1951 by Pierre Janlet, Paul Willems, and Pierre Arty. ADAC presented a wide range of cultural programmes, music, dance, theatre, jazz, cinema, folk traditions, and more, including Keïta Fodéba's Les Ballets Africains (1953) and Maurice Béjart's Ballet of the 20th Century. Funded largely by Exploration du Monde, ADAC staged 50,000 shows with over 25 million attendees from 1951 to 2001. Theatre gained prominence under Alain Leempoel (1988–2004), but financial difficulties forced ADAC to cease operations in 2006.

==== Expo 58 and modernisation ====
The 1958 Brussels World's Fair (Expo 58) showcased the "American way of life" and colour televisions, reflecting a more democratic society and rising car ownership. The Centre for Fine Arts hosted a successful festival alongside Expo 58, with 51 concerts, 20 exhibitions, 20 theatre shows, and several ballets, including a memorable Peking Opera performance. Technological advances in electronics enabled new electro-acoustic sound techniques, exemplified by the Philips Pavilion, where Le Corbusier, Iannis Xenakis, and Edgar Varèse staged Poème électronique with 425 speakers and 20 amplifiers. From 1958 to the early 1970s, the Centre continued high-profile events, including exhibitions of Victor Vasarely (1960), the CoBrA movement (1962), the Sistine Chapel Choir (1963), Henry van de Velde's centenary (1963), the Kirov Ballet (1966), and surrealist painters (1967).

Post-war interest in cinema prompted the Centre to modernise its Studio and chamber music hall. Between 1956 and 1959, Constantin Brodzki and Corneille Hannoset converted the Studio into a proper cinema with tiered seating and a colour projection booth. They had previously designed the Blanc et Noir (transl. White and Black) exhibition circuit in 1953. A partial renovation of the chamber music hall began in 1959 and was fully completed by Hervé Gilson in 1986–1989. Rising demand for a dedicated cinema led Jacques Ledoux to found the Film Museum in 1962, which moved into the former decorative art hall in 1967, with Brodzki and Hannoset converting the space into a modern cinema museum with screening rooms and a permanent exhibition.

==== May 68 ====
The May 1968 protests also affected the Centre for Fine Arts, with demonstrators occupying the sculpture hall on 28 May. Sit-ins at exhibitions, including Aspects of Flemish Expressionism, remained largely non-violent, featuring meetings, debates, artist talks, and cultural events, involving figures like Marcel Broodthaers, Roger Somville, Serge Creuz, and Hugo Claus. The protests culminated in the Cahier de Revendications des Artistes Belges (transl. Belgian Artists' List of Demands), proposing a House of Culture with collegial management and more spaces for contemporary art.

In response, the Centre held a 1969 architectural competition to create a public forum reflecting democratic cultural policy. The winning design by Lucien Jacques Baucher, Michel Draps, and Marc Libois was inspired by modular tubular structures seen during the Dutch Days and the Centre Pompidou in Paris. The new Forum, opened in 1970, hosted lectures, performances, concerts, exhibitions, a bookshop, restaurant, and radio studio. Programming was managed by Action Culturelle, reflecting the 1968 vision. Over time, the adaptation of spaces by various arts associations led to compartmentalisation, contributing to the building's deterioration by the 1990s, with a leaking roof and loss of Horta's original spatial design.

==== Europalia ====
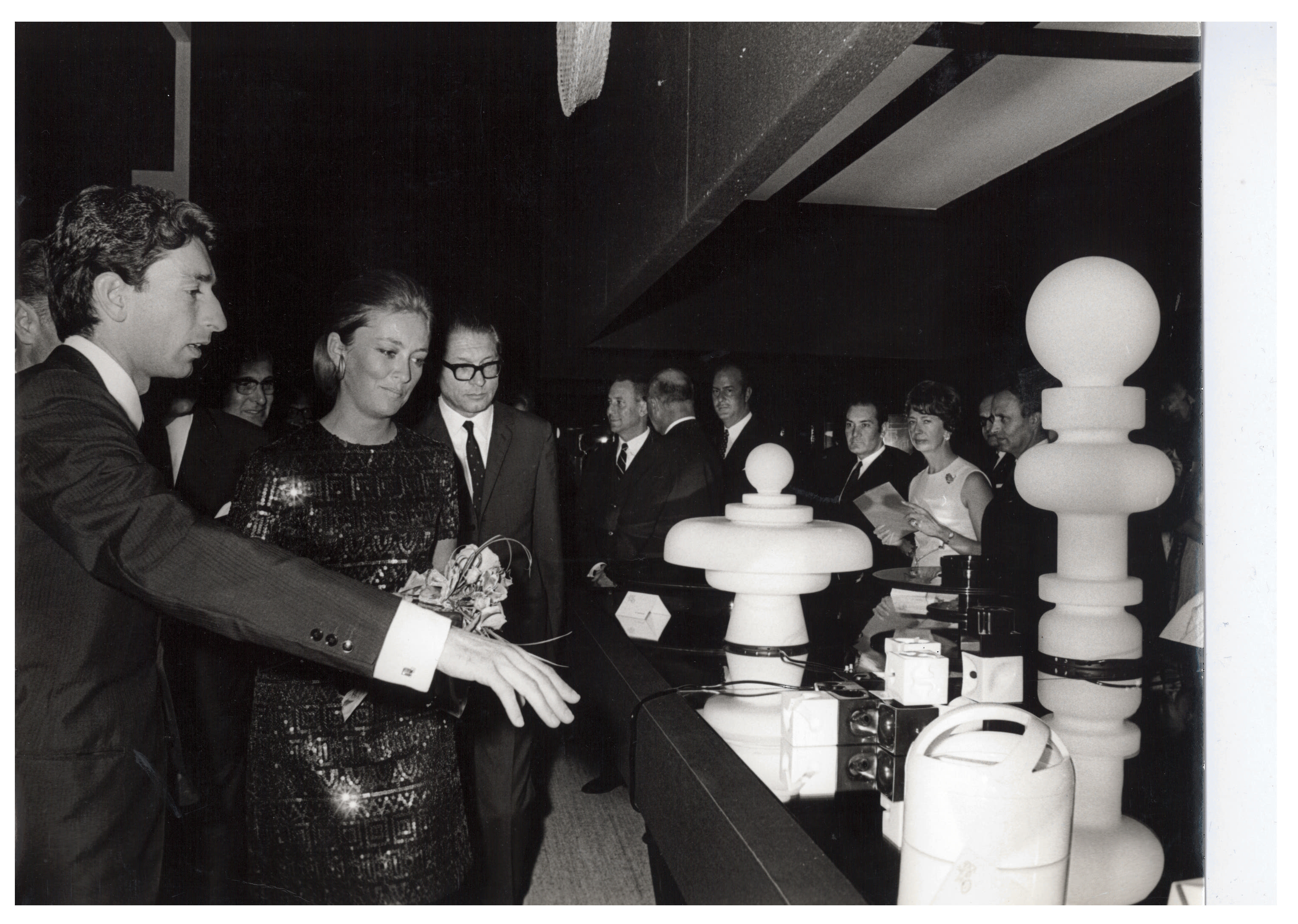
Princess Paola visits during Europalia Italia, 1969

Inspired by Expo 58, Pierre Arty launched a new cultural festival in 1969 to showcase European arts in Belgium. The first Europalia, focusing on Italy, ran from 9 September to 10 October 1969, organised by ADAC. The non-profit Europalia was established in 1970, followed by festivals highlighting the Netherlands, the UK, France, and West Germany. From 1989, the festival expanded to non-European countries, including Japan, Mexico, China, Brazil, India, and Turkey.

A planned 1996 festival on Turkey was replaced by a tribute to Victor Horta, which renewed appreciation for his mature works, including the Centre for Fine Arts, and led to the removal of the Forum's tubular structure to restore the sculpture hall. Europalia was held annually from 1998 to 2003, then returned to a biennial format.

==== Financial difficulties and restructuring ====
By the mid-1960s, the Centre for Fine Arts faced growing financial difficulties, with revenues insufficient to cover building maintenance and staff salaries. After internal disagreements, the board turned to the Belgian state for support. On 1 March 1971, Prime Minister Gaston Eyskens announced government backing on the condition that linguistic parity be respected, ensuring representation of both French-speaking and Flemish communities on the board. Financial pressures continued into the early 1980s, and from 1984, a public interest body, under state supervision, managed the premises while existing partners remained private legal entities. A review in the 1990s led to the establishment of Palace of Fine Arts SA in 1999, a public limited company with a social purpose. Its articles of association, formalised in 2001 by royal decree, set up a cultural institution to manage the building and organise events, modelled on major international cultural venues. The activities of the Société Auxiliaire des Expositions and the Société Philharmonique were transferred to the new company,

=== 21st century ===
==== Rebranding as BOZAR ====
Since 2002, the Belgian federal institution has officially used the brand name BOZAR, which encompasses eight artistic departments: BOZAR Expo, BOZAR Music, BOZAR Cinema, BOZAR Dance, BOZAR Theatre, BOZAR Literature, BOZAR Studios, and BOZAR Architecture. BOZAR is home to the Belgian National Orchestra. The finals of the prestigious Queen Elisabeth Competition for classical singers and instrumentalists are also held there. Up to ten exhibitions a year are organised at BOZAR, featuring artists such as Jeff Wall, Luc Tuymans, Frida Kahlo, Lucas Cranach, Gilbert & George, Wim Delvoye, Venetian and Flemish Masters, Keith Haring, and thematic shows like It's not only rock'n'roll Baby.

==== Second and third renovations ====
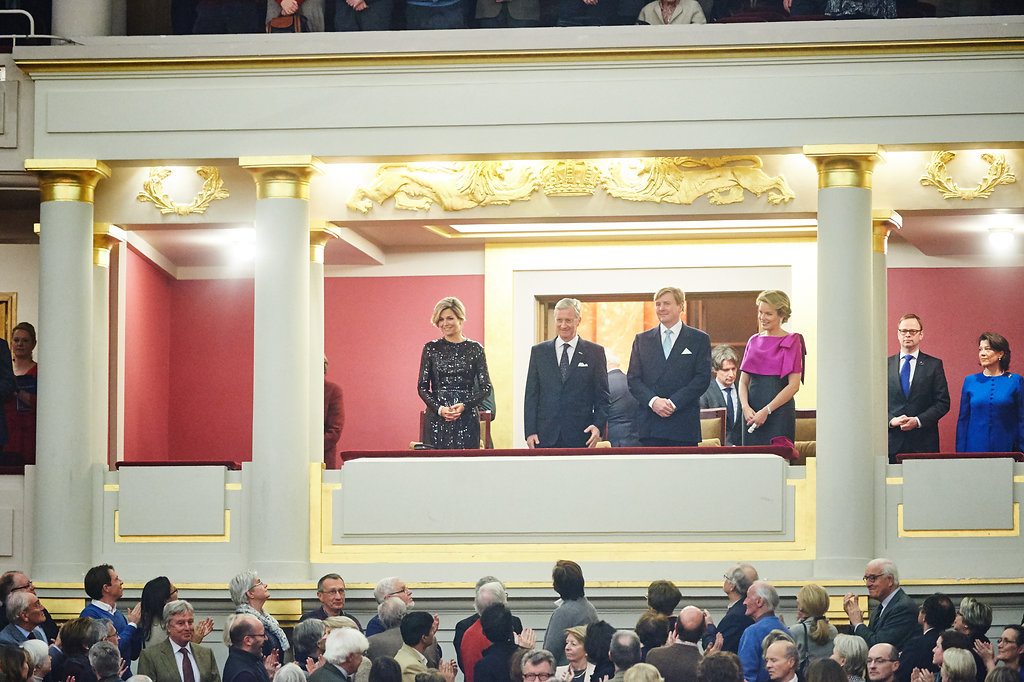
King Philippe, Queen Mathilde and the Dutch monarchs in the Royal Box, 2016

From 2004, the architect and Horta specialist Barbara Van der Wee led a master plan to restore the Centre's original 1928 spatial structure while adapting it to contemporary requirements. The project began with the dismantling of the Forum, formerly the sculpture hall, and the relocation of offices to the Ravenstein Gallery, along with the move of CINEMATEK's offices and documentation centre to the Hôtel Ravenstein. This allowed the restoration of key spaces, including the Bertouille Rotunda above the main entrance. While the initial phase kept most of the building operational, some aspects of user comfort, including disabled access, signage, furnishings, and lighting, remained unaddressed. The second phase focused on integrating the building experience for all users and its surroundings. A large project team, including Barbara Van der Wee Architects, SumProject, Ney & Partners, and Robbrecht & Daem architecten, oversaw the modernisation. Robbrecht & Daem designed Café Victor, occupying the former shop premises on the Rue Ravenstein, while Van der Wee continued restoring the rotunda to its original colour scheme and revitalising the flat roofs along the Rue Ravenstein and the Rue Baron Horta/Baron Hortastraat, transforming them into outdoor spaces for summer artistic programmes.

On 18 January 2021, a fire broke out on the roof. There was considerable damage, including from extinguishing water, especially to the Henry Le Bœuf Hall and the organ. After 100 days, the Henry Le Bœuf Hall reopened, but damage was still visible. The roofs, technical installations and exhibition halls were completely renovated, and BOZAR reopened in July 2023.

In 2025, BOZAR installed a new L-Acoustics sound system in the Henry Le Bœuf Hall, featuring L2D speakers and an L-ISA processor. The system, designed to support non-classical music programming, provides immersive spatial audio and allows the venue to operate without rented equipment.

== Facilities ==
The long entrance hall or vestibule leads to the large concert hall (named after Henry Le Bœuf), with seating capacity for 2,200, where the Belgian National Orchestra performs and where the finals of the Queen Elisabeth Competition are held. On the ground floor, the former Great Sculpture Hall (now the Victor Horta Hall) gives access via its Grand Staircase to the exhibition rooms upstairs. Beneath the Horta Hall are the Chamber Music Hall (or Hall M) with 476 seats, a foyer for the Henry Le Bœuf Hall, and the Recital Hall (or Studio) with 210 seats. These concert halls are directly accessible from the Rue Terarken. The multi-purpose Terarken Hall is also located on this side of the building.

The Centre for Fine Arts houses CINEMATEK, where the Royal Belgian Film Archive screens films, among other things (in two halls, Ledoux and Plateau). The Henry Le Bœuf Hall, Chamber Music Hall, and Studio are also used for film screenings, and theatrical performances take place in the Studio or the Hall M. Since 2021, the rooftop terrace has been open to the public, and concerts, lectures and film evenings are organised there during the summer months.

BOZAR regularly hosts art exhibitions dedicated to, among others, Constant Permeke (2012), Cy Twombly (2012), Francisco de Zurbarán (2014), Peter Paul Rubens (2014), Michaël Borremans (2014), Ottoman art (2015), Rembrandt (2016), Theo van Doesburg (2016), Yves Klein (2017), Picasso (2017), Constantin Brâncuși (2019), Keith Haring (2020), Roger Raveel (2021), and David Hockney (2021).

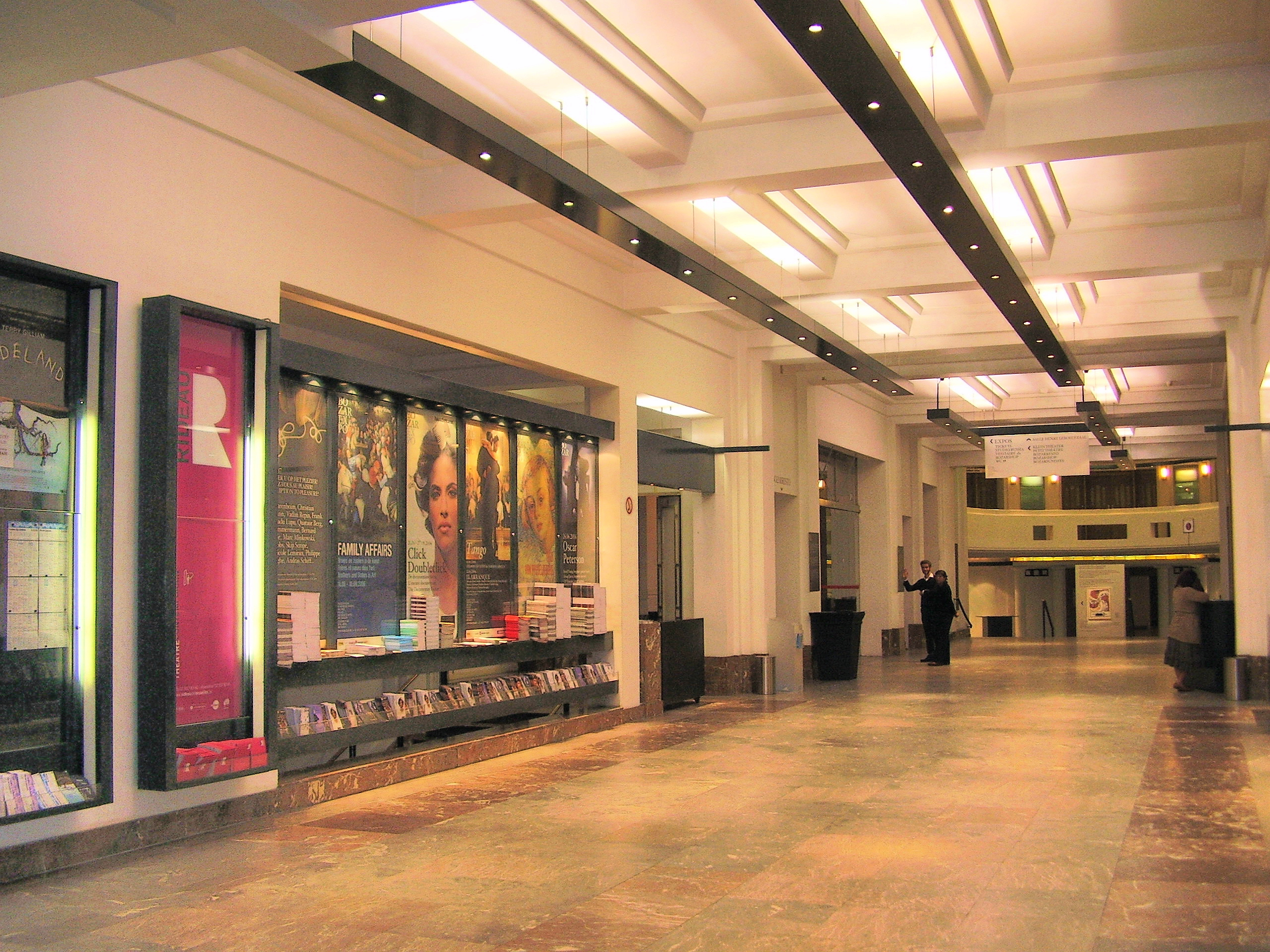
Vestibule

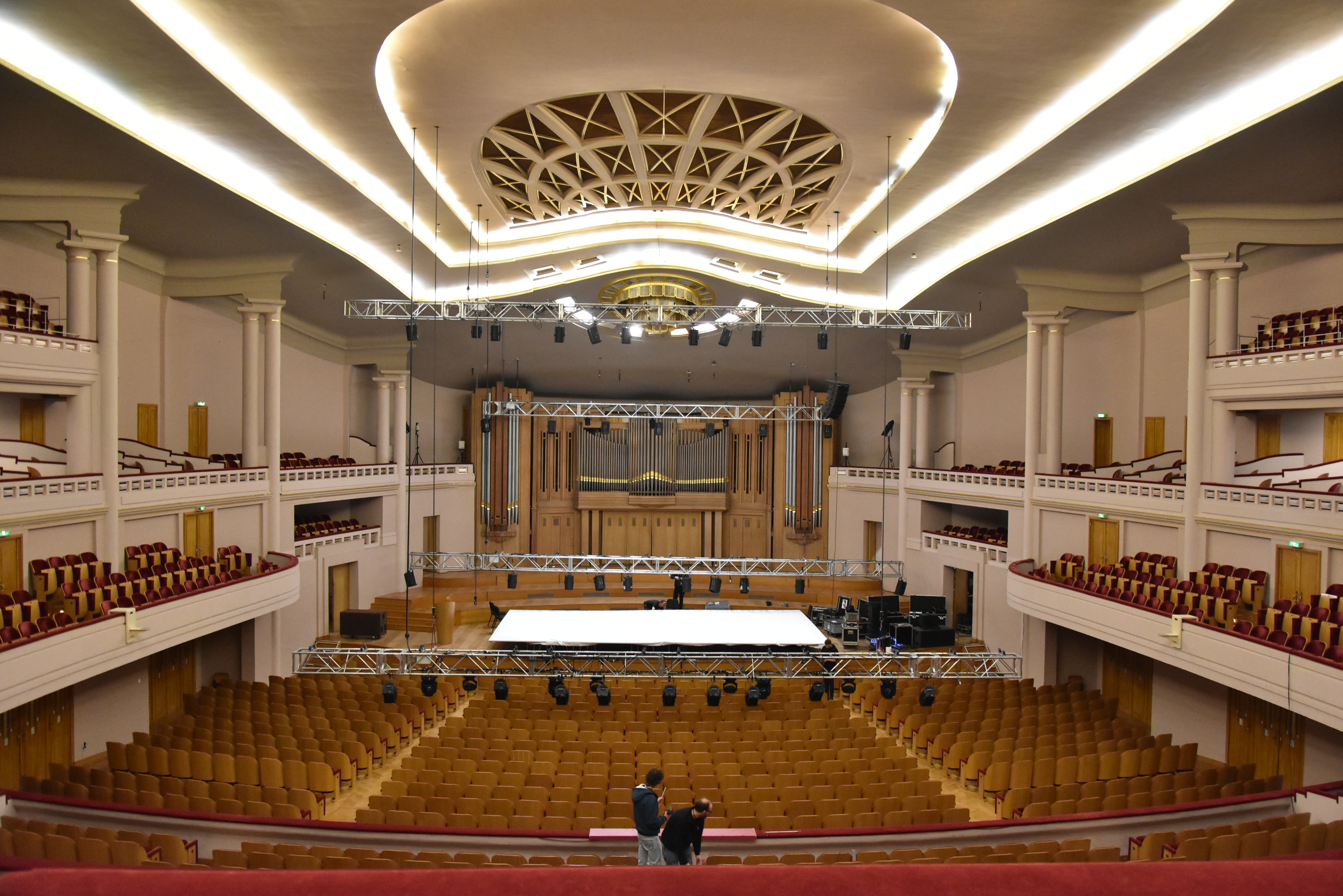
Henry Le Bœuf Hall

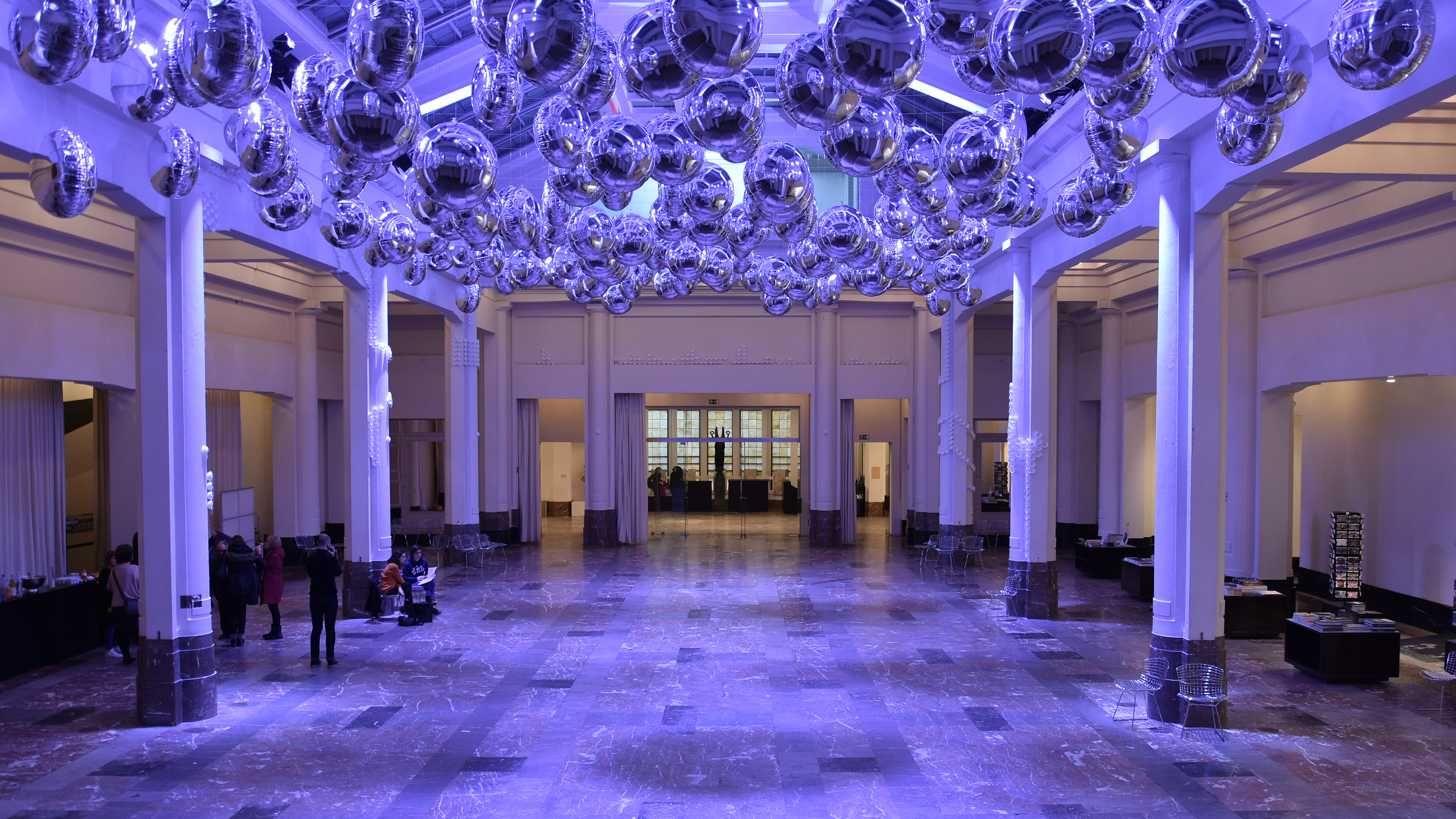
Victor Horta Hall

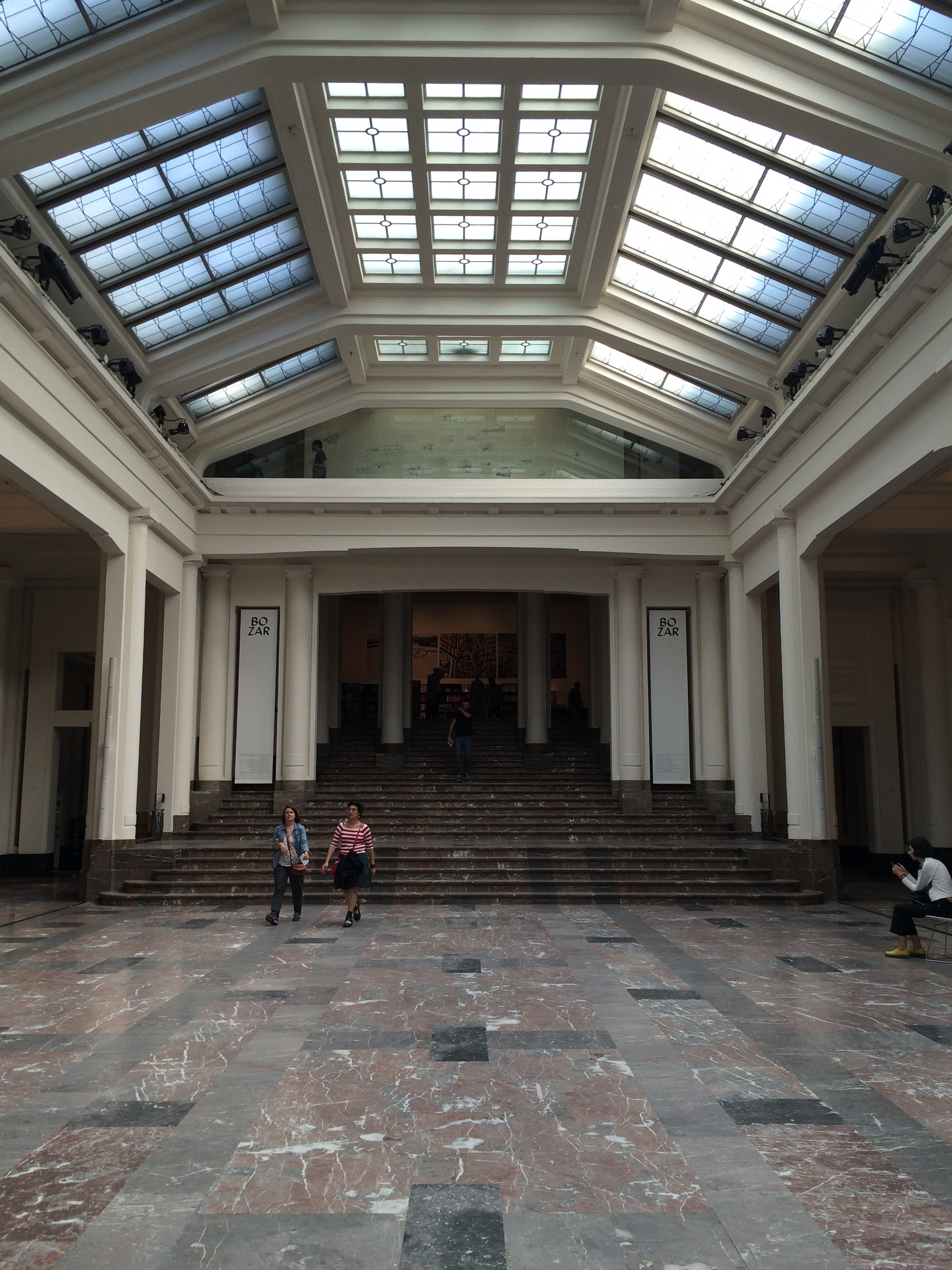
Exhibition hall

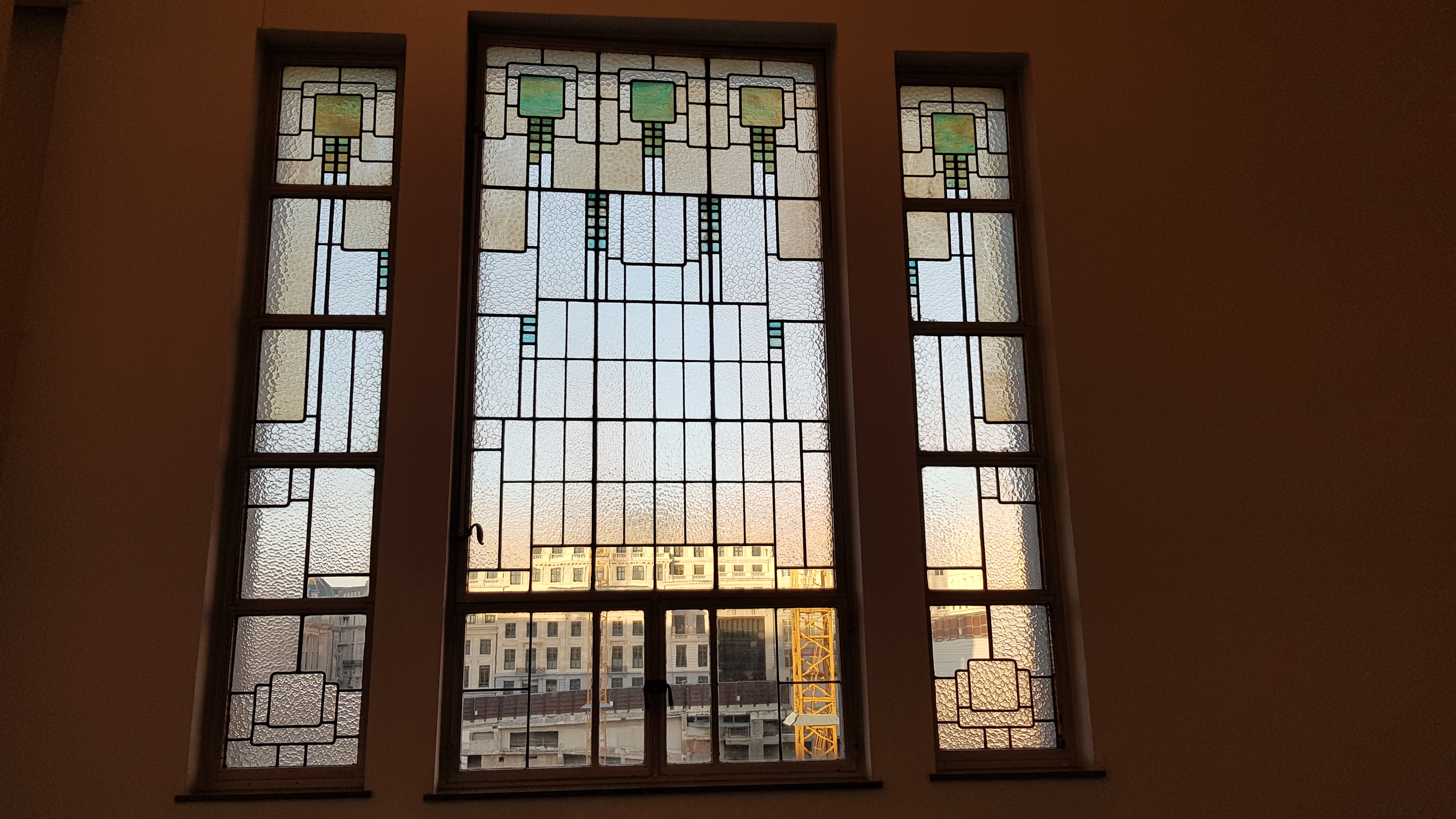
Window

== Directors ==
- Robert, 7th Duke d'Ursel, President of the Centre for Fine Arts
- 1974–1986: Karel Geirlandt, Director-General of exhibitions of the Centre for Fine Arts
- 1998–2021: Etienne Davignon, President of the Centre for Fine Arts
- 2002–2021: Paul Dujardin, Director-General of BOZAR
- 15 October 2021 – 29 May 2022: Sophie Lauwers, Director-General of BOZAR for a brief period of seven months
- 1 February 2023–ongoing: Christophe Slagmuylder, Director-General of BOZAR

== Trivia ==
- 12270 Bozar, discovered on 16 August 1990 by Eric Walter Elst, is named after the centre.

== See also ==
- List of museums in Brussels
- Art Deco in Brussels
- History of Brussels
- Culture of Belgium
