= Françoise Nyssen =

French-Belgian publisher and politician

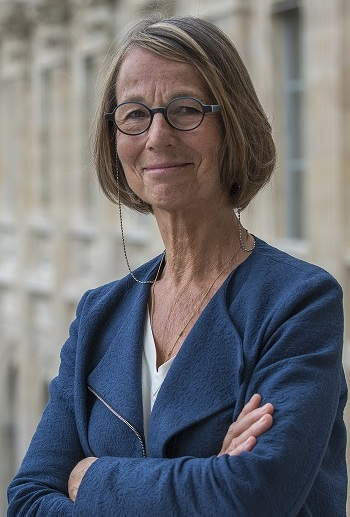

Minister of Culture
- In office 17 May 2017 – 16 October 2018
- Prime Minister: Édouard Philippe
- Preceded by: Audrey Azoulay
- Succeeded by: Franck Riester

Personal details
- Born: 9 June 1951 (age 75) Etterbeek, Belgium
- Parent(s): Hubert Nyssen; Christine Le Bœuf
- Education: Université libre de Bruxelles

Françoise Nyssen (French pronunciation: [fʁɑ̃swaz nisɛn]; born 9 June 1951) is a French-Belgian publisher and politician and a former director of the Actes Sud publishing house. From 2017 until 2018, she served as Minister of Culture of France in the government of Prime Minister Édouard Philippe.

== Early life and education ==
Françoise Nyssen was raised and attended university in Belgium. She has a maîtrise (Master's degree) from the Institut supérieur d’urbanisme et de rénovation urbaine in Brussels.

== Career ==
Early in her career, Nyssen worked first as an urban planner in Paris.

In 1987, Nyssen became an associate and presiding director of Actes Sud publisher, founded by her father Hubert Nyssen, and located in Arles. Françoise Nyssen and her husband founded the school Domaine du possible in 2014, using Steiner-Waldorf paedagogical methods. The school settled in a farm a few kilometers away from the centre of Arles, where a hundred pupils, aged from 3 to 16, were enrolled in September 2016.

On 17 May 2017, Nyssen was appointed French Minister of Culture, as the successor of Audrey Azoulay. On 13 November 2017, she announced the launch of a new fund to support young designers with €300,000 to be invested in 10 projects annually.

During her time in office, Nyssen was accused of impropriety over renovations done in her previous publishing house’s outpost in Arles in 2011. Shortly after, the public prosecutor’s office in Paris launched a preliminary investigation into Nyssen, after French weekly Le Canard Enchaîné reported that she had failed to declare building renovations in her prior career as a publisher. In October 2018, she was replaced by Franck Riester in a cabinet reshuffle.

== Other activities ==
=== Corporate boards ===
- EuropaCorp, Independent Member of the Board of Directors (2012-2017)
- Société Marseillaise de Crédit (SMC), Member of the Supervisory Board

=== Non-profit organizations ===
- Rencontres d'Arles, Member of the Board of Directors (-2017)
