= The Sermon on the Fall of Rome =

2012 novel by Jérôme Ferrari

- English edition
- Author: Jérôme Ferrari
- Original title: Le Sermon sur la chute de Rome
- Translator: Geoffrey Strachan
- Language: French
- Publisher: Actes Sud
- Publication date: 2012
- Publication place: France
- English publication date: 2014
- ISBN: 9780857052902

The Sermon on the Fall of Rome (French: Le Sermon sur la chute de Rome) is a novel by the French writer Jérôme Ferrari, published in 2012. The book received the Prix Goncourt in 2012. It was translated to English from the original French by Geoffrey Strachan.

== Summary ==
The story begins with the manager of a village absconding, leaving behind a number of quarrelling would-be successors. As the story progresses, all of them fall prey to accusations of adultery and insolvency. The situation seems hopeless until Matthieu and Libero, natives of the village, rise to meet the challenge of succeeding the missing manager.

Tragically, Matthieu and Libero are led astray by alcohol and women. The story encompasses themes of tragedy, human decadence, absurdity, romance, comedy, and wisdom.

== See also ==
- 2012 in literature
- Contemporary French literature
