= Europalia =

Belgian-based arts festival

EUROPALIA
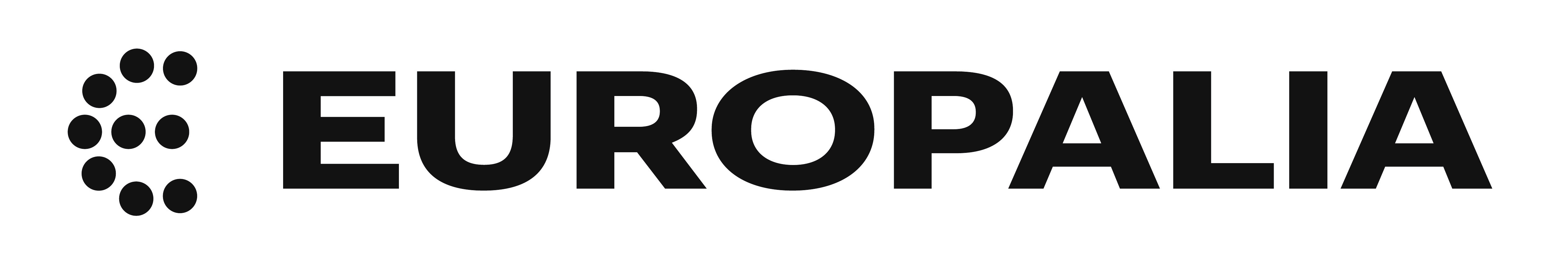

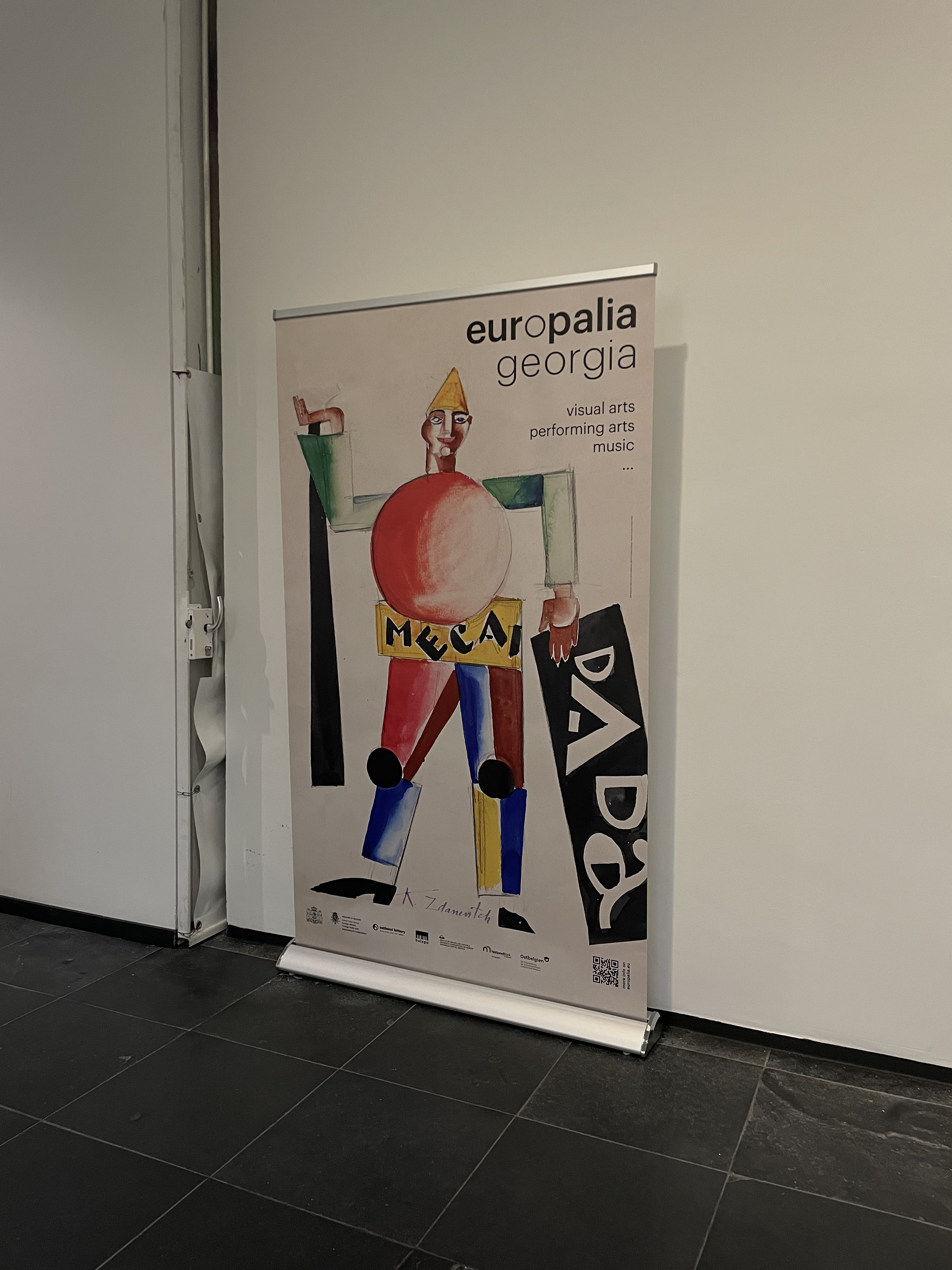
- 2023 europalia georgia festival banner
- Genre: Biennale; focuses on the cultural heritage and art scene of one invited country, and includes visual arts, performing arts, film, music, literature and debate
- Frequency: Biennial
- Locations: Brussels, Belgium
- Inaugurated: 1969
- Website: europalia.eu/en

EUROPALIA (stylized in capital letters since 2025) is a Brussels-based, international biennial arts festival that highlights the cultural heritage and art scene of one invited country. On multiple occasions, the festival has also dedicated editions to a theme rather than a country. EUROPALIA was established with the aim of bringing the arts and culture of European countries to the heart of Europe itself. Although, since 1989 – with Europalia Japan – non-european countries have also featured. The very first festival in 1969 was dedicated to Italy.

The name EUROPALIA is a combination of two words: "Europe" and "Opalia", an ancient Roman harvest festival held in mid-December in honour of Ops, earth-goddess and fertility deity. Her name lies at the root of the Latin word "Opus", that denotes a work of art.

For approximately four months (traditionally starting in October), and in partnership with a wide network of cultural partners (museums, theatre and concert halls and other venues), EUROPALIA presents a series of artistic and socio-cultural projects that bring together visual arts, performing arts, film, music, literature and debate. In recent years, newly commissioned projects and artistic residencies have started occupying a central place in the multidisciplinary programme, which focuses on both the heritage and the contemporary art scene of the invited country.

The opening event takes place in the capital, but the programme also unfolds in other cities across Belgium, such as Liège and Antwerp, among others. Other European cities (in countries such as the Netherlands, France, Luxembourg and Germany) have also hosted europalia events.

The festival expenses are shared between Belgium and the invited country. EUROPALIA is financially supported by Belgium’s national, regional and community governments, among others.

The upcoming festival, starting in October 2025, will be EUROPALIA ESPAÑA.

== History of festivals ==
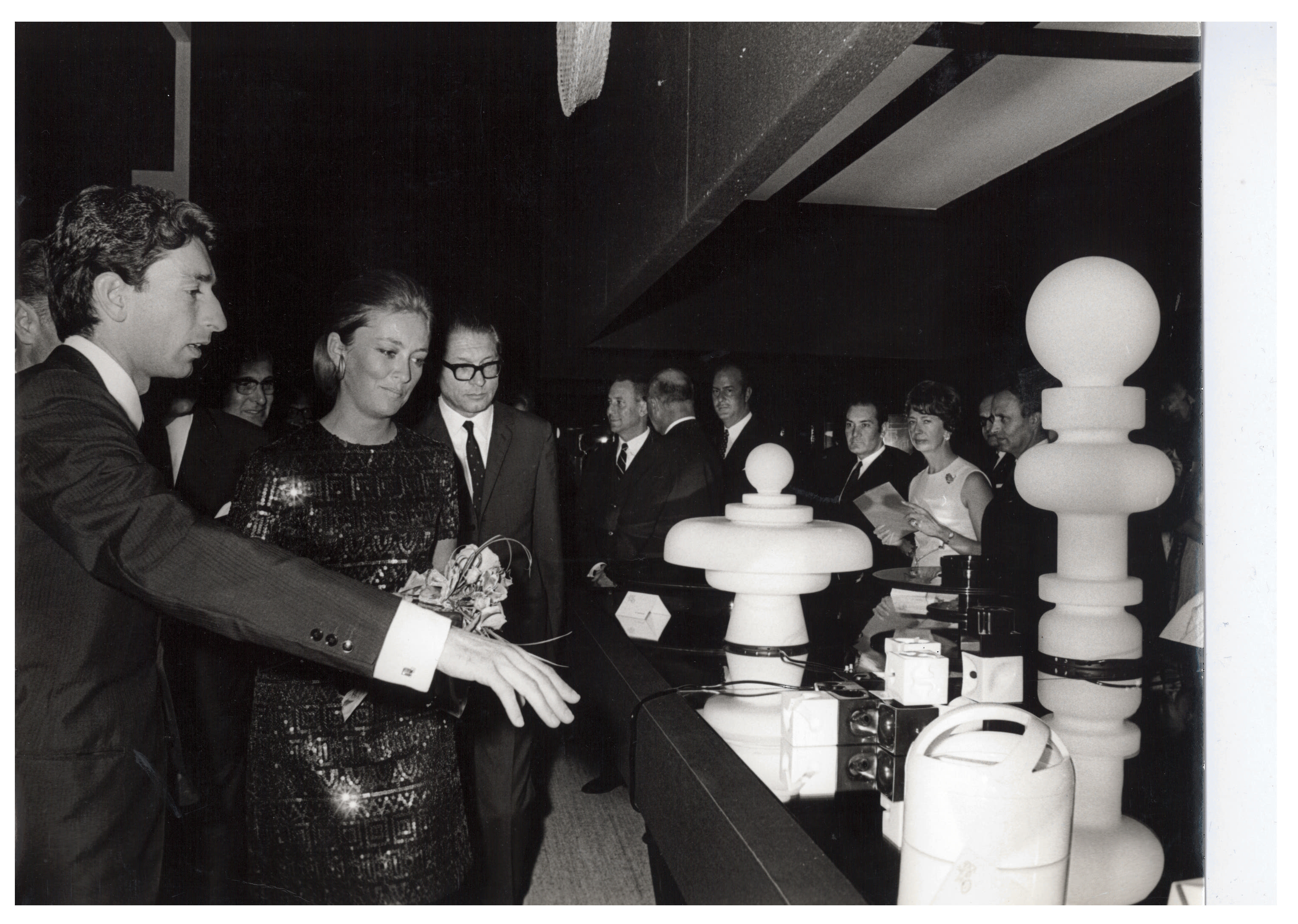
Europalia Italia 1969

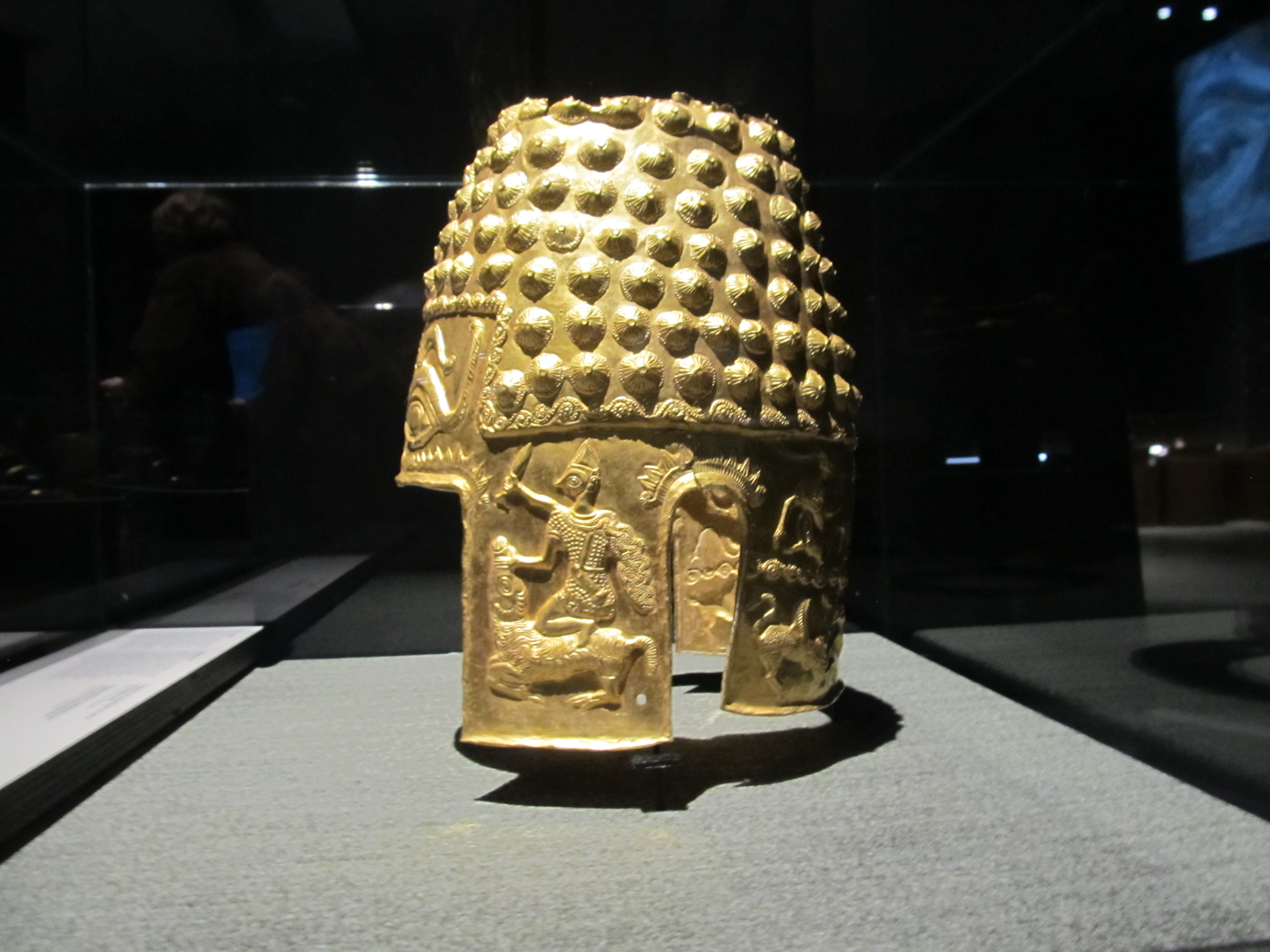
Europalia Romania 2019

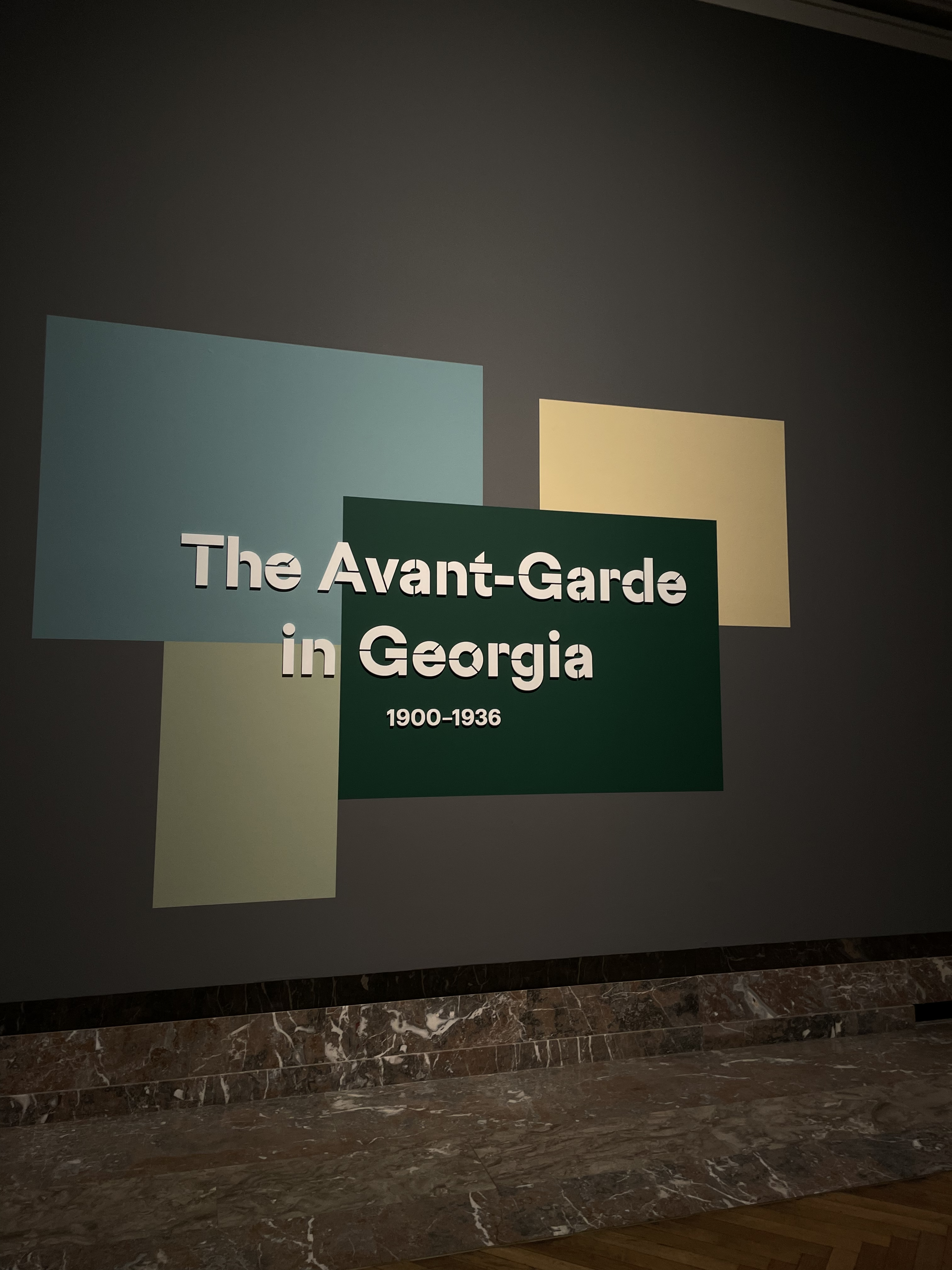
europalia georgia 2023

- 1969 Italy
- 1971 The Netherlands
- 1973 Great Britain
- 1975 France
- 1977 Germany
- 1980 Belgium
- 1982 Greece
- 1985 Spain
- 1987 Austria
- 1989 Japan
- 1991 Portugal
- 1993 Mexico
- 1996 Victor Horta
- 1998 Czech Republic
- 1999 Hungary
- 2000 Brussels
- 2001 Poland
- 2002 Bulgaria
- 2003 Italy
- 2005 Russia
- 2007 EU-27
- 2009 China
- 2011 Brazil
- 2013 India
- 2015 Turkey
- 2017 Indonesia
- 2019 Romania
- 2021 Trains & Tracks
- 2023 Georgia
- 2025 Spain

== Selection of notable events ==
- 1971 – Rembrandt and his Time (exhibition) at Bozar, Brussels (Europalia Netherlands)
- 1973 – David Hockney (exhibition) at Bozar, Brussels (Europalia Great Britain)
- 1980 – Bruegel, a Dynasty of Painters (exhibition) at Bozar, Brussels (Europalia Belgium)
- 2003 – Venus Unveiled (exhibition) at Bozar, Brussels (Europalia Italia) – curator: Umberto Eco
- 2009 – The State of Things (exhibition) at Bozar, Brussels (Europalia China) – curators: Ai Wei Wei and Luc Tuymans
- 2011 – Tropicália (concert) by Tom Zé & Quintet at VIERNULVIER (Ghent), DE SINGEL (Antwerp) and other venues (Europalia Brazil)
- 2017 – Power and Other Things (exhibition) at Bozar, Brussels (Europalia Indonesia)
- 2019 – Brancusi. Sublimation of Form (exhibition) at Bozar, Brussels (Europalia Romania)
- 2021 – La Ronde by Boris Charmatz/Terrain (performance) at Brussels North Station (Europalia Trains & Tracks)
- 2023 – Georgian Polyphony: Triple Bill Basiani Ensemble, Gori Women’s Choir & Georgian State Chamber Choir (concert) at Concertgebouw (Bruges) and other venues (Europalia Georgia)

== General and Artistic Directors ==
- 1985 – 1993 Martine Baudin, General Director
- 1993 – 1996 Paul Vandenbussche, General Director
- 1996 – 2005 Luc Stainier, General Director
- 2005 – 2017 Kristine De Mulder, General Director
- 2014 – present Dirk Vermaelen, Artistic Director
- 2017 – 2023 Koen Clement, General Director
- 2023 – present Christian Salez, General Director

== See also ==
- European Capital of Culture

== Sources ==
- Europalia
- Tourism In Europe
