= Paul Beauchamp =

French Jesuit and theologian

Paul Beauchamp (28 July 1924 – 23 April 2001) was a French Jesuit, theologian, exegete, and a specialist in Sacred Scripture and biblical theology.

== Biography ==
Born in 1924 in Tours, in 1941 he entered the novitiate of the Society of Jesus in Laval. In 1948 he left for China, where he remained until 1951. Throughout his life, he maintained a great sensitivity to this country, as shown by a number of publications.

He was ordained as a priest in 1954, and then spent time at the Institut Biblique in Jerusalem, before travelling on to Rome. A doctor in biblical exegesis, his teaching career was divided between the Jesuit Faculty of Theology at Fourvière and the Centre Sèvres in Paris, where he trained generations of students. He died on 23 April 2001.

== Publications ==
His books include;

- "Creation and Separation’’ (1969)
- "Psaumes nuit et jour" (Seuil, Paris 1980)
- "Parler d'Écritures saintes" (Seuil, Paris 1987)
- "The Story, the Letter and the Body’’ (1992)
- "From one mountain to another, the Law of God" (Seuil, Paris 1999)
- "Fifty Biblical Portraits" (Seuil, Paris 2000)
- "The One and the Other Testament" (1977)
