= Jérôme Ferrari =

French writer and translator (born 1968)

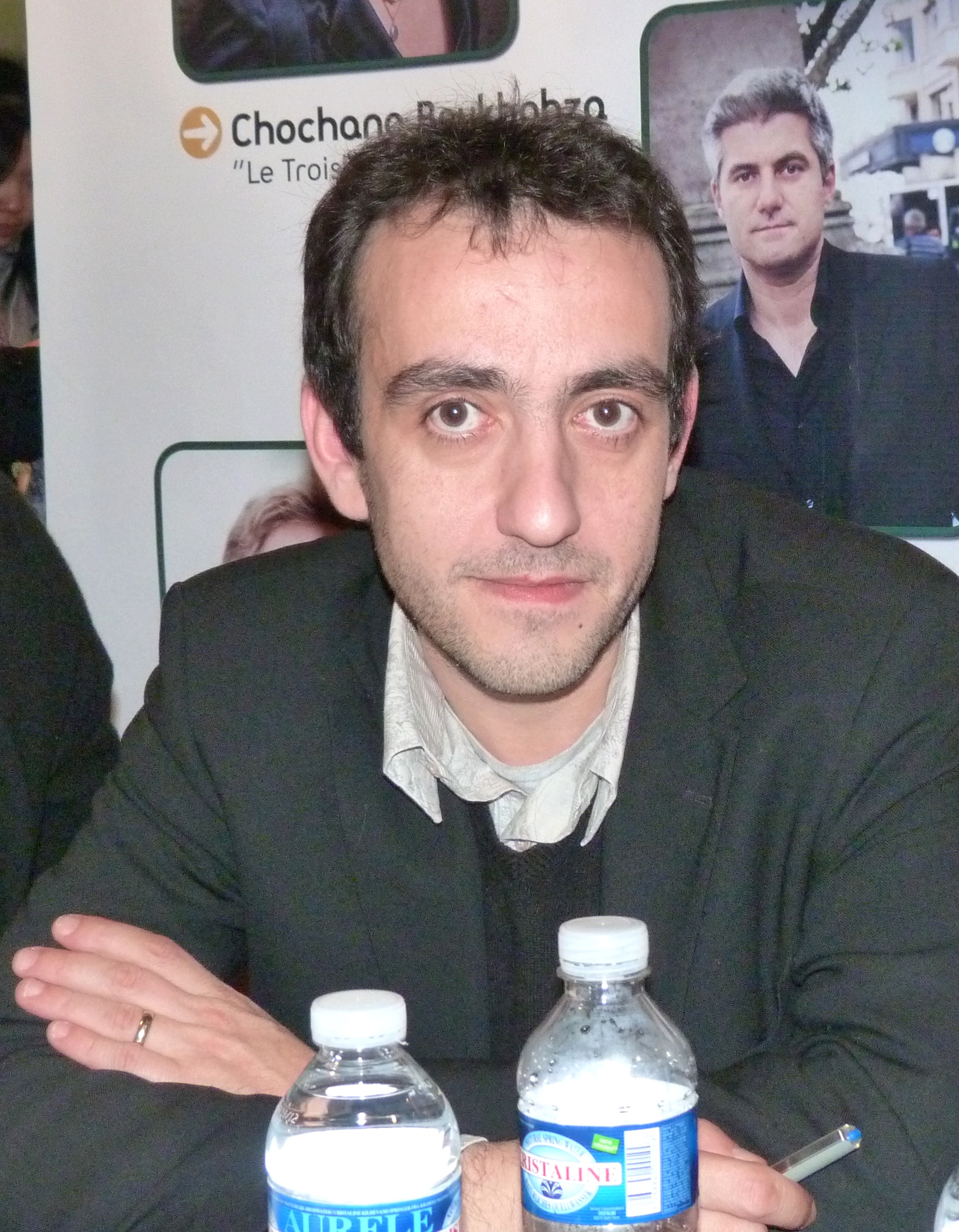
Jérôme Ferrari, 2010

Jérôme Ferrari (born 1968 in Paris) is a French writer and translator. He won the 2012 Prix Goncourt for his novel Le Sermon sur la chute de Rome (The Sermon on the Fall of Rome).

Ferrari has lived in Corsica and taught philosophy at the Lycée international Alexandre-Dumas in Algiers for several years, then at the Lycée Fesch of Ajaccio.

He was a professor of philosophy at the French School of Abu Dhabi until 2015.

Several of his novels have been translated into English, including Where I Left My Soul (2012), which is "set in the mid-1950s during the Algerian war, looking backwards to the second world war and the French defeat in Indochina, and forwards to the collapse in 1958 of the Fourth Republic."

Most recently, his novel In His Own Image was published in English translation by Europa Editions.

== Works ==
- 2002 Aleph zéro
- 2007 Dans le secret
- 2008 Balco Atlantico (English translation: Balco Atlantico, 2019)
- 2009 Un dieu un animal
- 2012 Le Sermon sur la chute de Rome (English translation: The Sermon on the Fall of Rome, 2014)
- 2010 Où j'ai laissé mon âme (English translation: Where I Left My Soul, 2012)
- 2015 Le Principe (English translation: The Principle, tr. Howard Curtis, Europa Editions, 2017

)

- 2018 A son image (English translation: In His Own Image, 2022)

== Awards and honors ==
- 2009 Prix Landerneau, Un dieu un animal
- 2010 Grand Prix Poncetton, Où j'ai laissé mon âme
- 2010 Prix Roman France Télévisions, Où j'ai laissé mon âme
- 2012 Prix Goncourt, Le Sermon sur la chute de Rome
