= The Scortas' Sun =

2004 novel by Laurent Gaudé

- First edition (French)
- Author: Laurent Gaudé
- Original title: Le Soleil des Scorta
- Language: French
- Publisher: Actes Sud
- Publication date: 1 August 2004
- Publication place: France
- English publication date: 2006
- Pages: 246
- ISBN: 2-7427-5141-6

The Scortas' Sun (French: Le Soleil des Scorta) is a novel by the French writer Laurent Gaudé. It is also known as The House of Scorta. It received the Prix Goncourt.

== See also ==
- 2004 in literature
- Contemporary French literature
