= CBR Building =

Functionalist building in Brussels, Belgium

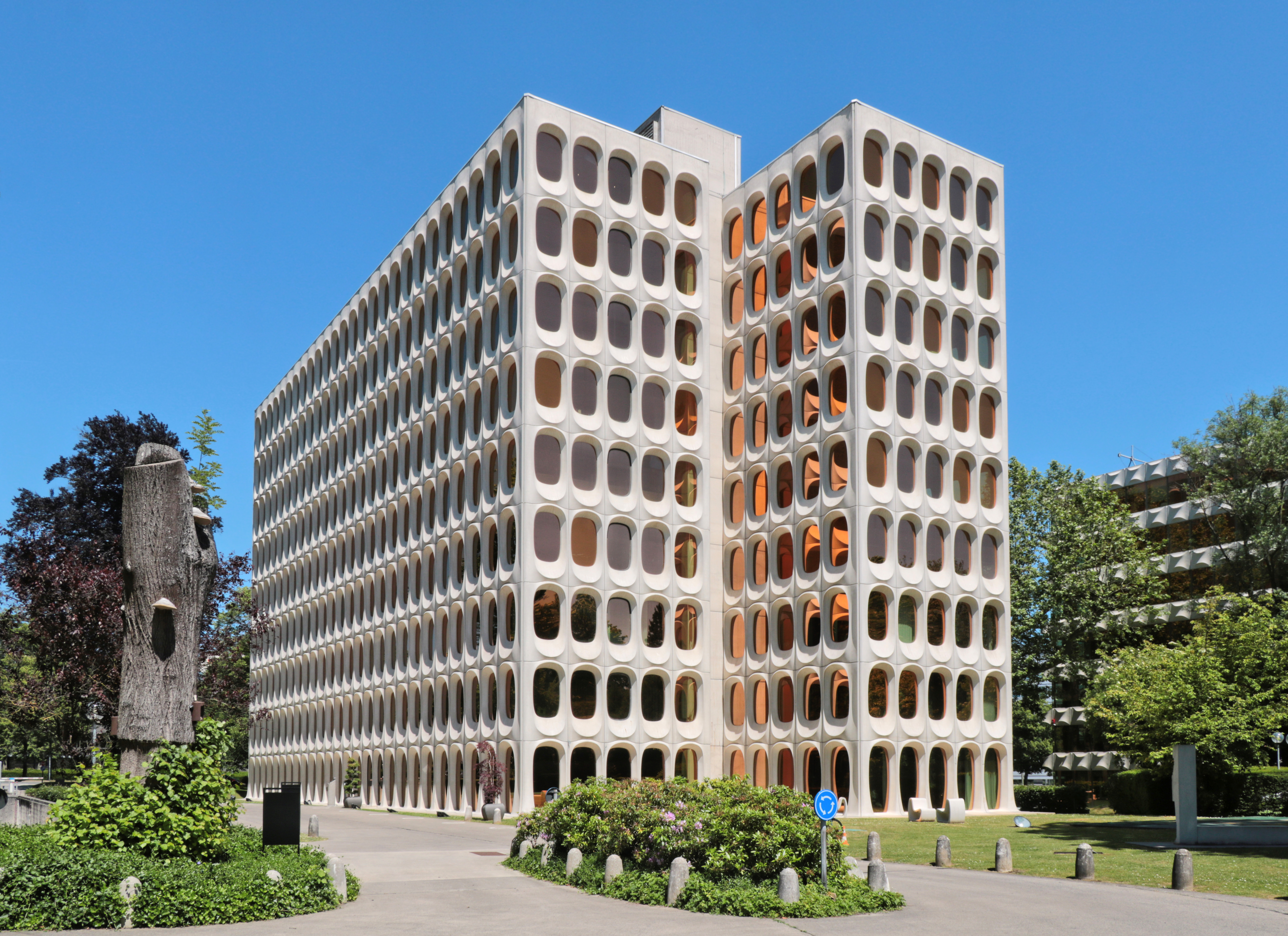
- Rear view of the CBR Building
- Interactive map of the CBR Building area

General information
- Architectural style: New Brutalism
- Location: Chaussée de la Hulpe / Terhulpensesteenweg 185, 1170 Watermael-Boitsfort, Brussels-Capital Region, Belgium
- Coordinates: 50°47′43″N 4°24′19″E
- Construction started: 1967
- Completed: 1970
- Renovated: 2018

Design and construction
- Architects: Constantin Brodzki, Marcel Lambrichs

The CBR Building is a functionalist office building situated in Watermael-Boitsfort, a municipality of Brussels, Belgium. Designed by the architects Constantin Brodzki and Marcel Lambrichs and built between 1967 and 1970, its prefabricated modular façade showcases white concrete instead of hiding it as a construction material, classifying the building as a New Brutalist piece of architecture. In November 2018, it was added to the list of protected heritage within the Brussels-Capital Region.

== Description ==
=== Architecture ===
The building is made up of two parallel wings attached to each other but slightly offset. With a height of 31.46 metres (103.2 ft), it has nine floors above ground and three underground floors. Designed to highlight the qualities of the material produced by Belgian cement works, its façade is made up of an assembly of 756 prefabricated oval modules in molded white cement concrete. The western façade has twenty-six bays of nine floors. There are no window frames and the panes, tinted orange, are set directly in the concrete which, during construction, involved the installation of a complete air conditioning system, the first of its kind in Belgium.

Constantin Brodzki saw the potential of using concrete as more than just a construction material and wanted to exploit its formal freedom to create organic shapes. It took him years, in cooperation with the CBR company and two Portuguese brothers, to be able to craft the prefabricated modules used in the façade. They started by producing dozens of different testing models which, once perfected, were used to create a mould in epoxy. This mould was used to produce the 756 modules needed, after which the construction was completed very quickly. This method of construction allowed the building to be erected as quickly as one floor per week.

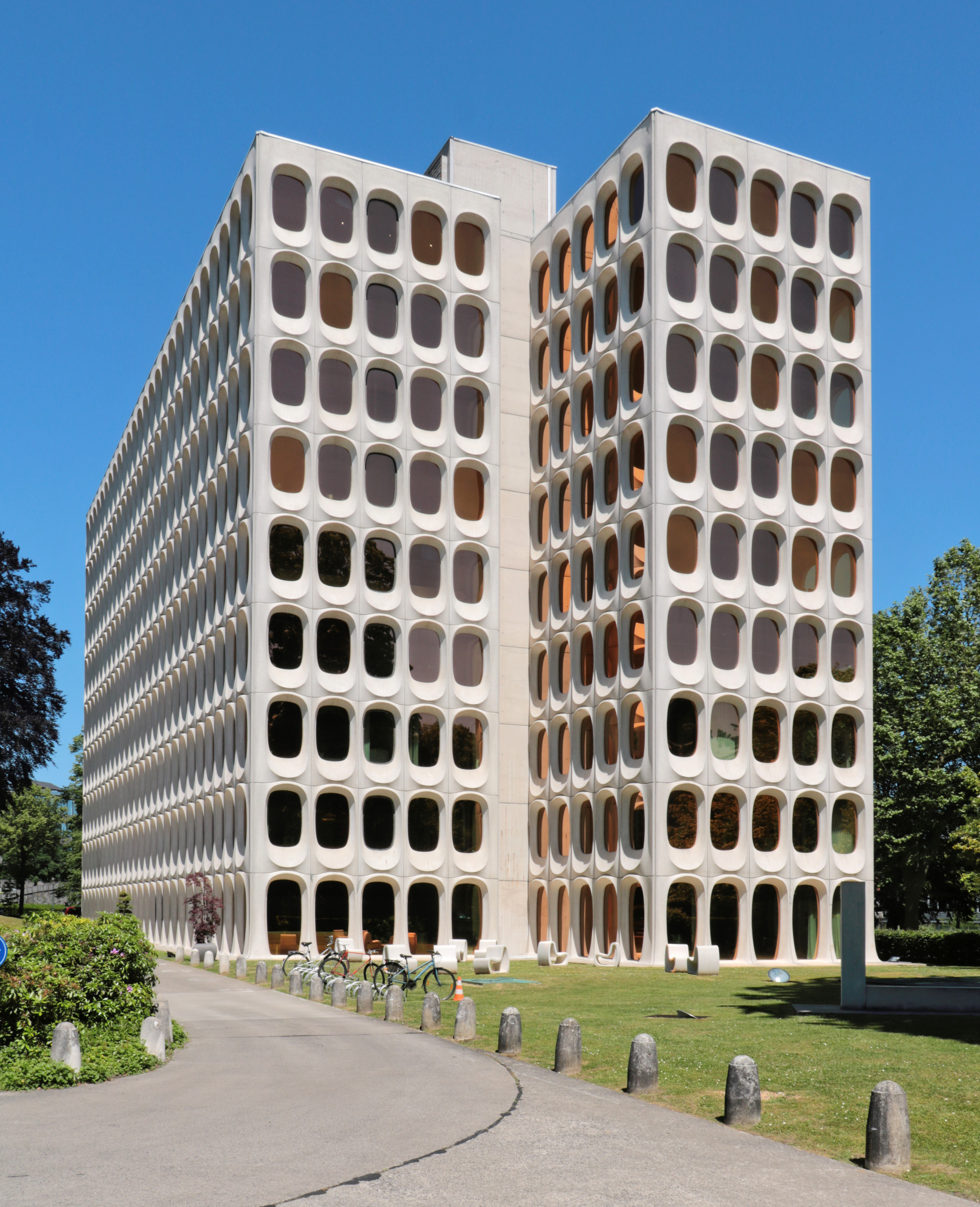
Southern façades

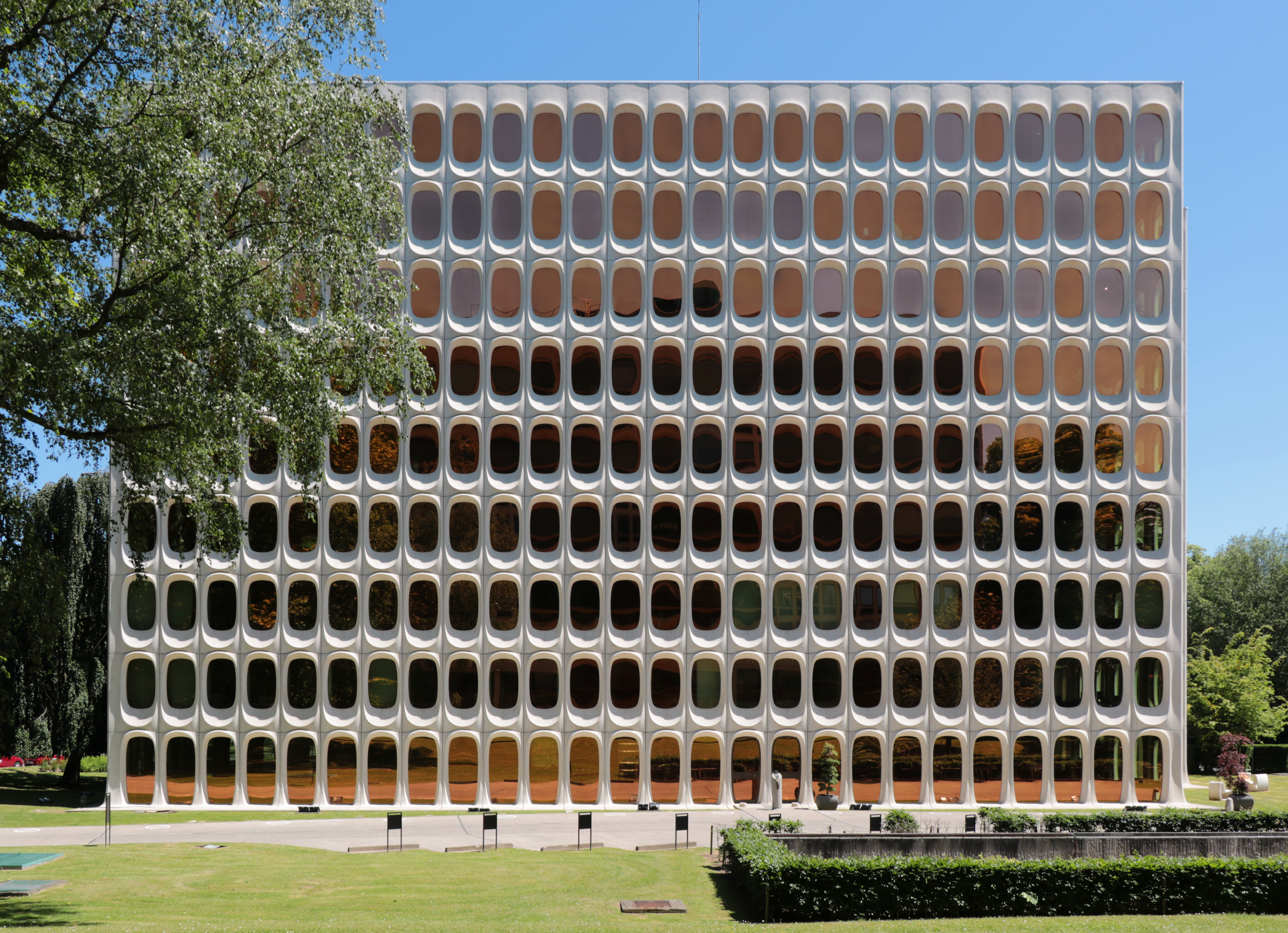
Western façade

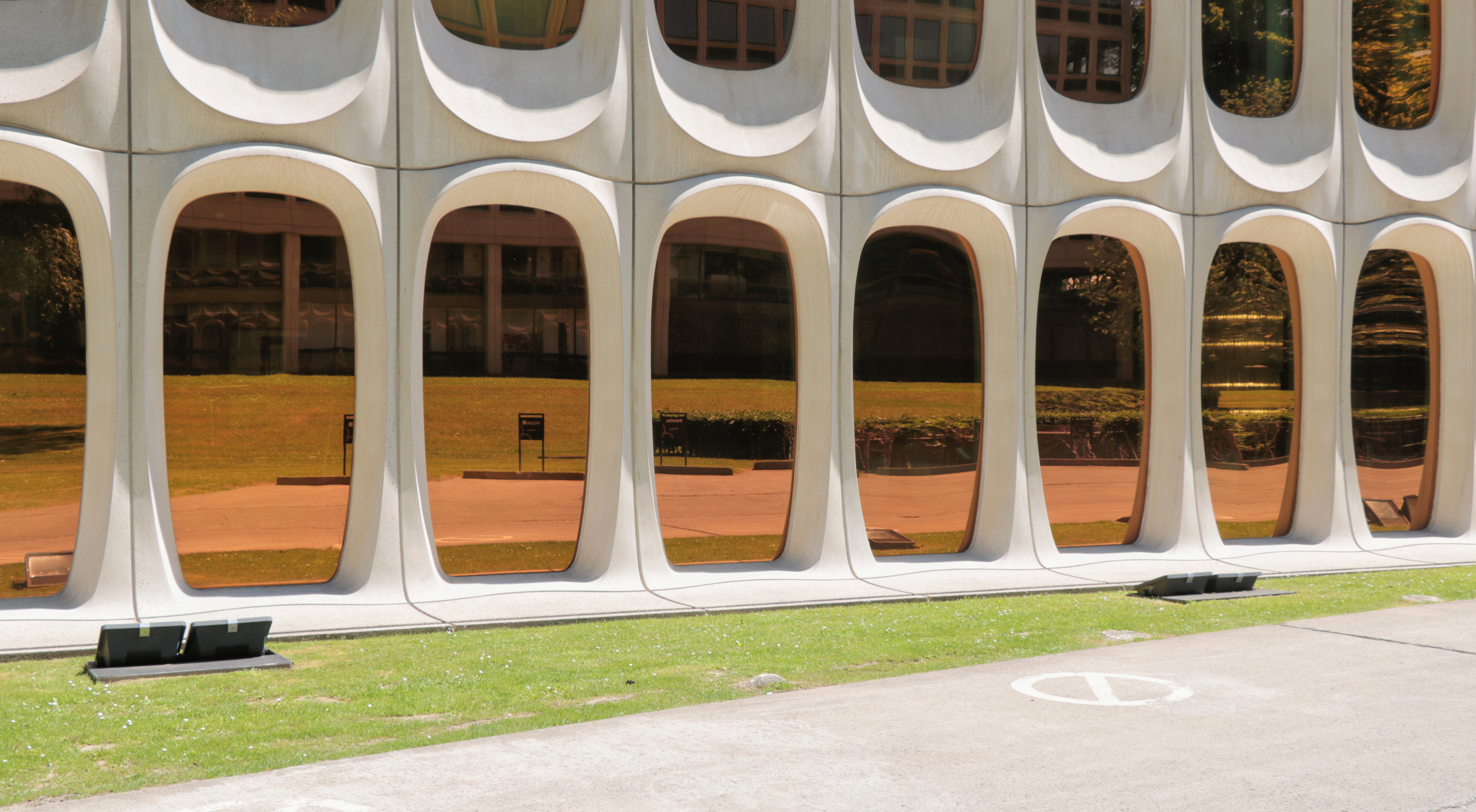
White prefabricated concrete modules

=== Original interior ===
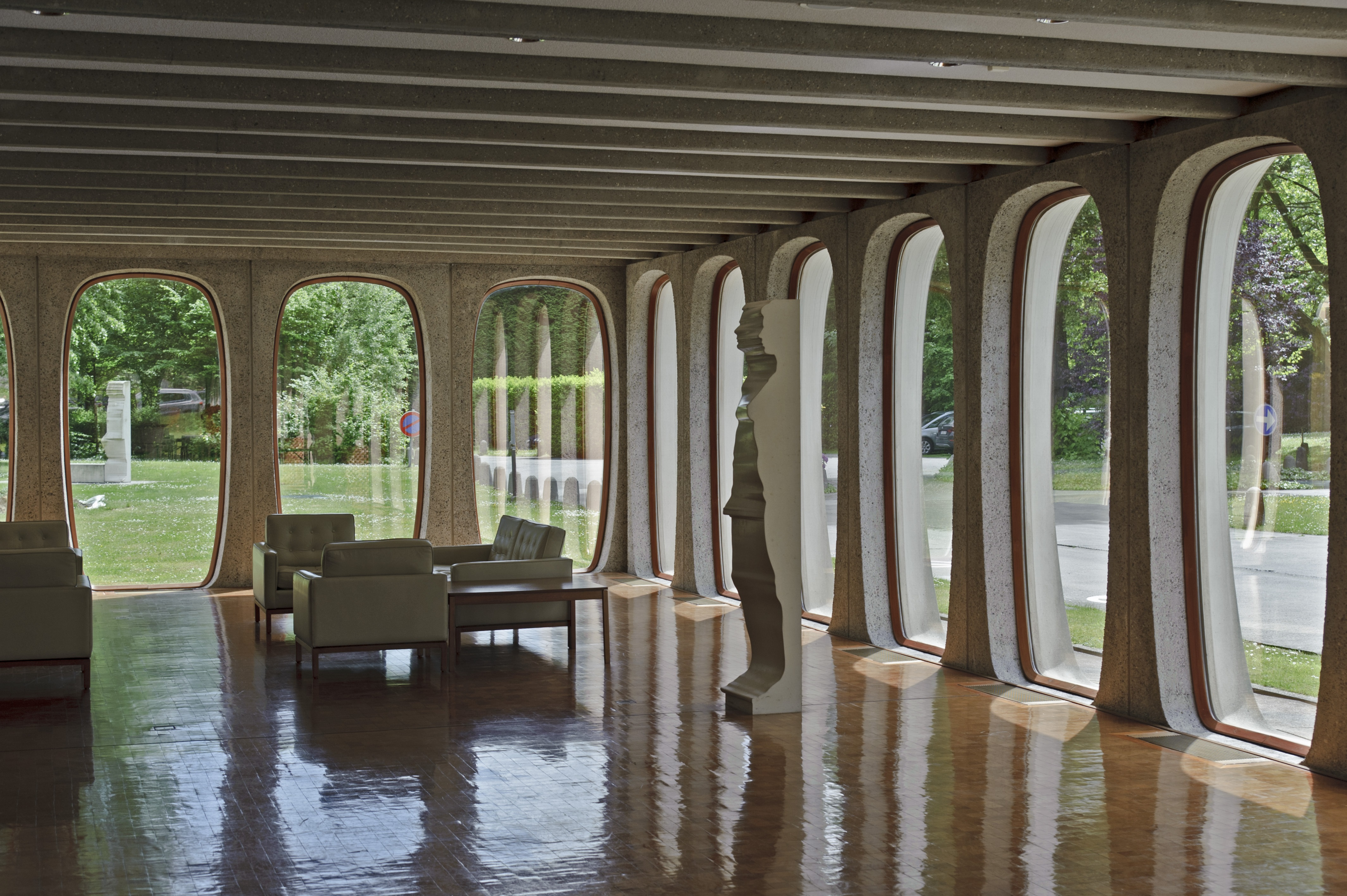
Ground floor before the renovation

The interior features mahogany partitions, parquet floors, bush-hammered concrete details and a concrete spiral staircase from the ground floor to the basement restaurant. The finish is particularly meticulous on the eighth floor "composed of rosewood partition systems, with extremely refined care given, even to the design of the lever handles, door handles, signage, furniture...". Every material, detail and finishing in the building was chosen by the architects themselves, even the buttons on the elevator.

The interior fittings and furniture give the building the "character of a total and complete work". Some of the furniture Brodzki designed himself in collaboration with his friend and neighbour, the interior architect Jules Wabbes, as well as the American designer Florence Knoll.

== Occupation ==
The construction was initiated in 1967 by the CBR cement company, who produce and sell a large variety of cements for construction in Brussels, as they needed new infrastructure for their headquarters. The aim for the building was to showcase their abilities and knowledge in working with concrete.

In 2017, the CBR was forced to move their headquarters, as the building was no longer up to their standards. The building went vacant for a year after which the coworking company Fosbury & Sons, founded by Stijn Geeraerts, Maarten Van Gool and Serge Hannecart, saw their opportunity and occupied the building to create new coworking spaces. Now the building is often used for public lectures and events, as it accommodates a small auditorium, a restaurant, a bar and even a small club.

== Renovation ==
When in 2017 the CBR moved their headquarters, there was concern that the building would be demolished. Twenty-five architects petitioned for its preservation. Rudi Vervoort, Minister-President of the Brussels-Capital Region, responded by initiating the process of adding the CBR Building to the list of protected heritage in Brussels (which protects the building's exterior). Later on, he also assured an optimal preservation of the building during its renovation by Fosbury & Sons.

In 2019, the renovation was complete and Fosbury & Sons occupied the building. The original wooden cabinets were disassembled, renovated and reinstalled; the concrete staircase with its handrail was renovated as well. Most of the other original pieces, such as the built-in units, authentic door handles, radiator caps, and wooden window casings, were preserved. There were also modern additions, which kept in mind the original materials, as to not disrupt the architectural unity.

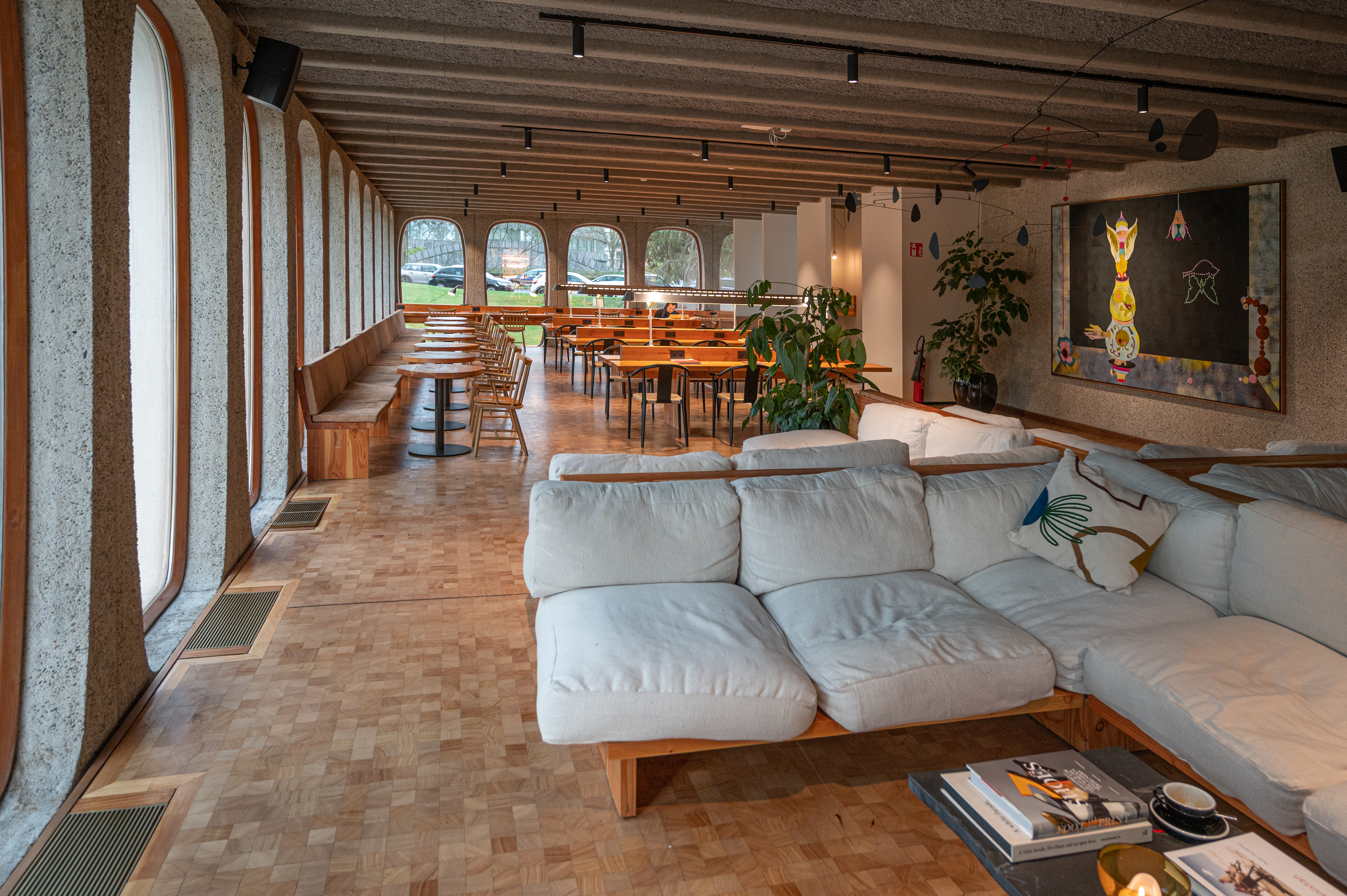
Coworking spaces on the ground floor, right next to the reception

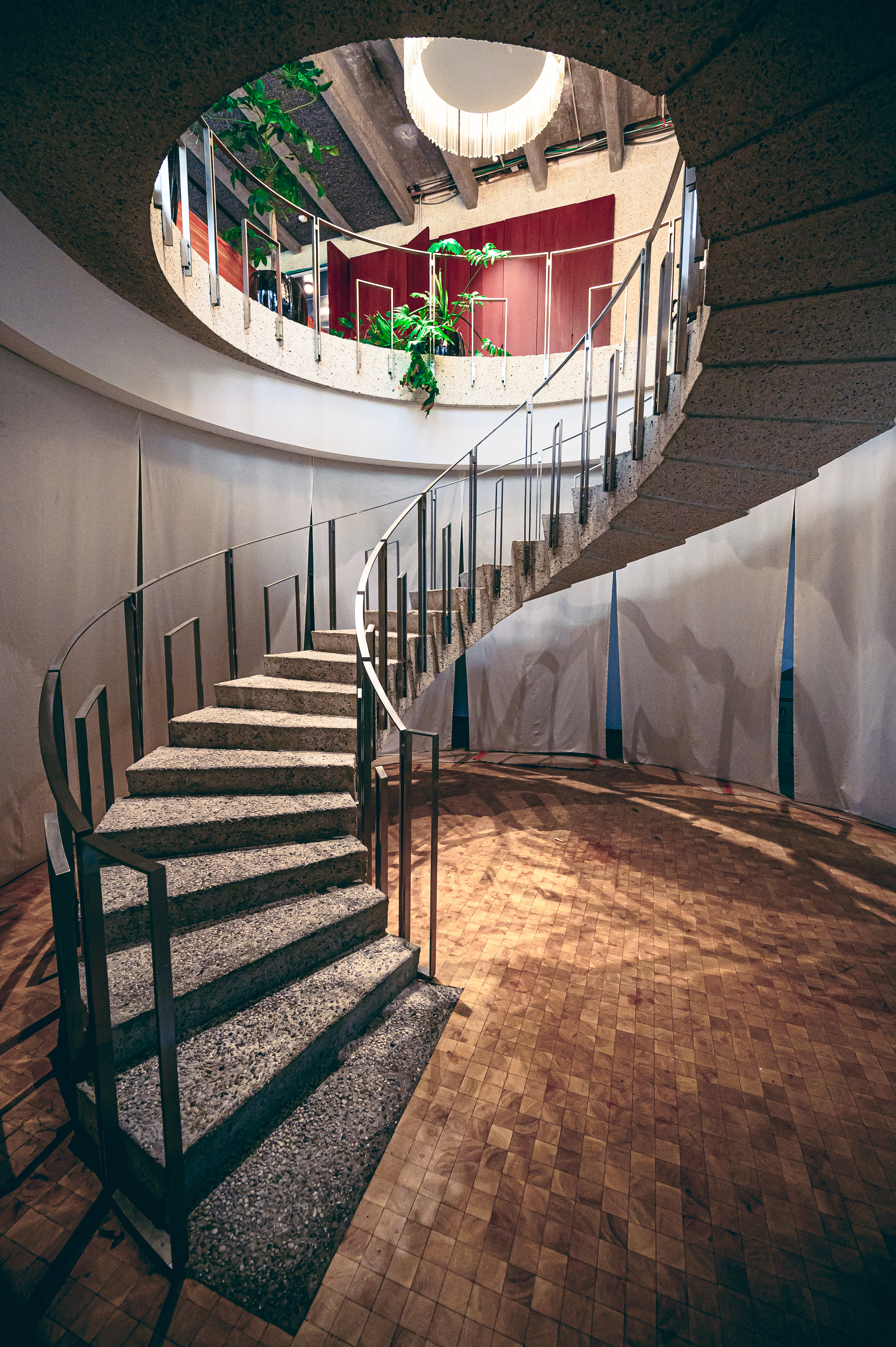
Renovated concrete staircase

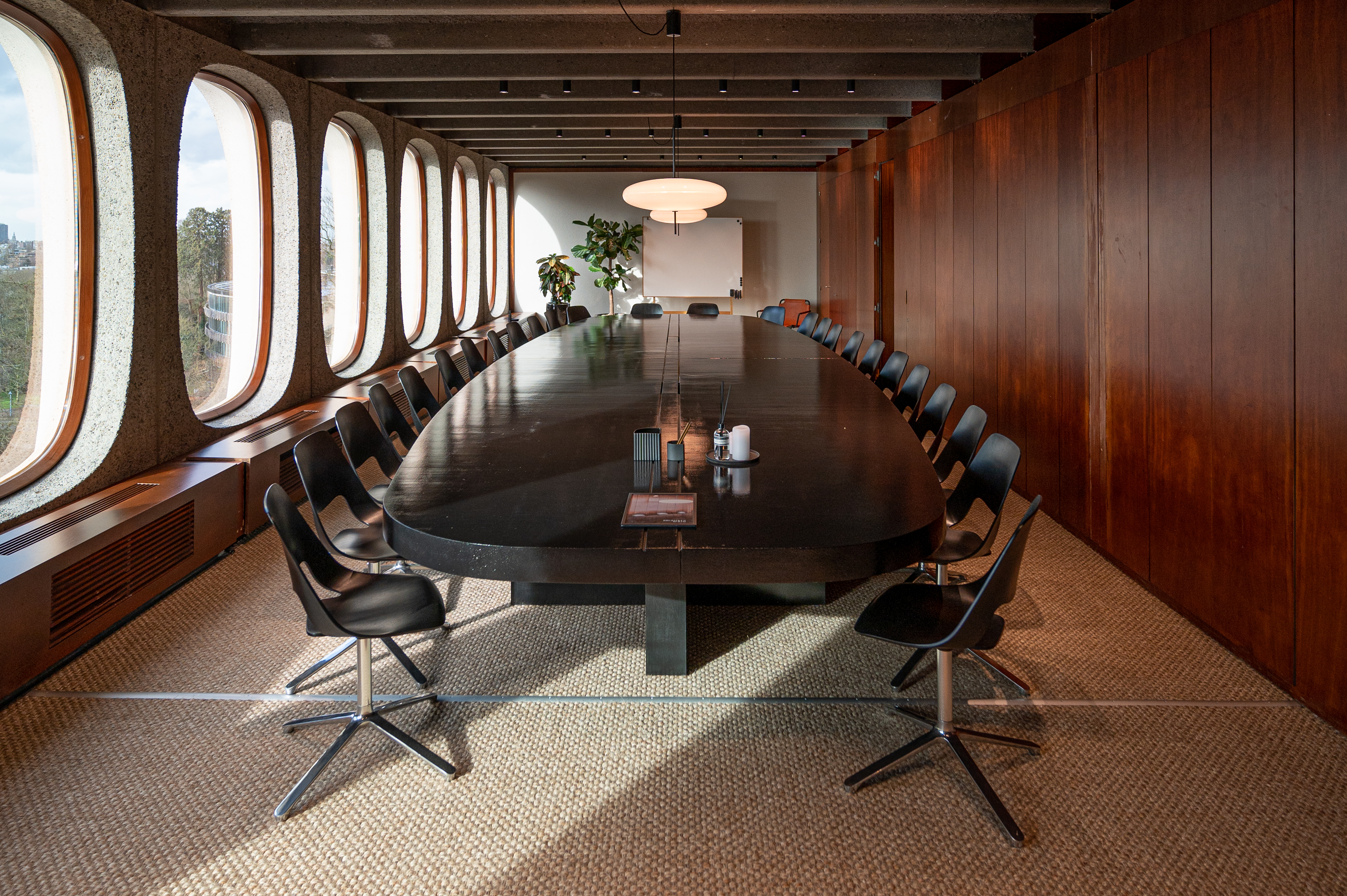
A refurbished meeting room

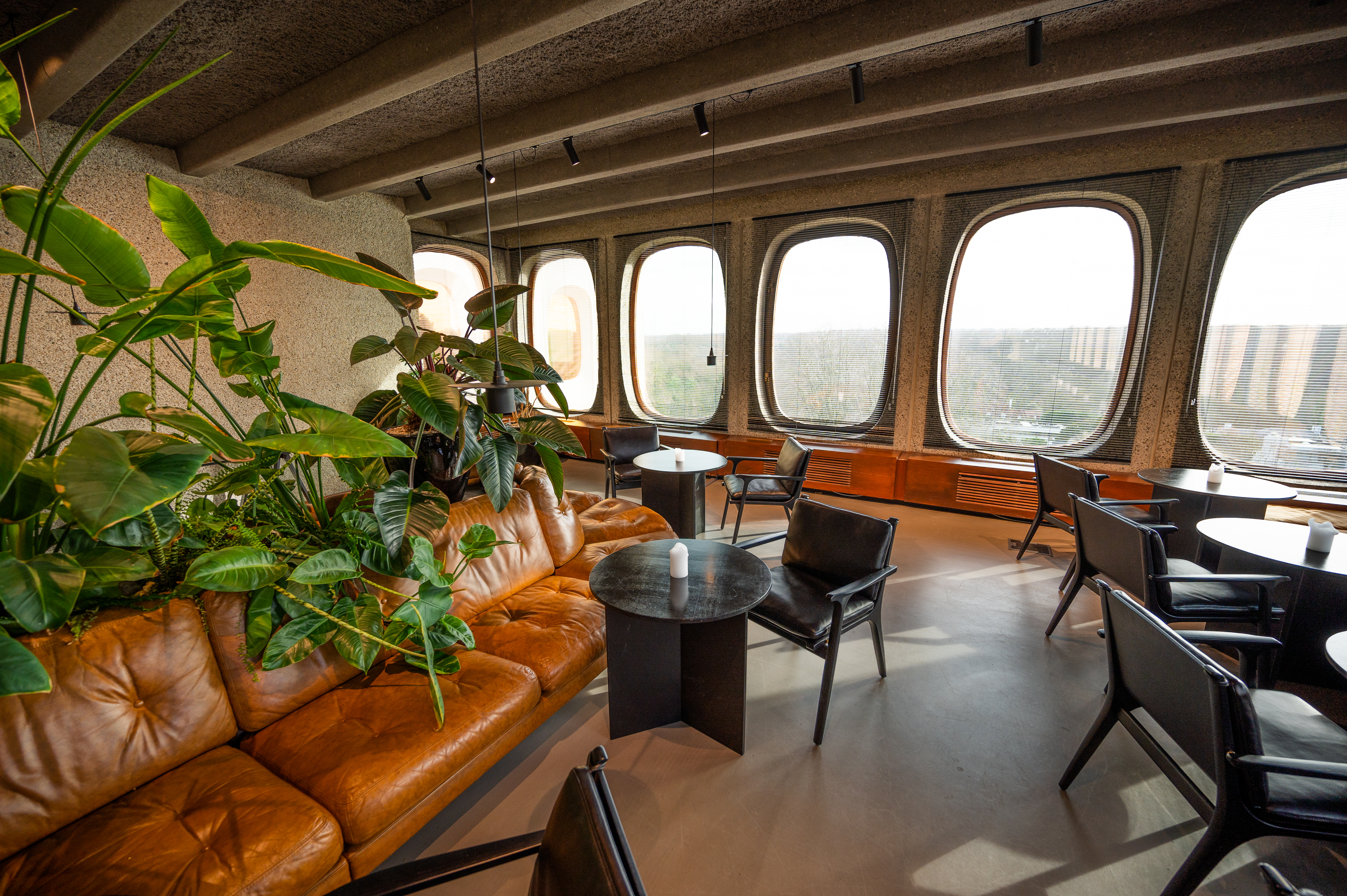
Communal space on the top floor

== Location and surroundings ==
The CBR building is located at 185, Chaussée de la Hulpe/Terhulpensesteenweg in Watermael-Boitsfort, adjacent to the Sonian Forest and ten minutes away from the Avenue Louise/Louizalaan, connecting Brussels' city centre.

The gardens surrounding the building were created by the landscape architect René Pechère. Some of his works include the gardens of the 1958 Brussels World's Fair (Expo 58), the 1937 Paris Expo, the upper part of the Botanical Garden of Brussels, the Mont des Arts/Kunstberg and more. His work is still visible around the building, surrounding it in a vibrant green landscape.

The neighbouring buildings are exclusively dedicated to office-based architecture, strictly distinguished from the residential neighbourhoods closer to the city centre. The office scenery is divided by two large crossing roads, bringing in a constant flow of traffic.

== Publications ==
The CBR building was the only Belgian project selected for the 1979 MoMA exhibition - 'Transformations in Modern Architecture between 1960 and 1980', where it was celebrated for setting a precedent in expressive façades using prefabricated concrete modules.

The building was also mentioned in a publication by the KU Leuven Faculty of Architecture called WTC Tower Teachings, where Marc Dubois described the CBR Building as an example of qualitative real estate architecture within Brussels.

== See also ==
- List of Brutalist structures
