= Shell Building =

Shell Building may refer to:

- Shell Building (Brussels), Belgium
- Shell Building (San Francisco), California
- Shell Building (St Louis), Missouri
- Shell Centre, London, England
- One Shell Square, New Orleans, Louisiana
- One Shell Plaza, Houston, Texas
