= Constantin Brodzki =

Belgian architect (1924–2021)

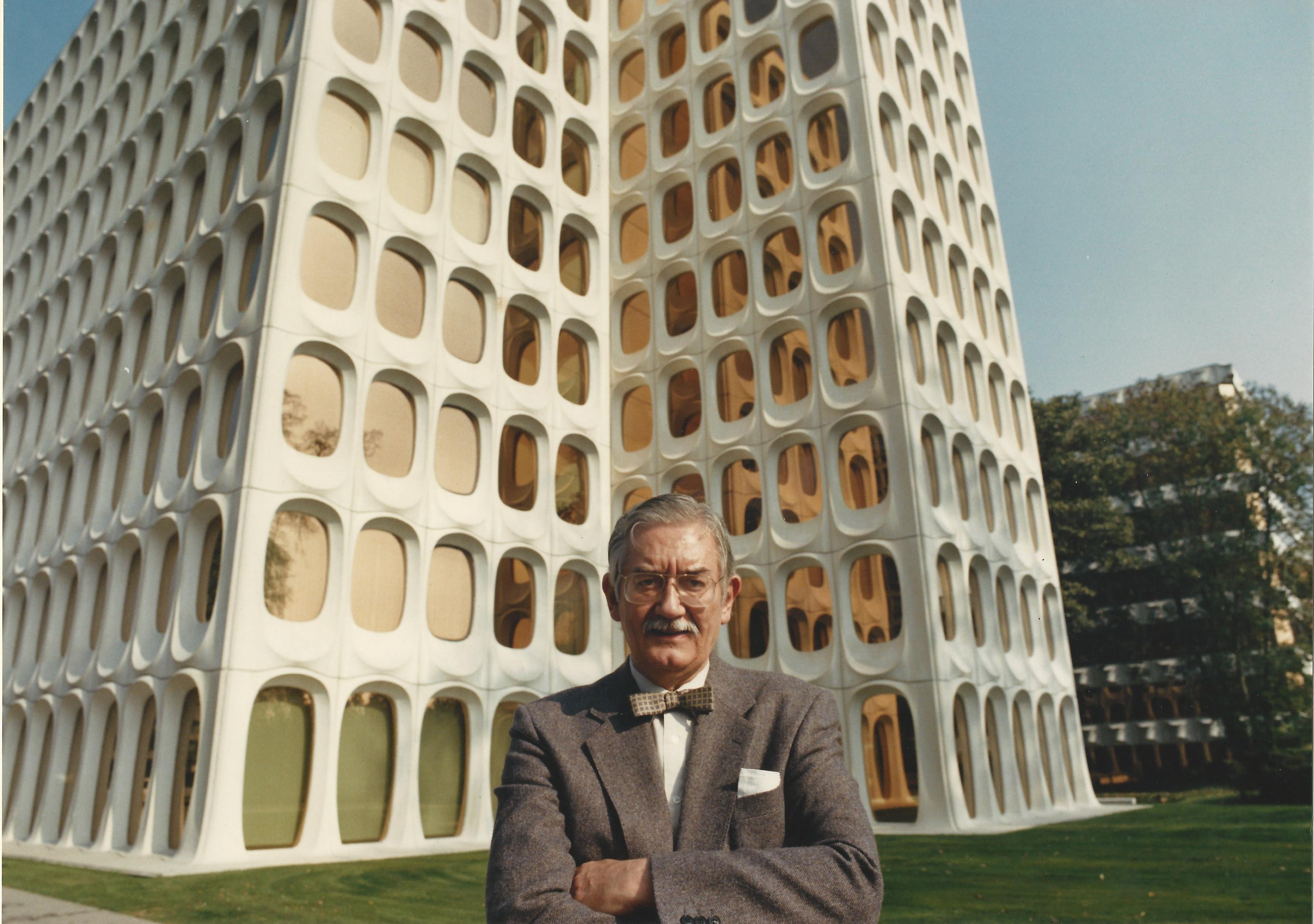
- Born: 26 October 1924; Rome, Kingdom of Italy
- Died: 27 March 2021 (aged 96); Linkebeek
- Education: La Cambre
- Occupation: Architect
- Known for: Brutalist architecture; Prefabricated concrete modules with fluid and organic shapes
- Awards: Baron Horta Prize (2007)

Constantin Brodzki (French pronunciation: [kɔ̃stɑ̃tɛ̃ bʁɔdzki]; 26 October 1924 – 27 March 2021) was an Italian-born, Belgian architect. He is mostly known for his Brutalist architecture and prefabricated modules using concrete in fluid and organic shapes. He was awarded the quinquennial Baron Horta Prize in 2007.

Brodzki was born in Rome and moved to Belgium before World War II. After an internship working with architects involved with building the UN Headquarters in New York City, he moved back to Belgium, where his most notable works, including the CBR Building, were realized. On 28 March 2021 it was reported that Brodzki had died, at the age of 96.

== Early life and education ==
Brodzki was born on 26 October 1924 in Rome, Kingdom of Italy. His father was a Polish diplomat, and his mother was Belgian. He was raised in Italy, Germany, and Poland, and stated that he had known by the time he was seven years old that he wanted to be an architect. He eventually moved to Belgium in 1938, before World War II.

Brodzki began studying at the visual arts school La Cambre in Brussels during the war, and earned a degree there in 1948. He said he did not learn a lot of practical information at La Cambre, and recalled writing poems during his lessons and clashing often with his professor Charles Van Nueten.

== Career ==
=== U.S. Internship ===
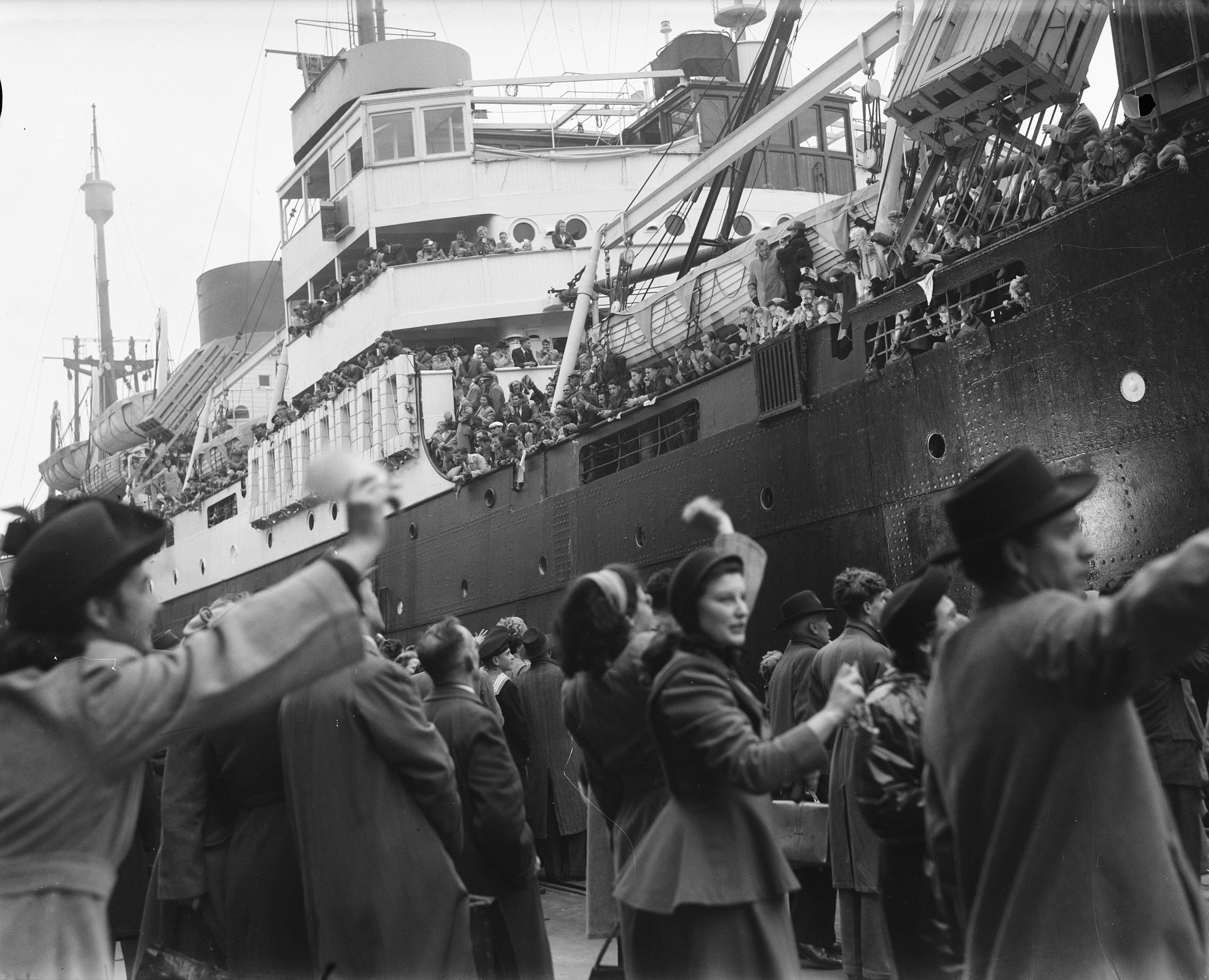
Brodzki travelled to the U.S. in 1948 on an immigrant ship like this one, Tabinta, pictured also in 1948.

After graduating from La Cambre, Brodzki travelled by ship to the United States. During the ten-day journey, he realized that he might be able to participate in the building of the new UN Headquarters in Manhattan because his Belgian mother was friends with a former secretary of the Embassy of Belgium in Warsaw who had become the chief of staff for Belgian Paul-Henri Spaak, then-president of the United Nations General Assembly. Through that connection, his Polish diplomat father was able to contact Spaak's chief of staff and arrange an internship for Brodzki at Harrison & Abramovitz, the U.S. architectural firm tasked with implementing Oscar Niemeyer's design.

The firm had an office with about 500 people, and Brodzki was allowed to wander around, observe what interested him, and ask the specialists what they were doing. His skills in English were lacking at the time, but luckily, one of the leaders was a Polish speaker who helped him understand what was going on. In this manner, he was able to learn about the different stages of design and construction from architects, engineers, drafters, and model makers. As an intern, he was also given some lighter tasks to complete. Brodzki recalls that his experience "[w]orking on what, at the time, was the most modern building in the world ... was heaven", and that he was a "sponge" for six months soaking up all the knowledge.

Brodzki credited the pragmatic way of working that he learned during his internship in the U.S. with his later success in Belgium, explaining that while Belgians tended to "start work assuming they know it all", in contrast, in the U.S., "when they start to work on something, they begin with the idea that they don't know everything, but want to find out". As a result, he learned how to meticulously plan each stage of the building beforehand, conducting multiple studies before construction even began, in order to better focus his efforts.

=== Return to Belgium ===
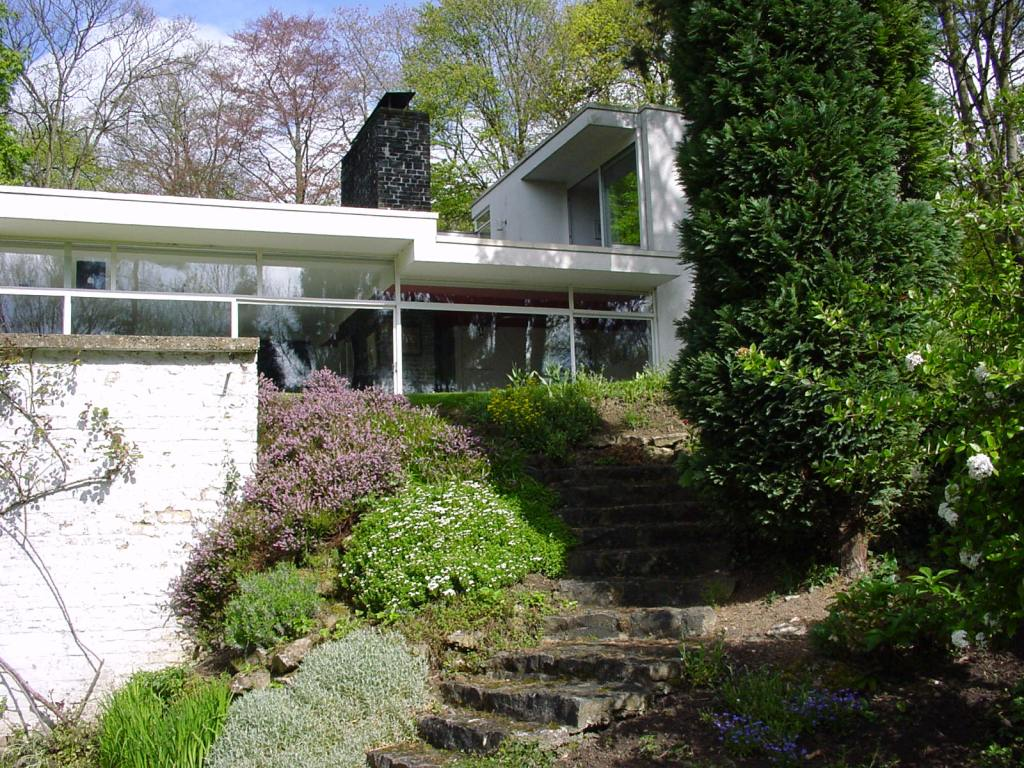
Maison Bandin, built in 1957 in Uccle, Brussels, near Linkebeek, seen in 2000

Brodzki returned to Belgium after his internship, but found himself at odds with the state of the industry once he returned. He recalled feeling "15 years ahead of Belgium in terms of design and methodology" and stated that he had to wait for 10 years before the Belgian industry caught up.

In 1958, Brodzki was selected, along with fellow architect Corneille Hannoset, to construct the Colonial Fauna Pavilion in the Belgian Congo and Ruanda-Urundi Section of Expo 58 in Brussels. (Note: At the time, the Democratic Republic of the Congo was considered a part of Belgium, and it did not gain its independence until 1960. Similarly, Rwanda and Burundi were under Belgian control at the time until they became independent in 1962.) Brodzki reasoned that since no straight lines were found in nature, he did not see why he should design a pavilion with straight lines for the expo. He had never understood the modernist tendency to solely use concrete as structural material to be cast into straight lines and shapes, as he felt that because concrete is a liquid in its original state, it had a lot untapped potential in the forms that it could take. Brodzki saw the Expo 58 project as an opportunity to showcase his thoughts, and he eventually designed a round concrete building with a dome of about 30 m (100 ft) and curves throughout the interior. His building ended up being one of the most visited pavilions in the section.

In 1961, he collaborated again with Hannoset on the Film Museum of the Royal Belgian Film Archive, established by Jacques Ledoux in the Centre for Fine Arts. The Museum initially featured a small auditorium with a hundred seats and was later expanded to include exhibition spaces on the prehistory of cinema and a silent film theatre.

=== CBR Building ===
One of Brodzki's first clients, a lawyer named Bandin, connected him with René Célis, a close contact of the director of Cimenteries Belges Réunies (CBR), a Belgian cement firm . Coincidentally, Brodzki and Célis shared similar opinions in many areas, and they became friends quickly. Both Brodzki and CBR were still establishing themselves at the time, and due to Célis's complete confidence in Brodzki, he was given full control over the project of building a new headquarters for CBR.

Because CBR was a cement firm, Brodzki had access to a cement factory to experiment with his ideas, and a yard where he was able to construct test buildings. Brodzki stated that, with this much freedom, he was able to develop a complete methodology of creating organically shaped prefabricated concrete modules. After working with two Portuguese brothers that were experts with plaster and eventually developing what he felt was the perfect shape for the building, Brodzki had an epoxy mold made and 756 concrete modules prefabricated. Soon, the building was growing at a rate of about a floor a week, which was an unprecedented rate at the time.

As he had worked on virtually everything in the building, including such small details as the elevator buttons, Brodzki had a strong emotional attachment to the building. Upon completion of the project, the CEO even asked Brodzki if he would like to choose a frame for the family photo on his desk. Decades later, when an investment group purchased the building, Brodzki was worried about what would become of it, as the same group had previously purchased a building he had designed for the Society for Worldwide Interbank Financial Telecommunication (SWIFT), and Brodzki had felt that the building had been massacred. However, once the new tenant, Fosbury & Sons, closely examined the interior architecture, they were impressed by how thoroughly thought out everything was, with their interior architects describing the building as self-explanatory once they took a good look at the floor plans and layout. The tenant planned to preserve many of Brodzki's architectural details and had no plans to demolish anything, with one of the founders of Fosbury & Sons remarking that "Brodzki was very forward-thinking, and we still reap the benefits of that today".

In 1979, the CBR Building was the only project in Belgium by a Belgian architect that was selected for a Museum of Modern Art exhibition entitled Transformations in Modern Architecture. (Note: The Banque Lambert building in Brussels had also been selected, but this building had been designed by U.S. architect Gordon Bunshaft of Skidmore, Owings & Merrill.) -- something may have been lost in translation, as the catalogue mentions the banque lambert building and contains a picture of it as well, but appears to neither mention the cbr building nor contain a picture of it, as seen at https://web.archive.org/web/20200525100948if_/https://assets.moma.org/documents/moma_catalogue_1773_300296962.pdf --> In 2018, the government of Brussels placed the building under protection.

Concrete exterior of CBR Building and detail of its façade in 2020

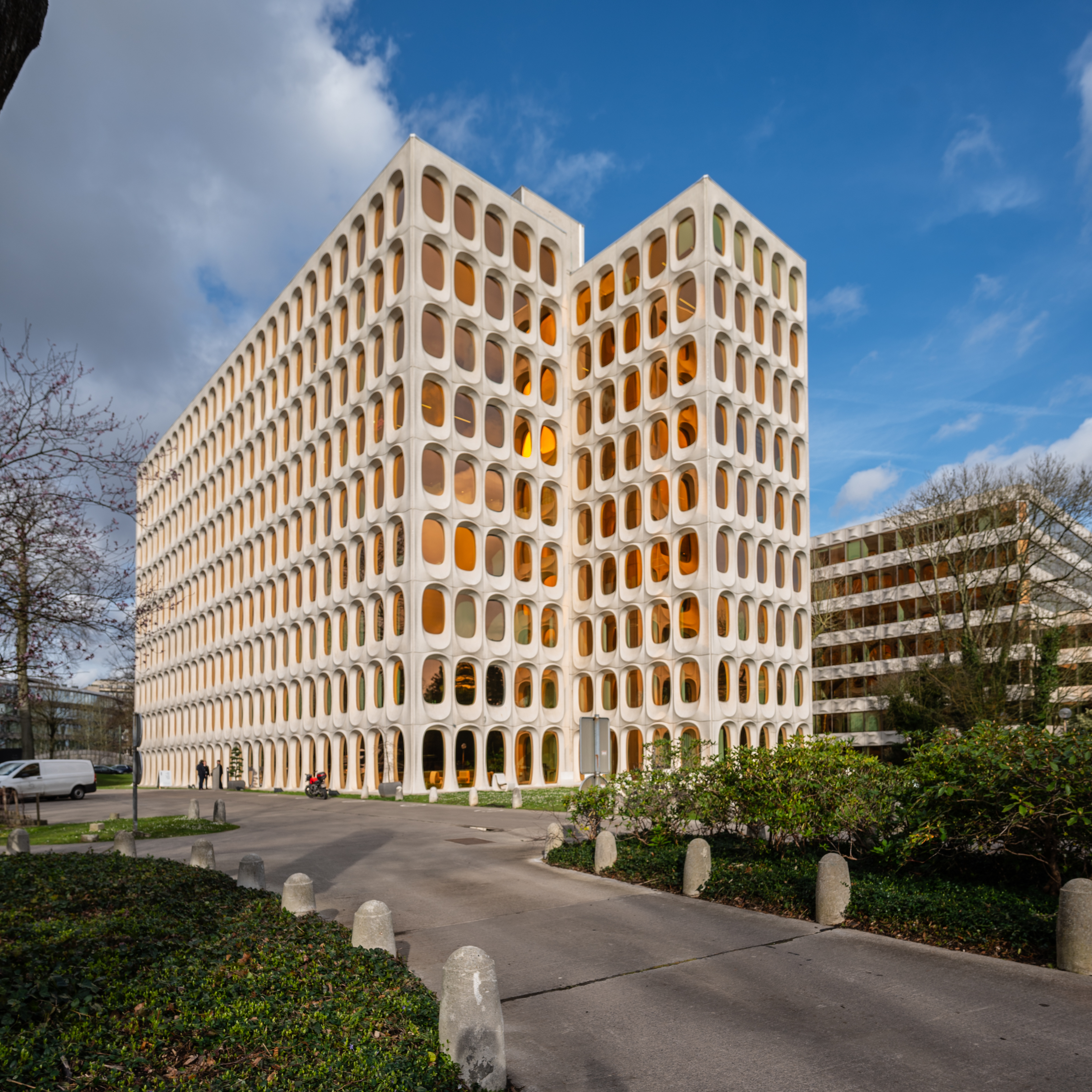

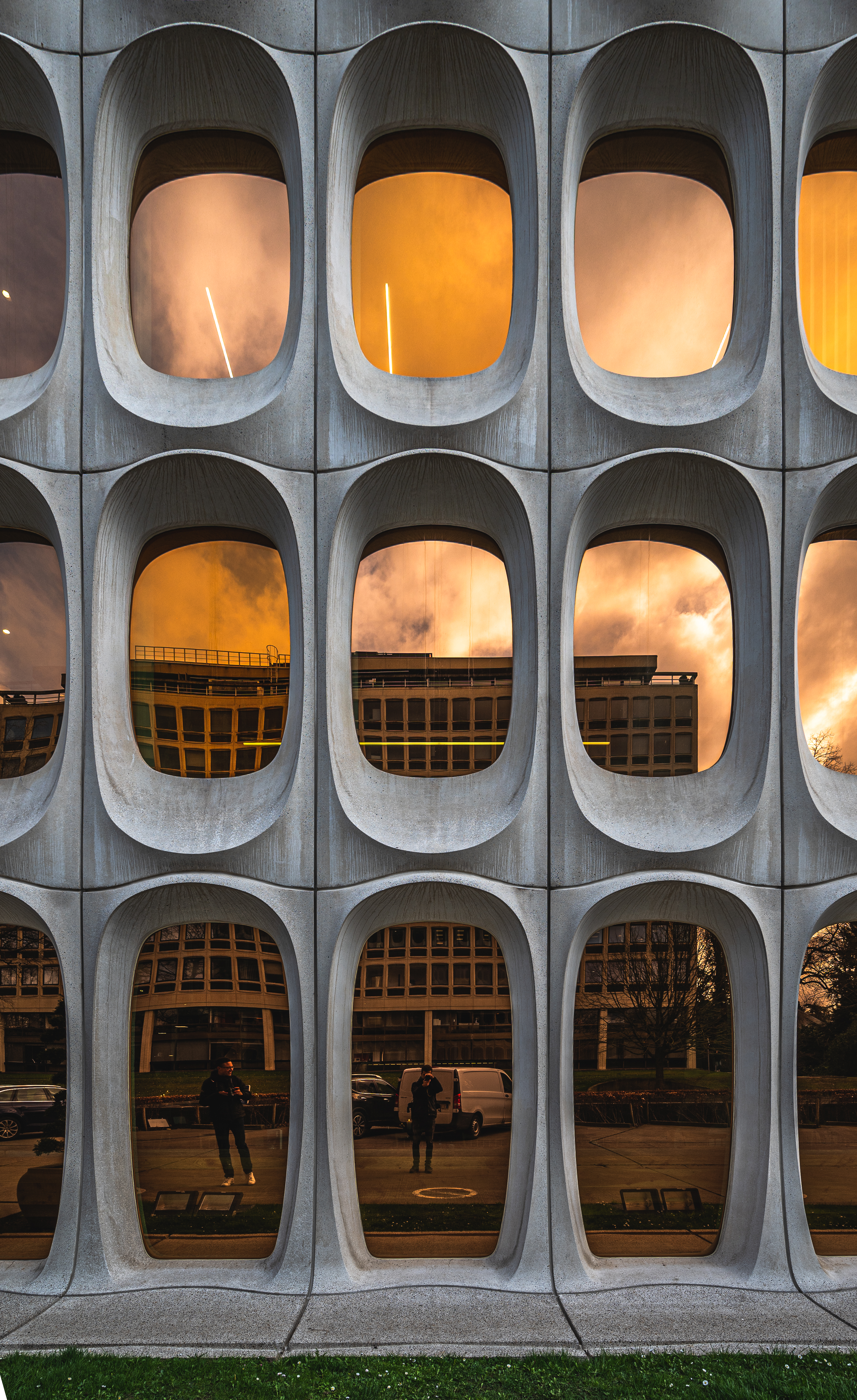

== Influence ==
Brodzki's use of prefabricated concrete modules in organic shapes for building façades was eventually called "CBR-style" in Belgium. By the end of the 1970s, an increased number of buildings using this style were erected, including the Rob Supermarket in Woluwe-Saint-Pierre and the former town hall of Etterbeek on Avenue d'Auderghem. However, the trend had waned by the early 1980s. Brodzki posited that the decline was due to a lack of coordinated understanding of the material by the construction team. When he had first developed his method of creating prefabricated concrete modules in organic forms, Brodzki noted that the complexity of the project required everyone to understand what they were doing.

== Realisations ==
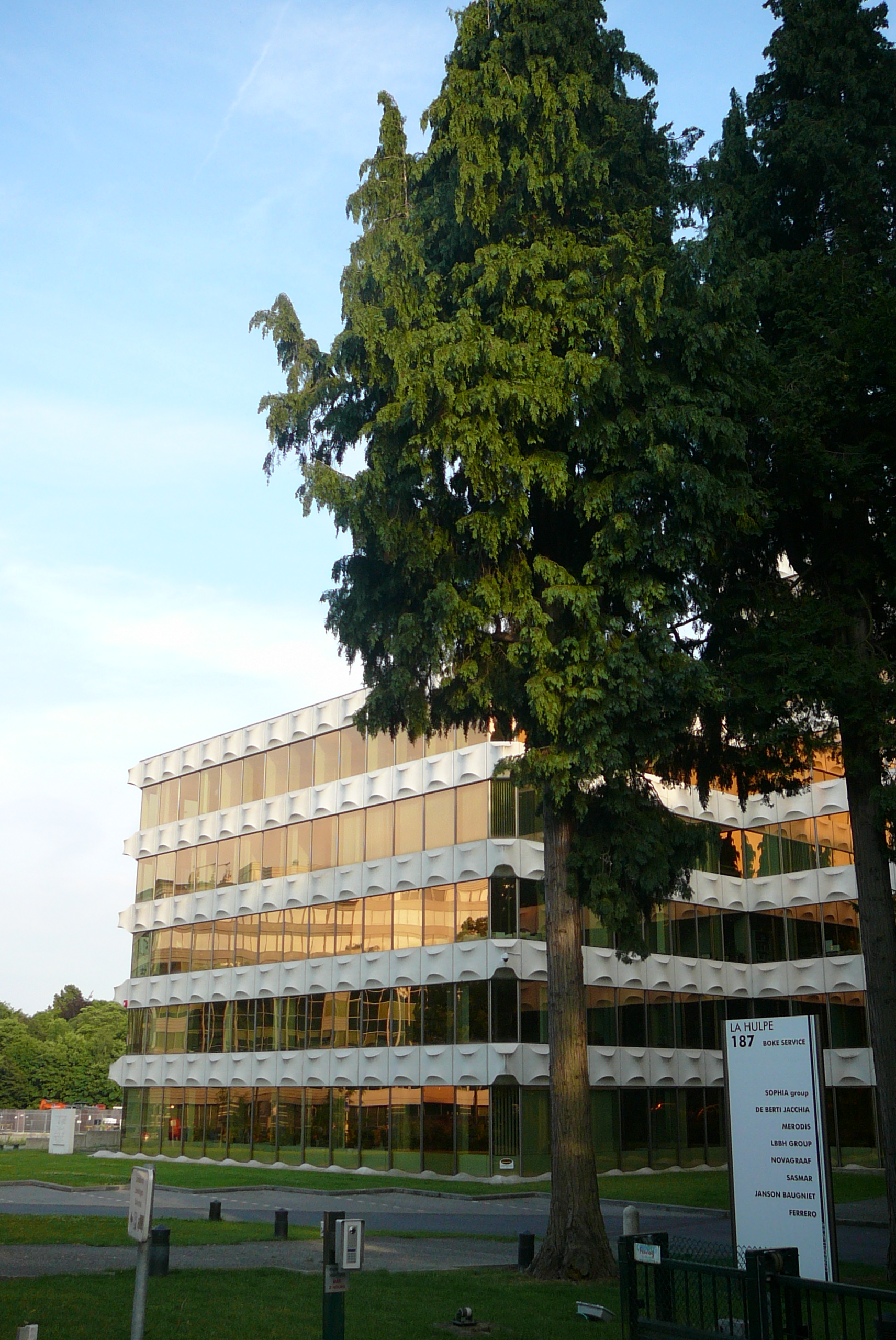
Office building in Brussels designed for Generali, as seen in 2017

- Cultural centre Casino, Houthalen-Helchteren, Limburg (1953)
- Weekend stay Van Pachterbeek, Sint-Genesius-Rode, Flemish Brabant (1954)
- Cinema Museum, (Note: The museum was reopened under the new name "Cinematek" in 2009.) Brussels (1962–2006) with Corneille Hannoset
- Design Center in the Ravenstein Gallery, Brussels (1963)
- CBR Building, Watermaal-Bosvoorde, Brussels (1970)
- Generali office building, Watermaal-Bosvoorde, Brussels (1976)
- Residence Klenowicz, Sint-Genesius-Rode, Flemish Brabant (1976)
- Swift I, Terhulpen, Brussels (1983)
- Swift II, Terhulpen, Brussels (1988)

Apart from these larger projects, Brodzki also designed a few houses.
