= Piet Vermeylen =

Belgian lawyer, socialist politician and minister

Piet Vermeylen (8 April 1904 in Uccle – 30 December 1991 in Brussels, also called Pierre Vermeylen by some Belgian French sources), was a Belgian lawyer, and socialist politician and minister. He was the son of the Flemish politician August Vermeylen.

== Early life ==
In 1924, Piet was one of the founders of a Flemish study group at the Université libre de Bruxelles. In 1933, Vermeylen was one of the judges at the London Counter-trial of the Reichstag fire. In 1938, together with Henri Storck and André Thirifays, he founded the Cinémathèque royale de Belgique.

== Political career ==
After his father's death, Piet succeeded him in the Flemish socialist politics of Brussels. Notwithstanding what German occupiers had done to his father, he vehemently protested the execution of Flemish collaborationist August Borms. From 1947 to 1949, he was Minister for Internal Affairs. He again became a minister for Internal affairs in 1954 and for four years had to defend the secularist school policies of the Liberal-Socialist coalition under Prime Minister Achille Van Acker in the face of Roman Catholic opposition, at one time controversially forbidding Belgian Radio to report on a large-scale demonstration against the new school laws proposed by Education minister Leo Collard.

From 1961 to 1965 he was Belgian Justice minister under Théo Lefèvre. In 1961 he proposed the first law on amnesty for those who had collaborated with Nazi Germany during the Second World War. In April 1964, after unsuccessfully trying to soften the wrath of many Belgian doctors over a speech by the Prime Minister and so preventing the ensuing notorious "doctors' strike", he lent his support to the civil mobilization of all hospital doctors and of doctors who were members of the Belgian reserve army.

When in 1968, French-speaking socialist politicians in Brussels (led by Henri Simonet) arranged the Brussels party list to ensure Piet Vermeylen, Hendrik Fayat and other Flemish socialist politicians from Brussels, Halle and Vilvoorde were virtually unelectable, Vermeylen took the unprecedented step of splitting the party and forming a rival Brussels Flemish Socialist Party, called "Red Lions". After his surprise re-election, he became the first Belgian Minister of Dutch Language Education in the new government, led by Christian Social Prime Minister Gaston Eyskens. When armies of the Warsaw Pact invaded Czechoslovakia in August 1968, Vermeylen, who was secretly visiting Brno as a simple tourist, barely managed to escape to Austria. He stayed on as a minister until 1972, and soon after quit active politics. In 1984, he wrote an autobiography.

== Bibliography ==
- "Een Gulzig Leven", Kritak, January 1984. ISBN 978-90-6303-132-9
