= Cinematek =

Belgium national cinematheque located in Brussels

CINEMATEK
- Cinémathèque Royale de Belgique (French); Koninklijk Belgisch Filmarchief (Dutch)
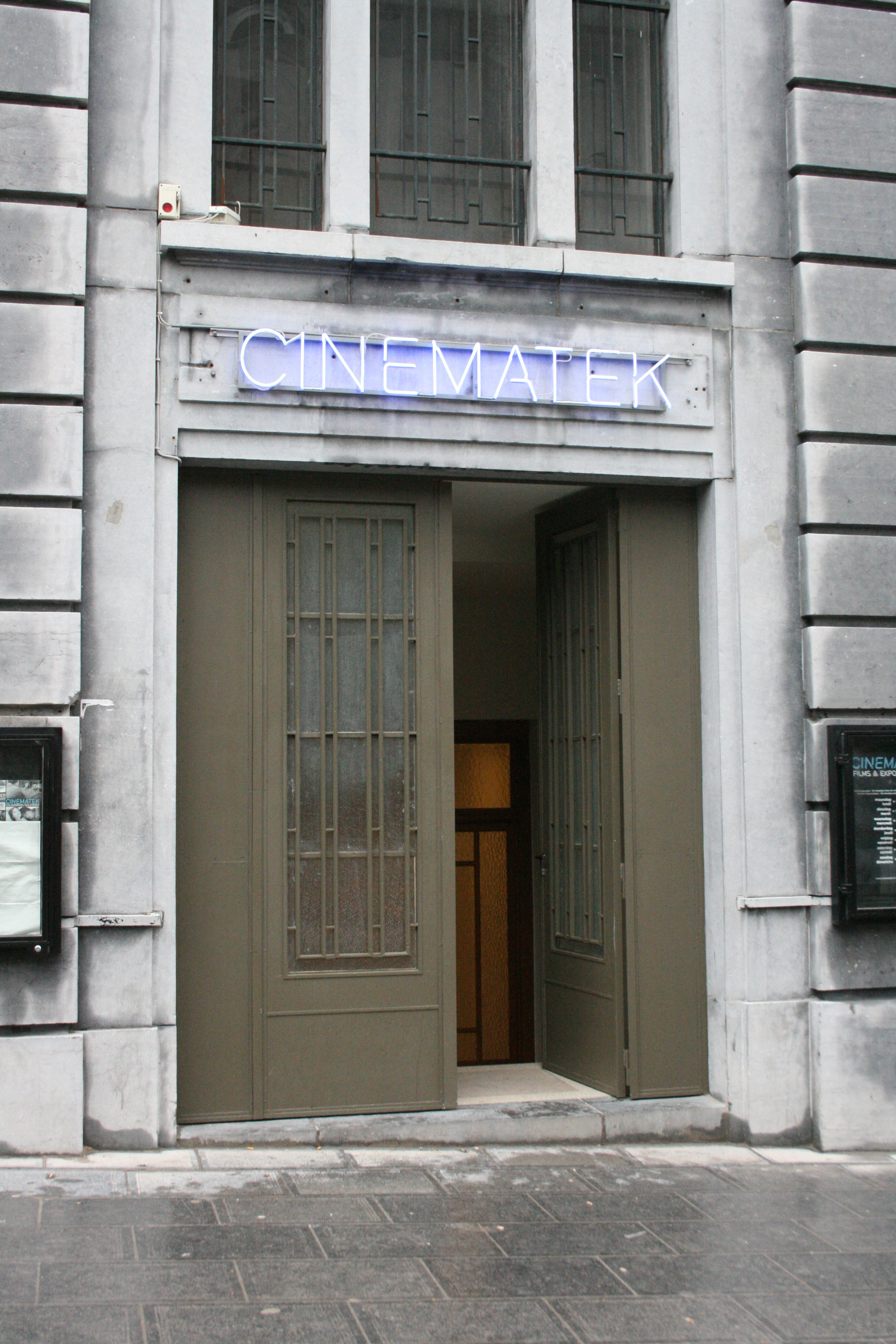
- CINEMATEK seen from Rue Baron Horta/Baron Hortastraat

- Location within Brussels Location within Belgium
- Established: April 9, 1938; 88 years ago
- Location: Centre for Fine Arts, Brussels
- Coordinates: 50°50′39″N 4°21′36″E
- Type: Cinematheque
- Founders: Henri Storck; André Thirifays; Piet Vermeylen
- Public transit access: Brussels-Central; 1 5 Gare Centrale/Centraal Station and Parc/Park
- Website: www.cinematek.be

The Royal Belgian Film Archive (French: Cinémathèque Royale de Belgique; Dutch: Koninklijk Belgisch Filmarchief), operating under the brand name CINEMATEK, is the national cinematheque of Belgium. The institution collects, preserves and makes available an extensive film collection, with a particular focus on Belgian cinema, and also organises film screenings, exhibitions and educational programmes.

CINEMATEK is a bicultural public utility foundation, subsidised by BELSPO and supported by the National Lottery. Its aim is to preserve films and documentation of lasting aesthetic, technical or historical value and make them accessible to researchers, students, journalists and film enthusiasts.

== History ==
=== Founding ===
The Royal Belgian Film Archive has its origins in the 1930s, a period when the first film museums were established throughout Europe and beyond. Stockholm opened its cinematek in 1933, followed by Berlin in 1934, Milan, London and New York in 1935, and in 1936 Henri Langlois founded the Cinémathèque française in Paris. In Brussels, three young intellectuals, André Thirifays, Henri Storck and Piet Vermeylen, who had been organising the film club Le Club de l'Écran (transl. The Screen Club) since 1931, decided not only to screen quality films, but also to actively contribute to the preservation of film history. Encouraged by Henri Langlois, with whom they had built up a close relationship, they founded the non-profit organisation Belgian Film Archive on 9 April 1938.

Nevertheless, the Archive had a difficult start. Despite the enthusiasm of its founders and their team, including Dimitri Balachoff, Paul Davay and René Jauniaux, the collection only contained three films until 1944. Development was slow and was often ignored or viewed with contempt by political authorities. It was not until 1951 that the institution received its first public subsidy. Until the end of the 1960s, the Archive focused mainly on organising art and experimental film screenings at the Centre for Fine Arts, as part of L'Écran du Séminaire des Arts (transl. The Screen of the Arts Seminar), the successor to Le Club de l'Écran, often using copies kindly provided by Henri Langlois.

=== Jacques Ledoux ===
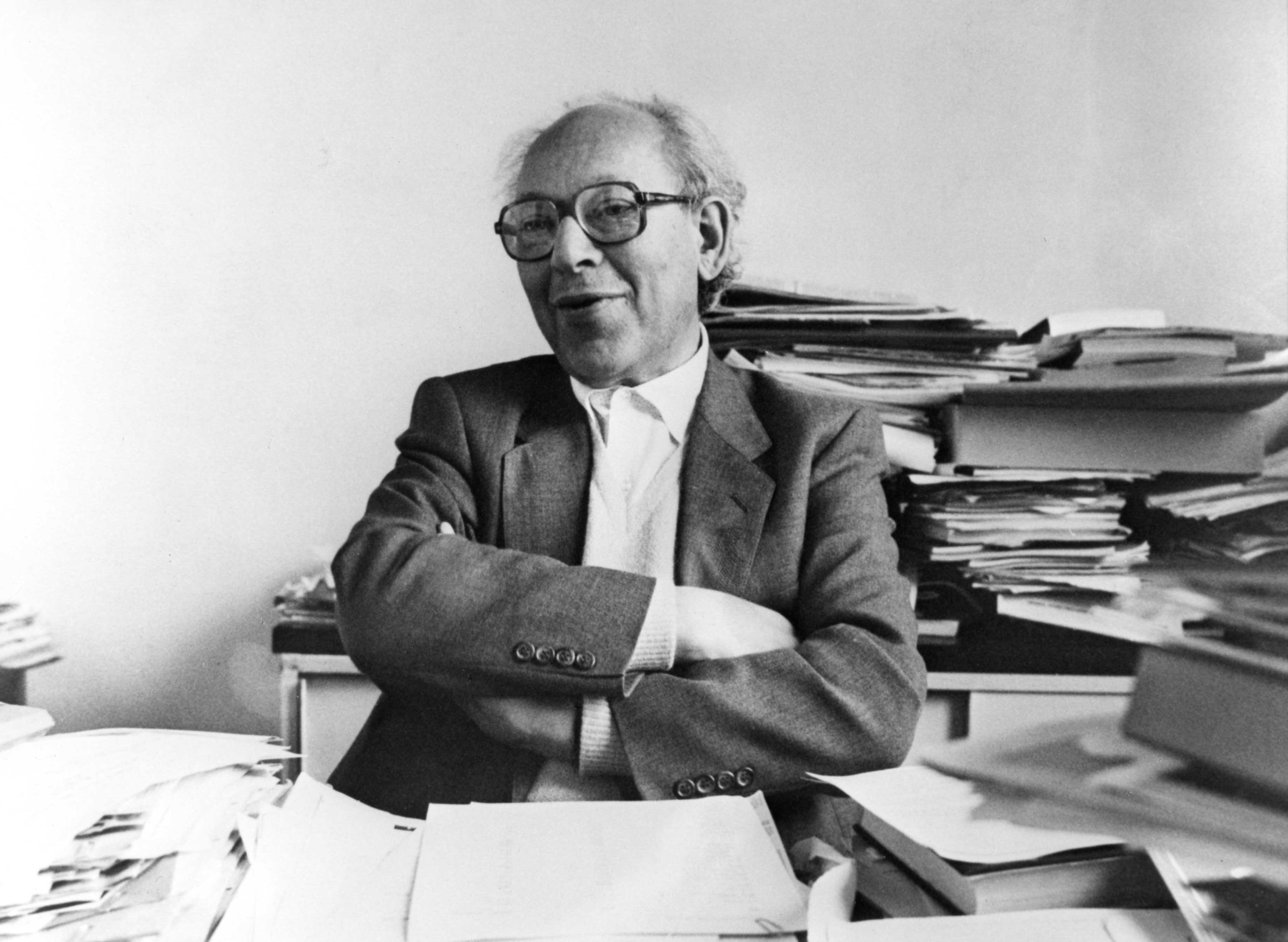
Ledoux shortly after receiving the Erasmus Prize (1988)

An important turning point for the Archive came after the Second World War with the arrival of Jacques Ledoux. After the war, he offered his services to the Archive and became its official curator in 1958, a position he held until his death in 1988. Ledoux became the face of the Archive, driven by his passion for cinema and for preserving film heritage. He strengthened the professional organisation, set up extensive archiving and conservation systems, and established a restoration department. Under his leadership, the collection grew considerably and the institution became one of the most important film archives in Europe.

The film collection grew rapidly, prompting Jacques Ledoux to establish the Film Museum in the Centre for Fine Arts on 21 December 1961, in collaboration with architect Constantin Brodzki and visual artist Corneille Hannoset. The Museum initially offered a small auditorium with a hundred seats and was later expanded to include exhibition spaces on the prehistory of cinema and a silent film theatre.

Ledoux organised important international competitions for experimental films, such as EXPRMNTL and L’Âge d’Or, and ensured the screening of high-quality new films with Ciné-découvertes. His ethics for collection management, with a clear distinction between showing and preserving, also influenced his role within the International Federation of Film Archives, where he held various positions between 1961 and 1977.

=== Financial difficulties and merger ===
In October 2000, the Federal Government removed the Archive from the scientific policy department of the federal budget and transferred responsibility for its subsidies to the National Lottery. While Gabrielle Claes was curator, she reported that this change created significant financial complications. The National Lottery initially refused to pay 80 percent of the Archive’s budget at the start of the year and only provided funds quarterly. A special royal decree was required to release the subsidy, but its delay left the Archive without access to essential resources, forcing it to borrow money to cover basic expenses.

Claes also highlighted challenges related to storage and expansion. The first floor of a new building was already full, and the Archive had received approximately 6,000 new films in a single year. Additional floors required investment in air conditioning, shelving and other infrastructure, which she estimated at six to seven million Belgian francs. Claes noted that these costs, combined with staff salaries and mortgage repayments for a recently acquired second storage facility, placed a significant strain on the institution.

She criticised the reliance on National Lottery funding, which she described as unpredictable and unsuitable for long-term planning. Unlike other cultural institutions with multi-year funding, the Archive’s operations were assessed annually, making sustainability and preservation more difficult. Claes secured public statements of support from filmmakers, including Martin Scorsese.

On 10 December 2002, the Museum ceased to exist as an independent non-profit organisation and was integrated into the Archive.

=== Renovation ===
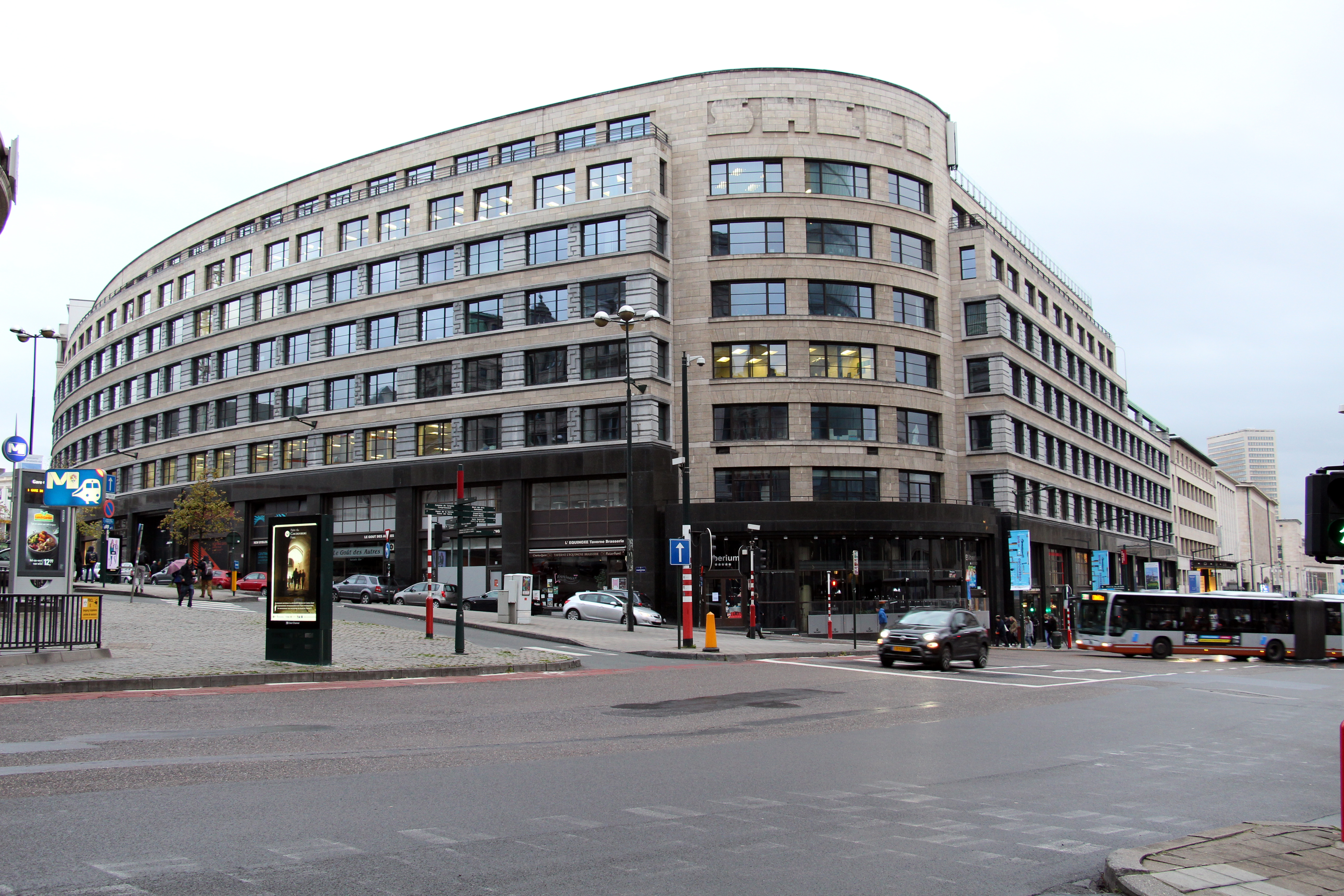
Central Gate seen from Marché au Bois/Houtmarkt

From 2006 to 2008, film screenings were temporarily housed in Central Gate due to a major renovation of the Archive. Under the direction of Robbrecht & Daem, the Decorative Arts Room was restored to its original Art Deco style and furnished as a reception and exhibition space. In addition, two new film theatres were built underground, a technically challenging project due to the limitations of the building.

On 31 January 2009, the Royal Belgian Film Archive reopened under the new name CINEMATEK, more than a year later than planned and six years after the first renovation works had started. In addition to a space for the permanent collection of objects from the history of cinema, the renovated building houses two cinema theatres: the Ledoux theatre (117 seats; named after Jacques Ledoux) and the Plateau theatre (29 seats; named after Joseph Plateau, inventor of the phenakistoscope). Both auditoriums are equipped with analogue and digital projectors and have a piano for live accompaniment. The Plateau auditorium is mainly used for silent film screenings.

To mark the reopening, CINEMATEK organised an open weekend with screenings of films by François Ozon, Alfred Hitchcock, Tex Avery, Buster Keaton and Charlie Chaplin, among others. In the months that followed, film cycles on New Hollywood and Belgian cinema were presented, as well as retrospectives dedicated to Luis Buñuel, Ernst Lubitsch, Joseph Mankiewicz, Rainer Werner Fassbinder and Alfred Hitchcock. In 2011, CINEMATEK had 143,318 film copies, representing 67,213 titles, ranging from fiction and documentaries to short and feature films, with an annual growth of approximately 2,000 copies.

An important current focus remains the digitisation of the collection, a costly but necessary step to preserve films now that traditional film layers such as acetate are beginning to degrade.

== Collection ==
CINEMATEK holds one of Europe’s most diverse film collections, including fiction films, documentaries, and newsreels documenting Belgian and international history. While its focus is on Belgian cinema, the archive also preserves significant international films, including works on film by Man Ray, Marcel Duchamp, and Fernand Léger. As of 2018, the archive held 47,726 films and over 100,000 film materials, with more than 8,000 items originating from Belgium. The holdings are accessible through screenings, exhibitions, lectures, educational programmes, publications, and digital platforms.

The cinematheque has works of Chantal Akerman, which includes her films, scripts, letters, research materials, photographs, press articles, interviews, subtitles, and production documents, many of which are catalogued, digitised, and partly available for consultation in the CINEMATEK Library. It also holds the works and personal collections of Charles Dekeukeleire, an early Belgian filmmaker and avant-garde pioneer; Henri Storck, known for both documentary and experimental cinema spanning silent and sound periods and one of the founders of CINEMATEK; and Alfred Machin, a French filmmaker active in Belgium from 1908 and regarded as a foundational figure in Belgian cinema.

In addition, CINEMATEK manages film collections from Belgian government agencies, including the army, National Railway Company of Belgium, and Sabena, encompassing training films, advertisements, and interviews. The archive also preserves footage from conflicts involving Belgium, including the First and Second World Wars.

== Preservation and Management of Film Collections ==
CINEMATEK acquires films through deposits and donations from distributors, producers, institutions, and individuals. New items undergo physical assessment to determine their condition, with attention to mould, rust, odours, and decomposition. Films at risk, including those affected by vinegar syndrome, are isolated for treatment. Items are identified, catalogued, and stored according to pellicle type such as nitrate, acetate, or polyester under climate-controlled conditions to ensure long-term preservation.

Digitisation and restoration are carried out through the Digilab. The centre is equipped with advanced scanning equipment, restoration software, and infrared technologies. Restoration is performed on copies rather than originals and includes cleaning, repair, scanning, stabilisation, defect correction, and colour calibration. Reference materials or consultation with filmmakers may be used to ensure fidelity to the original work.

Digital preservation uses open formats, with films stored on servers and Linear Tape-Open (LTOs) tapes and regularly migrated to newer media. Standardised deposits include uncompressed masters, Digital Cinema Packages (DCPs), mezzanine files, and associated documentation. Multiple backups are maintained at separate locations to safeguard long-term access to both analogue and born-digital film materials.

== Curators ==
- Jacques Ledoux, 1958 to 1988
- Gabrielle Claes, 1988 to 2011
- Wouter Hessels, 2011 to 2011
- Nicola Mazzanti, 2012 to 2020
- Tomas Leyers 2020 to
