= Jules Wabbes =

Belgian furniture designer and interior architect

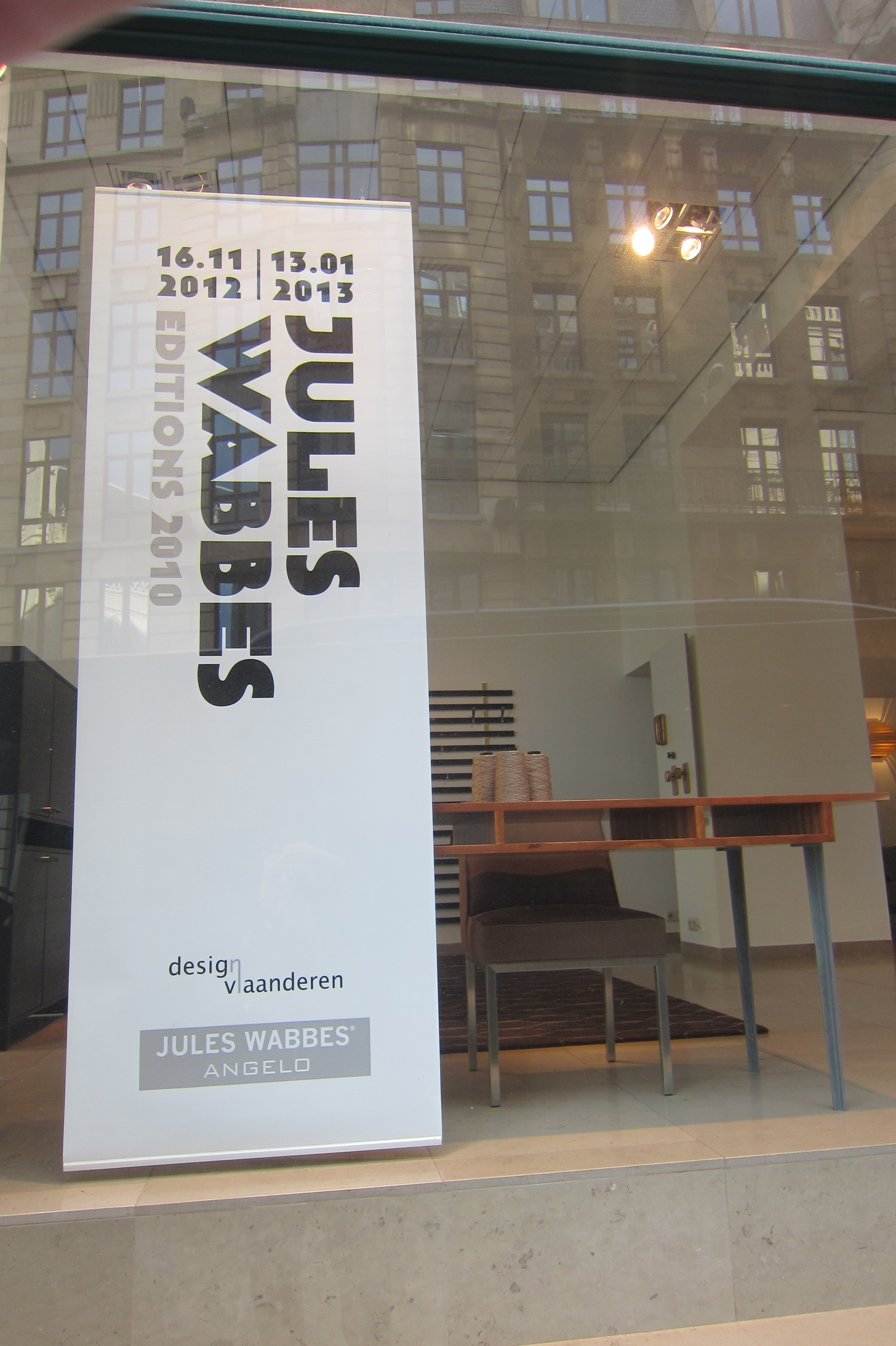
Exhibition in Brussels work of Jules Wabbes with table Gérard Philipe

Jules Jean Sylvain Wabbes (1919–1974) was a Belgian furniture designer and interior architect. Born in Saint-Gilles, Belgium, Wabbes began his career as an actor and after several other jobs, eventually opened an antiques and decoration shop in Brussels. He created his own furniture in a modernist style and was chosen by several Belgian administrations to design and create functional furniture. All his works are based on the expression of pure quality with excellent materials (plain wood, bronze, brass). He is especially famous for his office desks, tables, wall lamps, and casts.

== Biography ==
Jules Wabbes was the son of Henry Justin Gommaire Wabbes (1874–1959), and Rachel Pintens (1890–1946). The family came from Mechelen and practiced the profession of boatman or timber merchant.

Wabbes was not a very good student and left school at the age of sixteen. He became a freelance photographer and established his studio at Chaussée de Charleroi in Brussels in his father's drugstore.

After the Second World War, Wabbes opened an antique shop with Louise Carrey on Chaussée de Charleroi in Brussels. Wabbes was very talented with the placing and layout of interesting objects, and some customers asked for advice on placing the furniture which led him to begin with interior decoration. He liked old furniture and furniture pieces that were manufactured with recycled materials which included old beds and balconies in wrought iron. With his interests, he opened a restoration workshop and studied the construction techniques of old furniture. His friends in the art community encouraged Wabbes to move to contemporary designs.

He married the designer, cartoonist, illustrator, and author of children's books known as Marie Wabbes on 3 February 1960, with whom he had four children: Sylvie, Marie, Julie, and Henry.

Wabbes was awarded several prizes, notably the Milan Triennal fair, and he was considered at the time one of the most talented Belgian interior architects.

In April 1965, he was appointed "Knight of the Order of the Crown" in Belgium.

Jules Wabbes was an architecture professor at the Institut Saint-Luc in Brussels in 1971.

== Works ==
The development of offices and businesses was Jules Wabbes' specialty. He also built boats, private homes, and student housing.

In cooperation with Belgium's famous architect André Jacqmain, Wabbes designed the furniture of the Foncolin building (Fonds colonial des Invalidités) and the Glaverbel buildings in Brussels. Other works included the fittings of the Bibliothèque des Sciences, the Science Library for the new UCLouvain (Université catholique de Louvain), and the interiors of Sabena airplanes. Wabbes did renovations of the new Embassy of the United States in The Hague, designed by Marcel Breuer, and the interiors of the United States Embassies in London, Brussels, Dakar, and Rabat.

His first Slats furniture line stemmed from his desire to use a durable material. He chose wood at first but had problems with tension and cracks appearing on the surface. Wabbes determined the decorative value of a piece of furniture by the ways of putting in each timber.

Jules Wabbes was chosen by the Belgian airline Sabena to study the interior of their aircraft. He worked with Sabena engineers and visited the factories of Douglas Aircraft Company, Santa Monica in California and San Diego at Convair.

== Bibliography ==
Serulus, Katarina. "Jules Wabbes: Furniture Designer." Design Issues 30, no. 3 (Summer2014 2014): 89–91. Business Source Complete, EBSCOhost (accessed 29 September 2016).

Serulus, Katarina. "Exhibition and book review of Jules Wabbes: furniture designer." Design Issues 30, no. 3 (Summer 2014): 89–91. Avery Index to Architectural Periodicals, EBSCOhost (accessed 29 September 2016).

"Jules Wabbes." (21 April 2010): Biography Reference Bank (H.W. Wilson), EBSCOhost (accessed 29 September 2016).

Pombo, Fátima. "Jules Wabbes (1919-1974): Creating Total Works of Art in Interiors." Journal of Interior Design 39, no. 3 (September 2014): 25–39. Art Abstracts (H.W. Wilson), EBSCOhost (accessed 29 September 2016).

Pombo, Fátima, and Hilde Heynen. "Jules Wabbes and the modern design of American embassies." Interiors: Design, Architecture, Culture 5, no. 3 (November 2014): 315–339. EBSCOhost (accessed 29 September 2016).

Vedrenne, Elisabeth. "Bulo réédite le Belge Jules Wabbes. (French)." Connaissance Des Arts no. 680 (March 2010): 12. (H.W. Wilson), EBSCOhost (accessed 29 September 2016).

J.-F., L. "LES PROTOTYPES RAFFINÉS DE JULES WABBES. (French)." Connaissance Des Arts no. 709 (November 2012): 50. (H.W. Wilson), EBSCOhost (accessed 29 September 2016).

A., C. "LA GRANDE DÉCO SELON DUTKO. (French)." Connaissance Des Arts no. 732 (December 2014): 122. Art Abstracts (H.W. Wilson), EBSCOhost (accessed 29 September 2016).

Marie Ferran-Wabbes (2002). Jules Wabbes 1919-1974: architecte d'intérieur. Dexia. ISBN 978-2-87193-290-1.

Marie Ferran-Wabbles; Jurgen Persijn; Iwan Strauven (2013). Jules Wabbes: Furniture Designer. A+editions. ISBN 9789490814038.
