= Jacques Ledoux =

Polish-born Belgian film archivist (1921–1988)

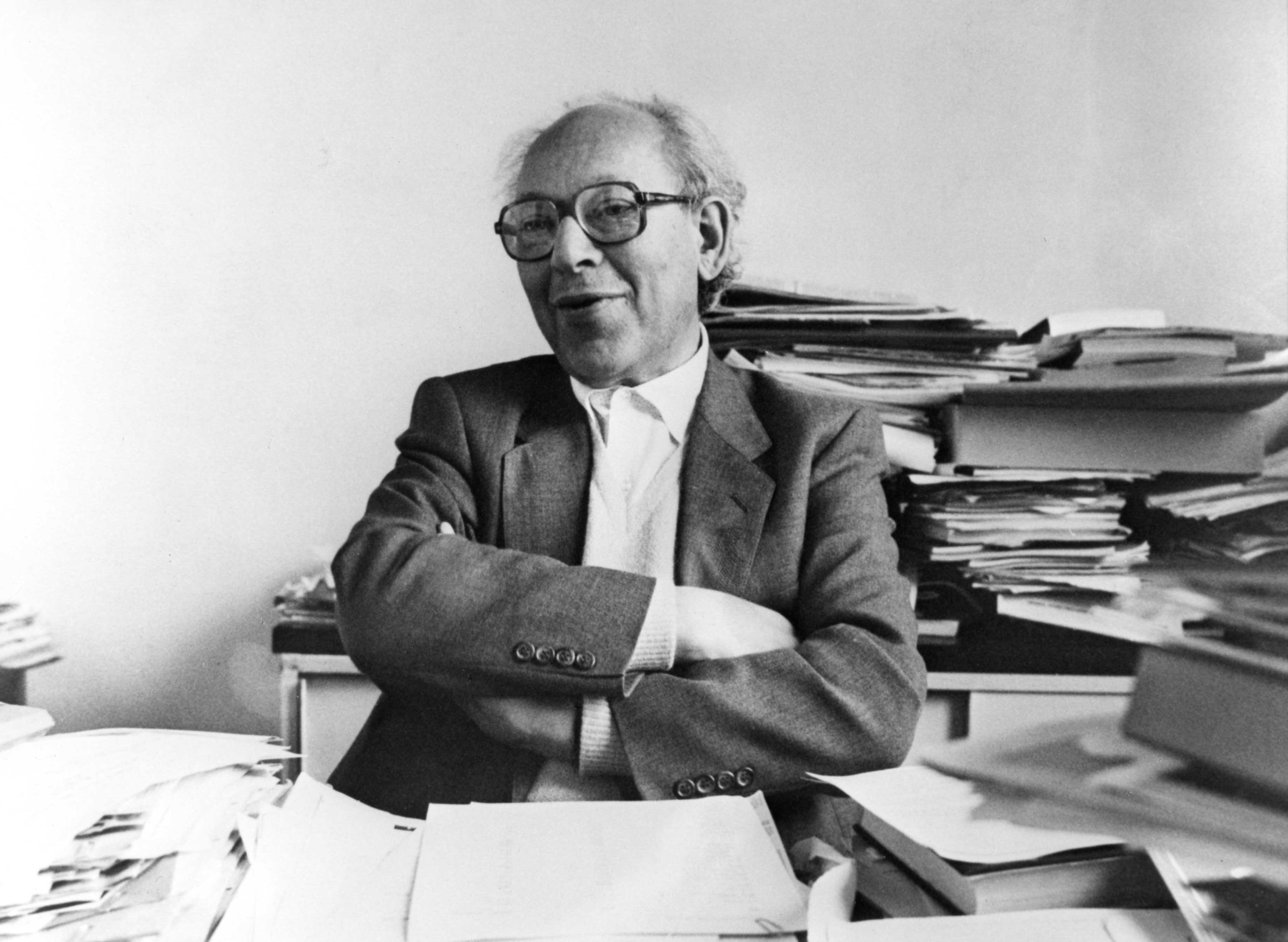
Jacques Ledoux

Jacques Ledoux (1921 – 6 June 1988) was a Polish-born Belgian cinema specialist, the first curator of the Royal Film Archive of Belgium (Cinémathèque royale de Belgique) from 1948 to 1988 and the founder of the Cinema Museum in Brussels (Musée du cinéma de Bruxelles) in 1962. He was born in Warsaw and died in Brussels.

== Awards and honors ==
Ledoux received the Erasmus Prize, a Dutch award for contributions to art in 1988.
