= Central Gate =

Functionalist building in Brussels, Belgium

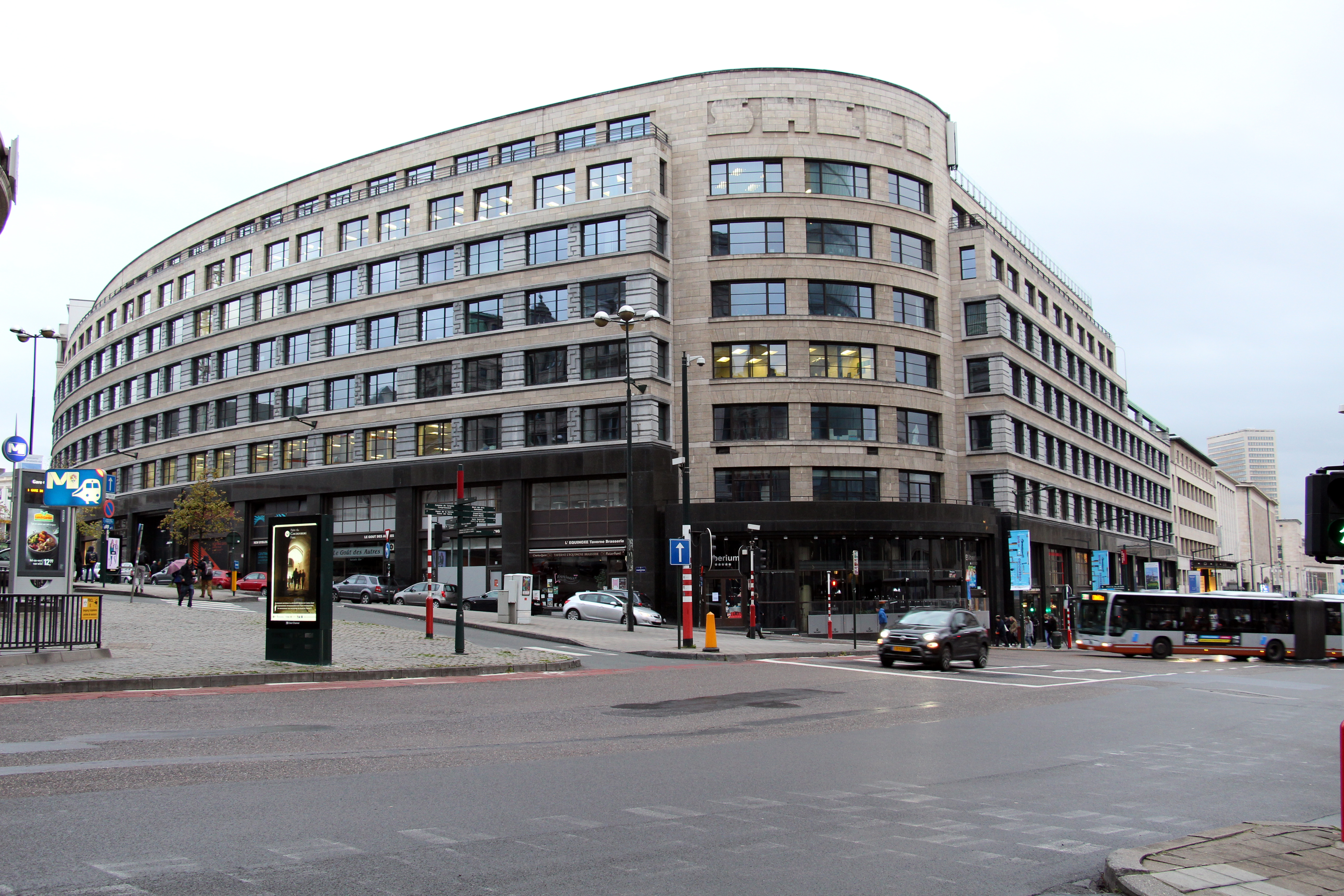
- Central Gate seen from Marché au Bois/Houtmarkt
- Interactive map of the Central Gate area
- Alternative names: Shell Building

General information
- Architectural style: New Objectivity
- Location: Pentagon, 39–55 Cantersteen/Kantersteen, City of Brussels, Belgium
- Coordinates: 50°50′43″N 4°21′31″E
- Construction started: 1931
- Completed: 1934

Design and construction
- Architects: Alexis Dumont; Marcel Van Goethem

Other information
- Public transit access: Brussels-Central; 1 5 Gare Centrale/Centraal Station

Central Gate also known as the Shell Building is a large office and retail complex in central Brussels, Belgium, designed in the New Objectivity style by Alexis Dumont and completed in 1934 with the collaboration of Marcel Van Goethem. Commissioned by Shell Immeubles Belges, it originally served as the Belgian headquarters of Shell and incorporated shops, offices, and a rental car park, reflecting modern functional and commercial design of the interwar period.

Located at 39–55 Cantersteen/Kantersteen, at the star-shaped junction of the Marché au Bois/Houtmarkt, the building stands near Brussels-Central railway station and within walking distance of the Mont des Arts/Kunstberg.

== History ==
The site of the Shell Building was originally occupied by Putterij, a residential neighbourhood that included the Renaissance style Granvelle Palace. The palace, constructed in the 16th century for Antoine Perrenot de Granvelle, was considered one of the finest Renaissance palaces in the Low Countries. It was demolished during the mid-20th century and replaced by the Ravenstein Gallery as part of the broader redevelopment of the area.

Between 1911 and 1913, the Rue Ravenstein/Ravensteinstraat was constructed as a raised viaduct, replacing the dense medieval quarter and reshaping the district around the Cathedral of St. Michael and St. Gudula and Mont des Arts. Initial plans for the redevelopment of the site were proposed by the architect van Hardeveld, who did not comply with municipal sightline regulations, and later by Victor Horta, whose plans were abandoned following the Great Depression.

In 1921, architect Alexis Dumont was commissioned to design the Shell Building. His design was inspired by Horta's proposals but developed as a distinct complex. Construction began in 1931 and was completed in 1934, with assistance from Marcel Van Goethem. The project was originally conceived as the first phase of a larger scheme, including a planned 90-metre tower on the inner courtyard. A revised 80-metre tower proposal was submitted in 1937 but rejected due to the building's proximity to the Cathedral and the Rue Montagne du Parc/Warandeberg. After 1955, the courtyard was instead filled with more modest extensions.

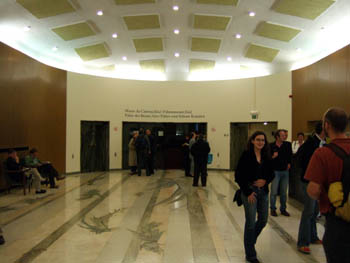
Entrance to the auditorium

In September 2006, the Film Museum temporarily relocated to the auditorium for one year while its original facility at the Centre for Fine Arts underwent renovations. The Shell Auditorium was upgraded with modern film equipment during this period. The creation of two new underground cinemas at the Centre for Fine Arts took longer than expected, and on 31 January 2009 the museum reopened at its renovated location under the new name, CINEMATEK.

== Architecture ==
=== Exterior ===
The building has an L-shaped layout with a curved east wing extending into a corner rotunda. Its stepped silhouette features projecting and recessed volumes, while the façade, spanning 42 bays, adapts to the slope of the Rue Ravenstein and Cantersteen. Lower storeys are heavily glazed and clad in black Labrador granite with bronze-framed shopfronts, while upper storeys are faced with Savonnières limestone, featuring recessed window registers, stepped reductions, and restrained geometric decoration.

The west entrance, redesigned by Dumont in 1959, incorporates a sculptural shell motif by Olivier Strebelle. The building was originally crowned with cylindrical lanterns and a bronze balustrade, and the rotunda once displayed a relief Shell logo on its upper section.

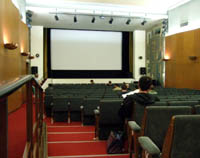
Auditorium

=== Interior ===
The interior originally included a car park beneath the east wing and shops around the inner courtyard, connected by a gallery. Vertical circulation was provided by three staircases and four groups of lifts. The east wing contained flexible rental offices, while Shell installed offices and laboratories in the rotunda and west wing, including executive rooms, a boardroom decorated by Baucher and Féron, and a restaurant with a rooftop terrace.

The auditorium, located on the ground floor, is a 1950s cinema reflecting the building's modernised interior adaptations. Its 270-seat auditorium represents a mid-century update within the historic Art Deco framework, with the ground floor retaining its black granite cladding.
