= List of Asterix characters =

Some characters of Asterix. In the front row are the main Gaulish characters, plus Julius Caesar and Cleopatra.

This is a list of characters in the Asterix comics, using their names in the English translations of the books.

== Main characters ==
Asterix, Obelix and Dogmatix are the first characters with short descriptions usually listed at the beginning of each of the Asterix books (after the map of Gaul).

=== Asterix ===
Asterix is the main character. He is a brave, intelligent and shrewd warrior of somewhat diminutive size, who eagerly volunteers for all perilous missions.

=== Obelix ===
Obelix is Asterix's closest friend and works as a menhir sculptor and delivery man. He is a tall, obese man (he refers to himself as "well-padded" or "man with a slipped chest" and will immediately knock out anyone who calls him "fat") with two notable attributes: his permanently phenomenal strength and his voracious appetite for food, especially wild boar. His strength results from having fallen into Getafix's magic potion cauldron as a child. As a consequence, Getafix will not let him take additional potions for fear of side effects (for example, turning into stone, as shown in Asterix and Obelix all at Sea), something that Obelix finds immensely unfair. The only exception was in Asterix and Cleopatra when they were trapped in a pyramid and Getafix allows him to have three drops of the magic potion. Obelix's size is often the brunt of many jokes. In Asterix and the Big Fight, the druid Psychoanalytix mistakes Obélix for a patient with an eating disorder. At the end of the book, Obelix decides to go on a diet, but quickly goes back to eating huge quantities of boar.

=== Dogmatix ===
First appearance: Asterix and the Banquet (book 5 in France).

Dogmatix is Obelix's pet dog. Unlike his immense master, Dogmatix is very tiny, but he can have a nasty temper. Dogmatix met Asterix and Obelix in Lutetia (in Asterix and the Banquet) and followed them all the way around Gaul until Obelix finally noticed him when they reached the village. He is only given a name in the next book, Asterix and Cleopatra, where he is shown to have been adopted by Obelix. Dogmatix has an "environmentalist" side, often bursting into despaired howls whenever he sees a tree get knocked down. He is also prone to jealousy towards any women that Obelix takes a fancy towards, often grunting and turning his nose up when Obelix dotes over them or vice versa.

=== Getafix ===
Asterix and Getafix

Getafix is the village druid. In appearance, he is tall with a long white beard, hooked nose, white robe, red cloak. He is usually seen in possession of a small golden sickle. While his age is never stated, in the story of Asterix's birth (in which all but the oldest villagers are seen as small children), he appears unchanged. In Asterix and the Big Fight, the druid Psychoanalytix (who appears quite old) refers to him as his elder and teacher. In Asterix and Obelix's Birthday: The Golden Book, as a gag, Getafix at 50 years older appears to be frail and old, while in the other books, he appeared healthy.

Although known for his strength-enhancing magic potion, he has many other magical and medicinal potions at his disposal, including a potion to make hair grow quickly, a potion to counteract poison, one that neutralizes a drug that would kill in a matter of days, and a potion that restores a person to full health after injury (although this potion also causes the person who takes it to lose their recent memories while also interacting badly with the magic potion). Aside from making the potion, he also acts as the village doctor and occasional teacher. Asterix (and most other villagers) will consult him whenever anything strange occurs. He rarely engages himself in combat, one notable exception being The Great Divide where he is seen distributing slaps during a fight with the Romans, with obvious enjoyment.

As the only individual able to produce the "magic potion" upon which the villagers rely for their strength, he is the focus of many stories, ranging from the Romans attempting to put him out of commission in some manner to requesting that Asterix and Obelix help him find some missing ingredient, and the conscience of the village. On a few occasions, he has refused to make the potion when the villagers become too selfish, including in Asterix and Caesar's Gift, where he refused to provide the potion for anyone while the village was divided by an upcoming vote for a new chief, only to provide them with it once again when Vitalstatistix asked Getafix to provide the potion for Orthopedix, the man he had been running against for chief. He has also occasionally been taken prisoner by hostile forces to get access to the potion, only to be freed again thanks to Asterix and Obelix. The full recipe of the magic potion itself has never been revealed, but known ingredients are mistletoe (which must be cut with a golden sickle [Asterix and the Golden Sickle]), a whole lobster (an optional ingredient that improves the flavour), fresh fish, salt, and petroleum (called rock oil in the book), which is later replaced by beetroot juice. Replenishing the stores of ingredients for the magic potion has led to some adventures for Asterix and Obelix, including Asterix and the Great Crossing and Asterix and the Black Gold.

Getafix is very similar to many wise old men who act as mentors and father-figures to the heroes, such as Merlin or Gandalf. In the earlier books however, Getafix came across more as just a friend of the protagonists rather than a wise old counselor. He was also, from the very beginning, shown as a figure of fun as well as demonstrating a sense of humor.

== Major recurring characters ==
At the beginning of most of the Asterix books, immediately after the map of Gaul, and before the narrative starts, there is a standard description of the main characters above, as well as Getafix, Cacofonix and Vitalstatistix (regardless of their importance in that particular book).

The first appearance of all the major characters is in Asterix the Gaul unless otherwise noted.

=== Vitalstatistix ===
Chief Vitalstatistix is the chief of the Gaulish village. He is a middle-aged, big-bellied man with red hair, pigtails and a huge moustache. He is generally reasonable, well-informed, fearless, (comparatively) even-tempered and unambitious — the last much to the chagrin of his wife Impedimenta. His major failings are his love of good food and drink, and his pride. As a Gaulish chief, he prefers to travel on a shield, carried by two shield-bearers. A recurring joke throughout the series is him falling off the shield in many varied ways. The names of the shield-bearers are never mentioned.

Before becoming chief of the village, Vitalstatistix fought at the battle of Alesia, where Caesar almost completed his conquest of Gaul. In Asterix and the Chieftain's Shield, it was revealed that the shield on which he is carried originally belonged to the legendary Gaulish warrior chief Vercingetorix. His father was the village chief before him. He has a brother in Lutetia, Doublehelix, who has a young daughter and a son, Justforkix.

The introduction to each story states that Vitalstatistix has only one fear, "that the sky may fall on his head tomorrow"; however, he rarely alludes to this in an actual story, and then only as a rallying cry: "We have nothing to fear but ...". This characteristic is based on a real historical account where Gallic chieftains were asked by Alexander the Great what they were most afraid of in all the world, and replied that their worst fear was that the sky might fall on their heads.

While his role in some plots is minor, he is a central or pivotal character in books such as Asterix and the Big Fight, Asterix and the Chieftain's Shield, Asterix in Belgium, or Asterix and Caesar's Gift.

==== The Chief's shield-bearers ====
From Asterix and Caesar's Gift onwards, Vitalstatistix has had the same (unnamed) shield-bearers carry (and drop) him; prior to that, he had different bearers in each album. In Asterix in Switzerland, he fires both his shield-bearers after he tells them that it is a lovely day, and they look up, tipping the shield back and dropping the chief in the process. He then goes and hires new shield-bearers including Asterix, Geriatrix, Fulliautomatix and Obelix (in these cases the shield is horribly tilted, so he is forced to stand on a slant, and Obelix carried him with one hand like a waiter). The introduction page varies between showing the bearers straining under Vitalstatistix' not inconsiderable bulk as he looks into the distance in some of the books, while in others he looks at them in good humour as they look up to him in respect.

==== Impedimenta ====
First appearance: Asterix and the Big Fight (but not named until Asterix and the Chieftain's Shield).

Impedimenta is the matriarchal wife of chief Vitalstatistix, leader of the village wives (in her mind) and the best cook in the village. She is often disappointed with the other villagers, calling them barbarians, and wishes Vitalstatistix was more ambitious. Consequently, she zealously defends and flaunts every privilege due to her as first lady of the village, such as skipping the queue at the fishmonger's, often marked by the catchphrase "After all, I'm the chief's wife". She frequently says she wants to go back to Lutetia and live with her successful merchant brother, Homeopathix, whom her husband openly dislikes.

While usually presented in the books as a nag to her embarrassed husband, she has shown bravery and on occasion fought the Romans side by side with the men, typically using her rolling pin as a weapon. Her role as a heroic figure is most prominent in Asterix and Son, where she leads the women in protecting Caesarion, and in Asterix and the Secret Weapon, where she assumes the role of village chief after her husband is deposed.

Her name appears to derive either from the Latin military term impedimenta, meaning "baggage", or from the English word impediment, meaning obstruction or hindrance.

=== Cacofonix ===
Cacofonix is the village bard. He is usually only a supporting character, but has a major part in the plots of some albums (see Asterix and the Normans, Asterix the Gladiator, Asterix and the Magic Carpet, The Mansions of the Gods, and Asterix and the Secret Weapon). He loves singing and jumps at every opportunity to do so. While adept at playing his lyre and other instruments, and seen as a good teacher to the kids, his singing is absolutely atrocious, with other characters only able to stomach a few seconds before demanding he be silent. In later albums beginning with Magic Carpet, his music is so spectacularly horrible that it actually starts thunderstorms (even indoors), because of an old French saying that bad singing causes rain. For his part, Cacofonix considers himself a genius and a superb singer, and he is angrily offended when people criticize his singing, to the point of dismissing them as barbarians. In Asterix and the Normans, it is so unbearable that it teaches the ferocious Normans the meaning of fear.

Some villagers go to extreme lengths to avoid hearing Cacofonix's music. Most notably, Fulliautomatix, the village smith, strikes him on the head at the merest hint of breaking into a song. As a running gag, Cacofonix is generally tied up and gagged during the banquet at the end of most albums to allow the other villagers to have a good time without having to keep him from singing. He is nonetheless well-liked when not singing.

In contrast to the villagers, some of the younger generations whom Cacofonix has met do appreciate his "talent": Justforkix (in Asterix and the Normans) actually encouraged Cacofonix to think seriously about moving to Lutetia where he claimed the bard's way with music would be enjoyed. Similarly, the village youths express a liking for his unconventional music in Asterix and the Chieftain's Daughter. In Asterix and Caesar's Gift, it is revealed that he wrote "We Shall Overcome".

Unlike the other villagers, whose huts are on the ground, Cacofonix's hut is perched up in a tree. Ostensibly this is so that he can act as a lookout to warn the other villagers of imminent invasion, but the real reason is to let him practice his music as far from everyone as possible.

He and Getafix are the village's teachers, as only bards and druids are allowed to teach in school.

=== Geriatrix ===
First Appearance: Asterix the Gladiator but first named in Asterix at the Olympic Games

Geriatrix is the oldest inhabitant of Asterix's village: he is mentioned as 93 years old in Asterix at the Olympic Games (while drunk, he says he feels ten years younger, to which Asterix replies, "Well, that makes you 83, and it's time you were in bed"). Some translations make him no more than 80.

As an elder, Geriatrix demands respect (generally more than he is given). Nonetheless, he dislikes being treated as old and will attack anyone who comments to that effect.

Geriatrix is against foreigners who are not from his village. He is a veteran of the Battle of Gergovia and the Battle of Alesia, and refers to them when excited ("It'll be just like Gergovia all over!") or distraught ("It's just like Alesia all over again!"). He has an eye for the young ladies and has a very young and beautiful wife (who appears to be in her twenties) of whom he is very possessive — particularly when Obelix is around.

In prequels such as How Obelix Fell into the Magic Potion When he was a Little Boy, in which most of the characters are children and Vitalstatistix is a slim young man, Geriatrix, along with Getafix, is unchanged.

==== Mrs. Geriatrix ====
First Appearance: Asterix and the Roman Agent

Mrs. Geriatrix enjoys her husband's devotion and also her status as wife of the village's most senior inhabitant, which makes her one of the inner circle of village wives. Her youthful appearance suggests that she is less than half her husband's age; she is also a lot taller. She rules her home and marriage, and regularly tells her husband what to do even in direct contradiction of his own stated opinions. She appears to be in favour of women's rights, as shown in Asterix and the Secret Weapon. She eagerly accepted the radical changes in the village that occurred in this story. She and Impedimenta cause a gigantic fight in "Mini Midi Maxi".

She has never been officially named and is always referred to by the local title for wife and the translation of her husband's name. Albert Uderzo has stated she is partially based on his own wife and he wished to retain an air of mystery.

=== Unhygienix ===
First appearance: Asterix in Spain

Unhygienix is the village fishmonger, as was his father Unhealthix before him (as seen in Asterix and the Class Act). His fish do not come from the sea near the village even though he has a fishing boat; instead they are transported all the way from Lutetia (and from Massilia in the German translations) as he believes they are of finer quality. As a consequence, his fish consistently end up spoiled, causing them to smell horribly and make anyone who consumes it to suffer from food poisoning. He does not notice their smell, but most of the other villagers do and a lot of fights, which often escalate to involve most of the village, are caused by his stale fish, as when the blacksmith Fulliautomatix says: "Anyway, it [the fight] wouldn't have happened if they [the fish] were fresh!" and then Unhygenix slaps him with his fish. This rivalry is a family tradition — their fathers also fought, and their children are continuing it. Despite this, his catchphrase is a scream to his wife, "Bacteria! Get the fish inside!" or "Save the sales!", in fights on the village he doesn't want to enter (i.e. fights that are not about his fish), when villagers buy or steal his fish to fight with.

==== Bacteria ====
First appearance: Asterix in Spain

Bacteria is married to Unhygienix. She is one of the inner circle of village wives. She is quiet and easy-going, but doesn't hesitate to say exactly what she thinks. She helps her husband run his shop, selling fish of dubious quality, and is unperturbed by the bizarre uses to which they are sometimes put. They have two sons (one of whose names have not been mentioned) — Blinix in Asterix in Corsica, and the other with red hair in Asterix and the Secret Weapon. In Asterix and Obelix's Birthday: The Golden Book Blinix is seen having taken over the shop but rather than to import the fish from Lutetia, he gets the fish he sells from the nearby sea. This displeases his father who fears that the "good name of the shop will go to waste" that way.

==== Blinix ====
First appearance: Asterix in Corsica

Blinix is Bacteria's and Unhygienix's son. In Asterix and the Chieftain's Daughter, he helps Adrenalin run away.

=== Fulliautomatix ===
Fulliautomatix is the village smith. His father, Semiautomatix, was the village smith before him. He is tall and robust, and very strong — he is one of the strongest characters, perhaps second only to Obelix, and a bit of a ruffian, especially to Cacofonix. Fulliautomatix's first appearance was in the first volume, Asterix the Gaul, where the Roman spy was amazed that he used his fists to forge iron. However, he is subsequently shown using a normal hammer and is now rarely seen without one. A very different looking Fulliautomatix appeared in Asterix and the Banquet in which he and Obelix argue as to who should be entitled to punch the Roman that they are both engaged in hitting anyway.

Fulliautomatix often interacts with Unhygienix, the fishmonger, with whom he has a friendly rivalry. Fulliautomatix claims the fish he sells are stale, and this often results in Unhygienix throwing a fish at his face, causing a fight (sometimes the other villagers join in just for fun). Fulliautomatix also regularly bullies Cacofonix the bard, threatening him and hitting him on the head at the merest hint of breaking into song (these last being so bad that the other villagers do not object).

Fulliautomatix also has two unnamed children who have appeared in separate comics — a son with blond hair in Asterix in Corsica, and a daughter with blonde hair in Asterix and the Secret Weapon. In Asterix and the Great Divide he is shown as having an apprentice, though it is not specified if he's a relative; some speculate that he is the young son grown to teenage years, while in Asterix and the Chieftain's Daughter a young man resembling him is introduced as his eldest son, Selfipix. In Asterix and Obelix's Birthday: The Golden Book Fulliautomatix is seen as an elderly man with his now adult son having taken over the blacksmithing business; the scene begins with his son making steel dentures for Fulliautomatix, who has gone toothless over the years.

==== Mrs. Fulliautomatix ====
First appearance: Asterix and the Roman Agent

Mrs. Fulliautomatix is one of the inner circle of village wives. One of the shortest women in the village, and possessing of a steep and pointy nose, she takes no nonsense and dominates her much larger husband as well as getting into a brawl with the wife of Chief Vitalstatistix in Asterix and the Class Act. Although she appears often, she has never been named in the stories. She has been known to beat up Cacofonix on occasion as well, in Asterix and the Secret Weapon. She has a brother, as mentioned by her husband in Asterix and the Black Gold.

=== Julius Caesar ===
Julius Caesar (Jules César) is the Roman dictator and conqueror of Gaul. Many of the stories involve his schemes to finally conquer this last Gaulish village holding out against his legions, though he is reticent to admit that the village remains unoccupied. At other times, the village has (indirectly) come to his aid, but more often it is a major embarrassment to him in the Roman Senate — in at least one book, the entire senate is laughing at him after a failed plan. Despite this, Caesar is also shown to be a man of honour, since whenever Asterix and Obelix somehow end up helping Caesar, Caesar always grants them any favour they ask. He goes so far as to rebuild the entire Gaulish village when it was destroyed by Brutus who was trying to kidnap Cleopatra and Caesar's baby son, Caesarion, whom Asterix returned safely to his family (Asterix and Son). Although Caesar meets the various Gaulish villagers on several occasions, he occasionally forgets them and will only vaguely remember them. The appearance of Caesar is based on portraits found on ancient Roman coins.

=== The Pirates ===
Asterix parodies on the left, Barbe Rouge originals at right

In the course of their travels, Asterix and Obelix regularly cross paths with — and beat up — a group of pirates. The Gauls then proceed to sink their ship, causing the pirates severe financial difficulties. The pirates make their first appearance in the fourth album (Asterix the Gladiator), and feature in almost every subsequent album.

The main pirates are based on the Belgian comic series Barbe Rouge (1959 and continuing). The adventures of Barbe Rouge (Redbeard) and his son Eric were published in Pilote magazine, where Asterix's adventures were also published prior to appearing in book form. Although Barbe Rouge is a popular character in his own right in continental Europe, the popularity of Asterix's pirates is one of the few occasions when parody figures have overshadowed their originals.

Such is the fear that the pirates have for the Gauls that, having unknowingly taken them aboard—Asterix and his companions boarded the ship in the night when it was too dark for either side to see the other properly, with the pirates only learning the truth when they sneaked into their guests' cabin to rob them—they fled their own ship in the middle of the night while the subjects of their fear were sound asleep (Asterix in Corsica). Additionally, an "honorable suicide-sinking" has sometimes occurred in several Asterix adventures (Asterix and Cleopatra and The Magic Carpet), when the pirates themselves sink their own ship before the Gauls can get to them, reasoning that that would be the eventual outcome and doing it themselves would spare them a punch-up.

At other times, it is Asterix and Obelix who board the pirates' vessel and capture booty, thus reversing their roles of hunter and prey. This has happened mainly in the quest for food in an empty ocean (Asterix in Spain and The Great Crossing).

The main pirates are:

- Redbeard — captain of the pirates.
- Pegleg — an old pirate with a wooden leg who makes classical quotations in Latin.
- Baba — the African pirate in the crow's nest. He also has a cousin who is a gladiator (see Asterix and the Cauldron). In the original French and some other language versions he fails to pronounce the letters 'R' and 'L', leaving blanks in his speech. Early English translations also had him speaking something that resembled Jamaican Patois but this has been replaced by standard British English in re-editions, his manner of speaking no longer being a source of humour.
- Erix — the captain's son. Seen in Asterix and the Banquet, he is mentioned in Asterix and Cleopatra as being left as a deposit on a new ship.

In addition a number of members of the pirate crew are sight gags, some of whom have appeared on more than one occasion such as Frankenstein's monster and a Mongol warrior.

It should also be noted that in the films where the pirates are seen, Erix replaces Pegleg on the jetsam with Redbeard.

== Minor recurring characters ==
=== Historical figures ===
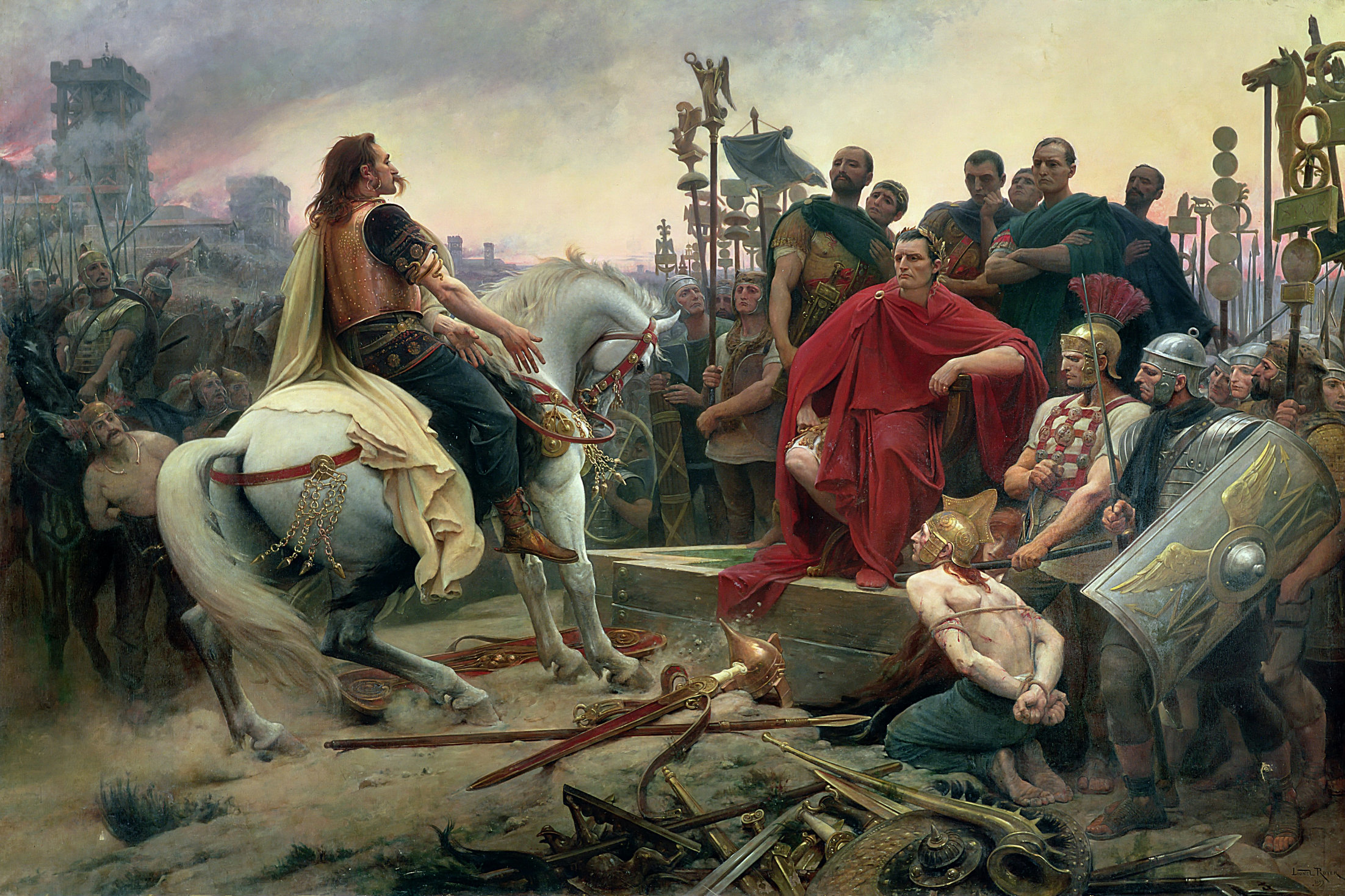
The surrender of Vercingetorix to Caesar, by Lionel-Noël Royer

- Queen Cleopatra – the Greek Queen of Egypt. She is a central character in Asterix and Cleopatra, where Asterix, Obelix and Getafix are asked for aid from an Egyptian architect to build a palace in three months, so Cleopatra can win a bet with Caesar. She also briefly appears in Asterix and Son and Asterix and Obelix All at Sea. In Asterix and Son, she has fairer skin and a shorter, differently shaped nose, while in All At Sea she has darker skin than her first appearance and the smaller nose of her second appearance. Her appearance in the comic is seemingly based on Elizabeth Taylor's screen depiction of the historical figure.
  Historical reference to Brutus (black-haired character) in The Twelve Tasks of Asterix animated film
- Brutus – Marcus Junius Brutus, depicted as Caesar's adopted son. Frequently plays with a knife, a reference to him being one of Caesar's assassins in real life. Caesar often uses the Shakespearean quote "Et tu, Brute?" to him for various purposes. Brutus appears in minor roles in several books, and has a major role in Asterix and Son, where he plots to kill Caesar and Cleopatra's infant son to secure his place as Caesar's heir. While Brutus is consistently depicted as dark-haired and physically robust, his appearance is arguably different in each of his appearances. He also briefly appears in the animated film The Twelve Tasks of Asterix, where he is depicted playing with his knife until he eventually hurts his own finger. Brutus is the main antagonist in the live action film Asterix at the Olympic Games, where he is a comical villain with no relation to his depiction in the comics.
- Pompey – Caesar's rival and a former consul of Rome. He is mentioned in Asterix the Gladiator, Asterix the Legionary, Asterix and the White Iris and Asterix and the Roman Agent and appears in person in Asterix and the Actress, where he is the book's antagonist.
- Metellus Scipio – Another of Caesar's rivals, allied to Pompey. Caesar defeated him in the Battle of Thapsus, as depicted in Asterix the Legionary. Note that Pompey does not make an appearance there, as he was assassinated before these events took place (though he anachronistically surfaces in Asterix and the Actress later).
- Caesarion – Caesar and Cleopatra's baby boy. Appears in Asterix and Son where he is sent to the village for safety. He drinks the magic potion twice, causing trouble for the villagers and the Romans sent to capture him.
- Vercingetorix – Arvernian chieftain, who is shown as a historical figure surrendering Gaul in various books by throwing his arms on the feet of Caesar, which comically hurt Caesar's feet. His shield is at the centre of Asterix and the Chieftain's Shield, and the plot of Asterix and the Chieftain's Daughter centers around his fictional daughter, Adrenalin.
- Cassivellaunus – British chieftain who resists the Roman invasion. Appears in Asterix in Britain.
- Titus Labienus – Roman general and de facto ruler of Lutetia, now known as Paris, in 52 B.C. Appears in Dogmatix and the Indomitables.
- Viriato - Lusitanian chieftain who resists the Romans. Appears in Asterix in Lusitania.

=== Villagers ===
- Copacetix – Vitalstatistix's father and the village's previous chief. His first appearance was in the miniseries, Asterix and Obelix: The Big Fight, where he substitutes for a younger, slimmer Vitalstatistix in the first episode's adaptation of How Obelix Fell into the Magic Potion When he was a Little Boy. He is portrayed as an optimistic and worriless leader, however he badly predicts future occurrences such as Caesar's rise to power. Throughout the miniseries, he repeatedly makes predictions which are immediately proven wrong.
- Monosyllabix and Polysyllabix – Villagers who appear together, first in Obelix and Co., where they appear on the cover. They also appear in Asterix in Belgium and Asterix and the Secret Weapon.
- Obese lady – another of Impedimenta's inner circle of village wives, but unlike the others, her husband is unknown. She is one of the village women having no name.
- Soporifix – father of Panacea who is mentioned in Asterix the Legionary, but not seen until Asterix and the Actress.
- Other villagers mentioned by name (and presumed to be recurring parts of crowd scenes):
  - Operatix, Acoustix, Harmonix, Polyfonix and Polytechnix in Asterix and the Normans
  - Pacifix, Atlantix, Baltix, Adriatix and Analgesix in Obelix and Co.
  - Bucolix and Photogenix in Asterix and Son, and briefly in Obelix and Co.
  - Tenansix in Asterix the Gaul – named for the old pre-1970s British monetary amount of 10 1/2 shillings (written as 10s6d or 10/6, spoken as 'ten and six'). Decimalisation of UK currency did not happen until early 1971, well after the first Asterix story was published.
  - Picanmix (Keskonrix), a youngster in Asterix the Gladiator. Named for the method of buying confectionery from sweet shops in Britain. Also appears in Asterix and Cleopatra.
  - Pectine, a young girl and skilled inventor, she is seen only in Asterix: The Secret of the Magic Potion.
  - Scarlatina in "For Gaul Lang Syne"
- Chanticleerix – the village's rooster. Has a crush on Vitalstatistix's helmet. Named after the rooster Chanticleer from the medieval fable Chanticleer and the Fox.

=== Gauls ===
- Postaldistrix – Postman. First appears in Asterix and the Normans, when he delivers a letter to Vitalstatistix. Also appears in Asterix the Legionary when he brings Tragicomix's letter to Panacea (see below), and the "Obelix: As Simple as ABC" short story, later included in Asterix and Obelix's Birthday: The Golden Book. Most recent appearance in Asterix and the Missing Scroll.
- Panacea – A beautiful young lady who is the daughter of Soporifix. She went to school and now lives in Condatum. Obelix has a crush on her. First appears in Asterix the Legionary; also "For Gaul Lang Syne", Asterix and Obelix All at Sea – although this is only a brief appearance – and Asterix and the Actress (although the majority of her appearances are that of an impersonator). She sends Obelix a letter and appears in Asterix and Obelix's Birthday: The Golden Book. Along with Tragicomix, she appears in the animated film Asterix Versus Caesar. The same couple appear in the live-action film Asterix and Obelix vs Caesar, played by Laetitia Casta and Hardy Krüger Jr. Belgian singer Angèle portrays Panacea in Asterix & Obelix: The Middle Kingdom.
- Tragicomix – Tall, handsome and muscular boyfriend – later husband – of Panacea. He runs a livery stable in Condatum. Appears in Asterix the Legionary and Asterix and the Actress. He has a golden-white body and blonde hair (but with no moustache, unlike almost all Gauls) and often appears bare-chested.
- Justforkix – Nephew of Vitalstatistix and a city boy from Lutetia. He is a major character in Asterix and the Normans in which he is sent to Vitalstatix's village by his father in order to get "toughened up", winds up being kidnapped by the Normans, and actually overcoming his fears. He also appears in the film adaptation Asterix and the Vikings as well as several Asterix game books and video games.
- Cassius Ceramix – The Gallo-Roman chief of Linoleum who collaborated with the Romans to compete in The Big Fight against Vitalstatistix for his leadership of his village, thus allowing Rome to rule over it. His name is a pun on Muhammad Ali's birth name, Cassius Clay, and like him is a skilled boxer.
- Orthopaedix – An innkeeper from Arausio who appears in Asterix and Caesar's Gift. He and his family move to the village after buying the deeds from Tremensdelirius (who had only been given the deeds by Caesar as a punishment). His wife Angina, after a major altercation with Impedimenta, pressures him into challenging Vitalstatistix for leadership. In the film Asterix and the Vikings his daughter Influenza (Zaza for short) can be seen when the villagers dance.
- Instantmix – Gaulish restaurant owner who helps Asterix and Obelix in Asterix the Gladiator. He later appears in Asterix in Corsica.
- Seniorservix – Sea captain from Gesoriacum who appears in Asterix and the Banquet and Asterix in Corsica. Seniorservix's name is a pun both on his age, and on the Senior Service tobacco traditionally popular among Royal Navy sailors.
- Homeopathix – Brother of Impedimenta and a successful merchant in Lutetia. He appears in Asterix and the Laurel Wreath and is mentioned in later albums as a figure she would like her husband to emulate (much to his disgust). He has a wife named Tapioca (Galantine).
- Prolix – A traveling soothsayer, he deceives most of the villagers except Asterix, and is proved a fraud by Getafix; appears in Asterix and the Soothsayer, the cartoon Asterix and the Big Fight and the live action film Asterix and Obelix vs Caesar.
- Asterix & Obelix's parents – They appear in Asterix and the Actress and short stories "Birth of Asterix" and "How Obelix Fell into the Magic Potion When he was a Little Boy". They are former villagers who now live in Condatum and run a "modernities" shop together.
  - Astronomix — Asterix's father
  - Sarsaparilla – Asterix's mother
  - Obeliscoidix – Obelix's father
  - Vanilla – Obelix's mother
- Whosmoralsarelastix – The chief of a neighbouring Gaulish village. He is a mean and greedy man who often does business with the Romans. Appears in Asterix and the Cauldron when he tries to trick the Gauls into paying his taxes for him, though by the end he has loses the money he regained.
- Adrenalin – Vercingetorix's teenage daughter, featured in Asterix and the Chieftain's Daughter, brought to the Gaulish village to hide her from the Romans who want to re-educate her as a Roman. Shrewd and rebellious, she is weary of her status as a symbol of rebellion.

=== Romans ===
- Gracchus Armisurplus – Centurion of Compendium for Asterix the Gladiator and Asterix and the Banquet; however his name is translated differently in each album (in Asterix and the Banquet he appears as Centurion Lotuseatus).
- Surplus Dairiprodus – The gluttonous prefect of Lutetia in Asterix and the Golden Sickle. He spends most of the time eating, and takes practically no interest in serious matters, even those that disturb order (such as Asterix and Obelix causing a fight).
- Gluteus Maximus – A Roman legionary chosen to represent Rome at the Olympics in Asterix at the Olympic Games.
- Tremensdelirius – An old, drunken Roman legionary veteran; he causes trouble in Asterix and Caesar's Gift and in Asterix and the Actress. He is the first "one-shot" background character to reappear in the series after a decade-long absence.
- Caius Fatuus – A gladiator trainer who is a major character in Asterix the Gladiator and is mentioned in Asterix and the Banquet
- Giveusabonus – A fat bald man with a big nose and whip who wears a leather kilt and fetish-style cross straps. He appears in Asterix and the Laurel Wreath, The Mansions of the Gods (as a slave driver) and in the film The 12 Tasks of Asterix.
- Ignoramus – Centurion sent to relieve Scrofulus' garrison in Obelix and Co. He also appears in Asterix in Corsica but looks slightly different.
- Crismus Bonus – A centurion who appears in Asterix the Gaul and Asterix and Obelix vs Caesar. In the animated version of Asterix the Gaul, he is named Phonus Balonus.
- Magnumopus – Appears in Asterix and the Roman Agent as a Roman legionary. He is very big and strong and misunderstands the meaning of psychological warfare; he does not use a pilum or a sword, but a club instead. His small head and helmet make the villagers think a small Roman attacked a villager.
- Infirmofpurpus – Appeared in Asterix and the Big Fight and the 1989 film adaptation as a Roman legionary. He is leading a Roman patrol when he is hit by a flying cauldron.
- Obsequius – Appears in Asterix in Spain, and speaks with a lisp after being punched by the commander-in-chief who has stolen magic potion from Asterix.
- Tortuous Convolvulus – Roman agent sent to stir up dissension among the Gauls, and succeeds in making the Gauls (and accidentally some of the Romans) think the Romans have the magic potion. Appears in Asterix and the Roman Agent and the live action film Asterix and Obelix vs Caesar.
- Centurions Dubius Status and Nefarious Purpus command the unit of Roman infantry which Asterix and Obelix join in Asterix the Legionary.
- Vexatius Sinusitus is a corruption-fighting Roman quaestor, whom Getafix cures of poisoning and who partakes in the Gaulish banquet, in Asterix in Switzerland.
- Vitriolix is Caesar's spy in Asterix the Legionary. In the videogame Asterix & Obelix XXL, Caesar fires him which leads him to assist Asterix and Obelix to rescue their friends from the Romans, he would later appear again in Mission: Las Vegum and The Olympic Games where he now calls himself "Sam Shieffer" (referencing Sam Fisher from the Splinter Cell games).
- Squareonthehypotenus appears in The Mansions of the Gods. He tries to make a natural park to help Caesar crush the indomitable Gauls. He reappears in Asterix and Obelix's Birthday: the Golden Book, but only to celebrate the party.
- Admiral Crustacius appears in Asterix and Obelix All at Sea. He attempts to use the magic potion to overthrow Caesar, but is turned to stone.
- Vice Admiral Nautilus appears in Asterix and Obelix All at Sea. Although he is an antagonist, it is hinted he does not have evil intentions.
- Caligula Minus appears in Asterix the Gaul. He is appointed by Crismus Bonus to spy on the Gauls to figure out their secret. He finds out about the potion, and tells Crismus Bonus when the Gauls find out that he is a Roman spy.
- Voluptuous Arteriosclerosus – Appears in Asterix and the Soothsayer. He is the centurion of the fortified Roman camp of Compendium. At the end of Asterix and the Soothsayer, he gets demoted from centurion to legionary, and his Optio, whom he used to be in charge of, instructs him to sweep the camp. He also appears on the final 2-page spread of Asterix and Obelix's Birthday: The Golden Book.
- Prospectus, Tomcrus, Pestiferus and Fastidius – The royal senators of Julius Caesar who conduct with his plans to conquer the Gaul village, they only appear in the animated films Asterix: The Mansions of the Gods and The Secret of the Magic Potion.
- Centurion Somniferus – One of Caesar's centurions who tirelessly tries to invade the Gaul village, he is often accompanied by two bumbling legionaries named Tofungus and Humerus. they only appear in the animated films Asterix: The Mansions of the Gods and The Secret of the Magic Potion.
- Anonymus, Dulcia and Mischiefus – A Roman family who came to live at the Mansions Of The Gods after winning a lottery, they eventually help the Gauls to get rid of the Romans and demolish the mansions.
- Metadata – A Roman scribe and young niece of centurion Fastanfurius, she is shown to admire the Gaul's culture and believes in what is right for the Roman empire, to the point of helping the Gaul villagers to stop Caesar from destroying their home. She only appears in the Netflix mini-series Asterix and Obelix: The Big Fight.
- Fastanfurius – Metadata's warmongering centurion uncle who seeks to eliminate the Gauls and destroy their village, he is accompanied by fellow centurion Potus. They only appear in the Netflix mini-series Asterix and Obelix: The Big Fight.

=== Others ===
- Anticlimax – Asterix's first cousin, once removed. He lives in a British village holding out against the Romans in Asterix in Britain (he appears on the cover). He also appears in Asterix in Corsica and has a nephew who is an escaped galley slave in Asterix and Obelix All at Sea.
- Macaroon – Tattooed Pictish warrior found on the beach frozen in a block of ice. His first name is Crk, because this is the sound his fist makes when punching someone. Asterix and Obelix escort him home in Asterix and the Picts. He has a problem with speaking originally which is what Getafix calls a 'tummy rumble'.
- Camomilla – Daughter of the Pictish chief and fiancée of Macaroon.
- McVicar – Chief of a rival Pictish tribe and ally of the Romans. His clan can be distinguished from Macaroon's, because they wear red and black rather than yellow and green kilts.
- Mykingdomforanos, McAnix and O'veroptimistix – British chieftains representing England, Scotland and Ireland respectively who appear in Asterix in Britain and Asterix in Corsica.
- Petitsuix – Swiss innkeeper who appears in Asterix in Switzerland and Asterix in Corsica. His name is a pun on petit suisse, a French cheese.
- Pepe – Young spoiled son of the chief of an Iberian village holding out against the Romans; he appears on the cover of Asterix in Spain in which he is taken hostage by Caesar, but rescued and returned by Asterix and Obelix. He makes life difficult for the Gauls as well as for the Romans, though even Obelix is upset when they finally part. He is one of the few people who like Cacofonix's music, and also has a soft spot for Dogmatix. He visits the village again in Asterix in Corsica.
- Ekonomikrisis – a Phoenician merchant who appears in Asterix the Gladiator and also Asterix and the Black Gold (helping Asterix and Obelix travel to and from Rome and Tyre respectively), and in Asterix and the Chieftain's Daughter and Asterix in Lusitania. He also appeared in the animated adaptation of Asterix In Britain, but not by name.
- Edifis – an Egyptian architect and old friend of Getafix. His personality is extended in the movie Asterix & Obelix: Mission Cleopatra by making him not only younger but much more eccentric. This version appears with a small role in the movie Asterix at the Olympic Games.
- Olaf Timandahaf – Viking chieftain who kidnaps Justforkix in Asterix and the Normans. In the film adaption, he has a wife named Vikea and a daughter named Abba who ends up as Justforkix's wife.
- Demonix – A evil pyrokinetic druid and rival of Getafix who seeks to make his magic potion for himself and destroy both the Gauls and Romans. He is seen only in Asterix: The Secret of the Magic Potion.
- Cakemix, Atmospherix and Phantasmagorix – Members of the Grand Council of Druids, they are only seen in Asterix: The Secret of the Magic Potion.
- Cholerix – A druid apprentice who Demonix tricks into creating Getafix's magic potion. He only appears in Asterix: The Secret of the Magic Potion.
- Apothika – A female goth druid hypnotist (and part-time therapist) who lives in a swamp and is a close friend of Getafix, She only appears in the Netflix mini-series Asterix and Obelix: The Big Fight.
- Blackangus and Annabarbera – Two sports commentators for The Big Fight, they only appear in the Netflix mini-series Asterix and Obelix: The Big Fight.

== Caricatures ==
- Alain Prost – Appears as Coronavirus, the Roman champion chariot driver in Asterix and the Chariot Race.
- Annie Cordy – Belgian actress who is caricatured as chief Beefix's wife Bonanza in Asterix in Belgium.
- Arnold Schwarzenegger — was the inspiration for the super-clones in Asterix and the Falling Sky.
- Benito Mussolini – As the centurion Nebulus Nimbus in Asterix and the Big Fight. Like the real Mussolini he is bald, fat, and shouts all the time.
- Boadicea – Appears in Asterix in Britain as a housewife. She confronts Asterix, Obelix and Anticlimax after they mistakenly break down her door.
- Charles Aznavour – as a singing pirate in Asterix and the Chieftain's Daughter and Asterix and the Griffin.
- Charles Laughton – as the villainous prefect Surplus Dairiprodus in Asterix and the Golden Sickle.
- Charlton Heston (as Ben-Hur) can be seen arguing with another driver in Asterix and the Golden Sickle.
- Cartoon characters – Hoodunnit from Asterix and the Magic Carpet is the cousin of Iznogoud, another cartoon character created by Goscinny. In Asterix and the Falling Sky the alien Toon resembles a purple Mickey Mouse. His home planet (Tadsilweny) is an anagram of Walt Disney.
- Eddy Merckx – as a messenger in Asterix in Belgium.
- Goscinny and Uderzo have cameo appearances in many books including Asterix in Britain, Obelix and Co. and Asterix and the Missing Scroll.
- Mahatma Gandhi – As Watzisnehm the fakir in Asterix and the Magic Carpet.
- Guy Lux – As a game show host in The Mansions of the Gods.
- Jacques Chirac – The economist who buys Obelix's menhirs in Obelix and Co.
- Jean Graton – As a driver in "the great ox-cart race, the Suindinum 24 hours" (in later translations "The Suindinum 500") in Asterix and the Golden Sickle.
- Jean Richard – As a lion tamer in Asterix and the Laurel Wreath.
- Julian Assange – As Confoundtheirpolitix, a publisher of Caesar's secrets in Asterix and the Missing Scroll.
- Kirk Douglas – in "Asterix and Obelix All at Sea" as Spartakis the Greek, leader of a multi-national, multi-cultural band of mutinous slaves who have escaped after commandeering Caesar's personal galley.
- Laurent Terzieff – As an avant-garde theater director in Asterix and the Cauldron. The English translation renames the character Laurensolivius while another actor of his troupe is renamed Alecguinnus (references to Laurence Olivier and Alec Guinness, respectively).
- Lino Ventura – Appears as the centurion in Asterix and the Roman Agent.
- Luciano Pavarotti – Appears as an innkeeper in Asterix and the Chariot Race.
- Napoleon – as the Corsican chief Boneywasawarriorwayayix (Ocatarinetabellatchitchix in the original French). Alternatively, this may also be a caricature of Ricardo Montalbán. Also appears in Asterix and the Big Fight (differently) as one of Psychoanalytix's patients.
- Otto von Bismarck – As the Goth chieftain Metric in Asterix and the Goths.
- Peter Ustinov – As Poisonus Fungus, the Prefect of Lugdunum in Asterix and the Banquet.
- Pierre Tchernia – Pierre Tchernia has made various cameos throughout the books, always as a Roman legionary. He first appears in Asterix the Legionary as one of the generals discussing tactics with Caesar, then Asterix in Corsica as Centurion Hippopotamus, the commanding officer of Totorum. Later, he appears in Obelix & Co. as a drunk legionary who has to be carried out of the forfeited camp by caricatures of Goscinny and Uderzo. He appears again as a legionary in Asterix and Caesar's Gift and Asterix in Belgium.
- Jean Gabin – Appears as the Roman governor of Judaea Pontius Pilate (called Pontius Pirate in the comics) in Asterix and the Black Gold. In reality the historical Pontius Pilate was not even born at the time Asterix is set.
- Raimu – As a bartender in Asterix and the Banquet.
- Ricky Gervais - As Centurion Extraneus in Asterix in Lusitania
- Sean Connery – As the spy Dubbelosix (an obvious parody of James Bond) in Asterix and the Black Gold.
- Sigmund Freud – As Psychoanalytix the druid in Asterix and the Big Fight. He runs a mental health clinic with patients including a shy barbarian, a man who thinks he is a wild boar, and Napoleon Bonaparte.
- Silvio Berlusconi – Appears as the owner of a garum business in Asterix and the Chariot Race and Asterix in Lusitania
- Stan Laurel and Oliver Hardy – As legionaries in Obelix and Co.
- Sylvie Uderzo – As Orthopaedix's young daughter Influenza in Asterix and Caesar's Gift.
- Tintin – Gastronomix the Belgian has Tintin's haircut in Asterix the Legionary.
- Thomson and Thompson – Identical twin detectives from The Adventures of Tintin. They appear in Asterix in Belgium.
- Harold Wilson (with a red wig and moustache) appears in Asterix in Britain as the chieftain Mykingdomforanos. Also there is a character in Asterix and the Great Crossing, known as Håråldwilssen.
- Tibet aka Gilbert Gascard – as the Roman Quaestor Vexatius Sinusitus in Asterix in Switzerland.
- The volume, Asterix and the Missing Scroll has several caricatures. Caesar's publisher Libellus Blockbustus resembles French advertising magnate Jacques Seguela. Film director Alfred Hitchcock is caricatured as an unnamed falconer among the entourage of Libellus Blockbustus. French actor Jean Reno appears as a soldier in Libellus Blockbustus's special unit tasked to retrieve the scroll. French journalist Franz-Olivier Giesbert is caricatured as the white-haired critic of Mundus. The newsmonger character Confoundtheirpolitix was inspired by and resembles Julian Assange.
- Various pop stars – The Beatles appear in Asterix in Britain while the Rolling Menhirs and Elvis Preslix are mentioned in Asterix and the Normans. In addition, Cacofonix's hairstyle is based on Elvis's.
