= Asterix and the Secret Weapon =

Comic book album

Asterix and the Secret Weapon (La Rose et le Glaive)
- Date: 1991
- Series: Asterix

Creative team
- Writers: Albert Uderzo
- Artists: Albert Uderzo

Original publication
- Date of publication: 1991
- Language: French

Chronology
- Preceded by: Asterix and the Magic Carpet
- Followed by: Asterix and Obelix All at Sea

Asterix and the Secret Weapon is the twenty-ninth volume of the Asterix comic book series and the fifth by Albert Uderzo alone. It parodies feminism, gender equality/relationships, and military secrets.

== Plot summary ==
A female bard named Bravura is being hired by the women of the village, who think that Cacofonix is giving their children a poor education. Upon hearing this, Cacofonix secludes himself in the forest nearby. When Bravura arrives, the women are stunned by her singing and the men laugh at it; much to her annoyance. Over the next few days, Bravura exhorts Impedimenta (and later other village women) to resist the authority of their husbands. Impedimenta then quarrels with Vitalstatistix, who joins Cacofonix in the forest. Impedimenta is then made chief by the women, while the men do not dare vote against their wives.

Meanwhile, Julius Caesar, to take over the village, sends his agent Manlius Claphamomnibus, with orders to bring the "secret weapon" over the ocean discreetly. At the village, Bravura's reforms spread discord among all the locals. Asterix, troubled by all of this from the start, is approached by Bravura, who offers to marry him and assume joint chieftainship; whereupon Asterix accuses her of coming to the village to seize power. When she kisses him, Asterix hits her reflexively, but feels shame and regret immediately after. For striking a woman, Impedimenta expels Asterix from the village; when Getafix objects to this, Bravura insults him. Immediately, Getafix and the other village men join Vitalstatistix in the forest.

Claphamomnibus's ship lands at Gaul, and he reveals the secret weapon: female legionaries, whom the Gaulish men would refuse to fight for fear of being dishonored. Asterix, when he learns of this, is sent to warn the village women of the threat. Bravura suggests making peace, and goes to meet the female legionaries herself. However, she is refused, and Claphamomnibus insults her. At this, Asterix approaches Bravura with a plan. His initial step is to have Cacofonix sing onomatopoeia in the forest, causing rain and scaring all animals (in one scene exposing a dragon), which in turn terrifies the female Roman scout parties and delays their assault. When the Roman women eventually attack the village, they find that Bravura has converted the village into a shopping mall where the women can buy clothes and get their hair and makeup done. In the meantime, the men of the village defeat the male soldiers stationed around the village; and finally, Cacofonix sings again to expel the women. Julius Caesar is made the laughing stock of Rome, and Bravura leaves for Lutetia, reconciled with Asterix.

== Commentary ==
- The original French title is La Rose et le Glaive (The Rose and the Sword). The word glaive in French is used to designate both a Roman gladius and a long spear with a shaped blade on the end, though the cover design shows a sword. The French title may refer to 1953 film "The Sword and the Rose", and possibly also Paul Verhoeven's gruesome medieval film "Flesh & Blood" (1985) which is also known as "The Rose and the Sword".
- The name of the Roman official, Manlius Claphamomnibus, is a pun on the English expression "the man on the Clapham omnibus"—a legal term for a reasonably educated and intelligent but non-specialist person, an everyday person against whom a defendant's conduct might be judged in a court of law.
- Cacofonix at last gets to beat up Fulliautomatix (instead of vice versa), and for the second time since Asterix and the Magic Carpet the Bard is seen inflicting violence.
- It borrows plot elements and visual gags from a large number of previous albums, including:
  - Sending Obelix back to school from Asterix and the Class Act
  - Bard sweeping old musical notes out of the tree house (which fall on passersby below) from Asterix and the Goths
  - Using female legionaries to defeat the chivalrous Gauls from Asterix as you've never seen him
  - Animals fleeing the bard's song: we see the same scene as in Asterix and the Normans including a turtle running on its hind legs
  - Cacofonix's singing causes rain as in Asterix and the Magic Carpet.
  - The village children (with conflict between Unhygenix' and Fulliautomatix') from Asterix in Corsica
  - An outsider causing an election to replace the chief from Asterix and Caesar's Gift
- This is the second album in which Asterix is exiled, the first being Asterix and the Cauldron.
- In Dutch the title "The Secret Weapon" would translate to "Het Geheime Wapen" which is actually the Dutch title for Asterix and the Falling Sky
- When Cacofonix leaves the village, he quotes one of Nero's famous last words, "Qualis artifex pereo" ("What an artist dies with me"). This precedes Nero's citation before his suicide by 118 years.

== In other languages ==
- Ancient Greek: Μεταξύ ρόδου και ξίφους
- Catalan: La rosa i l'espasa
- Cretan Greek: Σπαθί και τριαντάφυλλο
- Croatian: Ruža i mač
- Czech: Růže a meč
- Danish: Rosen og Svaerdet
- Dutch: De roos en het zwaard
- Finnish: Ruusu ja Miekka (also translated into the Karelian dialect under the name Kallija tyttölöi (roughly translatable as Girls of Gaul))
- French: La Rose et le Glaive
- Ghent (dialect): De Ruuze en het Zweerd
- German: Asterix und Maestria
- Greek: Ρόδο και ξίφος
- Italian: La Rosa e il Gladio
- Indonesian: "Mawar dan Pedang Bermata Dua"
- Norwegian: Damenes Inntogsmarsj, translates "The Women Marching In"
- Portuguese: A Rosa e o Gládio
- Polish: Róża i miecz
- Pontic Greek: Σπαθιά και τριαντάφυλλα
- Serbian: Ружа и мач/Ruža i mač
- Spanish: Astérix, la rosa y la espada
- Swedish: Rosen och svärdet
