= Asterix and Obelix's Birthday =

2009 French comic book

Asterix and Obelix's Birthday: The Golden Book (L'Anniversaire d'Astérix et Obélix - Le Livre d'or)
- Series: Asterix

Creative team
- Writers: Albert Uderzo
- Artists: Albert Uderzo

Original publication
- Date of publication: October 2009
- Language: French

Chronology
- Preceded by: Asterix and the Falling Sky
- Followed by: Asterix and the Picts

Asterix and Obelix's Birthday: The Golden Book is the thirty-fourth album of the Asterix comic book series, designed and written by Albert Uderzo. The book also includes Asterix stories which were created jointly with René Goscinny. The album, which celebrates the 50th anniversary of the creation of the series, was released on 22 October 2009.

The album begins with a preface where Uderzo replies to the critics of his solo work, especially for the previous album, Asterix and the Falling Sky. He also says The Golden Book is not a whole story, but a succession of short stories celebrating the 50th anniversary of the hero. This was the final volume produced by Uderzo before handing over the series to a new creative team.

== Plot summary ==
The story begins in the year 1 AD, fifty years after 50 BC, when all the other books are set. The characters are introduced, but aged fifty years. Some craftsmen, tradesmen or Gallic warriors already have children or grandchildren. Uderzo appears in the strip and has a joke at the Gauls' expense, leading Obelix to hit him. Uderzo then decides that aging the Gauls 50 years was not such a good idea.

Back in 50 BC, in the same village in which the birthdays of Asterix and Obelix, which happen to be the same day, are celebrated. Asterix and Obelix receive letters from their friends (Panacea, the pirates, and Edifis among others). Obelix can't read Panacea's letter, so he gets an old alphabet book from Getafix. However, he is still unable to understand what the letter says until Asterix finally helps him. Obelix, in his anger, then throws the alphabet book at Getafix. Then Geriatrix, jealous of the two Gauls, criticizes them and makes a rather negative description using a Magnetic resonance imaging picture.

At a great feast, many recurring or important characters of the adventures of Asterix, from all nationalities, appear. Each one of them offers his gift to the heroes (Ekonomikrisis offers a guide Coquelus, Cacofonix his sheet music, Valueaddedtax new magic potions ...) They also make some proposals for the future (clothes changing, marriage, amusement park, theater, art visual, etc., which are shown to the Gauls).

Finally, Cleopatra and Julius Caesar arrive. Caesar is initially reluctant to come to the birthday party. However, he yields to the wishes of his lady after she reminds him of the protection Asterix and Obelix gave to Caesarion (Asterix and Son). Nevertheless, Caesar, being a bad loser, decides to offer the Gauls a jar of wine laced with Ricin, entrusting the mission to a group of centurions. However, Getafix outsmarts the Romans by proposing a toast to Caesar's health and then secretly tossing the contents of his glass over his shoulder. The centurions drink with enthusiasm and are then plagued with severe gastrointestinal distress for the remainder of the story.

== Notes ==
- There are over 80 characters in this album, making it the one with the most characters in the whole series.
- This album includes characters from many past volumes, including characters without names (those seen only in passing). As well as main characters, there are female legionaries, a drunken prisoner, the children of the village, and the chicken in love with the feathers on Vitalstatistix's helmet. Also, former bad guys including several centurions, notable legionaries, and Julius Caesar in person are all present. Gaulish traitors such as Clovogarlix from Asterix and the Golden Sickle, Prolix from Asterix and the Soothsayer, and Codfix from Asterix and the Great Divide are also present. The characters and subjects (scenes, places, and objects) present in the book make up a mix of elements, creating a "best of" the 33 preceding albums.
- This album reuses drawings from publicity materials, annex publications to the series, and preceding albums. For example, the study of character proportions of Asterix on page 17 is from The Twelve Tasks of Asterix.
- The captain of the pirates, Redbeard, is finally named in this album. He is not named in any of the preceding albums.
- Except for potential spouses, children, and grandchildren of Asterix and Obelix, Caesar's pharmacist Choleramorbus is the only previously unpublished character in the album.
- On the final 2-page spread, one character appears twice. He is Voluptuous Arteriosclerosus, the former centurion from the Roman camp Compendium seen in the album Asterix and the Soothsayer. He appears in the upper-right as a centurion clapping Prolix on the back, and in the lower-left as the demoted legionary he is at the end of Asterix and the Soothsayer sweeping under the supervision of his Optio (who he used to be in charge of).
- Except for most of the short stories in Asterix and the Class Act, this is the first time that an album does not end with a banquet, even though we can predict that there will be one later on to celebrate the birthday of Asterix and Obelix.
