= Asterix and Obelix All at Sea =

Comic book album

Asterix and Obelix All At Sea (La Galère d'Obélix)
- Date: 1996
- Series: Asterix

Creative team
- Writers: Albert Uderzo
- Artists: Albert Uderzo

Original publication
- Date of publication: 1996
- Language: French

Chronology
- Preceded by: Asterix and the Secret Weapon
- Followed by: Asterix and the Actress

Asterix and Obelix All at Sea (French: La Galère d'Obélix, "Obelix's galley [ship]") is the thirtieth volume of the Asterix comic book series, by Albert Uderzo. The album was dedicated to Uderzo's grandchild, as well as to the American actor Kirk Douglas.

== Plot summary ==
A band of slaves led by Spartakus (a parody of Spartacus) has taken over Julius Caesar's personal galley, prompting Caesar to send his Admiral Crustacius, whom he frequently berates as the “Silliest Sausage in Rome”, to recover the vessel.

After some arguing about a safe place to disembark, the slaves set sail for the only place safe from the Romans: the village of indomitable Gauls. The four outlying Roman camps rehearse a parade to welcome Crustacius, who is pursuing the slaves. Believing the Romans are about to attack, the Gauls prepare for battle. Obelix is (as usual) denied Getafix's magic potion and sulks off. When Asterix asks Getafix why he denies Obelix a serving, Getafix replies that too much of the potion may incur side effects beyond his knowledge. As the Gauls return victorious, with Asterix personally beating up Crustacius’ adjutant Vice-Admiral Nautilus who was in charge, they find Obelix had snuck away and drunk an entire second cauldron of magic potion, turning him into granite.

The former galley slaves are granted refuge, while Getafix tries to revive Obelix. Ultimately Obelix returns to life, but as a child and deprived of his usual strength. He is kidnapped by Roman soldiers and put on a ship bound for Rome, where Crustacius intends to use him as a bargaining counter for the return of Caesar's galley. Asterix, Dogmatix, Getafix and the former slaves set out in pursuit and rescue Obelix at sea. Crustacius and Nautilus, as well as Caesar's galley, are handed over to the pirates, who plan to ransom them to Caesar. Spartakis and his crew take the Gauls to Atlantis (the Canary Islands), but the Atlanteans, despite having the secret of eternal youth, cannot restore Obelix's adulthood. The Gauls head homeward, while the freed slaves remain on Atlantis as children forever.

On Caesar's galley, the pirates unwittingly give Crustacius a dose of magic potion from a barrel inadvertently left behind by Getafix. He expels the pirates and plans on using his new strength to usurp Caesar; however, he makes the same mistake as Obelix and becomes a statue. Nautilus's ambition of obtaining a promotion for bringing back the galley is dashed when he forgets to remove the Jolly Roger flag upon approaching Rome's harbour and the vessel is attacked and sinks.

On their way back, the Gauls are intercepted by another Roman galley and Asterix is knocked unconscious by a catapult stone. Seeing his friend about to be thrown to the sharks, Obelix recovers his strength and size, and rescues him. Obelix then propels the galley into the Roman camp of Aquarium, before returning to the village for a feast. Crustacius’ petrified corpse is installed in the Circus Maximus, while Nautilus and his crew are reduced to sweeping the arena. Asked by Cleopatra why he has “erected” a statue to commemorate his incompetent admiral, Caesar replies that although lions do not eat granite, things may change some day.

== Notes ==
- The character Spartakis is based on actor Kirk Douglas and his role in the movie Spartacus.
- This is the only album in which two of the pirates are called by their names.
- The Atlantean palace in the album has been modeled after the ruins of the Minoan civilization. Connections between Atlantis and Minoan Crete have also been explored in Atlantis Mystery, Indiana Jones and the Fate of Atlantis, and other fiction.
- The young Obelix lacks his usual great strength. This means he must be under six years old, as he was about that age when he fell into the potion and gained his strength (see How Obelix Fell into the Magic Potion When he was a Little Boy).
- This album has perhaps the closest thing in the Asterix series to a character actually dying, as Admiral Crustacius is left trapped in stone form at the end of the story, without Getafix to revert him to normal.
- Cleopatra appears in this album alongside Julius Caesar; but her physical appearance is quite different from that seen in the album Asterix and Cleopatra, in that she is here darker-skinned and shorter-nosed, and is never shown in her characteristic irascibility.
- The young Obelix here pronounces the name of Asterix properly; but lisps in How Obelix Fell into the Magic Potion When he was a Little Boy.
- One of the slaves in Spartakis' group claims that he's the nephew of Anticlimax, the first cousin once removed of Asterix from Asterix in Britain.
- The villagers mistaking the large mass of Romans for an attack on the village (which leads to Obelix sneaking a dose of magic potion for himself) is similar to what happened in How Obelix Fell into the Magic Potion When he was a Little Boy, only in that story, the Romans had come to offer a truce, but made the mistake of coming in large forces instead of sending a representative with a small escort (only revealing their intentions after losing the battle they never intended to make in the first place).

== In other languages ==
- Croatian: Gali na galiji (Gauls on galley)
- Czech: Obelix a Caesarova galéra
- Danish: Så til søs, Obelix!
- Dutch: De beproeving van Obelix
- Finnish: Obelixin kaleeri (also translated into Savo dialect as Opeliksin orjalaeva, roughly translatable as Obelix's Slave Ship)
- German: Obelix auf Kreuzfahrt
- Spanish: El mal trago de Obelix
- Greek: Η γαλέρα του Οβελίξ
- Hebrew: ילדותו השנייה של אובליקס (Obelix's Second Childhood)
- Italian: Asterix e la galera di Obelix
- Indonesian: "Obelix Yang Malang"
- Latin: "Navis actuaria Obeligis"
- Norwegian: Obelix på galleien
- Portuguese: A Galera de Obelix (Brazil) O Pesadelo de Obelix (Portugal)
- Polish: Galera Obeliksa
- Serbian: Obeliksove nevolje (Obelix' Troubles)
- Swedish: Obelix på galejan

== See also ==
- Felix, qui potuit rerum cognoscere causas (originally from Virgil, quoted by the pirate captain on page 41 of the English edition of this book)
- English translations of Asterix
- Atlantis in comics
