= Asterix and the Actress =

Comic book album

Asterix and the Actress (Astérix et Latraviata)
- Date: 2001
- Series: Asterix

Creative team
- Writers: Albert Uderzo
- Penciller: Albert Uderzo
- Inker: Frederic Mebarki
- Letterer: Michel Janvier
- Colorist: Thierry Mebarki

Original publication
- Date of publication: 14 March 2001
- Language: French

Chronology
- Preceded by: Asterix and Obelix All at Sea
- Followed by: Asterix and the Class Act

Asterix and the Actress (French: Astérix et Latraviata, "Asterix and Latraviata") is the 31st volume of the Asterix comic book series, written and illustrated by Albert Uderzo.

== Plot summary ==
Asterix and Obelix receive a surprise birthday visit from their mothers, who have come from Condatum, bringing a Roman sword and helmet as presents. The mothers soon fuss over why their sons are still unmarried. Their efforts to find matrimonial matches for them go unappreciated.

Meanwhile, Asterix and Obelix's fathers, who run a "modernities" store in Condatum, are arrested because an alcoholic veteran legionary, Tremensdelirius from Asterix and Caesar's Gift, had sold them the sword and helmet of Caesar's rival Pompey, who now wants them back, but the two items were gifted to Asterix and Obelix. Pompey sends a gifted actress, Latraviata, disguised as Panacea, Obelix's love interest and escorted by a Roman agent, Fastandfurious, to infiltrate the Gaulish village and retrieve Pompey's belongings.

The real Panacea and her husband Tragicomix, upon learning that Asterix and Obelix's fathers have been imprisoned by Pompey, set out for the Gaulish village to alert their friends. On their way, they run into Latraviata and Fastandfurious, who have left the village with Pompey's sword and helmet, and the subterfuge is exposed. Asterix and Obelix catch up with them, and Fastandfurious is hit with a menhir, whose impact causes him to lose his memory. Asterix and Obelix then go to Condatum to free their fathers, while Tragicomix apprehends Pompey and hands him over to Caesar. Caesar presents a statue of himself to Asterix, who hands it over to Latraviata for her outstanding acting performance, resulting in a joke about the first César Award.

== Notes ==
- This is the first appearance of Asterix and Obelix's parents in the mainstream comic line.
- When Asterix and Obelix's fathers warn Bogus Genius of their sons' retribution, a legionary whispers that "it's a little quirk of theirs ... they're always quoting from that play, Waiting for Godotrix", a reference to Samuel Beckett's tragicomedy, Waiting for Godot. This allusion does not appear in the original French version, which instead uses a biblical allusion, with the legionary saying, "It's an obsession with them, they talk about their sons as if they were waiting for the Messiah."
- The award Latraviata receives parodies a César Award given by the French Académie des Arts et Techniques du Cinema (hence a golden Caesar). The first César Award for Best Actress was given to Romy Schneider in 1976 (who resembles Latraviata unmasked).
- At one point in the story, an angry Obelix punches Asterix, the first time he has done so (though Asterix later repays the favour while in a hyperactive stupor, having been given some of the magic potion while concussed).
- During the book, Dogmatix finds a mate and sires puppies, putting him way ahead of Obelix and Asterix in starting a family.
- In this book, Asterix and Obelix share the same birthday. However, in the book Obelix and Co. and the live-action movie Asterix and Obelix vs. Caesar, Obelix does not share a birthday with Asterix. This coincides with the retcon introduced in the short story Birth of Asterix, which was published in 1994, nearly 20 years after Obelix and Co., but seven years prior to Asterix and the Actress.
- The souvenir store run by Asterix and Obelix's fathers is called "Modernities & Collectibles" (as opposed to Antiques).
- On page 33, "Romans Go Home" is scrawled on a pillar outside the tavern in Condatum, a reference to the same graffiti in Monty Python's Life of Brian.
- Some fans have suggested the name of the agent Fastandfurius (Pincodus in French) is a reference to the film series Fast & Furious, although the first film in that franchise was not released until June 2001, three months after the English release of Asterix and the Actress.
- Latraviata's name is a reference to the opera La traviata by Giuseppe Verdi.
- Asterix and the Actress was France's best-selling comic book of 2001, selling 2,288,065 copies.
- Uderzo released a special edition of the album called Astérix et Latraviata — L'album des crayonnés (Asterix and the Actress — The Album of Preparatory Work) (2001) to show the production stages from sketching to scanning, printing, inking and coloring.

== In other languages ==
- Catalan: Astèrix i Latraviata
- Croatian: Asterix i Latravijata
- Czech: Asterix a Latraviata
- Dutch: Asterix en Latraviata
- Finnish: Asterix ja Latraviata
- Galician: Astérix e Latraviata
- German: Asterix und Latraviata
- Greek: Ο Αστερίξ και η Λατραβιάτα
- Italian: Asterix e Latraviata
- Norwegian: Asterix og Latraviata
- Polish: Asteriks i Latraviata
- Portuguese: Astérix e Latraviata
- Serbian: Астерикс и Латравијата/Asteriks i Latravijata
- Spanish: Astérix y Latraviata
- Swedish: Asterix och Latraviata
