= The Mansions of the Gods =

Comic book album

The Mansions of the Gods (Le Domaine des Dieux)
- Date: 1973
- Series: Asterix

Creative team
- Writers: Rene Goscinny
- Artists: Albert Uderzo

Original publication
- Date of publication: 1971
- Language: French

Chronology
- Preceded by: Asterix in Switzerland
- Followed by: Asterix and the Laurel Wreath

The Mansions of the Gods is the seventeenth graphic novel of the Asterix comic book series, written by René Goscinny and illustrated by Albert Uderzo. Originally released as a serial for the magazine Pilote in 1971, it was later made into a graphic novel, with an English translation released in 1973. The story focuses on Asterix and the Gauls attempting to thwart the latest Roman plan against them, when Caesar decrees that the forest surrounding them be converted into a new Roman colony for the wealthy.

== Plot summary ==
With the intent to force the village of indomitable Gauls to accept Roman civilization, Julius Caesar plans to destroy the surrounding forest to make way for a Roman patrician colony, called the 'Mansions of the Gods'. The project is led by the architect Squaronthehypotenus, who orders an army of slaves of various nationalities to pull down the trees in the forest. With the help of Getafix's magic, Asterix and Obelix plant acorns that grow into mature oak trees instantly; whereupon an increasingly erratic Squaronthehypotenus threatens "to work the slaves to death".

Taking this literally, Asterix gives the slaves magic potion with which to rebel; but the slaves, upon rebellion, don't stop work and leave, as Asterix intended, but insist on better working conditions, regular pay, and freedom after completing the first block of the Mansions of the Gods. Upon hearing that the slaves are better paid than they, the Roman legionaries go on strike for similar and better conditions for themselves. Since the freedom of the slaves depends on constructing at least one building, the Gauls allow the work to proceed. After their release, a group of the former slaves (among them the - almost - luckless pirates from previous adventures) "float a company" with their wages.

Finally, the first completed building of the Mansions of the Gods is inhabited by Roman families: the first of these consisting of a middle class husband and wife selected by lottery. These Romans then go shopping in the village which, before long, turns into a tourist trap selling "antique" weapons and fish to the Romans, embroiled in price wars and (in the case of some of the wives) assuming Roman dress. To counteract this, Asterix asks Squaronthehypotenus for an apartment, but is told they are full; whereafter the initial winners of the first apartment are continually harassed by Obelix acting like a rabid monster, with Asterix holding him back. The next day, the couple returns to Rome, and Asterix arranges for Cacofonix the bard to move into the vacated apartment. As a result of the bard's discordant nocturnal practice, the rest of the Roman inhabitants return to Rome as well.

Squaronthehypotenus tries to keep the Mansions in business by bringing the local Roman soldiers as tenants and expels Cacofonix from the building; whereupon the Gauls take this as an insult, and destroy the Roman colony. The legionnaires gratefully return to their camp and Squaronthehypotenus announces his plan to go to Egypt to build pyramids in the desert with "nice quiet tenants". That evening, the Gauls hold their usual celebratory banquet (in which this time Cacofonix takes part) and the ruins of the mansion are covered by Getafix's instantaneous trees.

In the end, Asterix takes the druid aside and asks: "O druid Getafix, do you think we can always stop the course of events as we have just done?" - "Of course not, Asterix. But we still have time. Plenty of time.”

== Notes ==
- Following the French riots of May 1968, Goscinny made increasing references in Asterix to current political events in France. In Mansions of the Gods he caricatures modern technocracy (the young urban planner), the gigantic "villes nouvelles" (new cities) of high-rises, and especially advertising.
- The interaction between Squaronthehypotenus and the slaves resembles that of modern-day employers, trade unionists, and workers on strike.
- The quizmaster in the Circus Maximus who coerces the reluctant winner to accept his prize is a caricature of the French television entertainer Guy Lux.
- The character named Flaturtha was a reference to the nascent modern flat Earth movement of the 1970s, and a reference to the Numidian king Jugurtha.
- A Lusitanian who makes a brief appearance among the slave workforce returns as a main character in the later album Asterix in Lusitania.

== Adaptations ==
In November 2014, an adaptation of The Mansions of the Gods was released as a 3D computer-animated feature film, titled Asterix: The Mansions of the Gods. Produced in France by M6 Studio and Mikros Image, the adaptation maintained much of the plot elements from the graphic novel, but made a number of changes:

- In the novel, the family in the lottery is hounded by Obelix and later leave. In the adaptation, they find themselves homeless twice, and befriend Asterix and Obelix, helping them deal with the Roman army.
- The Gauls are offered rent-free apartments as part of Caesar's plan, and thus adopt Roman lifestyles when they move in; they fail to move out the Roman civilians.
- The slaves mostly remain as a workforce constructing the colony, and later become Roman soldiers.

== In other languages ==
- Catalan: La residència dels déus
- Croatian: Grad bogova
- Czech: Sídliště bohů
- Danish: Byplanlæggeren
- Dutch: De Romeinse lusthof
- Finnish: Jumaltenrannan nousu ja tuho (The Rise and Destruction of Gods' Shore)
- German: Die Trabantenstadt (The satellite town)
- Greek: Η κατοικία των θεών
- Hebrew: אחוזת האלים
- Indonesian: Negeri Dewa-dewa
- Irish: Asterix i gCoill na Cinsealachta
- Italian: Asterix e il Regno degli Dei
- Norwegian: Byplanleggeren (The town planner)
- Polish: Osiedle bogów
- Portuguese: O domínio dos deuses
- Romanian: Domeniul Zeiilor
- Spanish: La residencia de los dioses
- Swedish: Gudarnas hemvist
- Serbian: Grad bogova
- Turkish: Tanrılar Sitesi
- Welsh: Rhandir y duwiau
