= Asterix and the Picts =

2013 French comic book

Asterix and the Picts (Astérix chez les Pictes)
- Date: 2013
- Main characters: Asterix and Obelix
- Series: Asterix

Creative team
- Writer: Jean-Yves Ferri
- Artist: Didier Conrad

Original publication
- Date of publication: 24 October 2013
- Language: French
- ISBN: 978-2-86497-266-2

Translation
- Date: 2013
- ISBN: 978-1-4440-1167-8

Chronology
- Preceded by: Asterix and Obelix's Birthday: The Golden Book
- Followed by: Asterix and the Missing Scroll

Asterix and the Picts is the 35th book in the Asterix series, and is the first book to be written by someone other than René Goscinny or Albert Uderzo. It was written by Jean-Yves Ferri and illustrated by Didier Conrad. The English-language version was translated by Anthea Bell.

It takes Asterix and Obelix across the Channel into Scotland, where they meet the Picts. This is the duo's second journey to the British Isles, after visiting the Britons in Asterix in Britain (1966).

== Plot ==
One winter day, while searching for oysters, Asterix and Obelix find a young man frozen in ice washed up on the beach. They take him to the druid Getafix, who by the stranger's clothes and tattoos identifies him as a Pict, residents of Northern Caledonia (now Scotland). Getafix is able to revive him, but the Pict has lost his voice and is unable to express himself, even in sign language; a gold ring clenched in his hand is the only clue to his background story. A minor complication ensues when a Roman census officer, Limitednumbus, arrives at the village to record the Gauls' activities, which Vitalstatistix allows him to do.

Following Getafix's administrations, the young Pict regains only limited power of speech and the Gauls cannot understand him. One day, he chisels a map on one of Obelix's menhirs, leading to his home. With this clue, and additional enticement provided by the village women's increasing fascination for the handsome young man, Asterix and Obelix are tasked with taking him home, along with some healing elixir for the Pict's throat. As they leave in Unhygenix's fishing boat and encounter (and fight) the pirates, the Pict fully recovers his voice. He introduces himself as MacAroon and tells them how he was ambushed by MacCabaeus, the chief of the MacCabee clan, tied to a log and thrown into the loch near his home because MacCabeus is longing for the hand of MacAroon's fiancée Camomilla, the adopted daughter of Mac II, late monarch of Caledonia, in order to make himself king of all Picts. In an effort to consolidate his claim, MacCabaeus has pleaded for an alliance with Rome and secretly invited a Roman legion to his coronation.

After a playful encounter with Loch Androll's monstrous resident Nessie, who steals the gourd with the elixir, they land and go to visit MacAroon's family. However, MacAroon learns there that Camomilla has been kidnapped by MacCabaeus shortly after his disappearance, and that MacCabaeus is going to be crowned king the next day. Asterix motivates him to challenge MacCabaeus, but MacAroon loses his voice again. Asterix and Obelix attempt to retrieve the gourd from Nessie, but in the process they stumble upon a tunnel which leads them straight to the Red Picts' dungeon, where Camomilla is kept captive. They rescue her and escape through one of the tunnels.

The next day, all the Pict leaders assemble to elect their next king. As MacCabaeus advances with his Roman allies and promotes himself, MacAroon and his family arrive at the island and confront MacCabaeus; but the challenge is declared void because Macaroon has yet to recover the full use of his voice. Through a tunnel emerging right onto the assembly island, Asterix, Obelix and Camomilla arrive at the nick of time to defy MacCabaeus, and the sight of Camomilla restores MacAroon's voice. The Gauls and the Picts unite and fight the Romans and MacCabaeus (with some help from Nessie), crushing them. MacCabaeus and the Roman task force's centurion then suffer the same fate MacAroon did, being chained to a log and tossed into the freezing Caledonian waters, and MacAroon is made king of the Picts.

The Gauls return home in triumph. Meanwhile, Limitednumbus has become frustrated by the constant movement of the Gauls, which does not allow him to count them properly. Obelix is about to tie him to a tree trunk and send him to the Picts, when Asterix reminds him that there is an easy way of counting Gauls: the banquet at the end of the story.

== Notes ==
- While his voice is impaired, in the English version Macaroon keeps spouting lines from several popular Scottish songs and poems, including Scots Wha Hae, The Bonnie Banks o' Loch Lomond, and Waly Waly. He also makes references to some un-Scottish lyrics, including Jingle Bells, The Rime of the Ancient Mariner, and Jabberwocky, and the Picts quote Bonnie Dundee at Macaroon's coronation. These citations do not exist in the original French version; instead Macaroon keeps inserting occasional taglines based on popular music titles into his speeches, including Jingle Bells, Ob-La-Di, Ob-La-Da, and Stayin' Alive.
