= Asterix and the Chieftain's Daughter =

38th comic book in the Asterix series

Asterix and the Chieftain's Daughter (La Fille de Vercingétorix)
- Series: Asterix

Creative team
- Writers: Jean-Yves Ferri
- Artists: Didier Conrad

Original publication
- Date of publication: 24 October 2019
- Language: French

Chronology
- Preceded by: Asterix and the Chariot Race
- Followed by: Asterix and the Griffin

Asterix and the Chieftain's Daughter (French: La Fille de Vercingétorix, "The Daughter of Vercingetorix") is the 38th book in the Asterix series, and the fourth to be written by Jean-Yves Ferri and illustrated by Didier Conrad. The book was released worldwide in more than 20 languages on 24 October 2019 with an initial print run of over 5 million copies.

It was the last Asterix book to be released during the lifetime of the series' co-creator Albert Uderzo, who died on 24 March 2020.

== Plot ==
One evening, the Gaulish village is visited by two Arverni chieftains, Monolithix and Sidekix, who were lieutenants to Vercingetorix up to the fateful battle of Alesia and thus good acquaintances of Vitalstatistix. They have brought Vercingetorix's daughter Adrenalin, who wears her father's torc, a symbol of Gaulish resistance. Julius Caesar has learned of her existence and wants her taken captive and re-educated to Roman ways. The Arverni chieftains ask Vitalstatistix to keep Adrenalin safe until they can relocate her to Britain, where the Romans will not expect to find her.

Vitalstatistix agrees to protect the girl, assigning Asterix and Obelix as her minders. Rebellious and strong-willed, Adrenalin quickly wearies of the village's adults and befriends the younger generation, particularly Selfipix and Blinix, the eldest sons of Fulliautomatix and Unhygienix respectively. She decides to abscond from her role as a figurehead of war, and her new friends help her sneak out of the village.

A Gaulish traitor named Binjwatchflix has tracked down Adrenalin and put the surrounding Roman garrisons on alert. During the chaotic search between the Gauls, the Romans and Binjwatchflix for her, Adrenalin encounters two of the pirates collecting fresh water and, to Redbeard's consternation, attempts to commandeer their ship in order to sail to Thule to live her life in peace. Asterix and Obelix spot the pirate ship and take up pursuit, along with Selfipix, Blinix and Dogmatix. Additionally, Binjwatchflix has stowed away on the pirate ship. In a rapid sequence of events, the Gauls and pirates are forced to contend with Adrenalin's stubbornness and a Roman galley attacking them. Amid the fighting, Binjwatchflix grabs the girl and the torc and entrenches himself on the pirate ship's lookout post. Obelix rips out the mast, causing the ship to sink and dropping Binjwatchflix and Adrenalin into the sea. Upon climbing into the Gauls' boat, Binjwatchflix is bitten by Dogmatix, causing him to drop the torc into the ocean. He then jumps overboard to swim to safety but is followed by a shark, leaving his fate in doubt.

Back in the village, Adrenalin defies Monolithix and Sidekix, wishing to be no part of their rebellion. The Arverni soon find that one of their warriors is wearing Vercingetorix's ceremonial helmet and make him the new figurehead of their resistance. After giving her blessing to Asterix's village as Vercingetorix's true successors, Adrenalin departs for Thule with a young shipmaster named Peacenix. They eventually end up with some multi-ethnic children at a tropical island.

== Notes ==
- Details of the book were announced at a press conference on 10 April 2019 at Parc Asterix. Writer Ferri described the titular character as a typically rebellious teenager but with the temperament of her famous father. A theme of the book is dealing with adolescence. "Adolescence is finding one's way, despite one's parents", said Ferri.
- This album is the second instance following Asterix and the Chieftain's Shield in which the Gauls demonstrate their shame over the defeat at Alesia, here symbolized by their general reluctance to say the name of Vercingetorix aloud.
- After a 38-year absence, the Phoenician trader Ekonomikrisis makes a cameo appearance as a recent victim of the Pirates.
- Peacenix, on whose ship Monolithix and Sidekix returned to Gaul, at one point quotes from Imagine by John Lennon.
- One of the pirates is a caricature of Charles Aznavour, who had died a year before the story's publication.
- At the customary banquet at the end of the book, Cacofonix the bard is only playfully tied up by the village children, and left ungagged.
