= Asterix the Gladiator =

Comic book album

Asterix the Gladiator (Astérix Gladiateur)
- Cover of the English edition
- Date: 1964
- Main characters: Asterix and Obelix
- Series: Asterix

Creative team
- Writers: René Goscinny
- Artists: Albert Uderzo

Original publication
- Published in: Pilote magazine
- Issues: 126–168
- Date of publication: 1961–1962
- Language: French

Translation
- Publisher: Brockhampton Press
- Translator: Anthea Bell and Derek Hockridge

Chronology
- Preceded by: Asterix and the Goths
- Followed by: Asterix and the Banquet

Asterix the Gladiator (French: Astérix Gladiateur) is a French comic story, written by René Goscinny and illustrated by Albert Uderzo. It is the fourth story in the Asterix comic book series, and was originally published by Dargaud as a serial for Pilote magazine in 1962, before later being released as a comic album in 1964.

The story focuses on Asterix and Obelix heading to Rome to rescue their village's bard, Cacofonix, which culminates in them having to infiltrate the gladiatorial games in order to save his life.

Asterix and the Gladiator received positive reviews following its publication, with its plot being later combined with the story from Asterix the Legionary for the 1985 animated film, Asterix Versus Caesar.

== Plot summary ==
Prefect Odius Asparagus, while travelling around Gaul, makes a stop at the camp of Compendium in Armorica. There, he informs Centurion Gracchus Armisurplus, the camp's commander, that he intends to gift Julius Caesar with one of the Gauls from the village that resists Roman rule. Relunctantly, Armisurplus orders his men to kidnap Cacofonix the bard, who is deemed the easiest to abduct despite his bad singing. When the village is alerted to this by one of its children, the Gauls assault Compendium. When Asterix confronts and interrogates Armisurplus, he learns that Asparagus took Cacofonix before the attack, and is on his way to Rome on his personal galley. Asterix and Obelix decide to go after them, and secure passage onboard a ship owned by Ekonomikrisis, a Phoenician merchant.

Although the merchant plans to sell them as slaves at their destination, Ekonomikrisis has a change of heart when the Gauls help defend them against a band of pirates. Upon arriving in Rome, the pair visit a restaurant owned by a Gaulish chef named Instantmix, who offers to help them find Cacofonix, but request they discuss the matter privately at his home in the evening. To pass the time, Asterix and Obelix visit the public baths of the city, where they unknowingly catch the interest of Caius Fatuous, a prominent gladiator trainer, who considers them perfect candidates for the upcoming games at the Circus Maximus. When evening arrives, the pair meet with Instantmix, who reveals to them that Cacofonix was imprisoned in the Circus and is set to be fed to the lions in the games - Caesar having decreed this after Asparagus presented the bard to him, who was then examined by Fatuous over his fighting skills.

The next day, the Gauls attempt to rescue Cacofonix from the Circus but discover he was moved to a secure cell, mainly due to his singing proving problematic for the Romans. Deciding they need to enter the games in order to save him, Asterix and Obelix attempt to seek out Fatuous. Unaware the trainer has sent his men to capture them, whom they thwart unknowingly, and later issue a bounty on their head, the Gauls present themselves to Fatous at his gladiator school. Upon being sent for training, the pair irritate Fatuous by having the other gladiators take part in a guessing-game rather than in combat. On the eve of the games, after having Fatuous give them a guided tour of Rome, Asterix and Obelix visit Cacofonix in his cell, informing him of their plan to free both him and the gladiators they met.

On the day of the games, Asterix and Obelix substitute themselves into a chariot race and win it with ease, while Cacofonix manages to frighten the lions when he decides to sing. Annoyed, Caesar orders the gladiators to begin their fight, but becomes infuriated when they instead choose to play the guessing game they were taught. At Asterix's insistence, a cohort of Caesar's own guard is sent into the Circus, only for Asterix and Obelix to defeat them, much to the delight of the audience. Surprised by their reaction, Caesar releases the Gauls and hands them Fatuous to be their prisoner. The Gauls soon have him row them back to their village on Ekonomikrisis' galley, whereupon they ask the merchant to return him back to Rome. Once home, the villagers throw a banquet in honour of Asterix and Obelix's latest adventure, though with Cacofonix bound and gagged as usual to prevent him singing.

== Characters ==
- Asterix – Gaulish warrior, and the main protagonist of the story.
- Obelix – Gaulish menhir delivery man and warrior, and a close friend of Asterix.
- Getafix – Gaulish druid of the village, responsible for the superhuman magic potion they use.
- Vitalstatistix – Chief of the Gaulish village.
- Cacofonix – Gaulish bard of the village.
- Geriatrix – An elderly resident of the Gaulish village. In the story, he was mainly a minor character who was unnamed, but Goscinny and Uderzo later decided to flesh out the character for future novels regarding his life and his personality.
- Julius Caesar – Leader of the Roman Empire (based upon the historical version of the real-life Roman figure).
- Caius Fatuous – Trainer of gladiators for the arena, based in Rome.
- Odius Asparagus – A prefect sent by Rome to inspect Gaul.
- Gracchus Armisurplus – Current camp commander of Compendium.
- Ekonomikrisis – A Phoenician merchant, whom Asterix befriends on their journey to Rome.
- The Pirates – A group of pirates led by Captain Redbeard. The characters were designed as parodies of the characters from the French comic "Barbe-Rouge" which was also serialized in Pilote at the time. Goscinny and Uderzo later decided to include them in future novels, often being humiliated by the Gauls directly or indirectly.

== Adaptations ==
In 1985, Dargaud produced an original animated film for the Asterix series, titled Asterix Versus Caesar. The film borrowed several key elements from Asterix the Gladiator, combining them with several plot elements taken from Asterix the Legionary.

An English audiobook adaptation of the story was also published in 1988. The adaptation was done by Anthea Bell, with narration from Willie Rushton. The audibook was distributed by EMI Records under their Listen for Pleasure label.
