= Asterix and Caesar's Gift =

Comic book album

Asterix and Caesar's Gift (Le Cadeau de César)
- Date: 1977
- Series: Asterix

Creative team
- Writers: Rene Goscinny
- Artists: Albert Uderzo

Original publication
- Date of publication: 1974
- Language: French

Chronology
- Preceded by: Asterix in Corsica
- Followed by: Asterix and the Great Crossing

Asterix and Caesar's Gift is the twenty-first volume of the Asterix comic book series, by René Goscinny (stories) and Albert Uderzo (illustrations). It was the first Asterix adventure that was not published in serial form in Pilote magazine prior to its publication as a book.

== Synopsis ==
Having completed twenty years of service in the Roman Army, veteran legionaries Tremensdelirius and Egganlettus await their honesta missio in the morning. However, that night Tremensdelirius - a lifelong alcoholic - insults Julius Caesar while intoxicated and gets arrested. When Caesar is informed of Tremensdelirius's mishap, he decides to play a practical joke on him. As each of the legionaries are gifted plots of land in retirement, with Egganlettus receiving a plot in Nicaea, Caesar awards a "special" one to Tremensdelirius: Asterix's village in Armorica, hoping they will retaliate violently against him. However, Tremensdelirius sees little merit in a gift he cannot drink and immediately begins trying to unload it. He eventually succeeds at an inn in Arausio, where he convinces the owner Orthopaedix to take it as payment for huge amounts of wine when he can’t provide monetary payment. Orthopaedix, a Lutetia native, had already been looking for a change in scenery along with his wife Angina and daughter Influenza, the latter constantly craving her opulent life in Lutetia.

Orthopaedix’s family arrives at the village, claiming ownership of it and demanding the villagers leave. The villagers laugh them off and reveal that Caesar does not own the village at all, making the gift worthless. However, when Vitalstatistix overhears Angina berating Orthopaedix for his mistake by comparing him unfavorably to her relatives in Lutetia - a situation that Vitalstatistix is very familiar with - he takes pity on Orthopaedix and decides to offer him a building next to Unhygienix’s house to open a new inn. Obelix soon has a crush on Influenza, while Geriatrix expresses xenophobic attitudes towards the family.

The villagers attend the new inn's opening night, but Impedimenta and Angina start arguing about who owns the village. Coupled with yet another argument over Unhygienix’s fish, a fight ensues and the inn is trashed as a result. The next morning, a bruised Orthopaedix becomes fed up and agrees to go back to Lutetia. Angina refuses, though, and declares her intention to have revenge on Impedimenta by turning Vitalstatistix out of office and having Orthopaedix made chief. Though Orthopaedix is reluctant to do so, Angina and Impedimenta quickly strong-arm the situation in their favor, prompting a run-off between Vitalstatistix and Orthopaedix.

Vitalstatistix, shocked, has Cacofonix obtain an opinion poll of the villagers and learns that aside from Geriatrix, the villagers don't really care, until Vitalstatistix makes a few remarks that offends some of the villagers, making them go to the other side. A political race starts, and Geriatrix thinks Vitalstatistix is weak and tries to stand for Chief himself. Asterix becomes worried that internal conflict could benefit the Romans, but ends up causing Obelix, who believes he is successfully courting Influenza, to side with Orthopaedix when he confides in him.

Meanwhile, Tremensdelirius arrives at the village to visit Orthopaedix, explains that since their last meeting he unsuccessfully tried all kinds of trade (including with the pirates) and he wants his land back, since he is in fact not allowed to sell the land. When the family refuses, he draws his sword. Asterix arrives, and the two fight, with Asterix humiliating Tremensdelirius, Swearing revenge, Tremensdelirius goes to the Laudanum Roman camp and finds Egganlettus serving as an aide-de-camp under the local centurion (as he found retirement boring and signed up for another 20 years). With his support, Tremensdelirius makes an official request to the centurion to restore his land. Knowing full well of their capabilities, the centurion is reluctant to face the Gauls, but the veterans threaten to report him to Caesar, and he agrees to prepare a military attack with the new weapons they have.

The following day, Asterix attempts to warn everyone about Tremensdelirius, but everyone is so caught up in the worsening political situation that his warning falls on deaf ears. Hence, Asterix decides to investigate alone and discovers that the Romans are preparing siege weapons. The Romans see him, but are afraid to attack, allowing him to retreat and escape (as he has no magic potion with him to fight against them due to Getafix locking himself away in an attempt to remain neutral). His escape gives the Romans the belief that the Gauls can no longer resist the Romans, and makes them more confident.

Asterix returns to the village and again attempts to warn them, but everyone gathers to witness a public debate between Vitalstatistix and Orthopaedix, until it is interrupted by rocks launched from the Roman catapults. When Vitalstatistix asks for the druid to give magic potion to his rival instead, Getafix finally agrees to help them. The villagers manage to defeat the Romans, with Orthopaedix himself confronting Tremensdelirius and smashing the tablet representing ownership of the village on Tremensdelirius's head; Egganlettus also attacks Tremensdelirius after the latter attempts to sell him out to avoid fighting.

Returning home, Vitalstatistix offers Orthopaedix the chance to be chief, but a far more confident Orthopaedix decides to withdraw his claim for leadership and return to Lutetia, finally standing up to Angina in the process. Impedimenta and Angina also become friends by bonding over their siblings in Lutetia, while Geriatrix reluctantly throws in the towel as well after being ignored. Obelix is saddened that Influenza will be happily leaving with her parents but is reconciled with Asterix. The village then hosts a banquet.

== Commentary ==
- The granting of land to Roman soldiers after long years of service is historically true.
- Tremensdelirius, in English, was named after his drunkenness; in the original French language his name is given as Roméomontaigus after Romeo Montague, one of two title characters in Romeo and Juliet by William Shakespeare. The connection between the two characters is not particularly evident.
- Orthopaedix is drawn as a caricature of André Alerme (September 9, 1877 – February 2, 1960), an actor.
- Influenza is called 'Zaza' for short (a possible reference to Zsa Zsa Gabor), and therefore interprets Asterix's victory over Tremensdelirius, in which he cut the letter 'Z' in Tremensdelirius' clothing, as dedicated to her. In fact the Z is a reference to Zorro; the TV series was often shown on TV in continental Europe. Asterix's dialogue during the swordfight is a reference to Cyrano de Bergerac. (In the English translation it includes references to the climactic swordfight in Hamlet.)
- Vitalstatistix and his brother-in-law Homeopathix confront each other in person at the beginning and the finale of Asterix and the Laurel Wreath, and Impedimenta entertains hopes of the two entering a partnership in Asterix and the Soothsayer; whereas here, Vitalstatistix befriends Orthopaedix on grounds that the latter, like himself, has quarreled with in-laws in Lutetia.
- This is the second time Vitalstatistix is challenged by a contender to the leadership of the village, and the first time his leadership is challenged by the population of the village. He is not challenged again until Asterix and the Secret Weapon.
- This is the first time the Gauls of the story are shown electing leaders as if in democracy; but here, the leader has no fixed term and retains leadership until challenged; potentially until death.
- This story has one of only a few scenes where Asterix uses his sword, and one of an equally few in which Cacofonix is not bound and gagged at the end of the story.
- The story parodies political campaigns in general, election campaigns in particular, and perhaps especially the French presidential election of 1974 (which was won by Valery Giscard d'Estaing), the date of publication of this album. Election day is mentioned as set for the celebration day of Lugh; but the election is cancelled after the withdrawal of Orthopaedix.
- In some of the scenes (after Vitalstatistix falls off his shield), there is a hen in love with Vitalstatistix's helmet.
