= De Gaulle à la plage =

French comic series

Publication information
- Publisher: Dargaud
- Publication date: 2007

Creative team
- Written by: Jean-Yves Ferri

De Gaulle à la plage is a 2007 comic book which was created by Jean-Yves Ferri.

== Synopsis ==
The story presents General de Gaulle in a comical scenario as vacationer, somewhere on a Brittany beach, and his many satirical adventures.

== Animated series ==
De Gaulle à la plage was adapted into a Arte animated television series starring Philippe Rolland. The series ran for 32 episodes.

== Season 1 ==
=== Episode list ===
No.	Title	Original release date
1	(French: Les tongs)	November 6, 2020
2	(French: Le lyrisme)	TBA
3	(French: L'appel)	TBA
4	(French: La papatte)	TBA
5	(French: Les occupations)	TBA
6	(French: Les occupations)	TBA
7	(French: La baignade)	TBA
8	(French: Le jokari)	TBA
9	(French: L'opposition)	TBA
10	(French: Le ras le bol)	TBA
11	(French: La vague)	TBA
12	(French: Le traumatisme)	TBA
13	(French: Le bon temps)	TBA
14	(French: L'incident)	TBA
15	(French: La réunion au sommet)	TBA

== Season 2 ==
=== Episode list ===
No.	Title	Original release date
1	(French: La permission)	TBA
2	(French: Le ciné)	TBA
3	(French: L'interview)	TBA
4	(French: Le blocage)	TBA
5	(French: Le grésillement)	TBA
6	(French: La paranoïa)	TBA
7	(French: Les nouvelles)	TBA
8	(French: La mémoire courte)	TBA
9	(French: L'appui des forces sous-marines)	TBA
10	(French: La marée montante)	TBA
11	(French: L'ankou)	TBA
12	(French: Le cahier de vacances)	TBA
13	(French: La jeunesse perdue)	TBA
14	(French: La rencontre)	TBA
15	(French: L'amourette)	TBA
