= Jean-Yves Ferri =

French cartoonist, screenwriter and illustrator

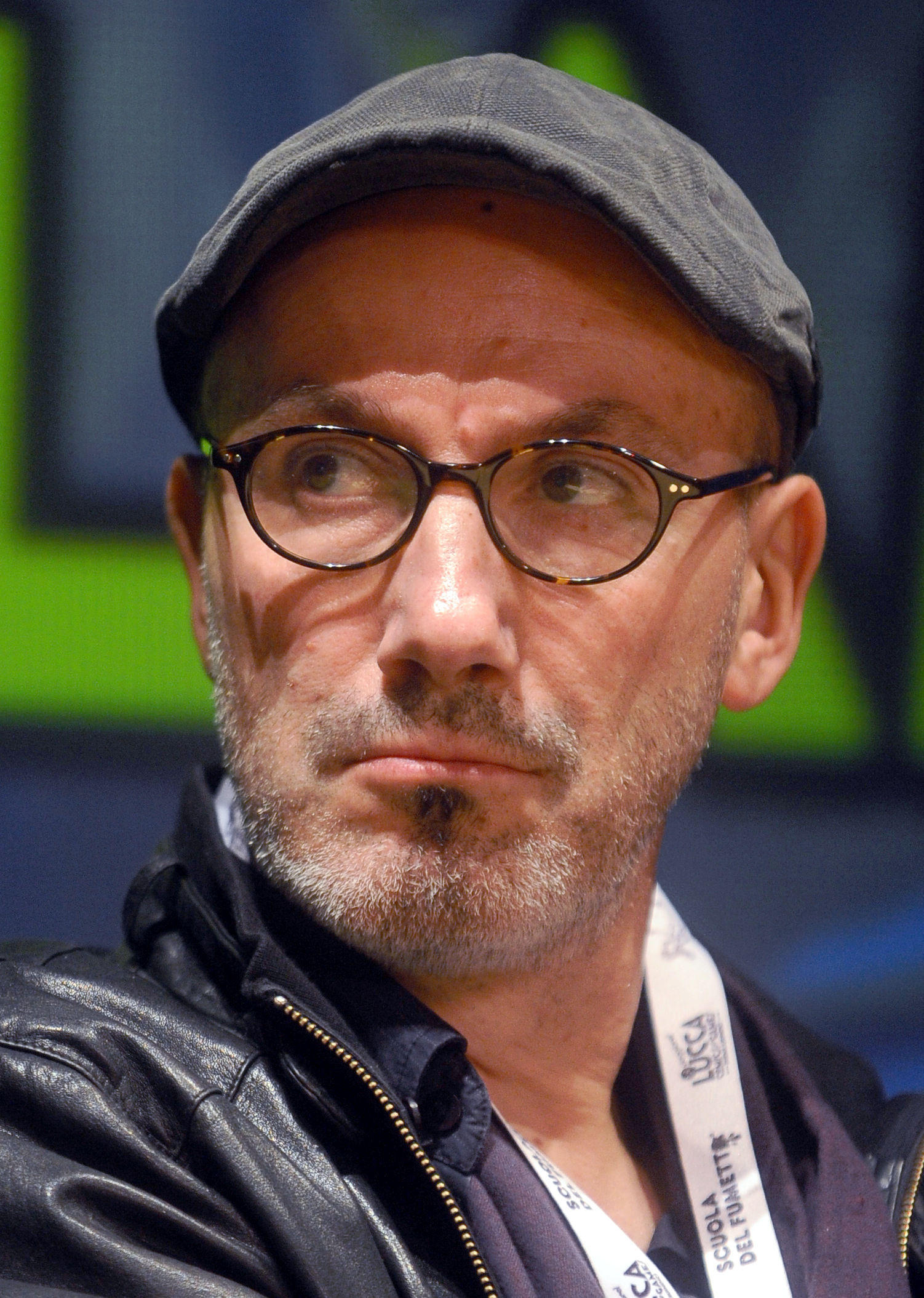
- Ferri at Lucca Comics & Games 2015
- Born: Jean-Yves Ferri; 20 April 1959 (age 67) Mostaganem, Algeria
- Notable works: De Gaulle à la plage
- Awards: Ordre des Arts et des Lettres

Jean-Yves Ferri (French: [fɛʁi]) (born 20 April 1959) is a French writer, designer, and colourist of comics.

On 25 July 2011, he was chosen as the writer for the next installment of the Asterix series created by René Goscinny and Albert Uderzo. Uderzo personally mentored him and Didier Conrad, who was subsequently announced as the artist. The 35th Asterix volume, Asterix and the Picts, was published on 24 October 2013. The next volume, the 36th Asterix volume, Asterix and the Missing Scroll, was released on 22 October 2015 and the 37th volume, Asterix and the Chariot Race, was released in 2017, followed by Asterix and the Chieftain's Daughter in 2019 and Asterix and the Griffin in 2021. Ferri was replaced by Fabrice Caro as writer starting with the 2023 volume, Asterix and the White Iris.

== Prizes ==
- Prix de l'Humour noir Grandville in 2005 (Revoir Corfou)
- Prix Jacques Lob in 2008
- Prix Virgin 2005 (Le Vaste Monde)

== Publications ==
- Fables autonomes, Audie
1. Tome 1, 1996
2. Tome 2, 1998
- Aimé Lacapelle, Audie
1. Je veille aux grains, 2000
2. Tonnerre sur le sud-ouest, 2001
3. Poules rebelles, 2003
4. Bêtes à bon diou, 2007
- Le Retour à la terre, with Manu Larcenet
1. La Vraie Vie, 2002.
2. Les Projets, 2003.
3. Le Vaste Monde, 2005.
4. Le Déluge, 2006.
5. Les Révolutions, 2008.
- Revoir Corfou, le recueil des dessins hors-séries, collection Azote Liquide, Audie, 2004
- Correspondances, with Manu Larcenet, Les Rêveurs, coll. « M'as-tu vu », 2006.
- Le Sens de la vis, with Manu Larcenet, Les Rêveurs, coll. « M'as-tu vu »,
1. tome 1 : Le Sens de la vis (2007)
2. tome 2 : Tracer le cercle (2010)
- De Gaulle à la plage, Dargaud, coll. « Poisson Pilote », 2007. Couleur Patrice Larcenet.
- Asterix and the Picts - 2013
- Asterix and the Missing Scroll - 2015
- Asterix and the Chariot Race - 2017
- Asterix and the Chieftain's Daughter - 2019
- Asterix and the Griffin - 2021
