= Asterix and the Class Act =

2003 comic book by René Goscinny and Albert Uderzo

Asterix and the Class Act (Astérix et la rentrée gauloise)
- Date: 2003
- Series: Asterix

Creative team
- Writers: René Goscinny and Albert Uderzo
- Artists: Albert Uderzo

Original publication
- Date of publication: 2003
- Language: French

Chronology
- Preceded by: Asterix and the Actress
- Followed by: Asterix and the Falling Sky

Asterix and the Class Act (French: Astérix et la rentrée gauloise, "Asterix and the Gaulish return; la rentrée is the French return to school after the summer break) is officially the thirty-second album of the Asterix comic book series, by René Goscinny (stories) and Albert Uderzo (illustrations and some stories), published in 2003. Unlike the other Asterix books, it is a compilation of short stories, rather than one long story. Each story has an introductory page giving some of its original history.

== History ==
Only one of these stories ("Chanticleerix") is completely original in this album; the remainder are reprinted from earlier sources, most notably the French comic Pilote. The majority of these stories were written by Goscinny. "Chanticleerix", "The Lutetia Olympics" and "The Birth of Asterix" were written by Uderzo after Goscinny's death. "Springtime in Gaul" and "Asterix As You Have Never Seen Him Before..." were also written by Uderzo alone.

Most of these stories have had only very limited distribution prior to this publication. In the mid-1980s, a promotional collection of some of these stories appeared in a number of translations (but not English) as Astérix mini-histoires (Asterix Mini-Stories). In 1993 there was an earlier, smaller collection also called La Rentree Gauloise which was only available in French. It also contained a four-page story called "L'Antiquaire" (The Antique Dealer) as filler which wasn't written by Goscinny, but drawn by Albert's brother Marcel Uderzo, does not fit with the other stories and contains two recycled and out-of-character villains. That story has not been reprinted, but otherwise "Class Act" is an expanded, updated version of this.

== The stories ==
=== Introduction (Press Conference) ===
Originally an announcement page for Asterix and the Big Fight – Vitalstatistix holds a modern press conference for the upcoming stories (parodying the contemporary press conferences of then-president Charles de Gaulle).

(1964 – Conférence de presse) – 1 page. First published in Pilote #260; Appeared in "Astérix mini-histoires"

=== Asterix and the Class Act ===
Asterix and Obelix catch the village children attempting to commit truancy at the start of the school year, but Obelix is put in class too when he shows ignorance of current affairs.

(1966 – Rentrée gauloise) – 2 pages. First published in Pilote #363; Appeared in the original "La Rentree Gauloise" and "Astérix mini-histoires"

=== The Birth of Asterix ===
Story of the village on the day of Asterix's and Obelix's birth, which interrupts a quarrel among their friends' fathers.

(1994 – En 35 avant J.C. (Julius Caesar)) – 4 pages. Published in the 35th anniversary special of Pilote (the first Asterix story began in the first issue).

=== In 50 BC ===
Introduction to the stories (done for the American market): gives a synopsis of the themes and principal characters.

(1977 – En 50 avant J.C.) – 3 pages. First published in the May 1977 issue of National Geographic Magazine for an article on the history of Celtic people. Appeared in the original "La Rentree Gauloise" and "Astérix mini-histoires"

=== Chanticleerix ===
Dogmatix helps the village rooster (national bird of France) defeat an eagle (symbol of Rome) terrorizing the local animals, by stealing Asterix's gourd of potion to provide the rooster with the necessary advantage.

(2003 – Chanteclairix – Le Coq Gaulois) – 5 pages. New with this album.

=== For Gaul Lang Syne ===
Obelix tries to use Gaulish customs to get a kiss from Panacea, but fails, and the kiss is instead won by Dogmatix.

(1967 – Au gui l'an IX) – 2 pages. First published in Pilote #424. Appeared in the original "La Rentree Gauloise" and "Astérix mini-histoires"

=== Mini Midi Maxi ===
A fashion show generates a fight after Impedimenta quarrels with Mrs. Geriatrix.

(1971 – Mini, Midi, Maxi) – 2 pages. Done for French women's magazine "Elle" #1337. Appeared in the original "La Rentree Gauloise" and "Astérix mini-histoires"

=== Asterix As You Have Never Seen Him Before... ===
This is a mockery of the more outrageous "suggestions" made by readers, allowing Uderzo to show his facility with different styles of illustration:

- in a quasi-modernized one-panel plot in which Getafix has constructed modern firearms (which Asterix and Obelix do not know how to use properly), Asterix is telephoning Getafix, and where the word "like" is constantly dropped into their speech (after a reader had written a letter punctuated with the word "like" to Goscinny, complaining that the characters looked weird and old fashioned),
- black and white, simplistic line drawings and telegram-type text in a very short story satirizing Asterix and the Great Crossing (following a reader's complaint - also in telegram text - that the Asterix stories were too long and complicated),
- fighting aliens on a distant planet as Jim Asteryx (after a Flash Gordon fan had called the comics mediocre),
- and using flowers on female legionaries in a story drawn in a psychedelic style (following a reader's complaint that the Asterix stories were too male and too dull).
- Last of all, Goscinny and Uderzo write a message saying that as they are the authors, they should be allowed to draw Asterix as they wish, and so draw a picture of him and Obelix wearing plus-fours (a put-on of Tintin), much to Asterix and Obelix's fury.

(1969 – Amicales coopérations) – 3 pages. First published in Pilote #527.

=== The Lutetia Olympics ===
For the honour of Gaul, Asterix and Obelix help Lutetia (ancient Paris) win the chance to host the ancient Olympic Games by acting as security for the event.

(1986 – Lutèce olympique) – 4 pages. Done to aid the bid by Paris to host the 1992 Summer Olympics, and originally published in the bid's promotional materials.

=== Springtime in Gaul ===
Asterix helps a tiny anthropomorphic personification of Spring overcome Winter.

(1966 – Le printemps gaulois) – 2 pages. First published in Pilote #334. Appeared in the original "La Rentree Gauloise" and "Astérix mini-histoires"

=== The Mascot ===
Some unlucky Romans try to take Dogmatix as their "lucky" mascot, which brings Asterix and Obelix's vengeance down on them.

(1968 – La mascotte) – 4 pages. First Published in Pilote "Super Pocket 1". Appeared in the original "La Rentree Gauloise" and "Astérix mini-histoires"

=== Latinamania ===
A joke on modern French anxiety over the bastardization of the French language (cf. Franglais) shows the Gauls using Latin loanwords.

(1973 – Etc, etc ...) – 1 page. Where it was actually first published is not certain. Appeared in the original "La Rentree Gauloise" and "Astérix mini-histoires"

=== The Obelix Family Tree ===
The authors find a modern descendant of Obelix and invite him to their publishing house, only to learn that he is too much like his ancestor.

(1963 – Obelisc'h) – 5 pages. First serialized as strips in Pilote #172–186. Appeared in the original "La Rentree Gauloise"

=== The Birth of an Idea ===
This story depicts a brainstorming session between the authors, in which they become too excited by the idea of the stories' fights and are as a result carted off to a mental asylum.

(1962 – Naissance d'une idée) – 1 page. First published in Pilote #157. Appeared in the original "La Rentree Gauloise"

== Notes ==
In recent editions of some translations (notably German) a new short story is included:

=== Obelix: As Simple as ABC ===
Obelix tries to learn to read after he receives a letter from Panacea for his birthday which he does not want to share with anyone else. This was later included in the book Asterix and Obelix's Birthday: The Golden Book.

(2004 – Lire avec Obelix ) – 3 pages. First published in French literary magazine "LiRE" for the 45th anniversary of the Asterix comics.

== In other languages ==
- Croatian: Povratak u klupe (Back to school)
- Dutch: Het pretpakket
- Finnish: Gallialainen kertomataulu (The Gaulish Multiplication Table)
- German: Asterix plaudert aus der Schule (Asterix Talks of his School Time)
- Greek: Ο Αστερίξ και η επιστροφή των Γαλατών (Asterix and the return of the Gauls)
- Italian: Asterix tra banchi e... banchetti
- Occitan: Asterix a l'escòla gallesa
- Portuguese: Astérix e o regresso dos Gauleses (Portugal) / Astérix e a volta às aulas (Brazil)
- Polish: Galijskie początki
- Serbian: Asteriks i povratak u galsku školu
- Swedish: Åter till Gallien
- Breton: Astérix hag an distro
