= Asterix and the Missing Scroll =

2015 book in Asterix comics series

Asterix and the Missing Scroll (Le Papyrus de César)
- Date: 2015
- Main characters: Asterix and Obelix
- Series: Asterix

Creative team
- Writer: Jean-Yves Ferri
- Artist: Didier Conrad

Original publication
- Language: French

Translation
- Date: 22 October 2015
- Translator: Anthea Bell

Chronology
- Preceded by: Asterix and the Picts
- Followed by: Asterix and the Chariot Race

Asterix and the Missing Scroll (French: Le Papyrus de César, "Caesar's Papyrus") is the 36th book in the Asterix comics series, and the second written by Jean-Yves Ferri and illustrated by Didier Conrad. A central theme is censorship and the battle over information. The title alludes to Julius Caesar's classic book, Commentarii de Bello Gallico (Commentaries on the Gallic War). The comic adds a fictitious Chapter 24 titled "Defeats at the Hands of the Indomitable Gauls of Armorica".

== Plot ==
Caesar has completed writing his Commentaries on the Gallic War, but his publisher, Libellus Blockbustus, encourages him to omit Chapter 24 on "Defeats at the Hands of the Indomitable Gauls of Armorica", fearing it would besmirch the Roman leader's curriculum vitae. A mute black Numidian scribe, Bigdhata, steals a copy of the chapter and gives it to the journalist, the Orwell-esq Confoundtheirpolitix (a parody of Julian Assange), who in turn passes it on to the village of indomitable Gauls.

Chief Vitalstatistix is unfazed by the lie that all Gaul has been conquered by the Romans, but his wife Impedimenta urges him to campaign for the truth. Since the Gauls have, unlike the Greeks and Romans, no skills in reading and writing, the druid Getafix (accompanied by Asterix, Obelix and Dogmatix) travels to the sacred forest of the Carnutes to meet his former teacher, Archaeopterix, who will then pass on the truth by word of mouth to future generations. The true story eventually reaches René Goscinny and Albert Uderzo in a French cafe in modern times, who publish the censored tales in comic books as the Asterix adventures.

== Caricatures ==
The official Asterix site notes there are several caricatures of celebrities in the book.

- The newsmonger character Confoundtheirpolitix was inspired by and resembles Julian Assange. Jean-Yves Ferri said the character was almost called Wikilix in reference to WikiLeaks. Like Assange, Confoundtheirpolitix "makes use of the most modern networks to spread the news, and is something of a worry to the powerful in the Known World". The colors of his clothes resemble those of another reporter, Tintin, while the name is a reference to the British national anthem.
- Caesar's publisher Libellus Blockbustus resembles French advertising magnate Jacques Seguela, but Ferri said the character is actually based on presidential advisers Henri Guaino and Patrick Buisson, who both worked for former French president Nicolas Sarkozy.
- Film director Alfred Hitchcock is caricatured as an unnamed falconer among the entourage of Libellus Blockbustus. This is a tribute to Hitchcock as the director of The Birds.
- French actor Jean Réno appears as a soldier in Libellus Blockbustus's special unit tasked to retrieve the scroll.
- French journalist Franz-Olivier Giesbert is caricatured as the white-haired critic of Mundus.

== Notes ==
- The whistleblower character Bigdhata is an allusion to Edward Snowden and Chelsea Manning.
- Asterix and the Missing Scroll had an initial print-run of about 4 million copies, half in French and the other half in other languages. It was France's top-selling book of 2015, with more than 1.6 million copies sold.
- This book was the final Asterix book to be translated by long-time translator Anthea Bell, who was forced to retire due to illness in 2016.
- Anachronistix's pipe makes tweeting sounds and is accompanied by small blue birds, in an apparent reference to Twitter.
