= Asterix and the Griffin =

39th comic book in the Asterix series

Asterix and the Griffin (Astérix et le Griffon)
- Series: Asterix

Creative team
- Writers: Jean-Yves Ferri
- Artists: Didier Conrad

Original publication
- Date of publication: 21 October 2021
- Language: French

Chronology
- Preceded by: Asterix and the Chieftain's Daughter
- Followed by: Asterix and the White Iris

Asterix and the Griffin (French: Astérix et le Griffon) is the 39th book in the Asterix series, and the fifth to be written by Jean-Yves Ferri and illustrated by Didier Conrad. The book was released worldwide in more than 20 languages on 21 October 2021 with an initial print run of over 5 million copies. It is the first Asterix book to be released since the death of the series' co-creator Albert Uderzo, and the last to be penned by Ferri before his replacement with Fabrice Caro the following year.

== Plot ==
In Rome, the geographer Cartographus informs Julius Caesar of the reported existence of the griffin, a beast that is half-eagle and half-lion with horse's ears, located in Sarmatian territory in the remote eastern lands of Barbaricum. The Romans have captured a Sarmatian Amazon woman, Kalashnikova, who cautions against attempting to capture the griffin. Her warning is deliberately misinterpreted by Cartographus and goes unheeded. Caesar deploys an expedition of Roman soldiers to locate and capture the griffin, which he intends to display at the circus in Rome in an effort to boost his popularity.

Later, the Gaulish druid Getafix, accompanied by Asterix, Obelix and Dogmatix, arrives in the snow-covered land of Sarmatia to visit his old friend, a shaman named Fanciacuppov. The Gauls have brought with them a small keg of Getafix's magic potion, which imbues those who drink it with superhuman strength. Fanciacuppov tells the Gauls he had a vision that the Romans would invade to capture the griffin, which is his people's sacred animal, so he appeared to Getafix in a dream to request help. The Sarmatian village is a matriarchal society, in which the women are nomadic warriors, while the men stay at home to look after the children. The Sarmatian women announce the arrival of the Romans, who still have Kalashnikova as their hostage and reluctant guide. The Gauls cannot share their magic potion among the Sarmatians to defeat the Romans because the potion has frozen, rendering it useless. Fanciacuppov agrees to lead the Romans to the griffin in exchange for the release of Kalashnikova, his niece, although she continues to be held captive by the Romans. Asterix, Obelix and the Sarmatian women then follow the Romans, who are eventually led to a frozen lake, beneath which is a frozen Styracosaurus, which looks nothing like artistic depictions of the griffin.

A scuffle breaks out between the Roman leaders, into which Dogmatix brings a pack of ravenous wolves, forcing the Romans to flee. After visiting the Roman camp, to find that Kalashnikova has effected a cunning escape, the Gauls return to the Sarmatian village and then to their own village. Back in Rome, Caesar orders a giraffe be displayed, as there is no news of his expeditionary force.

== Special edition and teaser page ==
A deluxe edition of the book, only published in French, features additional pages that are not included in the ordinary edition. These include an early scene in the Gaulish village, in which Getafix dozes off during a chess game between Asterix and Obelix, and dreams that Fanciacuppov is in need of help. The dream prompts Getafix to awaken and shout the shaman's name. This scene, which originally appeared in January 2021 as a teaser page for the book, is a homage to the opening page of Tintin in Tibet, in which Tintin falls asleep during a chess game, dreams of a friend in trouble, awakens with a shout and decides to travel to a snow-covered land. The deluxe edition of Asterix and the Griffin also shows a scene in which Getafix levitates.

== Production ==
According to Uderzo's daughter, Sylvie, Uderzo had looked over the book's initial script and some of its early sketches, prior to his death in March 2020.

Ferri said a sculpture of the tarasque, a creature from Celtic legends, inspired him to question whether ancient people believed in peculiar monsters. "It's worth mentioning that in Roman times there weren't many explorers, so the terra was mostly incognita. Even so, extraordinary animals such as elephants and rhinoceroses had already been exhibited in Rome. Having seen them, why would Romans have any reason to doubt the existence of equally improbable creatures? And hadn't some of them (medusas, centaurs, gorgons…) been described very seriously before their time by the ancient Greeks?"

Prior to the book's publication, Ferri had said it would contain some subtle references to the COVID-19 pandemic, such as an allusion to a potion resembling a vaccine. He subsequently said there were few allusions to the pandemic "because it wasn't that funny".

== Critical reception ==
Writing in Le Figaro, Olivier Delcroix described the book as disappointing and boring, as "even the magic potion and the gentle irony of Goscinny and Uderzo are frozen".

French news magazine Marianne's reviewer Myriam Perfetti complained that Asterix himself had faded from the action in favor of secondary characters. She said the book is "entirely sung to the politically correct tune of the times" and is "a sort of Tintin in Tibet without a yeti, and the minimum amount of fights".

French online cultural journal Diakritik's reviewer, Dominique Bry, was more complimentary, praising the book for its puns, as well as its commentary on current affairs: fake news, conspiracy theories including flat Earth, shallow media and the condition of women. "Conrad and Ferri prove with good reason that even without a magic potion and against all odds, the journey continues," wrote Bry.

A review by The Indian Express complained about the "puzzling" omission of the teaser page, saying that part of the story starts "rather abruptly, with no real context", leaving readers confused. The same review also noted the Sarmatian cheesemaker initially named Wottastinkov is subsequently referred to as Viraloadov.

== Notes ==
- The Roman geographer Cartographus is a caricature of French novelist Michel Houellebecq.
- The speech of the Sarmatians is rendered with the letter e reversed, reminiscent of the Cyrillic alphabet.
- The presence of Amazonian women results in several puns on the Amazon online marketplace.
- The Romans' guides are Scythians, nomadic Eurasians, who speak mostly in the style of online tourism recommendations.
- The lower right corner of the final panel of the album shows a tearful owl departing the banquet. Ferri said this was a tribute to Uderzo, who had placed a crying rabbit in the final panel of Asterix in Belgium to mourn the passing of the series' original author, Rene Goscinny.
- The frozen Styracosaurus being assumed to be a griffin by the Romans is a reference to the theory of folklorist Adrienne Mayor, that the griffin was inspired by the discovery of fossilized Protoceratops remains.
