= Asterix and the Normans =

Comic book album

Asterix and the Normans (Astérix et les Normands)
- Cover of the English edition
- Date: 1967
- Main characters: Asterix and Obelix
- Series: Asterix

Creative team
- Writers: Rene Goscinny
- Artists: Albert Uderzo

Original publication
- Published in: Pilote magazine
- Issues: 340–361
- Date of publication: 1966
- Language: French

Chronology
- Preceded by: Asterix in Britain
- Followed by: Asterix the Legionary

Asterix and the Normans (French: Astérix et les Normands) is a French comic story, written by Rene Goscinny and illustrated by Albert Uderzo. It is the ninth story in the Asterix comic book series, and was originally published by Dargaud as a serial for Pilote magazine in 1966, before being released as a comic album in 1967.

The story focuses on Asterix and Obelix helping train up the nephew of their village chief, only to find themselves contending with a visit by men from the frozen north raiding their lands in search of learning about fear.

Asterix and the Normans received favourable reviews following its publication. An animated movie adaptation loosely based on the story, Asterix and the Vikings, was released in 2006.

== Plot summary ==
In the rebel village of Gauls in Armorica, Chief Vitalstatistix receives a message from his brother in Lutetia (present-day Paris) that his teenage nephew, Justforkix, is being sent to him in hopes he can be trained as a warrior. When he arrives in his chariot, Vitalstatistix holds a dance in his honor. Justforkix, unimpressed with the traditional music and dancing, snatches the lyre from the village bard Cacofonix and proceeds to perform a more energetic performance resembling rock music. While Cacofonix breaks up the performance - and gets promptly struck down by Fulliautomatix, the blacksmith, for resuming his music - Justforkix suggests his talents would be better appreciated in Lutetia.

Meanwhile, a tribe of Normans in the frozen northern lands struggle to understand the "meaning of fear". Their chief, Timandahaf, highlights a mistaken belief that knowing fear will give them the ability of flight, after mistakening the meaning of people "flying in fear". Seeking an answer, he arranges for a journey to lands that know fear to find the means of learning about it. Their ship eventually arrives in Gaul, and is spotted by Justforkix whilst he is being trained by Asterix and Obelix. When he attempts to warn the village about their arrival, he is shocked by the fact that everyone wants to fight them. When alone with Asterix and Obelix, he confides he is completely frightened by the presence of the Normans. Unknown to them, a Norman warrior overhears the conversation, and mistakenly believes Justforkix is an expert on fear.

After convincing Vitalstatistix to let him go home, Justforkix makes his way for Lutetia. But when his chariot breaks down thanks to a gift from Obelix, the Normans ambush him and bring him to Timandahaf. When the chief demands he teach the Normans fear, Justforkix fails to understand what he means in his frightened state, and is held prisoner. When Asterix and Obelix learn of his kidnapping, they promptly visit the Normans resulting in a fight with them, with a Roman patrol accidentally getting caught up in the moment when they investigate. Asterix eventually has a meeting with Timandahaf, who explains their mission to him, prompting him to send Obelix back to find Cacofonix. When he discover the bard has left the village, he smartly follows after him, suspecting he is heading for Lutetia. Finding him on the road, he swiftly convinces him to come back.

The pair return in time to find Asterix and Justforkix fighting against the Normans to prevent being thrown off a cliff. With Cacofonix amongst them, Asterix encourages the bard to sing for the Normans, which leads to the group being frightened. Although they thank the group for teaching them fear, Justforkix has the Gauls refuse his offer of a banquet. Angered, Timandahaf orders his men to attack, but the Gauls fight them off and make them return home, with a better understanding of fear. Returning to the village, Justforkix proves to have become a lot stronger and braver from the adventure, with Obelix offering to teach him more. Asterix later questions Getafix about the Normans' interest in fear, leading to the druid pointing out that to understand fear is to understand how to overcome it and experience true courage.

== Characters ==
- Asterix – Gaulish warrior, and the main protagonist of the story.
- Obelix – Gaulish menhir delivery man and warrior, and a close friend of Asterix.
- Dogmatix – Obelix's pet dog, who is loyal to him and Asterix. Rene Goscinny and Albert Uderzo fleshed out the character's personality with a new element focusing on a firm dislike of trees being uprooted.
- Getafix – Gaulish druid of the village, responsible for the superhuman magic potion they use.
- Vitalstatistix – Chief of the Gaulish village.
- Cacofonix – Gaulish bard of the village.
- Fulliautomatix – Gaulish blacksmith. Following his earlier appearances, Goscinny and Uderzo settled on his design for this comic being used for the series.
- Justforkix – Vitalstatistix's teenage cousin, and a reflection of modern teenage life. The character was later used in a series of Asterix gamebooks, that became popular in the 1980s.
- Timandahaf – Chief of the Normans, and a proud warrior.
- Oleaginus – An eager legionnary assigned to one of the Roman camps in Armorica.

== Cultural references ==
- In the French original, Justforkix makes mention of the work of "Elvix Preslix" - a pun on the name of rock musician Elvis Presley - and performs a piece by the bardic band "Les Monkiix" - a parody version of the rock band The Monkees. For the English version, the band was referred to as "The Rolling Menhirs" - a parody version of rock band The Rolling Stones.
- When Asterix inquires about Justforkix's sports car-like chariot, he states it was made in Mediolanum (present-day Milan). The line is a reference to the Italian motor industry and its production of sports cars.
- In one scene, Timandahaf explains to Asterix his people did not plan to start a war with Gaul, but states he will leave it to "our descendants". This is a reference to the 9th century invasion of northern France by Norsemen, who would later become the Normans and give rise to the name Normandy for the region they conquered. The comic makes reference to the stereotypes of Normandy cuisine, primarily recipes from the region that use cream.
- In the Finnish version, the title is "Asterix ja normannien maihinnousu", which is translated as "Asterix and the Landing of the Normans". The words "normannien maihinnousu" are a play on the Finnish history-book term "Normandian maihinnousu" that references the Normandy Landings of 1944.

== Adaptations ==
In 2006, an adaptation of Asterix and the Normans was produced under the title of Asterix and the Vikings. The film, a joint production between Danish and French film companies, loosely adapted the plot, adding new characters, including anachronistic references about modern technology, and featuring cover versions of pop songs.

Unlike previous animated adaptation, production was done in English first, rather than in French, with its cast including Paul Giamatti and Brad Garrett; while the French cast included Roger Carel and Jacques Frantz. The film received mixed reviews upon release, with praise on its animation quality and voice cast, but criticism of the script.

== In other languages ==
Alongside the French and English version, Asterix and the Normans has been translated into the following languages (complete with title translations):

- Afrikaans - Asterix en die Noormanne
- Brazilian Portuguese – Asterix e os Normandos
- Bengali – Asterix O Norman Dol ( অ্যাসটেরিক্স ও নর্ম্যান দল )
- Catalan – Astèrix i els Normands
- Croatian - Asterix i Normani
- Danish – Asterix og vikingerne
- Dutch – Asterix en de Noormannen
- Finnish – Asterix ja normannien maihinnousu
- German – Asterix und die Normannen
- Greek - Ο Αστερίξ και οι Νορμανδοί
- Italian – Asterix e i normanni
- Korean – 아스테릭스, 바이킹을물리치다
- Polish – Asteriks i Normanowie
- Portuguese – Astérix e os Normandos
- Serbian - Asteriks i Normani
- Spanish – Asterix y los normandos
- Swedish – Asterix och vikingarna
- Turkish – Asteriks ve Normanlar
