= Asterix and the Golden Sickle =

Comic book album

Asterix and the Golden Sickle (La Serpe D'or)
- Cover of the English edition
- Date: 1962
- Main characters: Asterix and Obelix
- Series: Asterix

Creative team
- Writers: René Goscinny
- Artists: Albert Uderzo

Original publication
- Published in: Pilote magazine
- Issues: 42–74
- Date of publication: 11 August 1960–1961
- Language: French

Translation
- Publisher: Brockhampton Press
- Date: 1975
- Translator: Anthea Bell and Derek Hockridge

Chronology
- Preceded by: Asterix the Gaul
- Followed by: Asterix and the Goths

Asterix and the Golden Sickle (also known as "The Golden Billhook" - translated from French: La Serpe D'or) is a French comic story, written by René Goscinny and illustrated by Albert Uderzo. It is the second story in the Asterix comic book series, and was originally published by Dargaud as a serial for Pilote magazine in 1960, before being later being published as a comic album in 1962.

The story focuses on Asterix, accompanied by his friend Obelix, as they attempt to acquire a golden sickle for their druid, only to find themselves dealing with a criminal consortium trying to profit from an illicit trade in them.

Following its publication, The Golden Sickle received favourable reviews, with Dargaud later planning an animated adaptation of the story; though they were forced to scrap the project after Goscinny and Uderzo blocked production following the company's animated adaptation of the previous comic story.

== Plot summary ==
One day in the forest outside the village of rebel Gauls in Armorica, Druid Getafix breaks his golden sickle. He explains to the villagers that this will prevent him attending the annual conference of druids, as well as making the magic potion that provides their superhuman strength to resist the Romans. Determined to resolve his dilema, Asterix and his friend Obelix vow to travel to Lutetia (the predecessor of present-day Paris), and secure a new golden sickle from Obelix's cousin Metallurgix, a renowned sicklesmith. On the journey to the city, the pair learn that Lutetia is currently suffering a shortage of golden sickles for unknown reasons.

Upon arriving in the city, Asterix and Obelix learn that Metallurgix has gone missing, and decide to spend the next day searching for information. This causes them to encounter Clovogarlix, a local rogue, who brings them to a club run by his superior, Navishtrix. After refusing to buy a golden sickle from him at an exorbitant price, the pair are forced to fight off Navishtrix's men. When the Romans raid the club, Navhistrix and Clovogarlix escape, while Asterix and Obelix are promptly arrested for their actions. When brought before the city's prefect, Surplus Dairyprodus, they are surprised when he releases them for providing him with good entertainment. As they leave his palace, his centurion informs the pair that Metallurgix may have been kidnapped by sickle traffickers, who have taken advantage of the sickle shortage in Lutetia.

Continuing their investigation, the pair track down Clovogarlix's house to search it for clues, but are arrested by the Romans again and thrown into jail. To their surprise, they encounter a drunkard in their cell who reveals that Navishtrix has a hideout concealed by a dolmen in the Boulogne forest. After Dairyprodus releases the Gauls once again, they head to the forest and find a trapdoor to an underground hideout, which contains a vast hoard of golden sickles. Before they can explore further, Navishtrix discovers them, and orders his men to apprehend them as he escapes. Following the fight, the pair interrogate Clovogarlix, who admits his boss is working for someone else. Tracking down Navishtrix, which results in another run-in with the Romans, the pair are shocked to discover the mastermind behind the sickle shortage is Dairyprodus.

The prefect freely confesses to them and his centurion that he did so for his own amusement, sponsoring Navishtrix's illegal sickle operation. Dairyprodus and Navishtrix are arrested, while Asterix and Obelix are released. Learning Metallurgix had been held in the prefect's dungeon, the pair rescue him, whereupon he greatly rewards them with one of his best golden sickles for Getafix. With this in hand, the pair return home to their village, which holds a banquet to celebrate the success of their adventure.

== Characters ==
- Asterix – Gaulish warrior, and the main protagonist of the story.
- Obelix – Gaulish menhir delivery man and warrior, and a close friend of Asterix. Following the first story, he was given more prominence for the plot of The Golden Sickle
- Getafix – Gaulish druid.
- Vitalstatistix – Chief of the Gaulish village.
- Cacofonix – Gaulish bard of the village. Goscinny and Uderzo used this novel to establish a recurring gag in which Cacofonix's singing is disliked, and that he is tied up most of the time for the banquet at the end of each story.
- Surplus Dairyprodus – Prefect of Lutetia. The character's appearance was based upon the real-life actor Charles Laughton, who was known for playing Roman statesmen.
- Navishtrix – Ringleader of a syndicate running an illegal sickle operation.
- Clovogarlix – Navishtrix's second-in-command, responsible for dealing with troublemakers.
- Metallurgix – A sicklesmith in Lutetia, and Obelix's cousin.

A caricature of French cartoonist Jean Graton makes an appearance as an ox cart competitor in one panel.

== Cultural References and Development Notes ==
- In a scene of the comic, Asterix and Obelix encounter competitors taking part in the "Suindinum 24 hours" ox-cart race. The event is a reference to France's 24 Hours of Le Mans sports car race, with Suindinum being the ancient name for Le Mans.
- When the comic was originally released, fans noted that Uderzo made an error with his illustrations, causing pages after the page 36 to be drawn with smaller panels in comic strip format, resulting in larger margins on those pages in the printed comic book.

== Cancelled Adaptation ==
Following the completion of the first Asterix animated film, Asterix the Gaul (1967), Dargaud had planned to create a second film based on The Gold Sickle. However, Goscinny and Uderzo were not impressed with their first film, which they reluctantly allowed to be released, and firmly rejected any work to be done on the proposed film with the company's animation team. As a result, Dargaud scrapped the project at the pair's request.

== In other languages ==
Apart from French and English, the comic was published in the following languages (which includes the title translation):

- Arabic: أستريكس والمنجل الذهبي
- Bengali: 'এসটেরিক্স ও সোনার কাস্তে
- Bulgarian: Златният сърп
- Catalan: La falç d'or
- Croatian: Asteriks i Zlatni srp
- Czech: Asterix a Zlatý srp
- Danish: Asterix og trylledrikken
- Dutch: Asterix en het gouden snoeimes
- Estonian: Asterix ja Kuldsirp
- Finnish: Kultainen sirppi
- West Frisian: De gouden sichte
- Galician: O fouciño de ouro
- German: Die goldene Sichel
- Greek: Το χρυσό δρεπάνι
- Hungarian: Az aranysarló
- Indonesian: Asterix dan Sabit Emas
- Irish: Asterix agus an Corrán Óir
- Italian: Asterix e il falcetto d'oro
- Latin: Falx aurea
- Latvian: Asteriks un zelta sirpis
- Norwegian: Asterix og styrkedråpene
- Polish: Złoty sierp
- Portuguese: Asterix e a Foice de Ouro
- Romanian: Asterix si Cosorul de Aur
- Russian: золотой серп
- Scots: Asterix and the Gowden Heuk
- Serbian: Астерикс и златни срп/Zlatni srp
- Slovak: Asterix a zlatý kosák
- Spanish: La hoz de oro
- Swedish: Asterix och guldskäran
- Turkish: Asteriks Altın orak
