= How Obelix Fell into the Magic Potion When He Was a Little Boy =

Story in the French comic series Asterix

How Obelix Fell into the Magic Potion When he was a Little Boy (Comment Obélix est tombé dans la marmite du druide quand il était petit)
- Date: 1989
- Series: Asterix

Creative team
- Writers: René Goscinny
- Artists: Albert Uderzo

Original publication
- Date of publication: 1989
- Language: French

How Obelix Fell into the Magic Potion When he was a Little Boy (French: Comment Obélix est tombé dans la marmite du druide quand il était petit, "How Obelix Fell into the Druid's Cooking Pot When He Was Small") is an Asterix story written by René Goscinny and originally published in the French magazine Pilote issue 291 (1965), with only a few drawings. In 1989, it was fully illustrated by Albert Uderzo and published in an album as a comic book with illustrations.

== Plot summary ==
The story is narrated by Asterix, apparently to the conventional readers, and informs that in childhood, Obelix was often bullied by other boys, until Asterix, to help his courage, induced him to drink some of the magic potion that made the villagers invincible. When they are interrupted in the act, Obelix falls into the cauldron containing the potion, and drinks it all, and is thereafter permanently under its influence.

== Notes ==
- Obeliscoidix (original French: Obélodalix), Obelix's father, is shown to enjoy collecting the helmets of Roman legionaries - a hobby Obelix enjoys as an adult.
- Vitalstatistix, who is a generation older than Asterix and Obelix, is already the village's young chief, albeit slimmer (similar to his appearance toward the end of Asterix and the Chieftain's Shield). In the background of one picture in the book, the silhouetted figure of a child is depicted being carried by a shield in the manner of Vitalstatistix.
- Throughout the story, Obelix is seen pulling a small white wooden toy dog that resembles Dogmatix.
- The 24-year gap between the story text and most illustrations leads to some inconsistencies between the two, and also with the rest of the Asterix stories (mostly minor and relating to the chief).
- Prior to falling into the cauldron, Obelix is shy and pacifistic - possibly because the other boys pick on him. He gains his characteristic love of fighting after getting his own back, because he now knows that he can get his-own back in retaliation, and is also shown to have taken on some other characteristics he is well known for as an adult - at the conclusion of the story the village children enjoy a miniature banquet, in which Cacofonix is tied to a tree and gagged for the first time, and someone comments "Fat lot of good fighting you, Obelix.", to which Obelix angrily retorts "WHO ARE YOU CALLING FAT?!"

== Publication ==
- The book had been out of print in English for a decade but was re-released in October 2009 with a new cover.

== Adaptation ==
The first episode of the 2025 Netflix miniseries Asterix and Obelix: The Big Fight is loosely based on that story.

== In other languages ==
- French: Comment Obélix est tombé dans la marmite du druide quand il était petit
- Croatian: Kako je Obelix upao u kotao kad je bio dječak
- Czech: Jak Obelix spadl do druidova kotle, když byl malý
- Danish: Hvordan Obelix faldt i gryden som barn
- Dutch: Hoe de kleine Obelix in de ketel van de Druïde viel
- Finnish: Kuinka Obelix putosi pienenä tietäjän taikajuomapataan
- Galician: Como caeu Obélix na marmita do druída cando era cativo
- German: Wie Obelix als kleines Kind in den Zaubertrank geplumpst ist
- Greek: Πώς ο Οβελίξ έπεσε στη χύτρα του Δρυΐδη όταν ήταν μικρός
- Italian: Come fu che Obelix cadde da piccolo nel paiolo del druido
- Norwegian: Hvordan Obelix falt oppi trollmannens gryte da han var liten
- Polish: Jak Obeliks wpadł do kociołka kiedy był mały
- Portuguese: Como Obelix caiu no caldeirão do druida quando era pequeno
- Serbian: Како је Обеликс упао у чаробни напитак
- Spanish: Cómo Obélix se cayó en la marmita del druida cuando era pequeño
- Turkish: Oburiks küçük bir çocukken kudret şerbeti kazanına nasıl düştü
