= Asterix and the Cauldron =

Comic book album

Asterix and the Cauldron (Asterix et le Chaudron)
- Date: 1976
- Series: Asterix

Creative team
- Writers: Rene Goscinny
- Artists: Albert Uderzo

Original publication
- Date of publication: 1969
- Language: French

Chronology
- Preceded by: Asterix at the Olympic Games
- Followed by: Asterix in Spain

Asterix and the Cauldron is the thirteenth volume of the Asterix comic book series, by René Goscinny (stories) and Albert Uderzo (illustrations). It was first serialized in the magazine Pilote, issues 469–491, in 1968, and translated into English in 1976.

== Plot summary ==
The story introduces Chief Whosemoralsarelastix, the chief of a neighboring Gaulish village: a miser who often does business with the Romans. When the Romans levy new taxes, Whosemoralsarelastix asks the people of Asterix's village to guard a cauldron full of sestertii, ostensibly to keep the money away from the imminent visit of the Roman tax collectors. Despite Asterix keeping watch, the cauldron is stolen during the night, whereupon the strict laws of the Gauls demand that Asterix be banished until he has atoned for his negligence. Obelix immediately "banishes" himself to accompany Asterix, until they find money to refill the cauldron and repay Whosemoralsarelastix.

Asterix and Obelix engage in many futile attempts to earn back the money: questioning the Romans at Compendium (only to start a riot when the Romans know nothing about the theft), attacking the pirates in the belief that they stole the money (after the pirates have converted their ship into a restaurant), selling boars (at a ridiculously low price), prize fighting (only to win worthless statuettes), acting (foiled when Obelix insults the audience and ruins the company), gambling on a chariot race (only to lose their money on false information), and even trying to rob a bank (which is empty of money after the recent tax increases). With little else to gain or lose, they take the cauldron back to Whosemoralsarelastix's village, Asterix hoping to save the village's honour by clarifying that he alone is responsible for the loss. En route they rob a Roman tax collector of sufficient money to fill the cauldron; and Asterix catches an onion-like scent on the coins, recalling that the cauldron had previously been used for cooking onion soup, and thus proving that these are the very coins seized from Asterix's care.

At Whosemoralsarelastix's village, on a high cliff at the coast, Asterix confronts Whosemoralsarelastix with the onion-smelling money, having correctly guessed that Whosemoralsarelastix stole back his own money in the hope that Asterix, to repay the supposed debt, would reimburse him. Here, Asterix and Whosemoralsarelastix duel with their swords (Asterix having exhausted the magic potion granting him superior strength), while Obelix repels Whosemoralsarelastix's followers. When Whosemoralsarelastix wins the duel and prepares to kill Asterix, a section of the cliff beneath his feet suddenly gives way, and the cauldron falls toward the ocean while Whosemoralsarelastix hangs above. Asterix then rescues Whosemoralsarelastix and re-unites with Obelix, with whom he returns home.

The money itself falls into the ship and possession of the pirates. At Asterix's village, a celebration is held for the return of the two heroes and the recovery of their honour.

== Commentary ==
- When Obelix suggests they get paid by telling people their adventures, Asterix rejects the idea as unlikely to raise any money. The joke is that, by this time, the series had made Goscinny and Uderzo very wealthy.
- When Roman dignitaries assemble at the theatre, Uderzo (in Roman costume) is shown talking to the Prefect, while Goscinny, on the right, amuses his neighbours with jokes.
- The tax collector in the book appears to be a caricature of Valéry Giscard d'Estaing, then the French minister of finance, who later became president.
- Two of the actors in the theatre are named Laurensolivius and Alecginus.
- This is the first and only volume in which the pirates enjoy a happy ending, and the first of the few rare stories where their ship is not sunk (though they have already taken a beating earlier in this episode).
- The fight at the end of the story is one of the rare times Asterix is seen using his sword, although he always carries it with him.
- Asterix's unraveling of the plot is a reference to the Roman proverb Pecunia non olet ("money does not stink").
- In earlier editions, the colour of the breeches of the Roman legionaries changed from white to red.

== In other languages ==
- Arabic: أستريكس و القدر المعدنية
- Catalan: Astèrix i el calderó
- Croatian: Asterix i kotlić
- Czech: Asterix a kotlík
- Dutch: Asterix en de koperen ketel ("Asterix and the Copper Cauldron")
- Estonian: Asterix ja rahapada ("Asterix and the Cauldron of Money")
- Finnish: Asterix ja rahapata ("Asterix and the Cauldron of Money")
- German: Asterix und der Kupferkessel
- Greek: Ο Αστερίξ και η χύτρα
- Hebrew: אסטריקס והקלחת
- Icelandic: Ástríkur og grautarpotturinn
- Indonesian: "Asterix dan Panci Sup Bawang" ("Asterix and the Cauldron of Onion Soup")
- Italian: Asterix e il Paiolo
- Norwegian: Asterix på skattejakt ("Asterix on a Treasure Hunt")
- Persian: Asterix va deeg-che
- Polish: Asteriks i kociołek
- Portuguese: Astérix e o Caldeirão
- Serbian: Asteriks i ukradeno kazanče (Asterix and the Stolen Cauldron)
- Slovenian: Asterix in kotliček
- Spanish: Astérix y el caldero
- Swedish: Asterix och skatten ("Asterix and the Treasure" or "Asterix and the Tax", skatt meaning both treasure and tax)
- Turkish: Asteriks ve Kazan
