= Asterix and the Goths =

Comic book album

Asterix and the Goths (Astérix et les Goths)
- Cover of the English edition
- Date: 1963
- Main characters: Asterix and Obelix
- Series: Asterix

Creative team
- Writers: René Goscinny
- Artists: Albert Uderzo

Original publication
- Published in: Pilote magazine
- Issues: 82–122
- Date of publication: 1961–1962
- Language: French

Translation
- Publisher: Brockhampton Press
- Date: 1975
- Translator: Anthea Bell and Derek Hockridge

Chronology
- Preceded by: Asterix and the Golden Sickle
- Followed by: Asterix the Gladiator

Asterix and the Goths (French: Astérix et les Goths) is a French comic story, written by René Goscinny and illustrated by Albert Uderzo. It is the third story in the Asterix comic book series, and was originally published by Dargaud as a serial for Pilote magazine in 1962, before being later released as a comic album in 1963.

The story focuses on Asterix and Obelix travelling into the lands of the Goths in Germania in order to rescue their druid from his kidnappers, who seek his power to conquer the Gauls and the Romans.

Following its publication, Uderzo regretted the Germanophobic tone of the story, which led to him and Goscinny changing how German characters appeared in the series in later stories. While several translations were made, including an English version in 1974, one translation for West Germany later drew criticism from the creators for including political propaganda and had to be reprinted as a result.

== Plot summary ==
Asterix and Obelix travel with their druid Getafix, as he heads from the Gaulish village in Armorica to attend the annual druids' conference in the Forest of the Carnutes. During their journey, the pair meet with Getafix's British friend Valueaddedtax, a fellow druid, before encountering a Roman patrol who warn them that a band of Goths have recently crossed the border into Gaul. Whilst Asterix and Obelix are forced to wait outside the forest, as the conference does not allow non-druids to attend, Getafix wins first prize in a contest regarding druidic inventions by impressing the others with his magic potion that gives superhuman strength.

As he leaves the conference to reunite with his friends, Getafix is kidnapped by the Goths, led by Choleric, who had been spying on the druids with the intention of finding a powerful druid amongst them who could help the Goths conquer both Gaul and Rome. When Asterix and Obelix learn Getafix is missing, they join Valueaddedtax to search around where he was heading, and discover a Visigoth helmet. Realizing his predicament, the pair set off in pursuit, only to encounter a Roman patrol in the process who mistakenly believe they are Goths. To avoid capture, the Gauls knock out two Roman soldiers and steal their uniforms, which soon sows confusion amongst the Romans, all while failing to stop the real Goths from escaping.

Forced to cross the border between Gaul and Germania, the pair knock out a pair of Goths and steal their clothing to disguise themselves once again. Tracking down Getafix to a Gothic garrison, the pair accidentally get imprisoned after angering the garrison commander, but find themselves thrown into a cell with a Goth named Rhetoric – a translator who was helping the Goth's chief, Metric, convince Getafix to use his powers for him, but had to falsify his translations when Getafix refused in Gaulish (despite being able to speak in Gothic). After breaking out of the garrison, the pair discover Rhetoric speaks Gaulish and force him to lead them to their druid.

After allowing themselves to be captured, the pair are imprisoned with Getafix, who in turn exposes Rhetoric for lying to Metric, leading the translator to be thrown in with them. Discussing their situation, Getafix reveals what the Goths are planning to do, and decides they must prevent a major war breaking out by forcing the Goths to fight amongst themselves. After enduring attempts to torture them, the Gauls trick Rhetoric and Metric into fighting each other for leading as chief, giving them magic potion to do so, and then trick other Goths that they should be chief. The resulting chaos this causes prompts the Goths to abandon their plans of invasion and creates a civil war amongst them. Satisfied with this, Asterix and his friends return home to their village, where everyone delights in their safe return and host a banquet in celebration.

== Characters ==
- Asterix – Gaulish warrior, and the main protagonist of the story.
- Obelix – Gaulish menhir delivery man and warrior, and a close friend of Asterix.
- Getafix – Gaulish druid.
- Vitalstatistix – Chief of the Gaulish village.
- Valueaddedtax – A British druid, and a friend of Getafix.
- Chief Metric – A chieftain of the Goths.
- Choleric – A warrior who serves Metric.
- Rhetoric – A Gothic translator prized for his ability to translate other languages.

== Authorial issues & controversies ==
Following the publication of Asterix and the Goths, Albert Uderzo expressed regret over the portrayal of the Goths in the story – both he and Goscinny depicted the Goths as villainous characters as a way of mocking them and the Germans themselves following their defeat at the end of World War II. Uderzo felt the Germanophobic tone of the characters was wrong, and decided in future for all Germanic characters in future to be portrayed as more sympathetic.

The publication later drew controversy, when work on the translation of the comic for West Germany led to its translators opting to include political propaganda against East Germany, without Goscinny and Uderzo's knowledge. When the Astérix creators were alerted to this, they immediately ordered a halt on all sales of the translation until the West German translation was reprinted without the propaganda content.
