= Asterix and the Soothsayer =

Comic book album

Asterix and the Soothsayer (Le Devin)
- Date: 1975
- Series: Asterix

Creative team
- Writers: Rene Goscinny
- Artists: Albert Uderzo

Original publication
- Date of publication: 1972
- Language: French

Chronology
- Preceded by: Asterix and the Laurel Wreath
- Followed by: Asterix in Corsica

Asterix and the Soothsayer (French: Le Devin, "The Diviner") is the nineteenth volume of the Asterix comic book series, by René Goscinny (stories) and Albert Uderzo (illustrations). It was originally serialized in Pilote issues 652-673 in 1972.

In this story, Prolix the soothsayer claims that the village of the Gauls will become polluted by a divine curse. Asterix thinks that the man is a charlatan, and his fellow villagers are concerned about sacrilege.

== Plot summary ==
Frightened by a thunderstorm, the Gauls — with the exception of Getafix, who is at his annual druid meeting — are huddled in the chief's hut, when they are visited by a soothsayer, called Prolix, who predicts that "when the storm is over, the weather will improve" and additionally predicts a fight (caused by the villagers' habitual argument over the over-ripeness of fish sold by fishmonger Unhygienix). Asterix alone correctly identifies the soothsayer as a charlatan.

Upon Prolix's departure, the chief's wife Impedimenta preserves him in hiding near the village, where she and the other villagers question him at will; forbidding only Asterix and Obelix. Later, Obelix eludes Impedimenta and, upon encountering Prolix, chases him up a tree. Prolix diverts him by claiming to see a vision of a beautiful woman who loves warriors matching Obelix's description. Obelix returns to the village and almost instantly falls for Mrs. Geriatrix. Prolix meanwhile is arrested by an optio, who brings Prolix before the centurion (Voluptuous Arteriosclerosus) of the Roman camp Compendium, who decides to use the imposter's persuasive skills against the Gauls. Upon Impedimenta's discovery of Asterix near Prolix's camp, consternation spreads among the villagers on grounds of a threatened sacrilege. At the Romans' behest, Prolix returns, claiming dramatically that soon the air in the village will become polluted by a divine curse. Terrified, most of the villagers flee to a nearby island for the curse to exhaust itself, while Asterix, Obelix and Dogmatix stay behind.

The Romans soon arrive to claim the village, while Asterix and Obelix hide in the undergrowth. Getafix returns from his conference, and upon hearing of the situation, turns Prolix's ruse against him by creating and spreading a foul-smelling mixture of gasses. These expel the Romans, Prolix, and Cacofonix the Bard, who returns to the other Gauls on the island to confirm Prolix's prophecy. Prolix himself is perplexed by this confirmation, while the Centurion sends word to Caesar that "all of Gaul is now conquered"; and hoping to become dictator himself, he has the soothsayer tell him exaggerated stories of the luxuries emperors enjoy. Getafix, Asterix and Obelix join the other villagers on the island, where Getafix reveals he created the "foul air" that expelled the Romans; but Impedimenta and the other women remain convinced Prolix was genuine, on grounds of his having flattered them in earlier predictions. Asterix therefore determines to take the soothsayer by surprise and thus prove him fallible.

To this end, the Gaulish men and women attack the Roman camp together; and when Centurion Voluptuous Arteriosclerosus demands to know why Prolix did not warn him of this, the latter admits his ignorance. Convinced of the soothsayer's fraudulence, Impedimenta beats him and Arteriosclerosus. Returning to the village, the Gauls meet Bulbus Crocus, an envoy of Julius Caesar's, come to confirm Arteriosclerosus's claim that the village is conquered, and expel him. In the Roman camp, Crocus demotes Arteriosclerosus from a Centurion to a common soldier, who is then commanded by the Optio (who he used to be in charge of) to clean the camp alone. Prolix is expelled from the camp, swears to give up soothsaying, and is driven away by a thunderstorm. The Gaulish village is soon at peace, with the exception of Cacofonix, who still daydreams of himself as a famous singer.

== Commentary ==
- With a more adult-theme which started with Asterix and the Roman Agent, the story revolves around the superstitions of the people at the time (Gauls and Romans alike) and of today, and parodies the general gullibility of humanity.
- The story includes (page 9) an illustration of the Roman and Gaulish pantheon of gods. In that illustration, Uderzo includes a drawing of his own country home, and a soothsayer's fantastical prediction of the future is illustrated by a photograph of La Défense, the modern district of skyscrapers outside Paris.
- The scene at the bottom of page 10, where the characters observe the disembowelment of a fish, is a reproduction of Rembrandt's painting Anatomy Lesson of Dr. Nicolaes Tulp.
- Unhygienix, though depicted bare-footed in the series, can be seen on the cover wearing the brown footwear that the other male villagers wear. These are also seen in page 5, during the beginning of the storm scene, but is shown barefooted in the remainder of the book.
- On page 9, an Augur tells Caesar that "as long as Brutus is near you...you will have nothing to fear", in the authors' reference to Caesar's murder by his hands.

== Film adaptation ==
In 1989, the book was adapted into the inaccurately-named Asterix and the Big Fight, which encompassed only a few plot elements from the book it was actually named after.

Part of the plot was also used in the first live-action Asterix film, Asterix and Obelix vs Caesar.

== In other languages ==
- Arabic: أستريكس والعراف
- Basque: Aztia
- Catalan: L'endeví
- Croatian: Žrec (pagan priest)
- Czech: Věštec
- Dutch: De ziener
- Finnish: Asterix ja ennustaja
- German: Der Seher
- Greek: Ο μάντης
- Icelandic: Ástríkur og falsspámaðurinn
- Irish: Asterix agus an Fear Feasa
- Italian: Asterix e l'Indovino
- Norwegian: Spåmannen
- Portuguese: O Adivinho
- Polish: Wróżbita
- Serbian: Vrač pogađač (The Guessing Wizard)
- Spanish: El Adivino
- Welsh: Asterix a'r Argoel Fawr
