= Asterix Omnibus =

2020 collection of Asterix comics

Publication information
- Publisher: Papercutz
- Format: Hardcover; Softcover; Digital comic
- Genre: Historical fiction Humor
- Publication date: July 2020
- No. of issues: 13 to date
- Main character(s): Asterix; Obelix; Dogmatix

Creative team
- Written by: René Goscinny, Jean-Yves Ferri
- Artist(s): Albert Uderzo, Didier Conrad

Asterix Omnibus is a book series collecting the complete run of the Franco-Belgian bande dessinée comic Asterix, created by René Goscinny and Albert Uderzo. The series is available in both softcover trade paperbacks and in hardcover volumes, in conjunction with digital distribution. The publisher behind the project is Papercutz, which released the first volume of the series in July 2020.

== Background ==
In November 2019 it was announced that the American publisher Papercutz would take over the American licence for Asterix and that it would begin to reprint all of its stories in an Omnibus series beginning in 2020. Future volumes were said to be planned for release at a pace of four volumes per year. The first two volumes were initially planned to be released simultaneously on May 19, 2020. However, due to the 2020 COVID-19 pandemic, the release date was pushed forward to July of the same year. The first volume Asterix Omnibus Vol. 1 was finally launched for the United States market on July 14, 2020, with a print run of 20,000 hardcover copies plus an additional 50,000 softcover copies.

== Format ==
The Omnibus series is available in two versions: a hardcover and a softcover edition, both with identical contents. Each Omnibus contains three original Asterix albums. This choice was made by Papercutz owner Terry Nantier based on the assumption that the original European format of 48 pages per Asterix album would not work well in the United States audience, which is used to the graphic novel format, usually containing hundreds of pages per volume. The volumes are printed in full color throughout. The album covers have been redesigned and have new dimensions which are smaller than previous editions for the American market. The page count per volume averages 160 pages.

=== Reproduction ===
Hachette, the rightsholder to Asterix, has generally opposed changes made to the artwork for this reprint, but agreed to subtle changes in some character portrayals, especially to tone down the original comics' racist depiction of African people. In August 2020, Nantier said that he continues to negotiate with Hachette on the topic of providing context about the history of racial representation in each volume.

=== Translation ===
The text for the series has been newly translated to American English by Joe Johnson, professor of French and Spanish at Clayton State University, Georgia, directly from the original French source material, in order to make it more appropriate for an American audience. Previous versions of Asterix, distributed in the United States by Orion Books (an imprint of Hachette), used a British English translation. Nantier has stated that the new Americanized translation is expected to help attract new readers, especially younger ones.

The new translation by Johnson has been described as more streamlined and accessible than the previous translations, including simplifications such as changing the phrase "And now I declare the revels open!" to "Let the party begin!". Many of the comics' characteristic puns have been retouched in order to reach a contemporary audience, while retaining their original meanings. Additionally, sound effects have been changed to ones that are common in current comics; "Kerplonk!", used when a rock lands on the ground, has been replaced with "Thuddd". An effort to make many of the European and Latin references more understandable for American readers has also been made. Expressions and phrases in Latin are unchanged and accompanied by translations found in the page margins.

Some characters names have been changed in the new translation, the most prominent of which is the druid Getafix, now named Panoramix. Some minor characters have also been subject to changes, mainly to get the puns hidden in their names across better to the modern American audience.

== Volumes ==
Volumes
Volume	Release date	Title	Original publication years	Collected albums	Writer	Artist	Page count	ISBN Hardcover	ISBN Softcover
1	2020-07-14	Asterix Omnibus Vol. 1	1959-1962	Asterix the Gaul; Asterix and the Golden Sickle; Asterix and the Goths	René Goscinny	Albert Uderzo	160	978-1-54580-565-7	978-1-54580-566-4
2	2020-07-14	Asterix Omnibus Vol. 2	1964-1965	Asterix the Gladiator; Asterix and the Banquet; Asterix and Cleopatra	René Goscinny	Albert Uderzo	160	978-1-54580-567-1	978-1-54580-568-8
3	2020-10-20	Asterix Omnibus Vol. 3	1966	Asterix and the Big Fight; Asterix in Britain; Asterix and the Normans	René Goscinny	Albert Uderzo	160	978-1-54580-570-1	978-1-54580-571-8
4	2021-04-01	Asterix Omnibus Vol. 4	1967-1968	Asterix the Legionary; Asterix and the Chieftain's Shield; Asterix at the Olympic Games	René Goscinny	Albert Uderzo	151	978-1-54580-628-9	
5	2021-06-01	Asterix Omnibus Vol. 5	1969-1970	Asterix and the Cauldron; Asterix in Spain; Asterix and the Roman Agent	René Goscinny	Albert Uderzo	152	978-1-54580-693-7	
6	2021-08-01	Asterix Omnibus Vol. 6	1970-1971	Asterix in Switzerland; The Mansions of the Gods; Asterix and the Laurel Wreath	René Goscinny	Albert Uderzo	152		978-1-54580-703-3
7		Asterix Omnibus Vol. 7	1972-1974	Asterix and the Soothsayer; Asterix in Corsica; Asterix and Caesar's Gift	René Goscinny	Albert Uderzo	152	978-1-44400-835-7	978-1-44400-836-4
8		Asterix Omnibus Vol. 8	1975-1979	Asterix and the Great Crossing; Obelix and Co. Asterix in Belgium	René Goscinny	Albert Uderzo	152	978-1-44400-837-1	978-1-44400-838-8
9		Asterix Omnibus Vol. 9	1981-1983	Asterix and the Great Divide; Asterix and the Black Gold; Asterix and Son	René Goscinny	Albert Uderzo	152	978-1-44400-967-5	978-1-44400-966-8
10		Asterix Omnibus Vol. 10	1987-1996	Asterix and the Magic Carpet; Asterix and the Secret Weapon; Asterix and Obelix All at Sea	René Goscinny	Albert Uderzo	152		978-1-44400-425-0
11		Asterix Omnibus Vol. 11	2001-2005	Asterix and the Actress; Asterix and the Class Act; Asterix and the Falling Sky	René Goscinny	Albert Uderzo	161		978-1-44400-426-7
12		Asterix Omnibus Vol. 12	2009-2015	Asterix and Obelix's Birthday; Asterix and the Picts; Asterix and the Missing Scroll	René Goscinny	Albert Uderzo	161		978-1-51010-723-6
13	2022-11-08	Asterix Omnibus Vol. 13	2017-2021	Asterix and the Chariot Race; Asterix and the Chieftain's Daughter; Asterix and the Griffin	René Goscinny & Jean-Yves Ferri	Albert Uderzo & Didier Conrad	156		978-1-40872-595-5

== Related ==
Free Comic Book Day 2020

In conjunction with the premiere of the reprint series, Papercutz participated in the Free Comic Book Day 2020 promotional campaign with a free comic issue titled Asterix Free Comic Book Day Special. Due to the 2020 COVID-19 pandemic, this issue was released on July 15, 2020, as the date of the Free Comic Book Day was changed to take place over the course of the summer, instead of the usual single day in May.
