= English translations of Asterix =

English translations of French comics series

All the Asterix stories, created by René Goscinny and Albert Uderzo, have been translated into English. The vast majority of the albums were translated by Anthea Bell and Derek Hockridge. Their first volume, Asterix the Gaul, was published by Brockhampton Press in 1969. Bell retired in 2016 due to ill health and died in 2018; Hockridge died in 2013. Adriana Hunter currently serves as translator, with Asterix and the Chariot Race being her debut.

== Translating names ==
In the Asterix stories, many of the original French names are humorous due to their absurdity. For example, the bard is Assurancetourix (assurance tous risques or "comprehensive insurance"), the translation of which is pointless since the bard has no connection to insurance of any kind – it is the silliness that makes it humorous. To maintain the spirit and flow of the story the translators change the joke in the name to a comment on the character. Thus in the English language edition the bard's name is Cacofonix which is an allusion to the term cacophony (a discordant and meaningless mixture of sounds), since the central trait of the bard character is that the Gauls all hate listening to his singing voice. This carries on, though more clumsily, with his other two English names, "Malacoustix" or "Stopthemusix".

This happens in the original as well, as with Geriatrix (French: Agecanonix – canonical age – a French expression meaning very old or ancient), but it is not common, while absurd names in English, such as Dubius Status, are reserved for minor or one-story characters. Fictional place names however tend to be equally silly in all translations, for example the four camps (castra) which surround Asterix's village: Compendium, Aquarium, Laudanum and Totorum (Tot o' rum, colloquial English for shot of rum) – in French this camp is called "Babaorum", a pun on baba au rhum or rum baba, a popular French pastry. (In one of the American translations, one of these camps is named Nohappimedium.)

== Lost in translation ==
Bell and Hockridge were widely praised for their rendition of the English language versions, maintaining the spirit and humour of the French original even when direct translation is impossible – as it often is when translating puns between languages which are not closely related. A good example occurs in Asterix and the Chieftain's Shield when Obelix redistributes the water in the spa pools by diving in, the other guests complain and the druid in charge arrives asking Vitalstatistix, "Where are your Gauls?" In the original French he responds Mes Gaulois sont dans la pleine ("My Gauls are in the full one") which is a play on a famous (in French) quote Les Gaulois sont dans la plaine ("The Gauls are on the plain") which sounds exactly the same, though not in English. Instead the translated reply is "Pooling your resources" (the water), a clever double entendre on a common phrase even though the original pun is lost.

Sometimes, nothing of the original joke is salvageable. In Asterix in Britain, there is a scene in Londinium where a greengrocer argues with a buyer; in the next panel, Obelix says (in French), "Why is that man wearing a melon?" This relies on the fact that the French word for melon is also the name for the iconic British bowler hat; with no way to convey this in the English translation, in the British edition Obelix says, "I say, Asterix, I think this bridge is falling down" (a reference to the children's rhyme "London Bridge Is Falling Down"), leaving the original joke incomplete. In the preceding panel, the reply of the British man was, in some publications of the book, "Rather, old fruit!"; a good pun and typical of the way the British address each other in Asterix in Britain. In the same album, much of the humor came from Goscinny's high-fidelity rendition of the English language using French words. This, of course, is totally lost by re-translation into English, but compensated for by making the British characters speak in an antiquated, early-twentieth-century style.

Sometimes, the translators even go further and add their own humor when it is appropriate. An example of this is in Asterix and the Goths, where a group of Goths who kidnapped Getafix run puzzled through a forest populated by Romans looking for Asterix and Obelix, who they think are responsible for the kidnapping. In the original, the Goth chief says "Faut pas chercher à comprendre", meaning "We shouldn't try to understand", a common French phrase with no particular pun attached. In the English version, the chief instead comments "Ours is not to reason why", a reference to "The Charge of the Light Brigade" by Alfred, Lord Tennyson, which states in its third stanza "Theirs not to reason why/Theirs but to do and die".

== Comparison of names of major characters ==
Original name (French)	Meaning	Description	British name	American name (newspaper)	American name (album)
Astérix	asterisk (because he is the star), also because he is a small man, like an asterisk footnote *.	Gaulish warrior	Asterix	Asterix	Asterix
Obélix	obelisk (An ancient Egyptian large, heavy stone column similar to a menhir; and also the obelisk symbol † often used for footnotes like the asterisk.)	Menhir delivery man	Obelix	Obelix	Obelix
Idéfix	idée fixe (literally "fixed idea", meaning obsession)	Obelix's dog	Dogmatix	Dogmatix	Dogmatix
Panoramix	Panoramique (panoramic)	Druid	Getafix	Readymix	Magigimmix
Abraracourcix	à bras raccourcis: literally "with shortened arms" (French phrase meaning roughly "with all his might")	Village Chief	Vitalstatistix	Vitalstatistix	Macroeconomix
Bonemine	Bonne mine (good looks)	Chief's Wife	Impedimenta	n/a	Belladonna
Agecanonix	âge canonique (canonical age)	Village elder	Geriatrix	Geriatrix	Arthritix
Assurancetourix	Assurance tous risques (comprehensive insurance)	Bard	Cacofonix	Cacofonix	Malacoustix
Cétautomatix	c'est automatique (it's automatic)	Blacksmith	Fulliautomatix		
Ordralfabétix	ordre alphabétique (alphabetical order)	Fishmonger	Unhygienix	Fishtix	Epidemix
Iélosubmarine	Yellow Submarine	Wife of Fishmonger	Bacteria		
Falbala	falbala, a furbelow; a pejorative meaning frilly ornamention to a dress	Minor recurring character	Panacea	n/a	Philharmonia

In earlier translations, such as in Valiant and Ranger/Look and Learn (see below), other versions of names have appeared.

== Other English-language translations and versions ==
=== Valiant comic ===
An edited-down version of Asterix the Gaul appeared in Valiant, a boys' comic published by Fleetway Publications, beginning in the issue dated 16 November 1963. It appeared in colour on the back page. Set in the Britain of 43AD, the strip was originally called Little Fred and Big Ed. Little Fred and stonemason Big Ed lived in the village of Nevergivup which was surrounded by eight Roman camps: Harmonium, Cranium, Pandemonium, Premium, Rostrum, Aquarium, Maximum and Laudanum. Their druid was called Hokus Pokus. As the story progresses and Obelix is absent from the action, the strip was renamed Little Fred, the Ancient Brit with Bags of Grit. The story concluded in the issue dated 4 April 1964.

=== Ranger magazine ===
Ranger was a British magazine for boys published in 1965 and 1966. It included a version of Asterix and the Big Fight with the action transferred to Britain. Beginning in issue one, the strip was called Britons Never, Never, Never Shall Be Slaves! with Asterix renamed Beric the Bold and Obelix being called Son of Boadicea. They are referred to as the henchmen of Chief Caradoc and Son of Boadicea has a dog named Fido. Their druid is called Doric. The story concluded in issue 40 at which point Ranger was merged with Look and Learn magazine. The first combined issue, number 232, saw the beginning of a version of Asterix and Cleopatra called In the Days of Good Queen Cleo.

=== William Morrow ===
In 1970, William Morrow published English translations (by Bell and Hockridge) in hardback of three Asterix albums for the American market. These were Asterix the Gaul, Asterix and Cleopatra and Asterix the Legionary. Sales were modest so it was discontinued after the third.

=== National Geographic ===
In their May 1977 issue, the National Geographic featured an article titled "The Celts: Europe's Founders". The article featured a section called Vive Les Celts devoted to Asterix with a comic strip exclusively drawn for the magazine. The inclusion of the article was an attempt by Asterix's creator to make the character well known in the United States. The strip, which was the first to ever appear in the publication, was later reprinted in Asterix and the Class Act.

=== American newspaper syndication ===
From November 1977 until early 1979, five albums and the beginning of a sixth were serialized in syndicated form in a number of North American newspapers. Since these were printed as part of the standard daily comics, and were broken into separately licensed but concurrent daily and Sunday strips, the art needed considerable reworking. This required editing a lot of the dialog. In addition, a number of names, jokes, and pieces of art were further changed to be more politically correct or idiomatic for the newspapers' family-oriented audience. The results were very different from the original translations. Moreover, the selected albums appeared in essentially random order. The experiment came to an end after less than a year and a half.

An introduction to the series ran from Monday, November 14, 1977 to Sunday, November 27, 1977. Papers that started with Cleopatra ran an abridged introduction starting Monday, February 20, 1978.

The stories which appeared were

- "Asterix the Gladiator" from November 28, 1977 to February 26, 1978
- "Asterix and Cleopatra" from February 27 to May 28, 1978
- "Asterix and the Great Crossing" from May 29 to August 27, 1978
- "Asterix and the Big Fight" from August 28 to November 26, 1978
- "Asterix in Spain" from November 27, 1978 to February 25, 1979 (however, most papers had dropped it well before the final date)
- "Asterix in Britain" began February 26, 1979 in a very few papers including the Windsor Star, where it last appeared March 10

Transitions between stories were made from the Thursday or Friday of the final week of a story until the following Monday (including the Sunday color comic), devoting part of each strip to the ending story and part to the upcoming story.

=== American albums ===
Robert Steven Caron translated five volumes into American English for Dargaud's international branch. These are Asterix and the Great Crossing in 1984, Asterix the Legionary and Asterix at the Olympic Games in 1992, and Asterix in Britain and Asterix and Cleopatra in 1995. For copyright purposes, most of the characters names were changed. With Asterix never achieving great popularity in the United States, this series of re-translations was halted after these albums, leading to some confusion among the few American fans of the series (the other volumes through to Asterix in Belgium were issued with the British translation by Dargaud in the same market).

In 2019, The New York Times reported that new Americanized translations of Asterix would be published by Papercutz, starting in May 2020. The new translator is Joe Johnson (Dr. Edward Joseph Johnson), a Professor of French and Spanish at Clayton State University. The Papercutz editions refer to the village druid by his original French name of Panoramix, and various other minor characters have been renamed as well. Papercutz publishes omnibus volumes in chronological order, with each book containing three albums. Papercutz also published the most recent albums, Asterix and the Chieftain's Daughter and Asterix and the Griffin, as solo books.

=== Easy language ===
In 2023 German publisher Egmont Ehapa issued a special edition in Easy Language, on the occasion of the Special Olympics World Games in Berlin. The translation of Bell and Hockridge was transferred into Easy Language by Ursula Semlitsch, for "people who don't understand English very well".
