= Asterix Conquers Rome =

1979 French comic book

Asterix Conquers Rome (Les 12 Travaux d'Asterix)
- Cover of the Dutch translation
- Date: 1979
- Series: Asterix

Creative team
- Writers: Pierre Tchernia; René Goscinny; Albert Uderzo
- Artists: credited to Uderzo, but also his brother Marcel Uderzo, as Marcel drew the 4th task

Original publication
- Date of publication: 1976
- Language: French

Chronology
- Preceded by: Asterix and the Great Crossing
- Followed by: Obelix and Co.

Asterix Conquers Rome (French: Les 12 Travaux d'Asterix, literally "The 12 Tasks of Asterix"), first published in 1976, is the comic book adaptation of the animated Asterix film The Twelve Tasks of Asterix and "unofficially" the twenty-third Asterix volume to be published. The comic follows the movie very closely. It has very rarely been printed and is not widely known even amongst Asterix fans. The English translation has only been printed as part of a one-off comic book annual, the Asterix Annual 1980. It is thus often excluded from "canonical" lists of Asterix volumes with the subsequently published Obelix and Co. typically being listed as the "official" twenty-third volume. An unauthorized English language digital edition in CBR format, titled The Twelve Tasks of Asterix, is also known to exist.

== Plot summary ==
After a Roman centurion is continually defeated by the Village of Indomitable Gauls, he concludes that they must be gods. Julius Caesar sets twelve tasks that only gods could perform, similar to the twelve tasks of Hercules, to prove that the Gauls are mere mortals. If the Gauls succeed, he will admit defeat and let the Gauls become the rulers of Rome, but if they fail, they will become his slaves. The challenge is accepted and Asterix and Obelix are chosen to represent the village, eventually succeeding in all tasks. In the end, Caesar admits the Gauls' superiority. He is shown living in retirement married to Cleopatra, although it is explained that the ending is what it is because it's just a cartoon film, so "anything goes".

== Publication history ==
The volume is only 28 pages long compared to the typical 48. The artwork, although credited to "Uderzo" in some printings, resembles that of the film and is thought to have been the work of Albert Uderzo's brother Marcel who had previously done reconstructive illustration on Asterix the Gaul. The French language edition was published in Belgium, not France, as a marketing freebie connected to a gas station company. An English translation based on the dialogue of the English version of the film was included in the Asterix Annual 1980 published by Whitman in 1979. It has also been translated into Danish, Dutch, German, Italian, Spanish, Norwegian and Serbo-Croatian.

The Danish version was serialised in vol 301 and 302 of the comic book Seriemagasinet in 1983; it is in black and white. The Dutch version was a free booklet included in an issue of the magazine Eppo.

The German version was published as a serial in the magazine Comixene in issues 24–29. The German and the Serbo-Croatian versions were published in black and white. The Italian version has been printed both in a single book and serial format. The Norwegian version was serialized in vol 1 and 2 of the comic book Fantomet (The Phantom) in 1985; it has been published in colour.

=== Asterix Annual 1980 ===
Asterix Annual 1980
- Series: Asterix

Creative team
- Writers: Pierre Tchernia René Goscinny & Albert Uderzo (for Asterix Conquers Rome); Anthea Bell & Derek Hockridge (for rest of the book)
- Artists: Credited to Uderzo, but his brother Marcel Uderzo drew the 4th task

Original publication
- Date of publication: Should have been 1976 (only for Asterix Conquers Rome); but is 1979 (for rest of the book)

Asterix Annual 1980 is a special Asterix book. It contains a few games, abridged versions of a few Asterix comics and Asterix Conquers Rome.

The Annual was published by World and Whitman, and released at a comic book convention in London in 1980.

=== Translations ===
- Danish: Asterix erobrer Rom
- Dutch: Asterix verovert Rome
- Finnish: Asterix valloittaa Rooman
- German: 12 Prüfungen für Asterix
- Italian: Le dodici fatiche di Asterix
- Norwegian: De tolv prøvene
- Serbo-Croatian: 12 podviga
- Spanish: Las doce pruebas de Asterix (Asterix conquista Roma)
- Icelandic: Ástríkur og þrautirnar tólf
- Russian: Двенадцать подвигов Астерикса

== See also ==
- List of Asterix volumes
