= Astérix et Cléopâtre =

Astérix et Cléopâtre may refer to:

- Asterix and Cleopatra, a 1963 French comic book starring Asterix
- Asterix and Cleopatra (film), a 1968 animated film based on that comic
