= Marcel Uderzo =

French comic book artist (1933–2021)

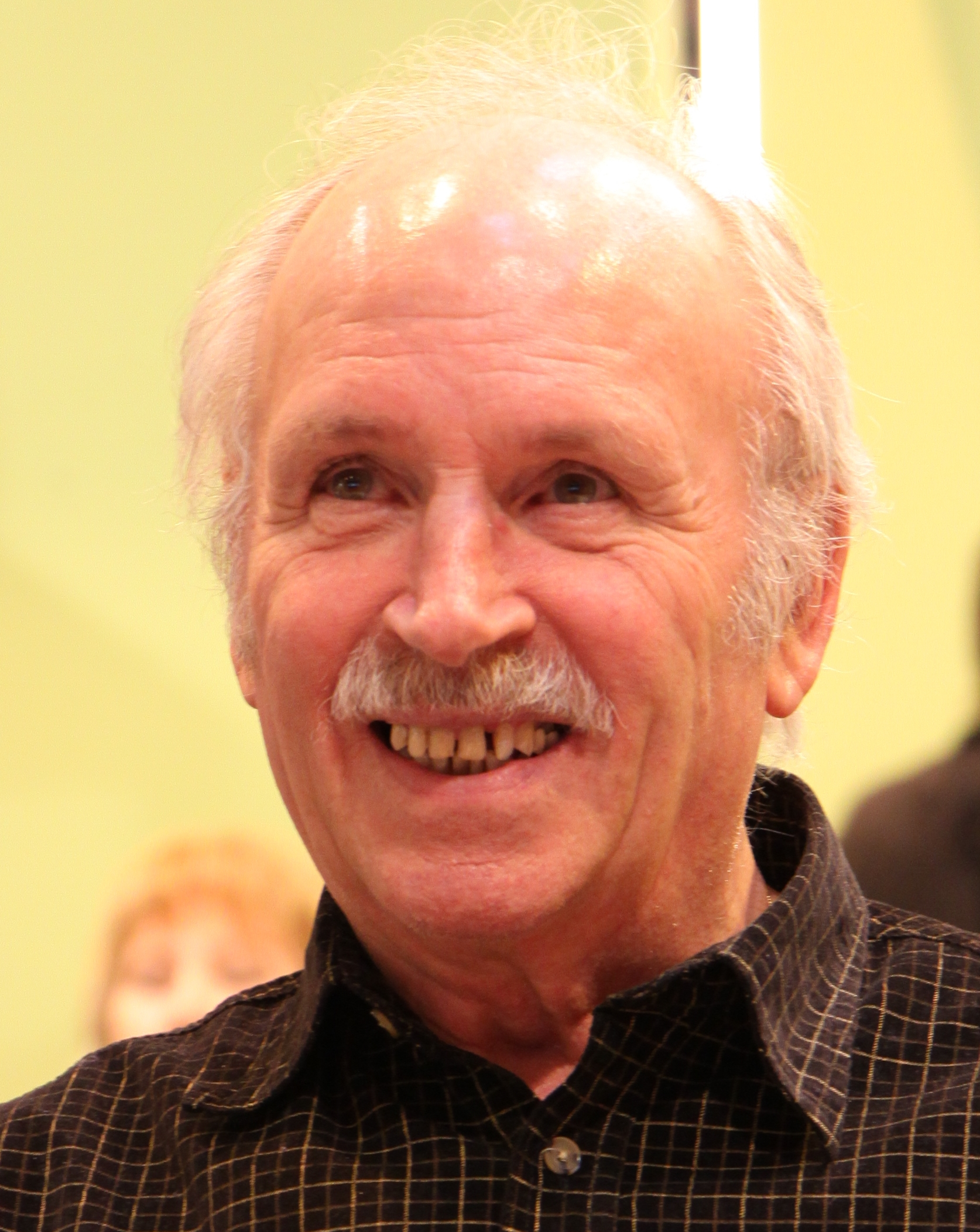
- Uderzo in 2010
- Born: 20 December 1933; Clichy-sous-Bois, France
- Died: 24 January 2021 (aged 87); Évreux, France
- Occupation: Comic book artist
- Relatives: Albert Uderzo (brother)

Marcel Uderzo (20 December 1933 – 24 January 2021) was a French comic book artist. He was the younger brother of fellow comic book artist Albert Uderzo.

== Biography ==
Uderzo was born in Clichy-sous-Bois on 20 December 1933, to a family of Italian immigrants. In 1938, his family moved to the 11th arrondissement of Paris in an area of artisans. When he left school, Uderzo's father taught him the luthier trade. In 1964, his relationship with his father deteriorated and he took up comics.

From 1964 to 1965, Uderzo taught himself how to create comics. He continued to make guitars in his father's workshop while learning to draw and make ink boards for Tanguy et Laverdure. He continued his apprenticeship making ink boards for Asterix. In a 2014 interview, he stated that his resemblance to the character Cacofonix was "striking".

In 1966, Uderzo was hired part-time by Dargaud to create visual products for Asterix. He was then employed full-time by his brother in Neuilly-sur-Seine to work on Tanguy et Laverdure until 1968, when the series was being drawn by Jijé. He then took over inking and coloring for Asterix until the end of his collaboration with his brother in February 1972. After a short break, he resumed work at Dargaud in September 1974 and devoted himself to Asterix. His final volume was Asterix in Belgium. The volume included a parody of a painting by Pieter Bruegel the Elder, which he produced in one day. In 1979, Albert did not invite him to join his new publishing company, Éditions Albert René. As a result, Marcel completely severed ties with his brother, and the two would remain at odds.

In January 1980, Uderzo began working on a personal project, titled Les Mémoires de Mathias. His career of independent activity lasted 33 years and mainly consisted of one-shots, of which he produced about 40. His primary professional partner was Moloch. He spent his retirement in Upper Normandy with Monique-Hélène Ott, his illustrator on 20 volumes.

Marcel Uderzo died in the Hospital of Évreux on 24 January 2021, at the age of 87, of COVID-19 during the COVID-19 pandemic in France.

== Publications ==
=== Series ===
- Mémoires de Mathias (1981–1985)
- Brigade mondaine (1982–1983)
- La Mort rouge (1987)

=== One-shots ===
- À l'est du Yangzi (1976)
- L'ABC de l'épargne (1982)
- Les Grandes Batailles de l'Histoire en bandes dessinées (1984–1985)
- L'Affut (1987)
- Opération Esculape (1988)
- Le Stratagème (1988)
- Roland Garros (1993)
- Charenton (1994)
- Ascq 39-40 (1994)
- Vingt mille lieues sous les mers (1995)
- L'Île mystérieuse (1995)
- De la Terre à la Lune (1995)
- Passion Pétanque (1996)
- Premiers galops (1996)
- Info Sexo (1996)
- Le PSG (1996)
- Les Excès du sénateur Angorus (1998)
- Éducation civique et morale (1999)
- Les Secrets de Youri Djorkaeff (1999)
- Les Tops guns du ski français (2000)
- Champions! Judo (2000)
- La tour raconte (2005)
- Biggles raconte… Les frères Wright (2005)
- Charles 1er (2006)
- Le Dernier des Mohicans (2007)
- Blériot (2008)
- L'Histoire de l'aéronautique : Des origines à Blériot (2009)
- L'Histoire de l'aéronautique : 1909, l'année de tous les défis ! (2010)
- Les Grandes Affaires criminelles et mystérieuses : L'Affaire Spaggiari, le casse du siècle (2012)
- Commando Kieffer : 6 juin 1944 (2012)
- Les Pin-up de Marcel Uderzo (2013)
- Roland Garros (2015)
- Les Frères Wright (2015)
- Mathias (2015)
- Charles Lindbergh (2015)

=== Collective albums ===
- La Robe sans couture (1993)
- La Cour des grands (1993)
- Saga des terres du Nord (1994)
- Le Père de Lucky Luke (1999)
- Histoires et légendes normandes. Les oies du château de Pirou (2009)
- Moi Svein, compagnon d'Hasting (2009)
- Histoires et légendes normandes. La marée des âmes (2010)
- Le Capitaine Ferdinand Ferber (2010)
- Histoires et légendes normandes (2011)
- Patrouilles aériennes acrobatiques (2011)
- La 2 CV, Reine de l'automobile (2011)
- Patrouilles aériennes acrobatiques (2012)
- Hubert Latham, la course à l'exploit (2013)
- Pégoud (2013)
- Patrouille de France, L'Épopée - 30 pieds pour un Fouga (2013)
- Le Noratlas, Patrouille aériennes acrobatiques - Vol. 3 (2014)
- La Coccinelle et le Combi (2014)
- Histoires de pompiers (2014)
- La Traction avant, l'universelle (2015)
- La DS, la majestueuse (2015)
- La 4L, la populaire (2015)
- Histoires et Légendes Normandes : La côte du Parvis (2016)
- La 204, La Lionne du bitume – La 304 (2016)
- Les Légendes du Mont Saint Michel (2017)
- Zorro (2017)
- Le Guide de Paris en BD (2017)
- La Mini, L’histoire d’une légende (2018)
- Zorro (2018)
- Maupassant « Aux champs » (2018)
- La Vespa – « La Guêpe » (2018)
- Les 100 Ans de Citroën - « 100 ans d'Histoire pour Citroën 1919-2019 » (2019)
- Maupassant « Farce Normande » (2019)
- Nono et Moumoune (2019)
- La Fiat 500 – « La Citadine » (2019)

=== Books illustrated ===
- Je découvre le cheval et le poney (2004)
- William et la Sorcière de Londres (2004)
- William et la forêt de Brocéliande (2004)
- William et Ramsès II (2005)
- William et le carrosse hanté (2006)
- Naufrage (2009)
- Les Will-Tordines (2009)
