= Astérix chez les Bretons =

Astérix chez les Bretons may refer to:

- Asterix in Britain, a 1965-1966 French comic book starring Asterix
- Asterix in Britain (film), a 1986 animated film based on that comic
