= Asterix and the Black Gold =

Comic book volume

Asterix and the Black Gold (L'Odyssée d'Astérix)
- Date: 1982
- Series: Asterix

Creative team
- Writers: Albert Uderzo
- Artists: Albert Uderzo

Original publication
- Date of publication: 1981
- Language: French

Chronology
- Preceded by: Asterix and the Great Divide
- Followed by: Asterix and Son

Asterix and the Black Gold (French: L'Odyssée d'Astérix literally "Asterix's Odyssey") is the twenty-sixth volume of Asterix comic book series, originally published in 1981. It is the second book to be both written and drawn by Albert Uderzo.

The book describes Asterix's and Obelix's voyage to the Middle East. It is mainly inspired by James Bond films and biblical tales.

== Plot summary ==
The book begins with Asterix and Obelix hunting wild boar until one boar leads them to a Roman patrol, which the Gauls vanquish while the boars escape. In Rome, Julius Caesar orders M. Devius Surreptitious, the head of M.I.VI, to send an agent to infiltrate the Gauls. This agent is a Gaulish-Roman druid known as Dubbelosix, who travels in a folding chariot full of secret devices. Dubbelosix and Surreptitius communicate via a carrier fly, who develops a crush for Dubbelosix. In the Gaulish village, Getafix is upset because he has run out of rock oil (petrol), which he requires to make the magic potion enabling the Gaulish resistance to Rome.

The following day, Getafix is cheered by the arrival of Ekonomikrisis, the Phoenician merchant but suffers a stroke upon hearing that he forgot to bring rock oil. When Chief Vitalstatistix tells Asterix and Obelix to fetch another druid to treat him, they discover Dubbelosix, who successfully revives Getafix with an alcoholic tonic. Asterix determines to go with Obelix and Dogmatix to obtain rock oil from Mesopotamia (now Iraq); Dubbelosix insists on coming, and they set off on Ekonomikrisis' ship. Along the way, they defeat pirates and Roman warships, while Dubbelosix secretly corresponds with the Romans, to arrange a blockade. The Phoenician ship finally lands at Judea, where Asterix, Obelix, Dogmatix, and Dubbelosix disembark for Jerusalem, where some sympathetic traders help the Gauls to enter secretly, in spite of an attempt by Dubbelosix to alert the city guards. Leaving him behind, Asterix and Obelix make contact with Ekonomikrisis' supplier, Samson Alius, who directs them to Babylon as the Romans have destroyed rock oil supplies in Jerusalem.

In the Syrian Desert, Asterix, Obelix, and Dogmatix find themselves caught up in ongoing wars between the Sumerians, Akkadians, Hittites, Assyrians, and Medes, much to Asterix's frustration. In the ensuing arrow battles, their waterskin is pierced, but they find a source of rock oil in the ground and carry some back to Jerusalem in the repaired waterskin. There, the two Gauls capture Caesar's personal ship, as well as Surreptitious and Dubbelosix. Near the coast of Gaul, Dubbelosix seizes the waterskin of rock oil and, as he tries to force it open, Obelix leaps upon him, spilling the oil into the sea. Asterix has lost all hope, but when they come back to the village, they find the Gauls fighting Romans as merrily as ever, and learn Getafix has replaced the rock oil in his potion with beetroot juice. Out of dismay, Asterix has a stroke, but after being cured with the new potion, convinces Getafix to perform experiments before testing him. Thereafter, the Gauls send Dubbelosix and Surreptitius to Caesar in a gift-wrapped box. Caesar sends them to the Circus Maximus as punishment for failure, where they are covered in honey and chased by bees, with the lovesick carrier fly following behind.

== Commentary ==
- In the omnibus edition version of Black Gold there is a dedication on the back of the title page that reads “à René” (to René), referring to Goscinny, who died on 5 November 1977, four years before Black Gold was published in French, presumably written by Uderzo.
- An audiobook of Asterix and the Black Gold adapted by Anthea Bell and Derek Hockridge and narrated by William Rushton was released on Hodder and Stoughton's Hodder Children's Audio.
- The character Dubbelosix is an obvious homage to Sean Connery, star of the early James Bond movies. Uderzo modelled him on the appearance of Connery at the time the book was being drawn. Dubbelosix uses many "ancient times" versions of the popular gadgets of the Bond movies. His name is a pun on "006" (i.e. "007") — the "six" being required for the "-ix" suffix of all male Gaulish names in Asterix, and also reflecting the number of times Sean Connery portrayed the role of James Bond on screen, which at the time was six.
- When attempting to cure Getafix, Dubbelosix administers "a grain spirit called Caledonian", which is explained as "Ancient Scotch". This is a pun referring to the drink and the people — all the more so since Connery is Scottish himself.
- The secret service run by Surreptitius is referred to as M.I.VI. "VI" is 6 in Roman numerals, and MI6 is the name of the British espionage service.
- Surreptitius is a caricature of actor Bernard Blier and bears some resemblance to James Bond's early bosses M (played in the films by Bernard Lee and Robert Brown)
- The scene where the papyrus bearing instructions self-destructs after being read is a reference to Mission: Impossible where messages destroyed themselves after being received.
- Saul ben Ephishul ("So Beneficial" or perhaps "It's all beneficial", Saül Péhyé, a play on ça eût payé and therefore on a sketch by Fernand Reynaud in the original French), the Jew who escorts Asterix and Obelix from Jerusalem to the Dead Sea, is based on Asterix creator and writer René Goscinny (also of Jewish stock), who had died four years earlier.
- Asterix's and Obelix's visit to Jerusalem is full of references to the Bible. For example, Economikrisis mentions on page 29 that they have arrived in "the promised land". Asterix and Obelix spend the night in a stable in Bethlehem, and Saul ben Ephishul mentions the story of David and Goliath.
- The Roman procurator "Pontius Pirate" (a reference to Pontius Pilate) is constantly washing his hands and resembles French actor Jean Gabin, who played Pontius Pilate in the 1935 French film Golgotha.
- In the desert, Asterix and Obelix run into several warrior groups from historical Mesopotamian cultures — Sumerians, Assyrians, Hittites, Medes etc. — who each greet them with a hail of arrows because they mistake them for their enemies. Incidentally, the cultures conquered each other in the reverse order to which they appear in the comic; i.e. the Medes conquered the Assyrians, the Akkadians conquered the Sumerians etc. Their presence is, however, anachronistic, as these cultures no longer existed in Roman times. The entire sequence is a reference to the later 20th century conflicts in the Middle East.
- The Herodian Kingdom of Israel is anachronistically referred as Palestine — this name came into use only in the 2nd century CE, whereas Asterix is set c. 50 BCE.
- Near the end of the book when the rock oil is spilled into the sea, a seabird angrily shouts: "Oh no, don't tell me you are starting already!". This is a reference to oil spills, most notably the Amoco Cadiz which sank in 1978 in front of the coast of Brittany, where the home village of Asterix is located, according to the series.
- The scene of Jerusalem is taken one on one from the Holyland hotel 2nd temple model as can be seen here in its original location (in a 3d view). This model has been moved to the Israel Museum in Jerusalem.
- The Jews are all depicted as Yemenite Jews, with dark skin and black eyes and beards, a tribute to Marc Chagall the famous painter whose painting of King David hangs at the Knesset (Israeli Parliament).
- Uderzo includes several small references to Jewish traditions.
- The Gauls leave Jerusalem through the Lions' Gate, which, while drawn very accurately, was in fact built more than 1,200 years after the timeline of the Asterix comic. The lions (e.g. cheetahs) carved in the stones are the imperial Symbol of Baibars, and the gate with the 'lions', incorporated into Sultan Suleiman's outer wall, still stands today.
- Several characters in the story comment on the uselessness and nastiness of rock oil, wondering why anybody would want it; this starkly contrasts the dependence on petroleum which marks our own time.
- In the Norwegian translation, the new magic potion ingredient that replaced rock oil is not identified.

== In other languages ==
- Catalan: L'odissea d'Astèrix
- Croatian: Rimski druid (Roman druid)
- Czech: Asterixova odysea
- Dutch: De odyssee van Asterix
- Finnish: Asterixin harharetket
- German: Die Odysee
- Greek: Η οδύσσεια του Αστερίξ
- Hebrew: אסטריקס וירושלים של זהב שחור
- Indonesian: Perjalanan ke Mesopotamia (Journey to Mesopotamia)
- Italian: L'Odissea di Asterix
- Latin: Odyssea Asterigis
- Norwegian: Asterix' Odysse
- Portuguese: A odisseia de Astérix
- Polish: Odyseja Asteriksa
- Serbian: Asteriksova Odiseja
- Spanish: La odisea de Astérix
- Turkish: Asteriks ve Kara Altın
- Swedish: Asterix på irrvägar
