= Hockridge =

Hockridge is a surname. Notable people with the surname include:

- Derek Hockridge (1934–2013), British writer and translator
- Edmund Hockridge (1919–2009), Canadian baritone and actor
