= Asterix Conquers America =

1994 animated film by Gerhard Hahn

- Theatrical release poster
- Directed by: Gerhard Hahn
- Screenplay by: Thomas Platt; Rhett Rooster
- Story by: Albert Uderzo; Pierre Tchernia
- Based on: Asterix and the Great Crossing by René Goscinny; Albert Uderzo
- Produced by: Gerhard Hahn; Jürgen Wohlrabe
- Starring: Craig Charles; Howard Lew Lewis; Geoffrey Bayldon; Henry McGee; Christopher Biggins
- Narrated by: John Rye
- Music by: Harold Faltermeyer
- Production company: Extrafilm Produktion GmbH
- Distributed by: Jugendfilm
- Release date: 29 September 1994
- Running time: 85 minutes
- Country: Germany
- Language: English
- Budget: DEM 19.000.000
- Box office: $768,488 (United States)

Asterix Conquers America (French: Astérix et les Indiens; German: Asterix in Amerika) is a 1994 English-language German animated film, directed by Gerhard Hahn, and co-produced by Hahn and Jürgen Wohlrabe. The film is a loose adaptation of the Asterix graphic novel, Asterix and the Great Crossing and the only film adaptation to be produced outside France. It is also the first Asterix movie to be made in English. The plot focuses on Asterix and Obelix seeking to rescue Getafix, who is transported to North America by the Romans, before their village runs out of magic potion to defend themselves. The film was distributed in Germany by Jugendfilm, with 20th Century Fox handling distribution in several European territories, including France and the United Kingdom.

== Plot ==
After the rebel village of Gauls defeat another Roman army, a humiliated Julius Caesar angrily devises a plan to cut them off from the magic potion that gives them super-human strength. Caesar's instructs his most loyal patrician, Lucullus, to kidnap the druid Getafix and send him off the edge of the world. A freak accident during a fight amongst the Gaulish villagers spills a cauldron of potion. Getafix takes Dogmatix to locate ingredients to make more. Lucullus, pretending to be a druid, captures them. Asterix and Obelix spot the pair being taken on a Roman galley and pursue them.

They track the galley and are reunited with Dogmatix who was thrown overboard. On arrival at the east coast of North America, which they mistake for the world's edge, the Romans catapult Getafix ashore. Lucullus is delighted when Asterix, Obelix and Dogmatix crash on the shore and returns home to inform Caesar of the good news. Asterix and Obelix begin exploring North America. Asterix is captured by a tribe of Native Americans and tied to a pole beside Getafix, who reveals the Romans had catapulted him onto the hut of the tribe's medicine man.

Obelix rescues Minihooha, the daughter of the tribe's chief, from a bison stampede and impresses the chief with his strength. Asterix and Getafix are freed and the Gauls join the tribe's evening customs. Getafix humiliates the medicine man with his magic, and gives Minihooha magic potion to punish him for dousing her during a cheap trick. The medicine man visits the Gauls' tent offering peace and knocks them out with hallucinogens in a pipe, kidnapping Getafix. Obelix awakes in a drug-induced amnesia, leaving Asterix to rescue Getafix on his own.

After Minihooha cures Obelix, the Gauls say farewell and return home to find the Romans overwhelmed the village after they ran out of magic potion. Finding all but Cacofonix captured, Getafix brews the magic potion. Asterix and Obelix sneak into a Roman camp disguised as Roman soldiers, supply their fellow Gauls with the potion, and proceed to trash the camp. Lucullus is eaten by Caesar's pet panther, while Caesar himself discreetly escapes and returns home. As the villagers hold a celebratory feast, the group listen to Obelix describe his latest adventure before teaching them the song he learned from the Native American tribe.

== Cast ==
Character	Original	French Dub
Narrator	John Rye	Pierre Tchernia
Asterix	Craig Charles	Roger Carel
Obelix	Howard Lew Lewis	Pierre Tornade
Getafix	Geoffrey Bayldon	Henri Labussière
Julius Caesar	Henry McGee	Robert Party
Lucullus	Christopher Biggins	Jean-Luc Galmiche
Medicine Man	Rupert Degas (uncredited)	Rupert Degas (uncredited)
Cacofonix	Brian Greene (uncredited)	Michel Tugot-Doris
Unhygienix	Jonathan Kydd (uncredited)	Jean Dautremay
Centurion Voluptuous Arteriosclerosus	Jonathan Kydd (uncredited)	Yves Pignot
Vitalstatistix	Jim Carter (uncredited)	François Chaix
Stupidus	Jim Carter (uncredited)	Olivier Jankovic
Panacea	Vanessa Feltz (uncredited)	Nathalie Spitzer
Impedimenta	Julie Gibbs (uncredited)	Claude Chantal
Captain Redbeard	Jim Carter (uncredited)	Joël Zaffarano
Indian Chief	Rupert Degas (uncredited) Geoffrey Bayldon (one issue, uncredited)	Sylvain Lemarié
Pirates	Rupert Degas (uncredited) Jim Carter (one issue, uncredited)	Thierry Buisson Philippe Sollier (one issue)
Pirates	Jim Carter (uncredited)	Philippe Sollier
Pirates	Jim Carter (uncredited)	Christian Pélissier (uncredited)
Pirates	Rupert Degas (uncredited)	Thierry Buisson
Senators	Jim Carter (uncredited)	Philippe Valmont
Senators	Rupert Degas (uncredited)	Michel Prud'homme
Senators	Jim Carter (uncredited)	François Jaubert
Galley Slaves	Rupert Degas (uncredited)	Unknown
Galley Slaves	Jim Carter (uncredited)	Michel Prud'homme
Etishu	Jennifer Blanc-Biehn (uncredited)	Jennifer Blanc-Biehn (uncredited)
Pirate Lookout	Jim Carter (uncredited)	Unknown
Fulliautomatix	Jim Carter (uncredited)	Joël Zaffarano
Corpulentus	Jim Carter (uncredited)	Sylvain Lemarié
Geriatrix	Rupert Degas (uncredited)	Unknown
Homeless Roman Man	Jim Carter (uncredited)	Unknown
Romans in Rome	Jim Carter (uncredited)	Unknown
Romans in Rome	Rupert Degas (uncredited)	Unknown
Parrot	Jonathan Kydd (uncredited)	Unknown
Impedimenta's Nephew	Julia Brahms (uncredited)	Unknown
Roman Lady in Rome	Olivia d'Abo (uncredited)	Unknown
Indian Child	Olivia d'Abo (uncredited)	Unknown
Dogmatix	Unknown	Unknown

=== Uncredited ===
- Original: Rupert Degas (Legionnaires, Indians, Gauls), Jim Carter (Legionnaires, Indians, Gauls), Olivia d'Abo (Gauls)

== See also ==
- List of Asterix films
