= Éditions Albert René =

French publishing house

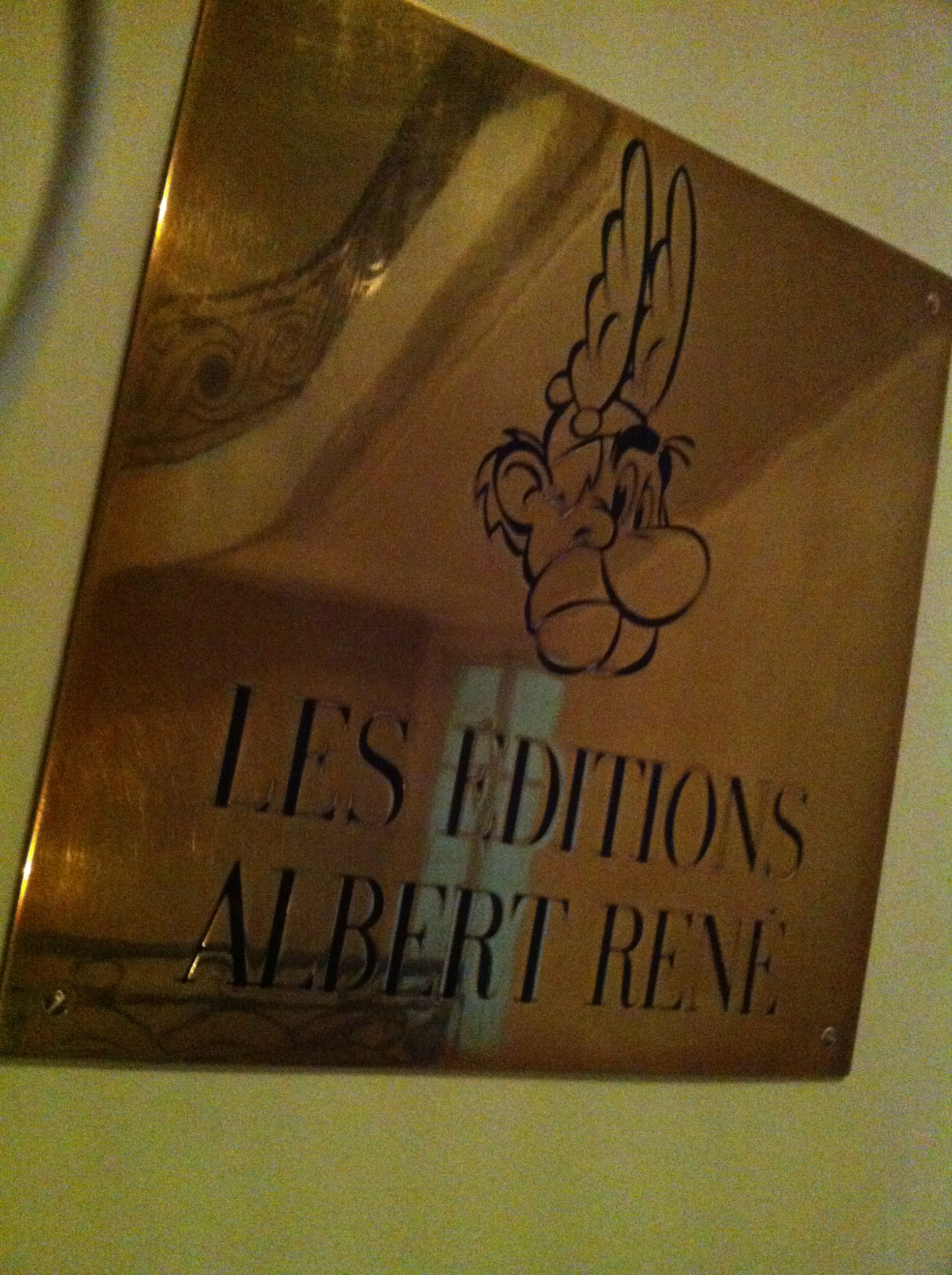
- Parent company: Hachette Livre
- Founded: 1979
- Founder: Albert Uderzo
- Country of origin: France
- Headquarters location: Paris
- Publication types: Books
- Fiction genres: Comics
- Owner(s): Lagardère Publishing
- Official website: www.asterix.com

Éditions Albert René is a French publishing house created in 1979 by cartoonist Albert Uderzo, two years after the death of his collaborating scriptwriter René Goscinny. The company Lagardère Publishing (via Hachette Livre) has owned 100% of the publishing house since 2011. Éditions Albert René controls the publication of the Astérix series (from the album Asterix and the Great Divide, 25th album in the series), Jehan Pistolet, Oumpah-Pah and the other joint works of Uderzo and Goscinny.
