= Asterix and the Big Fight =

Comic book album by René Goscinny

Asterix and the Big Fight (Le Combat des Chefs)
- Cover of the English edition
- Date: 1966
- Main characters: Asterix and Obelix
- Series: Asterix

Creative team
- Writers: René Goscinny
- Artists: Albert Uderzo

Original publication
- Published in: Pilote magazine
- Issues: 261–302
- Date of publication: 1964
- Language: French

Translation
- Translator: Anthea Bell and Derek Hockridge

Chronology
- Preceded by: Asterix and Cleopatra
- Followed by: Asterix in Britain

Asterix and the Big Fight (also known as "The Battle of the Chieftains" - translated from French: Le Combat des Chefs) is a French comic book story, written by René Goscinny and illustrated by Albert Uderzo. It is the seventh story in the Asterix comic book series, and was originally published by Dargaud as a serial for Pilote magazine in 1964, before later being released as a comic album in 1966.

The story focuses on Asterix and Obelix attempting to get their village's druid cured of several conditions following an accident, all while their chief, Vitalstatistix, prepares to do battle with a rival chief allied to the Romans.

Asterix and the Big Fight received positive reviews following its publication. An animated miniseries adaptation of the story premiered on Netflix on April 30, 2025.

== Plot summary ==
At the fortified garrison of Totorum in Armorica, Centurion Nebulus Nimbus, the camp's commander, expresses his frustration at being humiliated by the village of Gauls who continually resist Roman rule. His advisor, Felonius Caucus, suggests a solution to the situation by invoking an ancient Gaulish custom known as "The Big Fight" - single combat between two Gaulish chiefs, in which the loser forfeits their entire tribe to the winner. The pair travel to Linoleum to request the aid of its chief, Cassius Ceramix, who is loyal to Rome after his tribe were conquered and became Gallo-Romans. Ceramix balks at the idea, arguing that Vitalstatistix, chief of the rebels, would win with the potion of superhuman strength that his tribe uses against the Romans.

Caucus decides to ease Ceramix's concern by suggesting the Romans get rid of the village's druid, Getafix. However, Asterix and Obelix come across the effort to kidnap him, and quickly move to prevent this, but in scattering the soldiers, Obelix accidentally strikes Getafix with a menhir, causing him to suffer amnesia and insanity. After Ceramix is made to issue his challenge against Vitalstatistix, Nimbus sends a spy into the village to investigate Getafix's situation, and is delighted to learn he cannot make the magic potion in his condition. After several attempts to cure him, Vitalstatistix suggests to Asterix about securing the aid of the druid Psychoanalytix, who specializes in mental disorders. Brought back to the village, Psychoanalytix examines Getafix, but when he asks how his condition came to be, Obelix foolishly demonstrates on him with a menhir, causing him to suffer the same afflictions.

Unable to contend with the problem, as the two druids make crazy potions together, Asterix decides to prepare Vitalstatistix for the upcoming fight. At the same time, Nimbus oversees Ceramix's training but becomes concerned he and Linoleum will rebel against the Romans if he wins, leading Caucus to suggest they should send him to Rome in chains after his victory. As the fight is about to begin, Getafix accidentally makes a potion which cures him. When Asterix is sent into the village by Vitalstatistix to find Obelix, he is relieved to find him cured, though panics when Obelix strikes him with a menhir, thinking it would cure him despite not noticing his recovery. After Getafix is found to have been unharmed by Obelix's actions, he soon brews up the magic potion for the village, suspecting a double-cross by the Romans upon hearing about the fight with Ceramix.

As the potion is distributed amongst his fellow villagers, Asterix gives Vitalstatistix the good news, who defeats Ceramix with a single blow after running him ragged by evading his attacks. The Romans soon attack the Gauls rather than accept Ceramix's loss, only to be defeated with ease, forcing Nimbus and Caucus into a humiliating retreat. After the fight, Ceramix is found to have been accidentally struck by a menhir thrown by Obelix, and now has amnesia that causes him to become gentle and courteous. Vitalstatistix declines his right to take over Ceramix's tribe, and sends him home in honour, with Linoleum returning to its Gaulish ways. Psychoanalytix, having recovered most of his sanity, also returns to his business and continues to be a success even though he still has mild mental disorders that cause side effects to his treatments. The village holds a banquet to celebrate Vitalstatistix's victory and Getafix's recovery.

== Characters ==
- Asterix – Gaulish warrior, and the main protagonist of the story.
- Obelix – Gaulish menhir delivery man and warrior, and a close friend of Asterix.
- Dogmatix – Obelix's pet dog, who is loyal to him and Asterix.
- Getafix – Gaulish druid of the village, responsible for the superhuman magic potion they use.
- Vitalstatistix – Chief of the Gaulish village.
- Nebulus Nimbus – Commander of the camp of Totorum.
- Felonius Caucus – Nimbus' shrewd and cunning advisor.
- Cassius Ceramix – Chief of the town of Linoleum. The name is a parody of Cassius Clay, the former name for boxer Muhammad Ali. In the French original, the character is known as Aplusbégalix, a play on the common maths equation "A plus B equals X".
- Psychoanalytix – Druid who specialises in treating mental disorders.
- Infirmofpurpus - Roman legionary sent to spy on the village.

Impedimenta made her first appearance in this story, though only in a brief scene; she was not named until a later story. The comic also features a cameo of the Marsupilami, a noted Belgian comics character.

== Cultural references ==
- In issue #260 of Pilote, Goscinny and Uderzo spoofed a small strip involving Vitalstatistix hosting a press conference announcing the story of Asterix and the Big Fight in upcoming issues. The entire conference parodied one held by French President Charles de Gaulle.
- The scenes of Vitalstatistix's fight with Ceramix features the character parodying both Muhammad Ali's boxing style, 'rope-a-dope', and his victory celebration, known as the Ali shuffle.
- A patient visiting Psychoanalytix parodies the posture and pose of Napoleon Bonaparte.
- The story features a line spoken by a Gallo-Roman stating Ceramix is "inspecting Professor Berlix's school for modern languages". The name Professor Berlix is a parody of the real-life linguist Maximilian Berlitz.
- In a scene featuring the Gauls setting up an amusement park, one panel from this features a roller coaster, in which the French original had the ride called "Slavic Mountain" – a parody of the French words – French: montagnes ("mountain") and French: russes ("Russian") – which combined are the French translation of "roller coaster". In the immediate panel afterwards, a stall is set up called "W. H. Smix", which is a parody of the retail chain W. H. Smith.

== Adaptations ==
In 1967, following the production of the first Asterix animated film, Asterix the Gaul, publisher Dargaud commissioned two more films to Belgian studio Belvision, one adapting Asterix and the Golden Sickle and the other Asterix and the Big Fight. However, René Goscinny and Albert Uderzo, who had not been consulted for the first film and were unimpressed with the result, rejected those projects, whose production was halted.

In 1989, part of the story was adapted in the animated feature film Asterix and the Big Fight (known in French as Astérix et le Coup du Menhir). However, that film only used some plot elements from the book, primarily Getafix's insanity, and was for the most part an adaptation of another volume, Asterix and the Soothsayer.

In 2025, Netflix released a 3D animated miniseries, Asterix and Obelix: The Big Fight. This adaptation, which expanded the book's original story and altered several plot elements, started streaming on April 30, 2025.
