= Dogmatix =

Fictional dog in the Asterix comics

- Dogmatix

Publication information
- Publisher: Dargaud
- First appearance: Asterix and the Banquet (1963)
- Created by: René Goscinny; Albert Uderzo

In-story information
- Species: Dog
- Supporting character of: Obelix
- Notable aliases: Idéfix (French name)

Dogmatix (/dɒɡˈmætɪks/ dog-MAT-iks; French: Idéfix [idefiks]) is a fictional white terrier dog who is a companion to Obelix in the Asterix comics. Dogmatix is a pun on the words dog and dogmatic. In the original French, his name is a pun on the expression idée fixe ('fixed idea'), meaning an obsession.

On January 6, 2021, it was announced that the character would have his own animated television series titled Dogmatix and the Indomitables.

== Character synopsis ==
Dogmatix is the only animal among the main characters of the series. His role is minor and funny in most of the stories, serving mainly as a "bone" of contention between Asterix and Obelix as to whether he should be allowed to accompany them on their adventures. However, he is often seen doing something interesting in the background and occasionally fulfills an important part of the plot. In the words of the authors, Dogmatix is the only known "canine ecologist": he loves trees and howls in distress whenever one is damaged. Despite his small size, he is quite fearless. He has drunk the magic potion on a number of occasions, but his favourite treat is to 'chew a bone'.

A dog similar to Dogmatix appeared in page 28 of Asterix & the Golden Sickle. Dogmatix first appears in Asterix and the Banquet. Sitting outside a butcher's shop in Lutetia, he observes Asterix and Obelix go in. He then follows them all around Gaul, appearing in nearly every panel of the remainder of the story. The two men do not notice him until the very end, when he finally attracts Obelix's attention at the closing banquet and is given a pat on the head and a bone. Goscinny's original script simply specified that a little dog sat next to the butcher's shop: it was Uderzo who came up with the idea of including the dog for the rest of the story.

The dog was meant to be a one-off character (hence his leaving the village in the final picture after Obelix gives him a bone) but he was so effective it was decided to bring him back. Pilote, the magazine that published Asterix, held a contest to find a name for the dog. Hundreds of suggestions were received. The winning name, Idéfix, was submitted by Hervé Ambroise, Dominique and Anne Boucard, and Rémi Dujat. Goscinny and Uderzo found the name Idéfix appropriate because, in Asterix and the Banquet, the dog's "fixed idea", and his reason for following Asterix and Obelix, had been to obtain a bone from them.

In the next adventure, Asterix and Cleopatra, Dogmatix is given his name and plays a more active role. Asterix and Obelix argue about whether or not Dogmatix should accompany them to Egypt, but he proves his worth by following the Gauls into a pyramid in which they were lost and guiding them out safely.

Like many dogs, Dogmatix is protective of his master, especially when he falls for, or is shown affection by, beautiful young women. In Asterix the Legionary he makes clear his loathing for Panacea with whom Obelix had fallen in love. He shows the same attitude to Influenza in Asterix and Caesar's Gift and Melodrama in Asterix and the Great Divide. However, despite his loyalty to his master, Dogmatix has been shown to side with Asterix in arguments on various occasions, such as in Asterix and the Soothsayer and Obelix and Co.

His friendship with Pepe in Asterix in Spain and Asterix in Corsica causes Obelix to become jealous. Likewise, Dogmatix is unimpressed by Obelix's attraction towards Panacea in the earlier stages of Asterix the Legionary and is hostile and growls when his master asks her to look after him while he is away. However, Panacea kisses him straightaway, putting him into a lovestruck daze.

Like the other villagers, he does not like Cacofonix and his only dialogue (in a thought bubble) is in Asterix and the Magic Carpet where he comments on Cacofonix's music skills, when Cacophonix was commenting on Wazizneim.

In Asterix and the Actress, he finds a mate and returns with a litter of puppies.

== Dogmatix books ==
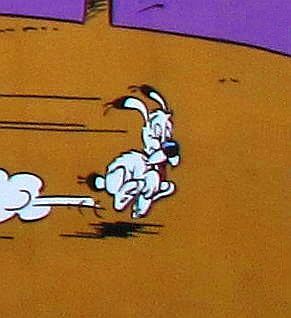
The dog Idéfix (detail of a mural in Brussels, 33 rue de la Buanderie)

Dogmatix's great popularity gave rise to a line of children's books in 1973 featuring his "adventures". These were in the form of text with illustrations and were not consistent with the Asterix stories.

1. Idéfix fait du sport (Dogmatix the Athlete)
2. Idéfix et la petite fille (Dogmatix and the Little Girl)
3. Idéfix au cirque (Dogmatix at the Circus)
4. Une folle poursuite (The Crazy Chase)
5. Idéfix se fait un ami (Dogmatix Makes a Friend)
6. La chasse au sanglier (Dogmatix and the Boar Hunt)
7. L'orage (Dogmatix and the Storm)
8. Un gouter bien merité (The Well-Deserved Tea Party)
9. Idefix et le bébé (Dogmatix and the Baby) - not translated to English
10. Idéfix et le poisson clown (Dogmatix and the Lost Fish)
11. L'anniversaire d'Idéfix (Dogmatix's Birthday) - not translated to English
12. Idéfix à la neige (Dogmatix in the Snow) - not translated to English
13. Idéfix magicien (Dogmatix the Wizard) - not translated to English
14. Idéfix et le perroquet (Dogmatix and the Parrot)
15. Idéfix s'en va-t'en guerre (Dogmatix goes to war) - not translated to English
16. Idéfix et le petit lapin (Dogmatix and the Little Rabbit) - not translated to English

Although they carry the Goscinny/Uderzo byline, these are licensed works aimed at the children's market. They lack the style and sophistication of the main Asterix creative team, and have little or no editing for continuity. Although widely translated (not by the regular English translators of the Asterix comics), these comics did not become very popular and are mostly forgotten. The English editions of these works also contain many glaring mistakes. For example, the chief's wife is referred to as "Bacteria", while her usual name is Impedimenta; Bacteria is the name of Unhygenix’s wife.

In 1983, an attempt was made to revive the series with two new stories. These were translated by Derek Hockridge and Anthea Bell, the regular English language translators of the Asterix albums.

1. Idéfix et le vilain petit aiglon (Dogmatix and the Ugly Little Eagle)
2. Idéfix et la grande fringale (Dogmatix and the Magic Potions)

== Comic albums ==
Idéfix et les Irréductibles (Dogmatix and the Indomitables)

1. Pas de quartier pour le latin ! 2021. (Show no mercy to the Romans !)
2. Les Romains se prennent une gamelle ! 2022 June (The Romans go to the Dogs !)
3. Ça balance pas mal à Lutèce ! 2022 October (Ruffin’ and Rollin’ in Lutetia)
4. Les irréductibles font leur cirque ! 2023 June (The Indomitables ruff things up)
5. Idéfix et le druide 2023 October (Dogmatix and the Druid)
6. La Foret lumiere 2024 (the Forest of Lights)
