= Asterix in Britain =

1965 comic book album

Asterix in Britain (Astérix chez les Bretons)
- Cover of the English edition
- Date: 1966
- Main characters: Asterix and Obelix
- Series: Asterix

Creative team
- Writers: Rene Goscinny
- Artists: Albert Uderzo

Original publication
- Published in: Pilote magazine
- Issues: 307–334
- Date of publication: 1965
- Language: French

Translation
- Translator: Anthea Bell and Derek Hockridge

Chronology
- Preceded by: Asterix and the Big Fight
- Followed by: Asterix and the Normans

Asterix in Britain (also known as "Asterix in the land of the Britons" - translated from French: Astérix chez les Bretons) is a French comic story, written by Rene Goscinny and illustrated by Albert Uderzo. It is the eighth story in the Asterix comic book series, and was originally published by Dargaud as a serial for Pilote magazine in 1965, before being released as a comic album in 1966.

The story focuses on Asterix and Obelix travelling to Roman-occupied Britain to help deliver a barrel of magic potion to a rebel Briton village, only to encounter obstacles that hinder their journey. The story featured several references and parodies surrounding British culture and society.

Asterix in Britain received an audiobook adaptation, as well as two film adaptations: an animated film of the same name in 1986; and a live-action film, Asterix and Obelix: God Save Britannia, in 2012.

== Plot summary ==
Following a successful military campaign, the Romans conquer most of Britain. However, one village (situated in present-day Kent) manages to resist the invaders. Mykingdomforanos, the village's chief, knowing they will need help, assigns his best warrior, Anticlimax, to seek help from his cousin in Gaul, after he mentions how they rely on a potion of superhuman strength to resist the Romans. Travelling by night, he reaches Armorica, where he reunites with his cousin Asterix and explains the situation to him. Druid Getafix, being informed of his request, agrees to supply a barrel of potion, with Asterix and Obelix offering to help transport it to Britain. Before they leave, Asterix notices Getafix in possession of strange herbs he got from the Far East, and takes some with him.

Travelling across the English Channel, the group encounter a Roman galley, which Obelix delights in boarding, having been bored with the Roman's absence around their village. However, a Roman officer overhears them talking about their mission and returns to Britain to give warning to newly appointed governor Encyclopaedicus Britannicus. After Asterix and his friends narrowly avoid being captured by a Roman patrol searching for them, they make for the city of Londinium and hide out at a tavern run by Dipsomaniax. Britannicus, learning they were heading for the city, guesses their likely actions and has all barrels of beer and wine confiscated from every tavern and inn, leading to the magic potion being seized amongst them.

The following day, Asterix, Obelix and Anticlimax head to the governor's palace to get the potion back. Finding the Romans are drunk after being up all night taste-testing the barrels, with one having had the potion by accident, they discover they can't find their barrel amongst those taken from Dipsomaniax's tavern. Although they take these barrels back, Obelix accidentally gets drunk from one of them and distracts the group into fighting a Roman patrol, allowing a thief to steal them. Asterix and Anticlimax attempt to search for the thief with little luck, before finding the Romans had razed Dipsomaniax's tavern to the ground in their absence, arresting him and Obelix, per Britannicus' orders. Learning they were imprisoned in the Tower of Londinium, they attempt to rescue them, though fortunately Obelix, recovering from his hangover, breaks himself and Dipsomaniax from prison, reuniting with Asterix and Anticlimax.

Resuming their search, Asterix, Obelix and Anticlimax eventually track down the thief to a suburb of the city. Learning he sold all the barrels, they find that the barrel of magic potion was eventually sold on to a rugby team, and seize it from them during a rugby match. However, in their escape along the Thames, the Romans ambushes the trio, destroying the barrel and spilling its contents into the river. Although disheartened, Asterix recalls the herbs he took and decides to feign making the potion with them. The resulting brew gives a psychological boost to the rebel Britons, who promptly defeat another Roman assault with ease. Mykingdomforanos, made aware of the truth, asks for more of the herbs after declaring the brew will be their national drink. After bidding farewell to Anticlimax, the Gauls return home. During a banquet held by their village in honor of their latest victory, Asterix inquires about the herbs, to which Getafix reveals them to be called tea.

== Characters ==
- Asterix – Gaulish warrior, and the main protagonist of the story.
- Obelix – Gaulish menhir delivery man and warrior, and a close friend of Asterix.
- Dogmatix – Obelix's pet dog, who is loyal to him and Asterix.
- Getafix – Gaulish druid of the village, responsible for the superhuman magic potion they use.
- Vitalstatistix – Chief of the Gaulish village.
- Anticlimax – A Briton warrior, and cousin of Asterix.
- Mykingdomforanos – Anticlimax's Briton chief. The character's appearance is a caricature parody of British Prime Minister Winston Churchill. In the French original, the character is known as Zebigbos, a parody of the phrase "The big boss".
- Dipsomaniax – A tavern owner in Londinium.
- Encyclopaedicus Britannicus – The newly elected governor of Britain following the Roman's conquest of the island.
- Tullis Stratocumulus – A Roman officer being sent back to Gaul from Britain, and to his camp near Asterix's village.
- The Pirates – A group of pirates led by Captain Redbeard, who often suffer bad luck with the Gauls.

Julius Caesar makes a brief cameo in one panel during the opening background of the story. The Beatles make a cameo appearance in one panel as a group of famous Briton bards.

== Cultural references ==
As with stories involving encounters with various foreign people, Asterix in Britain makes fun of common English stereotypes, though in the original publication both Rene Goscinny and Albert Uderzo included a foreword stating that this was done with no intention of insulting France's "famous rivals".

The story features several notable references, the most notable being:

- In the story, Asterix and Obelix head for a rugby match, in which one of the teams comes from Camulodunum and wear blue and white uniforms. Camulodunum is the ancient name of Colchester, while the uniforms are based on those wore by the footballers of Colchester United FC. The opposing team they face come from "Durovernum". The name references a Roman town and hilltop fort called Durovernum Cantiacorum that became the site for present-day Canterbury.
- The name Mykingdomforanos is a pun on the Shakespearean line "my kingdom for a horse" from the play Richard III. The name Encyclopaedicus Britannicus is a play on the real-life name of the general knowledge encyclopaedia, the Encyclopædia Britannica.
- In the French version of the comic, Goscinny and Uderzo used literal French translations of English expressions - for example "Je dis!", which is the translation of "I say!" In some of their work with English expressions, they stuck with French grammar rather than English, meaning some adjectives were placed before nouns, rather than after them. For the English translation, translators Anthea Bell and Derek Hockridge had several Briton characters speak with a stereotypical "upper class" English, such as for example "This is a jolly rum thing, eh, what?"
- The city of Londinium is based on the real-life Roman city that was founded in 47 AD. The comic's creators took some historical liberty in using it for some of the settings used in the comic.

== Adaptations ==
Asterix in Britain received two film adaptations of its story:

- An animated film of the same name was released in 1986 by both Dargaud and Gaumont. The French cast included Roger Carel and Pierre Tornade, whilst the English cast featured Jack Beaber and Bill Kearns; with Graham Bushnell voicing Anticlimax in both the French and English versions. The film followed the plot of the comic, but with some changes:
  - Dogmatix accompanies the group on their adventure.
  - Julius Caesar's role in the story was fleshed out by Goscinny and Uderzo, who also redesigned the character of Stratocumulus and gave him a more prominent role in the film.
  - The character Britannicus was replaced by a Roman general named Motus, while the character of Dipsomaniax was replaced with a Gaulish ex-pat called Gaullix.
  - A new character called Totalapsus was added to the story as a comic foil, who pursues the group but with little luck.
  - The tea herbs Asterix uses are acquired from a Phoenician merchant that Obelix saves from the Pirates.
- A live-action film, Asterix and Obelix: God Save Britannia, was released in 2012 by Fidélité Films, and starred Édouard Baer and Gérard Depardieu. The adaptation changed several aspects - including replacing Mykingdomforanos with the historical figure Queen Cordelia (portrayed as a parody of Elizabeth II), and Anticlimax's tribe being Scottish in appearance with tartan kilts - whilst also including a number of elements from Asterix and the Normans, including the character of Justforkix.

Alongside the film adaptations, an audiobook of the comic was released by EMI Records in 1987, under its Listen for Pleasure label. The adaptations was handled by Anthea Bell, and narrated by Willie Rushton.

== In other languages ==
Alongside the French and English version, Asterix in Britain has been translated into the following languages:

- Asturian
- Bengali
- Bosnian
- Breton
- Catalan
- Croatian
- Czech
- Danish
- Dutch
- Estonian
- Finnish
- Galician
- German
- Greek
- Hebrew
- Hungarian
- Icelandic
- Italian
- Irish
- Latin
- Norwegian
- Polish
- Portuguese
- Romanian
- Scots
- Scottish Gaelic
- Serbian
- Spanish
- Swedish
- Welsh
