= Asterix the Legionary =

Comic book album

Asterix the Legionary (Asterix Legionnaire)
- Date: 1970
- Series: Asterix

Creative team
- Writers: Rene Goscinny
- Artists: Albert Uderzo

Original publication
- Date of publication: 1967
- Language: French

Chronology
- Preceded by: Asterix and the Normans
- Followed by: Asterix and the Chieftain's Shield

Asterix the Legionary is the tenth Asterix book in the Asterix comic book series by Rene Goscinny and Albert Uderzo. It was first published as a serial in Pilote magazine, issues 368–389, in 1966.

== Synopsis ==
Asterix and Obelix are setting off for a wild boar hunt when they encounter Panacea, a former childhood resident of the village who has since moved to Condatum, and Obelix immediately falls in love with her. Some hours later, Panacea receives word that her fiancé, Tragicomix, has been forcibly-conscripted into the Roman army and shipped to North Africa; and Obelix, although heartbroken, promises to bring him back.

Asterix and Obelix travel to Condatum, where they learn that Tragicomix has already left for Massilia, the Mediterranean port from which the soldiers depart, and enlist themselves in the army to follow him, alongside Hemispheric the Goth; Selectivemploymentax the Briton; Gastronomix the Belgian; Neveratalos the Greek; and Ptenisnet, an Egyptian tourist who spends the entire book believing himself to be in a holiday camp.

After completing basic training (and repeatedly and comically driving their instructors to the verge of tears), the newly formed unit sets off as reinforcements to Caesar against Scipio, Afranius, and King Juba I of Numidia. Asterix and Obelix soon find out that Tragicomix has gone missing in action after a skirmish, and raid Scipio's camp to recover him. This results in the Battle of Thapsus, in which the confusion over the Gauls' unorthodox assault and the similarity of both armies' uniforms cause a default victory for Caesar after the frustrated Scipio sounds the retreat. The Gauls are cornered by Caesar after the battle is over; but released and sent home for their assistance in his victory. Asterix and Obelix thereafter celebrate at home, while Panacea and Tragicomix return to Condatum to marry.

== Film adaptations ==
- Elements of the plot of this album were combined with Asterix the Gladiator for the 1985 animated film Asterix Versus Caesar.
- The Raft of the Medusa sequence (see below) was incorporated into the 2002 live-action film Asterix & Obelix: Mission Cleopatra.

== Commentary ==
- This is the first time Asterix does not join the usual album-ending banquet (he is still visible in the final panel, albeit not at the banquet tables), an absence not repeated until Asterix and the Magic Carpet two decades later.
- When the pirates are first sunk, the ship's wreckage is a parody of the 19th century painting The Raft of the Medusa. In the English version, the pirate captain even bemoans, "We've been framed, by Jericho", a pun on the artist Géricault. In the French original, he says, "Je suis médusé" ("I am dumbfounded", or, most literally, "I am Medused").
- The legionaries in Asterix's unit are comic stereotypes of various nationalities, which parodies the French Foreign Legion's recruitment of foreigners.
- The hair of the Belgian legionary resembles that of the Belgian comic character Tintin.
- In the later part of the story, the Egyptian makes comments in hieroglyphics about hairy body parts — this is based on a child's game in France that involves repeating back a rhyme of whatever was last said in the form of "old hairy (body part)".
- The plot is partly inspired by a 1939 Laurel and Hardy film, The Flying Deuces (Les Conscrits), in which the pair join the French Foreign Legion after Hardy falls in love with a woman who turns out to have a husband in the legion. Laurel and Hardy later appeared as legionaries in Obelix & Co..
- The line "timeo Danaos et dona ferentes" ("I fear the Greeks, even those bearing gifts") is used as a standard mnemonic reference to Tragicomix's name.

== In other languages ==
- French – Astérix légionnaire
- German – Asterix als Legionär
- Croatian - Asterix legionar
- Spanish – Asterix legionario
- Catalan – Astèrix legionari
- Portuguese – Astérix Legionário
- Dutch – Asterix en het 1e Legioen
- Greek – Ο Αστερίξ λεγεωνάριος
- Finnish –Asterix legioonalaisena
- Irish - Asterix ar Pháirc an Chatha
- Scottish Gaelic - Asterix an Saighdear Ròmanach
- Italian – Asterix legionario
- Latin – Asterix Legionarius
- Korean – 로마군이 아스테릭스 –
- Danish – Asterix i trøjen
- Swedish – Asterix drar i fält
- Serbian – Астерикс, легионар/Asteriks, legionar
- Turkish – Asteriks Lejyoner
- Brazilian Portuguese – Asterix legionário
- Bengali – অ্যাস্টেরিক্স রোমান সৈনিক
