= Asterix and Cleopatra =

Sixth book in the Asterix comic book series

Asterix and Cleopatra (Astérix et Cléopâtre)
- Cover of the English edition
- Date: 1965
- Main characters: Asterix and Obelix
- Series: Asterix

Creative team
- Writers: René Goscinny
- Artists: Albert Uderzo

Original publication
- Published in: Pilote magazine
- Issues: 215–257
- Date of publication: 1963
- Language: French

Translation
- Translator: Anthea Bell and Derek Hockridge

Chronology
- Preceded by: Asterix and the Banquet
- Followed by: Asterix and the Big Fight

Asterix and Cleopatra (French: Astérix et Cléopâtre) is a French comic book written by René Goscinny and illustrated by Albert Uderzo. It is the sixth story in the Asterix comic book series, and was originally published by Dargaud as a serial for Pilote in 1963, before being released as a comic album in 1965.

The story focuses on Asterix and Obelix accompanying their village's druid, Getafix, to Ancient Egypt, in order to help an architect friend of his complete a major construction project that will allow Cleopatra to win a bet against Julius Caesar.

The comic received two film adaptations - an animated film of the same name in 1968, and a live-action film, Asterix & Obelix: Mission Cleopatra, in 2002. An audiobook adaptation was published by Hodder and Stoughton.

== Plot summary ==
In Egypt, Julius Caesar remarks to Cleopatra, queen of the Hellenistic Greek Ptolemaic Kingdom, how much the Egyptian civilisation has lost its grandeur when compared to that of the Romans. Insulted, Cleopatra makes a wager with him - she offers to build him a grand palace in Alexandria within three months; Caesar accepts, stating if she wins, he will change his opinion on her people. To handle the construction project, Cleopatra assigns Edifis, who claims to be the best architect in her kingdom, to build the palace; she promises to reward him greatly if he succeeds, but that his failure will see him fed to the sacred crocodiles of the Nile. Concerned with the task he has been given, Edifis decides to travel to Gaul, in order to request aid from his old friend Getafix, a druid who supplies his village with a magic potion that gives them superhuman strength to resist the Romans.

Getafix agrees to help, and travels back with Edifis to Egypt, accompanied by Asterix, Obelix, and Dogmatix - Obelix's new pet dog. As they begin to help with construction, Edifis flatly refuses the assistance of his rival Artifis, due to their work ethics. Angered by this, Artifis attempts to sabotage the palace's construction, before later having a henchman, Krukhut, trap Asterix and his friends in a pyramid. After the Gauls thwart his efforts, Artifis attempts to frame them for trying to poison Cleopatra - with a cake he prepared and sent on the pretense of being a gift from them. Getafix, seeking to prove their innocence, has himself and his friends eat the cake to claim it is safe - though with all of them using a potion to protect from the poison - and then making out Cleopatra's food taster, who was poisoned tasting the cake, is merely suffering from indigestion.

After being released, the Gauls find Edifis missing from the construction site, and suspect Artifis of kidnapping him. Asterix and Obelix promptly raid his home, where Krukhut panicks and reveals the missing architect was imprisoned in the basement. As punishment for their actions, the Gauls make Artifis and Krukhut help with construction, but without the aid of the magic potion. As construction nears completion, Caesar becomes suspicious at the progress being made and assigns an Egyptian spy, Mintjulep, to investigate. When he returns, Mintjulep explains about the presence of the Gauls and their magic potion, which prompts Caesar to order several of his legions to assault the construction site and capture them. Despite defending against the attack, Asterix and Dogmatix find themselves forced to deliver news of the attack to Cleopatra, when the Romans use catapults to shell the building site.

Caesar finds himself shamed by Cleopatra when she arrives, who calls him out for acting dishonourably with their wager. To make amends with her, he promptly has his legions repair the damage they caused. Construction is eventually completed on time, with Edfis rewarded with gold from Cleopatra; both he and Artifis later reconcile their differences and agree to work together on future projects. Delighted that Caesar honoured the conditions of their wager, Cleopatra thanks the Gauls, gifting Getafix with several papyrus manuscripts from the Library of Alexandria. The group soon return home to Gaul, where Obelix attempts to give his menhirs an Egyptian obelisk look, only to be criticised by Chief Vitalstatistix for doing so.

== Characters ==
- Asterix – Gaulish warrior, and the protagonist of the story.
- Obelix – Gaulish menhir delivery man and warrior, and a close friend of Asterix. The story fleshed out the character with some background surrounding the circumstances to his permanent superhuman strength which would go on to be a second recurring gag in later stories.
- Dogmatix – Obelix's pet dog, who is loyal to him and Asterix.
- Getafix – Gaulish druid, responsible for the superhuman magic potion his village uses.
- Julius Caesar – Leader of the Roman Empire (based upon the historical version of the real-life Roman figure).
- Cleopatra – Queen of the Egyptians of the Ptolemaic Kingdom (based upon the historical version of the real-life Ancient Egyptian queen).
- Edifis – An Egyptian architect and close friend of Getafix, who constructs buildings in which some still remain standing.
- Artifis – An Egyptian architect, formerly a friend of Edifis who is now his rival, due to his work ethics with labourers.
- Mintjulep – An Egyptian spy who serves the Romans.
- The Pirates – A group of pirates led by Captain Redbeard, who often suffer bad luck with the Gauls.

== Adaptations ==
Asterix and Cleopatra has received two film adaptations after its publication:

- In 1968, an animated film of the same name was released by Dargaud. Work on the animation process was overseen by Goscinny and Uderzo, who sought to produce a better quality film following the company's first film adaptation of the Asterix series. The animated film's French cast included Roger Carel and Jacques Morel, while its English cast included Lee Payant and Hal Brav.
- In 2002, a live-action adaptation of the comic was produced, Asterix & Obelix: Mission Cleopatra. Produced by TF1 Films Production at great expense, it starred Christian Clavier and Gérard Depardieu, and proved to be a huge box success in France.

An audiobook adaptation of Asterix and Cleopatra was created by Anthea Bell and Derek Hockridge. The story was narrated by Willie Rushton, and was released on Hodder and Stoughton's Hodder Children's Audio.
