= Asterix in Belgium =

1980 comic book volume

Asterix in Belgium (Astérix chez les Belges)
- Date: 1980
- Series: Asterix

Creative team
- Writers: René Goscinny
- Artists: Albert Uderzo

Original publication
- Date of publication: 1979
- Language: French

Chronology
- Preceded by: Obelix and Co.
- Followed by: Asterix and the Great Divide

Asterix in Belgium (French: Astérix chez les Belges, lit. 'Asterix among the Belgians/Belgae') is the twenty-fourth volume of the Asterix comic book series, by René Goscinny (story) and Albert Uderzo (illustrations).

It is noted as the last Asterix story from Goscinny, who died during its production. Uderzo completed the rest of the comic.

== Plot summary ==
After fighting the Belgians in the northern part of Gaul, Caesar states that they are the bravest enemies he has ever faced (historically claimed by Caesar). His soldiers agree with him, to the point when they consider being posted to the camps outside Asterix's village as a period of leave.

Chief Vitalstatistix is aghast at the idea that his village, which has been the terror of the Romans for years, is now looked upon as relatively harmless. He is further outraged when he hears of Caesar's remarks. He claims that "his villagers" are in fact the bravest men of Gaul, and travels to Belgium to prove his point. A reluctant Asterix and Obelix go with him after Getafix tells them not doing so could make the story come to a sticky end.

After crossing the border, they encounter a village of Belgians who rely on brute strength (and a regular diet of meat and beer) to successfully scare off Caesar's troops. These Belgians are led by two chiefs, Beefix of the Nervii and Brawnix of the Menapii (though Brawnix comes across mainly as a second-in-command).

To prove that the Gauls are the bravest, Vitalstatistix proposes a competition. The contest consists of raiding and destroying Roman camps on either side of the village. The Belgians and Gauls destroy the camps, telling the soldiers who they are. By the end they have destroyed an equal number of camps. Meanwhile, the Pirates' ship is wrecked when Obelix throws a boulder catapulted at him too high, causing the Captain to complain, saying he and his men are neutrals. Word is sent to Rome, though the facts are exaggerated, talking about vast hordes of Gauls, a savage pack of hounds, and a mysterious fleet of neutrals. Caesar goes to Belgium himself to restore order unaware of the fact that the whole thing is to get him to decide once and for all which side is the bravest.

Upon Caesar's arrival, Asterix and Obelix go to meet him under a flag of truce. Asterix proposes that Caesar meet both parties at an arranged meeting point and tell them they are equally brave so they can all go home. Outraged at being reduced to a mere umpire (as opposed to emperor), Caesar furiously declares that he will meet them in battle instead. In the ensuing fight, the Romans get their way in the early stages of the battle through the use of catapults. But then the three Gauls, and their magic potion, join the Belgians after they thwart a Roman flanking maneuver, and, by combining their efforts, the Gauls win the battle.

With the battle lost, Caesar decides to leave for Rome. On his way he comes across the Gaulish and Belgian chiefs. Caesar proudly announces that he will lay down his life, but the chiefs only want to know who is the bravest. Caesar angrily declares them simply all "crazy" and leaves Vitalstatistix and Beefix laughing the incident off. They have to face the fact that they are all equally brave and, after a victory feast, part on good terms.

== Commentary ==
Thomson and Thompson appear in Asterix in Belgium

- Goscinny died halfway through writing this album; as a homage to him, Uderzo drew darkened skies and rain into the comic for the rest of the album, to mark the point at which Goscinny died. This also serves as a spoof on the Belgian weather.
- A further tribute to Goscinny appears in the very last panel of the album: beneath the banquet scene, to the left of the panel, a rabbit glances mournfully at Goscinny's signature.
- Beefix's wife, Bonanza (Nicotine in the French version), is a caricature of Belgian actress and singer Annie Cordy.
- Beefix suggests to Bonanza about trying to cook french fries, and, after seeing a pile of mussels, wonders how fish would go with chips (potatoes were actually only introduced in Europe some 1600 years later). This new culinary discovery contradicts a scene from the earlier album Asterix and the Goths where the druid Valueaddedtax, for a demonstration of his pain-immunizing potion, fishes a bundle of fries (chips) out of a pot of boiling oil.
- This album features a small cameo on page 31 from the two detectives Thomson and Thompson from the world famous Belgian comic strip Tintin, who characteristically mispronounce the name of Julius Caesar. The scene is even drawn in a ligne claire style similar to that of Hergé, the author of the Tintin comics.
- On page 39, it also features the famous cyclist Eddy Merckx as a messenger.
- The entire final battle between the Gallo-Belgian and Roman sides is a parody of the Battle of Waterloo, in present-day Belgium. In the French edition, the text scrolls and quotes on them are a stylistic parody of Victor Hugo's text Les Châtiments, about the Battle of Waterloo; whereas even the English edition contains references to the same battle. During the battle the Roman commander is depicted as saying "La garde meurt mais ne se rend pas" ("The guard dies, it does not surrender!"), a quote attributed to the French general Pierre Cambronne at the Battle of Waterloo in 1815. The pose he takes while saying this is similar to Cambronne's statue in Nantes. Similarly, Julius Caesar believes his reinforcements have arrived, when in fact it is Asterix and Obelix, parodying Napoleon expecting his general Grouchy's army to arrive at the battle, only to encounter the forces of the Prussian general Blücher.
- Of all the Asterix books, this one contains the most literary references to earlier works, including Plutarch's Lives, Caesar's own Gallic Wars, and (in the English translation) Shakespeare's Tragedy of Julius Caesar.
- The picture of the victory feast at the Belgian village is a parody of the Flemish painting The Peasant Wedding (De Boerenbruiloft) by Pieter Bruegel the Elder. It was painted by Albert Uderzo's brother Marcel Uderzo.
- Botanix's young son is seen running to urinate, a reference to the iconic statue of Manneken Pis in Brussels.

== In other languages ==
- Catalan: Astèrix a Bèlgica
- Croatian: Asterix u Belgiji
- Czech: Asterix u Belgů
- Danish: Styrkeprøven
- Dutch: Asterix en de Belgen
- Estonian: Asterix Belgide juures
- Finnish: Asterix Belgiassa
- Galician: Astérix na terra dos belgas
- German: Asterix bei den Belgiern
- Greek: Ο Αστερίξ στους Βέλγους
- Icelandic: Ástríkur í Belgíu
- Italian: Asterix e i Belgi
- Norwegian: Styrkeprøven (The test of strength)
- Polish: Asteriks u Belgów
- Portuguese: Astérix entre os Belgas
- Serbian: Asteriks među Belgijancima
- Slovenian: Asterix pri Belgih
- Spanish: Astérix en Bélgica
- Turkish: Asteriks Belçika'da
- Indonesian: Asterik Di Belgia
- Swedish: Asterix i Belgien
