= Asterix the Gaul =

1st comic book in the Asterix series

Asterix the Gaul (Astérix le Gaulois)
- Cover of the English edition
- Date: 1961
- Main characters: Asterix and Obelix
- Series: Asterix

Creative team
- Writer: René Goscinny
- Artist: Albert Uderzo

Original publication
- Published in: Pilote magazine
- Issues: 1–40
- Date of publication: 29 October 1959 – 14 July 1960
- Language: French

Translation
- Publisher: Brockhampton Press
- Date: 1969
- Translator: Anthea Bell; Derek Hockridge

Chronology
- Followed by: Asterix and the Golden Sickle

Asterix the Gaul (French: Astérix le Gaulois) is a French comic story, written by René Goscinny and illustrated by Albert Uderzo. First published by Dargaud as a serial for Pilote magazine in October 1959, it was later released as a comic album in 1961. The story focuses on a Gaul named Asterix, whose village resists Roman rule, as he attempts to rescue his village's druid from a Roman garrison when its commander seeks to secure the secret of the village's superhuman strength.

The story proved hugely popular with French readers, leading to Goscinny and Uderzo writing further stories that would go on to form the Asterix comic strip series, with international versions of the comic helping to broaden its appeal outside of France. Dargaud later developed an animated adaptation of the comic for theatrical release in 1967 with its own production company, though Goscinny and Uderzo disapproved of the poor animation quality; they later blocked a sequel based on their next story. Alongside the film, an audiobook adaptation was created by EMI Records.

In 1999 Asterix the Gaul was voted as the 23rd greatest book of the 20th century, in a poll conducted across France by French retailer Fnac and the Paris newspaper Le Monde for Le Monde's 100 Books of the Century.

== Plot ==
In 50 B.C., following Julius Caesar's defeat of Vercingetorix at the Battle of Alesia, the entirety of Gaul is brought under the control of the Romans, with the exception of a small village in Armorica (present-day Brittany) whose inhabitants constantly hold back their forces. Determined to uncover their secret, Centurion Crismus Bonus, commander of the camp of Compendium, sends a spy into the village. The spy reveals that the village's druid, Getafix, periodically supplies the villagers with a magic potion that grants them superhuman strength. Amazed, Crismus Bonus orders Getafix's capture, hoping to gain control over the magic potion.

Asterix, a warrior from the village, learns of Getafix's kidnapping from a cart-seller and decides to infiltrate the Roman camp to rescue him. Once inside the camp that evening, Asterix overhears Crismus Bonus talking with his second-in-command, Marcus Ginantonicus, about his plans to use the magic potion to initiate a rebellion against Rome that will overthrow Caesar. When Asterix finds Getafix, he informs him of what he learnt and comes up with a plan to prevent this from happening.

The following morning Asterix lets himself be captured and pretends to give in to torture, whereupon Getafix pretends to give in and agree to make the potion. After securing the ingredients he needs, Getafix tricks Crismus Bonus that he needs strawberries, only for him and Asterix to consume them all once the Romans find some. Eventually, Getafix uses the ingredients he collected to brew a potion which he tricks Crismus Bonus and the Romans to drink, unaware it will cause their hair and beards to grow at an accelerated rate for at least a day.

After tricking Crismus Bonus to let them gather ingredients for an "antidote" to the potion, Getafix supplies the camp with vegetable soup. However, he secretly collects what is needed for the magic potion, which Asterix uses to help them escape from their captors. Before they make for their village, the pair discover Roman reinforcements have arrived, led by Caesar, who becomes suspicious about what has recently occurred in Compendium. Asterix soon exposes Crismus Bonus' intentions, prompting Caesar to exile him and his men to Outer Mongolia for their treachery, while allowing the Gauls to leave on the grounds of a truce. Asterix and Getafix eventually return to their village, which celebrates by holding a banquet for their success.

== Characters ==
- Asterix – Gaulish warrior, and the main protagonist of the story.
- Getafix – Gaulish druid.
- Obelix – Gaulish menhir delivery man and warrior, and a close friend of Asterix. Although having a minor role in this story, the character would later gain more prominence in the comic series.
- Vitalstatistix – Chief of the Gaulish village
- Cacofonix – Gaulish bard of the village.
- Fulliautomatix – Gaulish blacksmith.
- Julius Caesar – Leader of Rome in 50 B.C. (based upon the historical version of the real-life Roman figure). Following the novel, the character's appearance was changed to better reflect his historical counterpart.
- Crismus Bonus – Roman Centurion in charge of Camp Compendium.
- Marcus Ginantonicus – Second-in-command at Compendium. The character's design was oddly altered a few pages after they first appear in the novel.
- Caligula Minus – A Roman soldier at Compendium, assigned to spy on the Gaulish village.

== Publishing history ==
The story was first published as a serial in Pilote magazine, a Franco-Belgian comics magazine founded by Goscinny and a few other comic artists.

The first page appeared in the promotional issue #0, distributed on 1 June 1959, and the story was serially published in the magazine from issue #1 (29 October 1959) until issue #38 (14 July 1960). A small head of Asterix first appeared on the cover of #9 (24 December 1959), and a full Asterix cover was used on #21 (17 March 1960).

The next story, Asterix and the Golden Sickle, started in issue #42 (11 August 1960).

Asterix le Gaulois was published in July 1961 by Dargaud in the so-called "Pilote collection" with a print of 6000 copies. A Dutch translation followed in 1966, and other languages followed soon after.

The English translation by Anthea Bell and Derek Hockridge was first published in 1969 by Brockhampton Press.

The plate for page 35 was redrawn by Albert Uderzo's brother Marcel in 1970 because the original was lost. This is why there are some slight differences in the drawing style. All English versions from Hodder & Stoughton (Hodder Dargaud) use the original illustrations, which were made from a copy of an actual printed page, hence the blurriness. The 2004 release from Orion Books uses the redone illustrations from the French editions.

An audiobook of Asterix the Gaul adapted by Anthea Bell and narrated by Willie Rushton was released on EMI Records Listen for Pleasure label in 1990.

On 29 October 2009, Google prominently featured an integration of Asterix and Obelix in its mast head, celebrating the 50th anniversary of the first publication.

The 2019 American Papercutz edition presents a few changes:

- Getafix is named Panoramix, the same name used in the original French edition.
- The Roman Camps of Totorum and Compendium are renamed to Butterdrum and Lilchum, respectively.
- The original decurion's name is changed from Julius Pompus to Julius Pompilius.
- It changes all references to the Circus Maximus to the Colosseum, even though in the timeline it wouldn't be built for another 120 years.

== Film adaptation ==
In 1967, Dargaud released an animated adaptation of the novel, under the same name, for theatrical release - though originally, the company planned for it to air on French television. However, the film was made without consultation with Goscinny and Uderzo, who were unaware of its production until a few months before its release date. Neither approved of the quality of the animation by the team Dargaud employed, and later blocked the company from making a planned adaptation of Asterix and the Golden Sickle, only allowing for further adaptations on the grounds that they had involvement in future animated films for Dargaud.

== See also ==
- Le Monde's 100 Books of the Century
