= Obelix and Co. =

23rd comic book in the Asterix series

Obelix and Co. (Obélix et Compagnie)
- Date: 1978
- Series: Asterix

Creative team
- Writers: Rene Goscinny
- Artists: Albert Uderzo

Original publication
- Date of publication: 1976
- Language: French

Chronology
- Preceded by: Asterix Conquers Rome
- Followed by: Asterix in Belgium

Obelix and Co. is the twenty-third volume of the Asterix comic book series, by René Goscinny (stories) and Albert Uderzo (illustrations). The book's main focus is on the attempts by the Gaul-occupying Romans to corrupt the one remaining village that still holds out against them by instilling capitalism. It is one of only two albums not to have the word “Asterix” in the title in the English translation (along with The Mansions of the Gods). It is also the penultimate volume written by Goscinny before his death in 1977 and also the final one he fully wrote; his final volume, Asterix in Belgium, was incomplete by the time of his death and was released posthumously in 1979.

== Plot summary ==
After Obelix single-handedly defeats a newly arrived battalion of Roman soldiers, Julius Caesar ponders over how to defeat the village of rebellious Gauls. A young advisor Preposterus, using his studies in economics, proposes that the Gauls to be integrated into capitalism, pointing out how Caesar's advisors have grown decadent with their wealth. Caesar agrees and sends Preposterus to one of the village's outlying Roman camps. Upon meeting Obelix carrying a menhir through the forest, Preposterus offers to buy the menhir and make Obelix a rich man, on the pretext it will give him influence, by buying every menhir he can make. Obelix agrees and begins making and delivering a single menhir a day to him.

Preposterus raises the demand for menhirs, forcing Obelix to hire villagers – while some aid him, the others hunt boar for himself and his new workers. The resulting workload causes him to neglect his faithful companion Dogmatix, while Asterix refuses to help him, concerned on what this is doing to him. As Obelix grows wealthy and begins wearing ostentatious clothes, many of the village's men are criticised by their wives for not matching his success. In response, many turn to making their own menhirs to sell to the Romans, with Getafix supplying them with magic potion for their work. While everyone (except for Asterix, Getafix, Cacofonix and Vitalstatistix) profits from the growing menhir demand, Asterix believes that this new change will not last.

Preposterus brings the excess stock of menhirs to Caesar, who is upset that Preposterus' plan is placing him in financial debt. Preposterus proposes to sell the menhirs to patricians on the pretext they are a symbol of great wealth and high rank. However, other provinces begin making their own menhirs to sell, creating a growing Menhir crisis that is crippling the Roman economy and threatening a civil conflict from the Empire's workforce. To put a stop to this, Caesar orders Preposterus to cease further trading with Gauls or face being thrown to the lions.

Meanwhile, Obelix becomes miserable from the wealth and power he made, having never understood it all, and how much it has changed other villagers, making him wish to go back to how life was with Asterix and Dogmatix. Asterix offers to go hunting boar with him if he reverts to his old clothes. When Preposterus arrives to announce he will stop buying menhirs, the villagers claim Obelix knew of this in advance and they fight with him. Asterix instead convinces the villagers to attack the Romans, and while Obelix sits out the fight, they wreck the camp and Preposterus. The menhir crisis caused the villagers sestertius to be devalued, and the village holds a traditional banquet to celebrate the return to normality.

== Economic issues ==
- The book is a parody of capitalism:
  - While Obelix could hunt boar before, he begins to overwork for the purpose of buying them (and ridiculous clothing). This pointless circle of money is something Obelix never understands in the first place, when all this stress could be prevented by simply hunting and living the simple life like before.
  - Capitalism is also looked at as pointless through the fact that the only thing that represents it by being bought serves no practical purpose, as a menhir is simply a large stone.
- When the makers of Roman menhirs are banned from selling their stock, they block the Roman roads in protest at the loss of their jobs.
- The London School of Economics is referred to as the Latin School of Economics, where Preposterus is trained. It is the École Nationale d'Administration (ENA) through the Nouvelle École d'Affranchis (NEA) in the original.

== Cultural references ==
- The character of Preposterus is a parody of French politician Jacques Chirac, then Prime Minister under President Valéry Giscard d'Estaing, and himself President of the Republic from 1995 to 2007.
- On page 27, Laurel and Hardy make an appearance as Roman legionaries ordered to unload the menhirs from Obelix's cart.
- When, on page 2, the Romans leave the camp, two of the legionaries are carrying a drunk on a shield. The bearers are Goscinny and Uderzo themselves and the drunk is their friend Pierre Tchernia.
- In this story, camp life for the Roman legionaries is shown as undisciplined and complacent, mostly due to the lack of any conflict with the Gaulish villagers during the Menhir trade. In other Asterix adventures they are usually vigilant, clean-shaven, and well-organized; but here the men's faces are covered in stubble and life is almost anarchic. This laxity is represented in the watchtower guard, who becomes increasingly dishevelled with every appearance.
- Page 36 of this book was the 1000th page of Asterix. It is the page in which Preposterus uses a number of stone tablets in order to explain his strategy of selling menhirs to an increasingly bewildered Caesar. This panel had been hailed as a remarkable explanation of modern commerce and advertising. To mark this special page 36, there is a small panel with the names of the authors, and right under another small panel with the Roman numeral M, meaning 1000th, and below a tiny Latin text saying 'Albo notamba lapillo'. It should read 'Albo notanda lapillo', which means literally "To be noted with a white stone" and has given the well-known French expression "à marquer d'une pierre blanche", meaning in English "to go down as a milestone" (alternatively this expression is used in referring more precisely to a calendar day, probable origin of the expression in the Antiquity : albo notanda lapillo dies, "day to be noted with a white stone", meaning "red letter day"-), but it is here purposely misspelled in Latin : "notamba", a pun in French meaning "note en bas", literally "note at the bottom" or footnote, which is what the panel is.
- Getafix's comment on page 30 "And the funny thing is, we still don't know what menhirs are for!" refers to the fact that modern archeologists and historians are uncertain what purpose they served.
- The "Egyptian menhir" advertised in Rome is an obelisk, similar to Cleopatra's Needle.

== In other languages ==
- Catalan: Obèlix i companyia
- Croatian: Obelix d.o.o.
- Czech: Obelix & spol.
- Danish: Obelix & Co. ApS
- Dutch: Obelix & co.
- Estonian: Ärimees Obelix
- Finnish: Obelix ja kumpp.
- German: Obelix GmbH & Co. KG
- Greek: Οβελίξ και Σία
- Hebrew: אובליקס וחבורתו
- Hungarian: Obelix és társa
- Indonesian: Obèlix dan Kawan-kawan
- Italian: Asterix e la Obelix SpA
- Norwegian: Obelix & Co. A/S
- Polish: Obeliks i spółka
- Portuguese: Obélix e Companhia
- Turkish: Oburiks ve Şirketi
- Serbian: Obeliksovo preduzeće
- Spanish: Obélix y compañía
- Swedish: Obelix & Co.
