= Asterix and the Great Crossing =

Comic book album

Asterix and the Great Crossing (La Grande Traversée)
- Date: 1977
- Series: Asterix

Creative team
- Writers: Rene Goscinny
- Artists: Albert Uderzo

Original publication
- Date of publication: 1975
- Language: French

Chronology
- Preceded by: Asterix and Caesar's Gift
- Followed by: Asterix Conquers Rome

Asterix and the Great Crossing is the twenty-second volume of the Asterix comic book series, by René Goscinny (stories) and Albert Uderzo (illustrations).

== Plot summary ==
Unhygienix has run out of fresh fish. Since his stock has to be transported from Lutetia (modern-day Paris), it will be some time before the next delivery of fish. However Getafix says he cannot wait since he needs some for his potion. Asterix and Obelix volunteer to resolve the issue by going fishing, to which end they borrow a boat from Geriatrix. After a storm, they get lost, but despite Obelix's concerns, they do not reach the edge of the world; instead, following a brief encounter with the pirates, they arrive on an island (which the reader surmises is Manhattan Island) with delicious birds that the Gauls call "gobblers" (turkeys), bears and "Romans" with strange facial paintings (Native Americans).

Soon they earn the "Romans" affection, but they decide to leave after the "centurion" chooses Obelix as his rather Rubenesque daughter's fiancé. They go to a small island (which the reader surmises is Liberty Island). Seeing a boat coming, Asterix climbs a cairn of rocks holding a torch and a book like the Statue of Liberty to attract it. The crew are anachronistic Norsemen (with names like Herendethelessen, Steptøånssen, Nøgøødreåssen, Håråldwilssen, Irmgard, Firegård, and their Great Dane, Huntingseåssen) – who managed a Pre-Columbian trans-oceanic contact and take the Gauls, who they thought to be the local natives, to their homeland as proof that there are continents beyond Europe.

The Gauls wanting to return home, and the Vikings' eagerness to prove their story of a new world, results in a trip back to Europe to the Vikings' homeland. The Vikings' chief, Ødiuscomparissen, greets them and is skeptical of their stories, until he sees the Gauls. They plan a celebration, then attempt to sacrifice the "natives", much to the chagrin of the other Vikings ("Why? They haven't done anything!").

Before this can be carried out, a Gaulish prisoner called Catastrofix, who can understand both Gallic and Norse, stirs up Ødiuscomparissen's suspicion that Herendethelessen is a liar, causing a fight between the Norsemen with the assumption that Herendethelessen has simply gone to Gaul rather than to a new world. Meanwhile, the Gauls escape. This escape is conducive to their original purpose, since Catastrofix is a fisherman and hence able to procure some fish for the magic potion. Unhygenix, however, prefers the scent of his own stock, a preference that explains why his product is such a delicate topic.

== Commentary ==
- Asterix and Obelix discover a turkey and decide to eat it. Asterix says it tastes good, but Obelix notes that it might be better to stuff it with another type of food. This is a reference to Thanksgiving, when American families traditionally eat stuffed Thanksgiving turkey and also that turkey stuffed with chestnuts is a traditional Christmas dish in France.
- On page 21 Asterix calls the country "a New World", a reference to the nickname 16th century discoverers gave America. He also claims that in this place everything is possible. Asterix is actually talking about possible dangers, but the authors wrote this quote as a reference to the American Dream.
- When Obelix punches one of the attacking Native Americans K.O. the warrior first sees American-style emblematic eagles; the second time he sees stars in the formation of the Stars and Stripes; the third time, he sees stars shaped like the United States Air Force roundel.
- On page 29 Obelix claims that this way he will certainly not be eating cold dog meat. This is a reference to hot dogs.
- Asterix's idea for getting the attention of the nearby Viking ship by holding up a torch references the Statue of Liberty (which was a gift from France). Obelix is first sceptical, but when Asterix reminds him that if they don't try this plan he will have to marry the Native American Chief's daughter, Obelix gets frightened and states "I value my liberty", as another reference to the Statue of Liberty.
- The idea that Vikings reached America centuries before Columbus is one that was seriously considered at the time and is now seen as fact. However, the Vikings landed in America around 1000 CE, roughly a thousand years after the time period where Asterix is set.
- When the Vikings set foot on American ground Herendethelessen paraphrases Neil Armstrong's famous quote: "It's one small step for a man, one giant leap for mankind," defending the quote on the grounds that it "just came to [him]".
- When the Native American scout who got caught by Obelix related what happened to his Chief with physical actions is probably a reference to different tribes of them communicating with each other through sign language.
- On the night when Asterix and Obelix were welcomed into the tribe of Native Americans, the latter found out from the chief that their dinner is dog meat which is probably a reference to certain tribes viewing it as a delicacy.
- In the original French version, on page 32, Obelix claims he learned a thing or two while he was at the prairie and uses the word "yep!". This is a reference to westerns, and incidentally to Franco-Belgian comics series Lucky Luke, also written by René Goscinny at the time, set in the American Old West, and whose titular character frequently used the expression. In the English translation this is rendered as "I've sure learnt a thing or two home on this range."
- On page 36 the Vikings give Asterix and Obelix beads, just like 15th–17th century European settlers gave beads to the native tribes in America.
- The nationality of the Vikings in this story is Danish, while the Vikings in the earlier Asterix and the Normans were depicted as Norsemen, a more general term. Several references make this clear:
  - This is made clear by several references to William Shakespeare's play about the Danish prince Hamlet. Odiuscomparissen at one point says: "Something is rotten in the state of ..." while holding a skull in his hand. In the play, the character Marcellus claims "something is rotten in the state of Denmark", and Hamlet delivers a monologue on death while holding the exhumed skull of his childhood playmate, the court jester Yorick. Towards the end of the comic Herendethelessen is seen wondering if he is a discoverer or not? He concludes by quoting Hamlet: "To be or not to be, that's the question."
  - When the Vikings' village is in sight, Herendethelessen tells his crewmembers to get ready to be covered with honors only for them to be greeted by an angry booming voice. Steptøånssen remarks that it is their fearsome chief Odiuscomparissen, to which Herendethelessen tells him that it certainly is not a mermaid – a reference to the statue The Little Mermaid in the port of Danish capital Copenhagen.
  - Herendethelessen's dog, Huntingseåssen, is a Great Dane.
  - Pseudo-Danish spelling (English replacing all the O's by Ø's and all the A's by Å's) is used for the Vikings' speech.
  - The Norwegian version neatly avoided some of the Danish references by naming Hereendeththelessen after the historical Leiv Eiriksson, making a point of his father's red hair (Eirik Raude). Thus, a Norwegian reader instinctively puts the Viking village on Iceland or possibly Greenland.
- In the English translation a Viking in the voyage is named Håråldwilssen, presumably because the English translators felt he shared Harold Wilson's physical features.

== Film adaptation ==
- The 1994 animated film Asterix Conquers America, starring Craig Charles as the voice of Asterix and Howard Lew Lewis as the voice of Obelix, is based on this book. The most noticeable differences between the book and the film is that in the film, Getafix accompanies Asterix to America – albeit because he had been abducted by Romans seeking to get rid of him by throwing him off the edge of the world – and that the Vikings do not appear in the film.

== In other languages ==
- Catalan: La gran travessia
- Croatian: Onkraj oceana (Beyond ocean)
- Czech: Asterix a Velká zámořská plavba
- Danish: Asterix opdager Amerika (Asterix discovers America)
- Dutch: De grote oversteek
- Estonian: Asterix ja suur mereretk
- Finnish: Asterix ja suuri merimatka (Asterix and the Great Sea Journey)
- Galician: A gran travesía
- German: Die große Überfahrt
- Greek: Το μεγάλο ταξίδι
- Hebrew: אסטריקס מגלה את אמריקה (Asterix discovers America)
- Icelandic: Ástríkur heppni
- Italian: Asterix in America
- Norwegian: Asterix oppdager Amerika (Asterix discovers America)
- Polish: Wielka przeprawa
- Portuguese: A grande Travessia
- Russian: Астерикс и Великое Плавание
- Serbian: Velika plovidba
- Spanish: La Gran Travesía
- Swedish: Resan över Atlanten
- Turkish: Büyük Yolculuk
- Ukrainian: Астерікс та Обелікс завойовують Америку

== See also ==
- Asterix Conquers America
- Pre-Columbian trans-oceanic contact
