= Asterix and the Great Divide =

Comic book album

Asterix and the Great Divide (Le Grand Fossé)
- Date: 1981
- Series: Asterix

Creative team
- Writer: Albert Uderzo
- Artist: Albert Uderzo

Original publication
- Date of publication: 1980
- Language: French

Chronology
- Preceded by: Asterix in Belgium
- Followed by: Asterix and the Black Gold

Asterix and the Great Divide (French: Le Grand Fossé, "The Great Ditch") is the twenty-fifth volume of the Asterix comic book series. First published in French in 1980, it was translated into English in 1981. It is the first Asterix adventure to be written by illustrator Albert Uderzo, following the death of Asterix co-creator and writer René Goscinny in 1977.

== Plot summary ==
A village in Gaul is politically and physically divided by a deep ditch because of a leadership dispute between rival chiefs Cleverdix and Majestix. Efforts to overcome their differences, first through dialogue and then through battle, only widen the rift. Majestix's fishy advisor Codfix, suggests intervention by the local Roman garrison will enable Majestix to become the sole chief, in return for which, Codfix wants to marry his daughter, Melodrama. Majestix agrees to the plan, unaware that Codfix intends to overthrow him.

Melodrama reveals the plan to her lover, Histrionix, who is Cleverdix's son. He is sent to the village of Vitalstatistix, who assigns Asterix and Obelix, accompanied by Getafix, to prevent Roman intervention.

Codfix promises the local Roman centurion he can take Cleverdix's followers as slaves for the legionaries, but Majestix refuses to allow his opponents to be enslaved. Enraged, the centurion imprisons Majestix and his followers. Asterix, Obelix and Getafix infiltrate the Romans' camp with the intention of releasing the prisoners. At the camp entrance, Getafix inadvertently leaves behind a flask of elixir, which restores a subject to full health while erasing his memory of the injury necessitating it. Codfix secretly observes a demonstration of the elixir and then takes the flask.

Inside the camp, Getafix makes his usual magic potion in the guise of soup. When the suspicious centurion orders them to test it for poison, they give it to the prisoners, enabling them to defeat the Romans. Back at the village, Getafix makes more potion, and places it at a house spanning the ditch, with Asterix on watch. Codfix uses Getafix's elixir to cure the Romans and exploits their amnesia to claim the Gauls attacked the Romans unprovoked. That night, he returns to his village and seizes the potion, which (after having drunk it himself) he conveys to the Romans.

Unfortunately, at the next day's battle, the mixture of the two potions causes the Romans to inflate like balloons and then shrink to minuscule size. Terrified by this transformation, they promise to leave the local Gauls in peace. Meanwhile, Codfix has kidnapped Melodrama for a ransom of 100 pounds of gold. Histrionix goes after him, accompanied by Asterix and Obelix.

Codfix, escaping via river with Melodrama, is captured by the series' recurrent pirates and offers them a share of the ransom. They are then attacked by the Gauls. Having consumed some magic potion, Histrionix duels Codfix, rendering the Pirates' ship once again a sunken wreck. Histrionix takes the upper hand and strikes Codfix for a literal mile into the Roman camp. At the village, the chieftains agree to a single combat fight but it eventually ends in a draw, whereupon Asterix, as referee, declares Histrionix chief instead. The villagers then divert the nearby river, filling the ditch, while Codfix is shown as the Romans' sole drudge. Histrionix and Melodrama are married, and Asterix, Obelix and Getafix return home.

== Commentary ==
- Uderzo intended the Great Divide as a metaphor and condemnation of the Berlin Wall, which once separated Socialist East Berlin from Democratic West Berlin. The wall was torn down nine years after this album was published.
- An audiobook of Asterix and the Great Divide adapted by Anthea Bell and Derek Hockridge and narrated by Willie Rushton was released on Hodder and Stoughton's Hodder Children's Audio in 1987.
- This was the first volume of the series that was designed and written by Albert Uderzo alone, after the death of his long-time collaborator René Goscinny, and published by his own company, "Editions Albert René".
- In the English translation, Getafix laments - "Change and decay in all around I see" is taken from Henry Francis Lyte's hymn, Abide with Me.
