= Derek Hockridge =

English translator of Asterix

- Born: 1934; Wales
- Died: 8 August 2013 (aged 78–79)
- Occupations: translator, teacher, lecturer, actor

Derek Hockridge (1934 – 8 August 2013) was a British translator, teacher, lecturer, and occasional actor, who was perhaps best known for his translations of the Asterix comic book series.

Born in Wales and brought up in Birmingham, he completed a degree in French at the University of Wales, Cardiff, which was followed by teacher training at St Edmund Hall, Oxford. Subsequently, he was a French teacher at Manchester Grammar School, then a lecturer at Leicester Polytechnic. During this time, with Anthea Bell, he translated the Asterix comic books, which were written by René Goscinny and illustrated by Albert Uderzo.

He appeared in the television series Crown Court, in which he played the clerk of the court, and played a clerk of court on Lady Killers. He also featured in minor parts in Brideshead Revisited and The Jewel in the Crown.

He retired to Swanage, Dorset, and died on 8 August 2013.
