= 1964 Nobel Peace Prize =

Award

- Martin Luther King Jr.
- Date: 14 October 1964 (announcement); 10 December 1964 (ceremony)
- Location: Oslo, Norway
- Presented by: Norwegian Nobel Committee
- First award: 1901
- Website: Official website

The 1964 Nobel Peace Prize was awarded to the American Baptist minister and activist Martin Luther King Jr. (1929–1968) "for his non-violent struggle for civil rights for the Afro-American population." He is the twelfth American recipient of the prestigious Peace Prize.

== Laureate ==
An adherent of Gandhi's principle of nonviolence, Rev. King began his efforts to persuade the U.S. Government to declare uncivil all the policies of racial discrimination in the southern states. His nonviolent struggle for civil rights and equality encountered violence and threats from racists and white supremacists. In 1963, more than 250,000 demonstrators marched to the Lincoln Memorial in Washington, where he gave his influential speech "I Have a Dream" in which he called for civil and economic rights and an end to racism in the United States. The following year, President Lyndon B. Johnson signed the law prohibiting all racial discrimination. Finding resistance from white officials, Rev. King lead another peaceful march in 1965 to totally end racial segregation and recognize African-Americans constitutional right to vote. In April 1968, he was assassinated for his civil rights advocacy, which was later continued by his wife, Coretta Scott King, and other surviving pioneers of the movement.

== Deliberations ==
=== Nominations ===
Reverend King had not been nominated before for the peace prize, making him one of the laureates who won on a rare occasion when they have been awarded the Nobel Prize the same year they were first nominated. He received only two nominations: from Colin W. Bell (1903–1988) of the American Friends Service Committee and a joint nomination by 8 members of the Swedish Parliament.

In total, the Norwegian Nobel Committee received 92 nominations for 36 individuals and 8 organizations including Vinoba Bhave, Charles Braibant, Cyrus S. Eaton, Adolfo López Mateos, Trygve Lie, Clarence Streit, the UNICEF (awarded in 1965) and the Universal Esperanto Association. Thirteen individuals and two organizations were nominated for the first time such as Lyndon B. Johnson, Josef Hromádka, Norman Thomas, Mohammad Reza Pahlavi, Abraham Vereide, Paul-Henri Spaak and Oxford Committee for Famine Relief. Austrian philanthropist Hermann Gmeiner had the highest number of nominations with 25 different recommendations. No women were nominated that year. Notable figures like Molly Childers, Anna J. Cooper, Elizabeth Gurley Flynn, Douglas MacArthur, Jeanne Mélin, Karl Polanyi and Georg Friedrich Nicolai died in 1964 without having been nominated for the peace prize while the American philanthropist Stephen Galatti died months before the announcement.

Official list of nominees and their nominators for the prize
No.	Nominee	Country/ Headquarters	Motivations	Nominator(s)
Individuals
1	Charles Henry Alexandrowicz (1902–1975)	Poland	"for founding the Indian Year Book of International Affairs and the Grotian Society, and through these strengthening the bonds between the nations of the world, especially those of Asia and the West."	Rama Ras (?)
2	Clement Attlee (1883–1967)	United Kingdom	"for his fine work for the cause of world government, amongst other work, speaking on numerous occasions in the House of Lords."	Lance Mallalieu (1905–1979)
3	Vinoba Bhave (1895–1982)	India	"for his peaceful work for social justice, and his contribution to world peace"	Dominique Pire, O.P. (1910–1969)
4	Charles Braibant (1889–1976)	France	"for his work with International Archive Associations and facilitating understanding between people of different nationalities."	René Pleven (1901–1993)
5	Fenner Brockway (1888–1988)	United Kingdom	No reason given for nomination.	5 members of the Government of Mauritius
6	Martin Buber (1878–1965)	Austria; Israel	No reason given for nomination.	Michael Landmann (1913–1984)
7	Frederick Burdick (?)(prob. Eugene Burdick (1918–1965))	United States	"for his work at the Gist that is helping end and prevent wars."	Kenneth J. Gray (1924–2014)
7	Frederick Burdick (?)(prob. Eugene Burdick (1918–1965))	United States	"for his work as an editor on the Gist Research, writing and influencing public opinion about important humanitarian causes."	Philip J. Philbin (1898–1972)
8	Grenville Clark (1882–1967)	United States	"for working towards developing an effective organization for world peace, which resulted in his book World Peace through World Law (1958) and he has also been meeting with the leaders of the world to advance the cause of world peace."	Erwin Griswold (1904–1994)
9	Norman Cousins (1915–1990)	United States	"for being an effective and eloquent advocate for peace through his able editorship at Saturday Review and his books, which put a sharp focus on the dangers of the nuclear age."	Arturo Orzábal de la Quintana (1892–1969)
10	Josué de Castro (1908–1973)	Brazil	"for his outstanding service to the establishment of permanent peace and towards the abolishment of hunger"	Gilbert McAllister (1906–1964)
11	Cyrus S. Eaton (1883–1979)	Canada; United States	"for his unswerving devotion to friendship and understanding among nations of the world, especially between the Soviet Union and the United States.	Jennings Randolph (1902–1998)
11	Cyrus S. Eaton (1883–1979)	Canada; United States	"for his tireless work for peace"	Léon Méthot (1895–1972)
11	Cyrus S. Eaton (1883–1979)	Canada; United States	"for his great and noble work for peace and co-existence, and for being the pioneer and promoter of a policy of appeasement between East and West."	Alexander Neil McLean (1885–1967)
12	Friedrich Wilhelm Foerster (1869–1966)	Germany	"for being a champion for peace by writing books and holding lectures on the topic, even in the warmongering state of Nazi Germany."	Alfred Verdross (1890–1980)
13	Stephen Galatti (1888–1964)	United States	"for founding American Field Service International Scholarships, an organization that grants scholarships to students who try to further understanding between countries."	Bjarne Lyngstad (1901–1971)
14	Gordon Gilkey (1912–2000)	United States	"for his non-profit International Exchange Program of Exhibits, which advances peace through international educational and cultural understanding."	Clarence Hovland (1922–2012)
15	Hermann Gmeiner (1919–1986)	Austria	"for his work with SOS Children's Villages."	Harry Harley (1926–2014)
15	Hermann Gmeiner (1919–1986)	Austria	"for his work with SOS Children's Villages."	Alfred Debré (?)
15	Hermann Gmeiner (1919–1986)	Austria	"for his work with SOS Children's Villages."	René Jager (?)
15	Hermann Gmeiner (1919–1986)	Austria	"for his work with SOS Children's Villages."	René Radius (1907–1994)
15	Hermann Gmeiner (1919–1986)	Austria	"for his work with SOS Children's Villages."	Fritz-Joachim von Rintelen (1898–1970)
15	Hermann Gmeiner (1919–1986)	Austria	"for his work with SOS Children's Villages."	Gerhard Hafström (1904–1985)
15	Hermann Gmeiner (1919–1986)	Austria	"for his work with SOS Children's Villages."	Franz Josef Brecht (1899–1982)
15	Hermann Gmeiner (1919–1986)	Austria	"for his work with SOS Children's Villages."	Karl August Bettermann (1913–2005)
15	Hermann Gmeiner (1919–1986)	Austria	"for his work with SOS Children's Villages."	Clemens Riedel (1914–2003)
15	Hermann Gmeiner (1919–1986)	Austria	"for his work with SOS Children's Villages."	Arthur Kaufmann (1923–2001)
15	Hermann Gmeiner (1919–1986)	Austria	"for his work with SOS Children's Villages."	Joachim Kopper (1925–2013)
15	Hermann Gmeiner (1919–1986)	Austria	"for his work with SOS Children's Villages."	Peter Scheibert (1915–1995)
15	Hermann Gmeiner (1919–1986)	Austria	"for his work with SOS Children's Villages as it promotes understanding and reconciliation between people."	Karl Glaser (1921–2006)
15	Hermann Gmeiner (1919–1986)	Austria	"for founding SOS Children's Villages and addressing the problem of abandoned children and youth."	G. M. Sibille (?)
15	Hermann Gmeiner (1919–1986)	Austria	"for founding SOS Children's Villages and his unselfish work that promotes peace across the borders."	Edmund Siun (?)
15	Hermann Gmeiner (1919–1986)	Austria	"for his work with SOS Children's Villages, and his social work with the orphans and refugees after World War II."	Klubomann (?)
15	Hermann Gmeiner (1919–1986)	Austria	"for his work with SOS Children's Villages, which promotes peace from the root of society."	Joseph Lortz (1887–1975)
15	Hermann Gmeiner (1919–1986)	Austria	for his work with SOS Children's Villages and encouraging understanding between people."	Béla von Brandenstein (1901–1989)
15	Hermann Gmeiner (1919–1986)	Austria	"for his work with SOS Children's Villages, and helping parentless children."	Erik Blumenfeld (1915–1997)
15	Hermann Gmeiner (1919–1986)	Austria	"for his work with the SOS Children's Villages, and providing a solution to one of the most painful post-war problems."	5 members of the German Bundestag
15	Hermann Gmeiner (1919–1986)	Austria	"for founding SOS Children's Villages and the work he has done for homeless children and for the cause of peace and humanity throughout the world."	Roderick Joseph O'Hanlon (1923–2002)
15	Hermann Gmeiner (1919–1986)	Austria	"for founding SOS Children's Villages, wherein care for and education of homeless orphans obliterate racial and cultural barriers, making them useful members of our future society."	Guadalupe Forés-Ganzon (1908–1985)
15	Hermann Gmeiner (1919–1986)	Austria	"for his work with the SOS Children's Villages and supporting solidarity across borders and religions."	Georg von Rauch (1947–1971)
15	Hermann Gmeiner (1919–1986)	Austria	"for the character of his vision, devotion and his accomplishments"	William McCurdy (1947–2021)
15	Hermann Gmeiner (1919–1986)	Austria	"for founding SOS Children's Villages and his perseverance in spreading the idea globally, creating homes for the most desolate."	Alfons Gorbach (1898–1972)
16	Jess Gorkin (1913–1985)	United States	"for proposing and campaigning for the direct telephone connection (The Hot Line) between Washington and Moscow which was established in 1963."	Stuart Symington (1901–1988)
17	Boris Gourevitch (1889–1964)	France; United States	"for his work The Road to Peace and Moral Democracy (1955) and for his thirty years of untiring fight for international peace and the rights of minorities."	Robert Morrison MacIver (1890–1964)
18	Guido Guida (1897–1969)	Italy	"for founding the Centro Internazionale Radio-Medico, an organization that offers medical advice to all seaborne vessels that need it, promoting the idea that humanity is without borders."	4 members of the Italian Parliament
19	Haile Selassie (1892–1975)	Ethiopia	"for his significant role in the settlement of the Algerian-Moroccan border conflict in 1963 and his work for uniting the African states."	Georg Schwarzenberger (1908–1991)
19	Haile Selassie (1892–1975)	Ethiopia	"for his significant role in the settlement of the Algerian-Moroccan border conflict in 1963 and his work for uniting the African states."	Jan Szuldszynski (1903–1986)
19	Haile Selassie (1892–1975)	Ethiopia	"for his significant role in the settlement of the Algerian-Moroccan border conflict in 1963 and his work for uniting the African states."	James C. N. Paul (1926–2011)
19	Haile Selassie (1892–1975)	Ethiopia	"for his significant role in the settlement of the Algerian-Moroccan border conflict in 1963 and his work for uniting the African states."	Jean Graven (1899–1987)
19	Haile Selassie (1892–1975)	Ethiopia	"for his significant role in the settlement of the Algerian-Moroccan border conflict in 1963 and his work for uniting the African states."	Asserate Dedjatzmatch (?)
19	Haile Selassie (1892–1975)	Ethiopia	"for his impressive contribution to uniting the African states, and championing the universally accepted principles of law and international politics."	John H. Spencer (1907–2005)
19	Haile Selassie (1892–1975)	Ethiopia	"for his role in securing peace in Africa and especially his role in the conflict between Algeria and Morocco."	3 professors from the University of Lund
19	Haile Selassie (1892–1975)	Ethiopia	"for his work for uniting the African states, and keeping the peace in Africa."	Georges Vedel (1910–2002)
20	Josef Hromádka (1889–1969)	Czechoslovakia	"for his efforts in the ecumenical movement, and working for peace and understanding between people"	3 members of the Czechoslovak Parliament
21	Lyndon B. Johnson (1908–1973)	United States	"for his devotion to world sympathy and understanding, and for steering American foreign policy towards peaceful channels with an adherence to international cooperation."	Frank Vandiver (1925–2005)
22	Marc Joux (?)	France	"for his long and patient missionary work in the apostolic tradition"	Auguste Billiemaz (1903–1983)
23	Woodland Kahler (1895–1981)	United States	"for his work as President of the International Vegetarian Union, whose work encourage fraternization across borders and species."	Mateu Molleví Ribera (1917–2009)
24	Martin Luther King Jr. (1929–1968)	United States	"for his work and witness which promotes the dignity and worth of the human person"	Colin Bell (1903–1988)
24	Martin Luther King Jr. (1929–1968)	United States	"for his efforts in a nonviolence campaign in favor of the civil rights of blacks in the United States."	8 members of the Swedish Parliament
25	Trygvie Lie (1896–1968)	Norway	"for his great contributions to many peaceful solutions in international conflicts, and as former Secretary-General of the United Nations, he has been a great promoter of international peace."	4 members of the Norwegian Storting
26	Maharishi Mahesh Yogi (1918–2008)	India	"for founding the Spiritual Regeneration Movement, and through his meditation method which has brought peace to hundreds of thousands of people."	S. P. Sangar (?)
26	Maharishi Mahesh Yogi (1918–2008)	India	"for founding the Spiritual Regeneration Movement, and for promoting the peace of the individual."	P. Muthiah (?)
27	Adolfo Lopez Mateos (1909–1969)	Mexico	"for leading the way towards world peace through his declaration of Mexico as a non nuclear zone."	Isidro Fabela (1882–1964)
28	Mohammad Reza Pahlavi (1919–1980)	Iran	"for introducing important social reforms in Iran that helped secure peace in the Middle East, and negotiating in a conflict between Pakistan and Afghanistan from 1961 to 1963."	Ahmed Martine-Daftary (?)
29	Joseph Needham (1900–1995)	United States	"for his efforts to tear down ancient barriers which divide mankind, especially those between China and the west, and for main work Science and Civilisation in China (1954–present)."	Lynn T. White Jr. (1907–1987)
30	Paul-Henri Spaak (1899–1972)	Belgium	" for advocating with eloquence and conviction for a close union of the European countries, highlighting the community of culture that exists."	Maurice Leroy (1909–1990)
31	Luigi Spinelli (?) (prob. Altiero Spinelli (1907–1986))	Italy	"for having written Pace universale e governo dei popoli."	Roberto Cantalupo (1891–1975)
32	Clarence Streit (1896–1986)	United States	No reason given for nomination.	Norman Angell (1872–1967)
32	Clarence Streit (1896–1986)	United States	"for working ardently for The Atlantic Union, and for the general growing together of the nations of the Atlantic free world."	William L. Langer (1896–1977)
32	Clarence Streit (1896–1986)	United States	"for working towards the unification of Western Europe and North America, and labouring to deepen our understanding of the interdependence of nations and the dangers of nationalism."	J. William Fulbright (1905–1995)
32	Clarence Streit (1896–1986)	United States	"for writing the book Union Now (1939) and founding the organization Federal Union, and promoting the idea of a federal union of democracies."	Paul Findley (1921–2019)
32	Clarence Streit (1896–1986)	United States	"for founding the International Movement for Atlantic Union, and devoting his life and total energies to the peaceful union of the free countries of the western world."	Clement J. Zablocki (1912–1983)
33	Norman Thomas (1884–1968)	United States	"for devoting his life to the cause of peace and disarmament"	Mulford Q. Sibley (1912–1989)
33	Norman Thomas (1884–1968)	United States	"for being the principal leader and spokesperson of the peace movement in the United States."	Hugh Gregg Cleland (1922–1994)
33	Norman Thomas (1884–1968)	United States	"for his active efforts for world peace since World War I, and forming the organization Turn to Peace."	Seymour M. Lipset (1922–2006)
33	Norman Thomas (1884–1968)	United States	"for his effort to achieve the test ban treaty and universal disarmament, and his wholehearted dedication to the cause of peace"	John Pearson Roche (1923–1994)
34	Hans Thirring (1888–1976)	Austria	"for his work in the international peace movement and his fight against the mis-indoctrination of youth through the educational system as well as his involvement in UNESCO and the Pugwash conferences."	Bruno Pittermann (1905–1983)
35	William Tubman (1895–1971)	Liberia	"for his efforts in favor of the independence movement in Africa and his work to ensure democratic conditions in the new states."	Roland V. Libona (?)
36	Abraham Vereide (1886–1969)	United States	No motivation given for nomination.	Frank Carlson (1893–1987)
Organizations
37	International Commission of Jurists (ICJ) (founded in 1952)	Geneva	No motivation given for nomination.	Edvard Hambro (1911–1977)
38	Norwegian Missionary Society (formed in 1842)	Stavanger	"for advancing the idea of peace in the world through Christianity."	Knut Robberstad (1899–1981)
39	Oxford Committee for Famine Relief (Oxfam) (founded in 1942)	Oxford	"for their work as a relief organization, sending aid regardless of race, religion and politics to people in need"	3 members of the British House of Commons
40	Pugwash Continuing Committee (founded in 1957)	Rome	"for their effort solve the problems created by the existence of nuclear weapons"	Finn Gustavsen (1926–2005)
41	The Rockefeller Foundation (founded in 1913)	New York City	"for efforts to strengthening development countries through applied microbiology, one example being the agricultural program in Mexico."	Hugo Osvald (1892–1970)
42	United Nations Children's Fund (UNICEF) (founded in 1946)	New York City	"for their work to bring aid to children to improve their health conditions, with focus on developing countries and war zones"	Gudmund Harlem (1917–1988)
42	United Nations Children's Fund (UNICEF) (founded in 1946)	New York City	"for its upbuilding and positive charity work that encourages fraternity and understanding between nations"	Berte Rognerud (1907–1997)
42	United Nations Children's Fund (UNICEF) (founded in 1946)	New York City	"for the constructive work of this organisation for the welfare of children, and its contribution to the principle of solidarity and peace"	2 members of the Yugoslav Parliament
43	Universal Esperanto Association (UEA) (founded in 1908)	Rotterdam	"for their admirable work for international brotherhood and world peace"	18 members of the Swedish Parliament
43	Universal Esperanto Association (UEA) (founded in 1908)	Rotterdam	"for their admirable work for international brotherhood and world peace"	Kjell Bondevik (1901–1983)
43	Universal Esperanto Association (UEA) (founded in 1908)	Rotterdam	"for supporting and enhancing understanding between people and world peace"	Aase Bjerkholt (1915–2012)
44	World Veterans Federation (WVF) (founded in 1876)	Geneva	"for its disarmament endeavors and its work with the United Nations, bringing together former enemies for peace."	Vittorio Badini Confalonieri (1914–1993)
44	World Veterans Federation (WVF) (founded in 1876)	Geneva	"for its efforts in making the ideology of peaceful cooperation a reality and supporting the economic and social development in the developing countries"	Maya Devi Chettry (1921–1994)

== Reactions ==
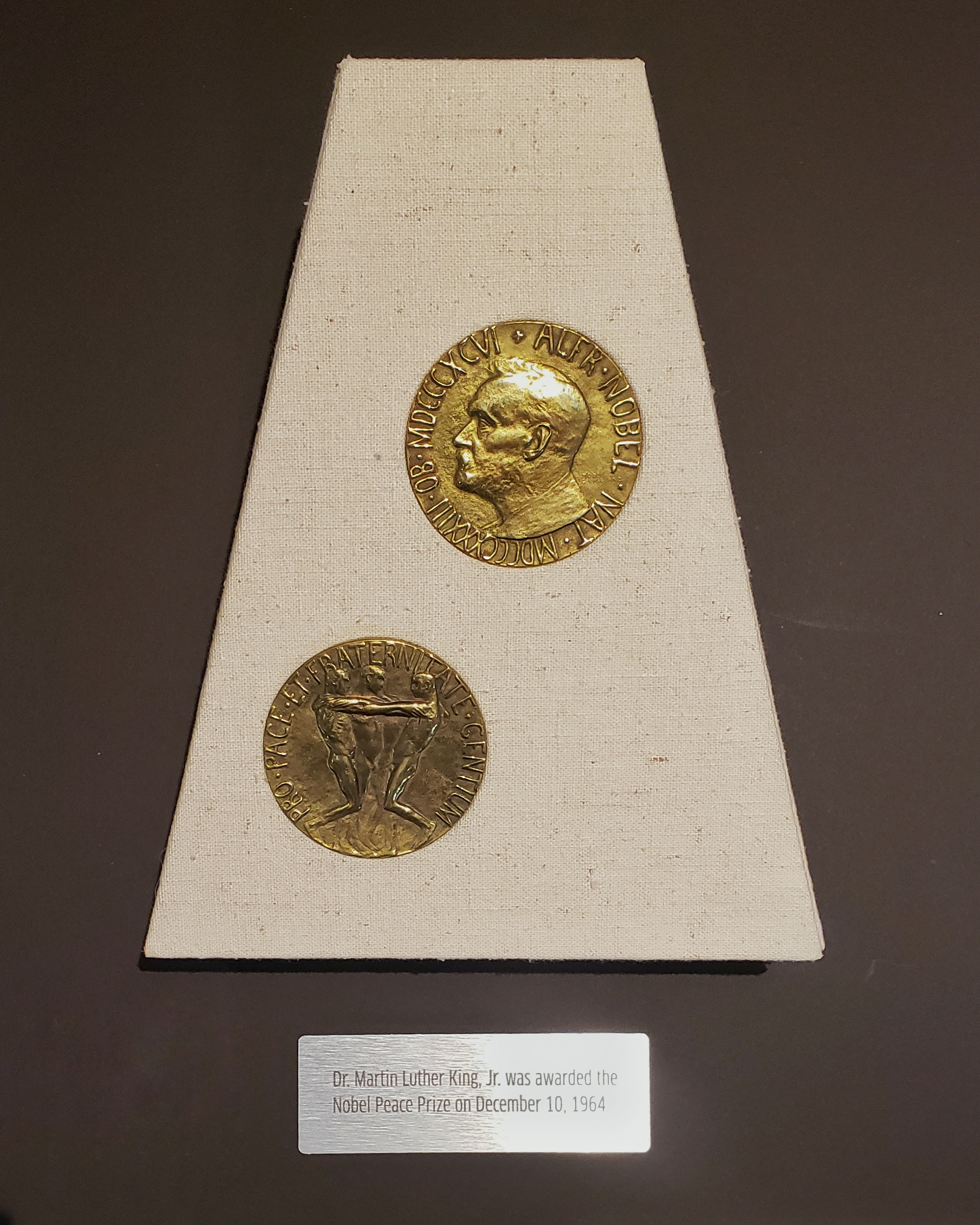
King's prize medal displayed at the Martin Luther King Jr. National Historical Park, Atlanta, United States.

Martin Luther King received the news of his Nobel recognition while he was undergoing a medical checkup at St. Joseph's Hospital in Tampa, Florida. Interviewed by news correspondents of The New York Times, he said:

"I was deeply gratified to hear the news that I had been chosen for this most significant award and I will certainly receive it with great humility and profound appreciation... I am glad people of other nations are concerned with our problems here... I do not consider this merely an honor to me personally but a tribute to the disciplined, wise restraint and majestic courage of gallant Negro and white persons of goodwill who have followed a nonviolent course in seeking to establish a reign of justice and a rule of love across this nation of ours."

Dr. King shared that he would use the prize money to advance the civil rights movement. The United States-Ambassador Margaret Joy Tibbetts reacted, saying: "As an American and representative of the American people, I want to express joy and gratitude that one of my fellow countrymen has been awarded this prize." His wife, Coretta, confessed: "For many years we have had to contend with the other side. For something like this to happen makes it all worthwhile."

== Norwegian Nobel Committee ==
The following members of the Norwegian Nobel Committee appointed by the Storting were responsible for the selection of the 1964 Nobel laureate in accordance with the will of Alfred Nobel:

1964 Norwegian Nobel Committee
Picture	Name	Position	Political Party	Other posts
	Gunnar Jahn (1883–1971)	Chairman	Liberal	former Governor, Norges Bank (1946–1954) former, Minister of Finance (1934–35, 1945)
	Gustav Natvig-Pedersen (1893–1965)	Member	Labour	former President of the Storting (1949–1954)
	Aase Lionæs (1907–1999)	Member	Labour	Vice President of the Lagting (1965–1973)
	Nils Langhelle (1907–1967)	Member	Labour	former Minister of Defence (1952–1954); President of the Storting (1958–1965)
	John Lyng (1905–1978)	Member	Conservative	24th Prime Minister of Norway (1963)
