= François de Roux =

François de Roux (7 March 1897 – 17 July 1954) was a French writer, winner of the 1935 Prix Renaudot.

== Life ==
Born in Aix-en-Provence, de Roux married Odette Magne.

A friend of Jean Paulhan and Paul Valéry, he began his literary career in 1924 at the age of 27. From 1924 to 1935, he contributed to La Nouvelle Revue française with articles on Jacques Rivière, Jacques de Lacretelle, Colette, etc.

In 1935 he published Jours sans gloire at Éditions Gallimard for which he obtained the Prix Renaudot on 5 December 1935. On 15 December 1935, at a dinner at Drouant's house gathering the ten winners of the Renaudot Prize since 1926 (Charles Braibant, Philippe Hériat, Louis-Ferdinand Céline...), de Roux put forward the idea of publishing a collection of ten short stories by the winners, presented by each of the jurors. It was adopted. The volume was published in the following year. For Brune, it narrowly missed the 1938 Prix Goncourt, defeated in the fifth round by L'Araigne by Henri Troyat thanks to the double vote of the president of the jury, J.-H. Rosny aîné.

The Éditions Robert Laffont succeeded in attracting François de Roux with Amours perdues in 1942 and L'Ombrageuse (in 1942 too).

De Roux died in Paris at age 57.

== Work ==
- 1935: Jours sans gloire — Prix Renaudot
- 1938: Bru: Amours perdues
- 1945: L'Ombrageuse
- 1950: Les Absentes
- 1952: La Jeunesse de Lyautey
