= Antoine Westermann =

French chef (born 1946)

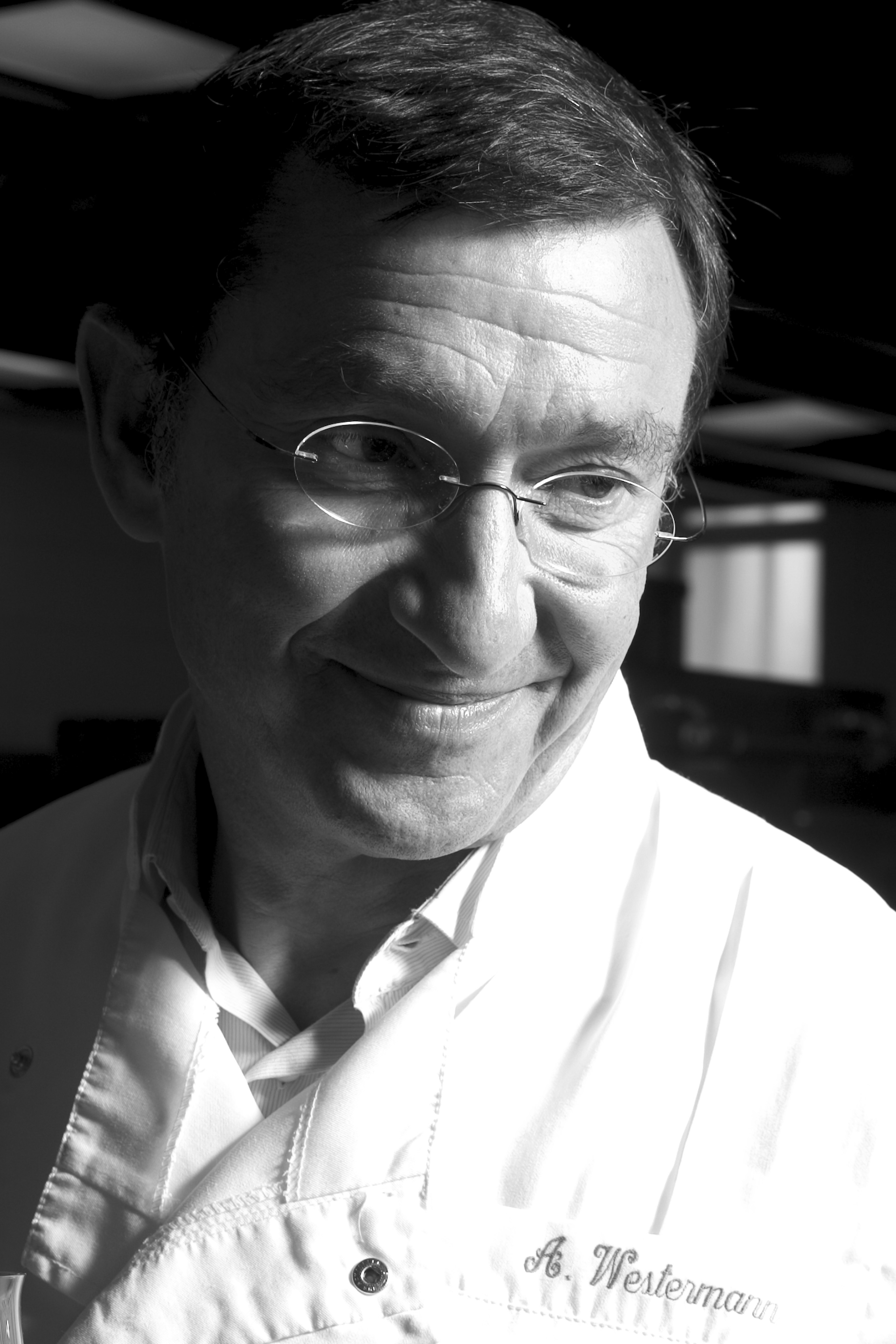
- Chef Antoine Westermann
- Born: 4 April 1946 (age 80); Alsace, France
- Education: Culinary school in Strasbourg, France
- Culinary career
- Cooking style: French cuisine
- Rating: Michelin stars
- Current restaurant(s): Le Coq Rico, New York City Drouant by Antoine Westermann, Paris Mon Vieil Ami, Paris Le Coq Rico, Paris La Dégustation, Paris
- Award(s) won: • 1994 : Three stars Michelin Guide 19/20 au Gault et Millau • 1983 : 2 stars Michelin Guide • 1975 : 1-star Michelin Guide

Antoine Westermann (4 April 1946, Wissembourg, Alsace, France) is a French chef.

He held 3 Michelin Guide stars for his Strasbourg restaurant Le Buerehiesel and maintained a star rating at the restaurant for over 31 years until 2007, when he asked the Michelin Guide to remove them.

== Biography ==
=== Early life ===
Antoine Westermann decided to become a chef at age 8, encouraged by his father. He studied at L'Ecole Hôteliere in Strasbourg while apprenticing at the nearby Buffet de la Gare.

In 1969, after Westermann earned his professional diploma, his father took out a mortgage on their home to purchase a farmhouse in the middle of Strasbourg's Parc de l'Orangerie for Westermann, then at 23, turned it into a restaurant. That spot became Le Buerehiesel, the Alsatian dialect meaning for "little farmhouse".

=== 1969–2007: Le Buerehiesel ===
Westermann remained head chef and proprietor of Le Buerehiesel for 38 years. The restaurant earned its first Michelin star in 1975, followed by a second star in 1983.

=== 1994 ===
In 1994, 25 years after its opening, Le Buerehiesel was awarded both a 3-star Michelin ranking and a 19/20 rating in the "Gault & Millau Guide" while Westermann was named one of France's top chefs along with Joël Robuchon, Michel Bras, Guy Savoy and Alain Ducasse.

=== 1998–2006: Other Endeavors ===
From 1998 to 2006 Westermann worked at Fortaleza do Guincho in Cascais, Portugal, alongside executive chef Vincent Farges. The restaurant has retained one Michelin star since 2001.

=== 2007 ===
In 2007, Westermann gave up his 3 stars to turn to new culinary adventures. His son, Eric Westermann took over Le Buerehiesel and won 1 Michelin star in 2008.

=== 2003–2017: Mon Vieil Ami ===
In homage to his mother's cuisine, Westermann opened the vegetable-centric bistro Mon Vieil Ami (meaning "My Old Friend") in 2003. The restaurant became the first table d'hôte in Paris, an otherwise traditional Alsatian format that ran until its closing in 2017.

=== 2006–2018: Drouant ===
In 2006, Westermann worked at Drouant, where the Goncourt and Renaudot prizes have taken place since 1914. Westermann sold Drouant to restaurateurs Gardinier & Fils in 2018.

=== 2012: Le Coq Rico ===
Westermann hopes to expand the market for ethically labeled meat production throughout France and the United States.

He created the brand and the first concept of a mono-maniac bistro around poultry, Le Coq Rico, in Paris. The restaurant is recognized as the best roasted chicken in Paris by several food critics.

In September 2021, Le Coq Rico became Le Coq & Fils – The Poultry House

=== 2016–2018 ===
He later developed his savoir-faire in New York and branded Le Coq Rico in financial association with Francis Staub. It received 2 stars from The New York Times and Best Roasted Poultry from NYC.

In August 2018, he was fired from office by his partner. He works with farmers on the development of old breeds, such as the red turkey of the Ardennes, the Landes poultry, the poultry of Contre, the Naked Neck of Forez, La Flèche.

He conducts the "Le tour de France des belles volailles" – a monthly event with an old breed in addition to the menu. He is the ambassador of the Live Stock Conservancy, an organization that manages the reintroduction and enhancement of ancient American breeds.

== Restaurants ==
=== France ===
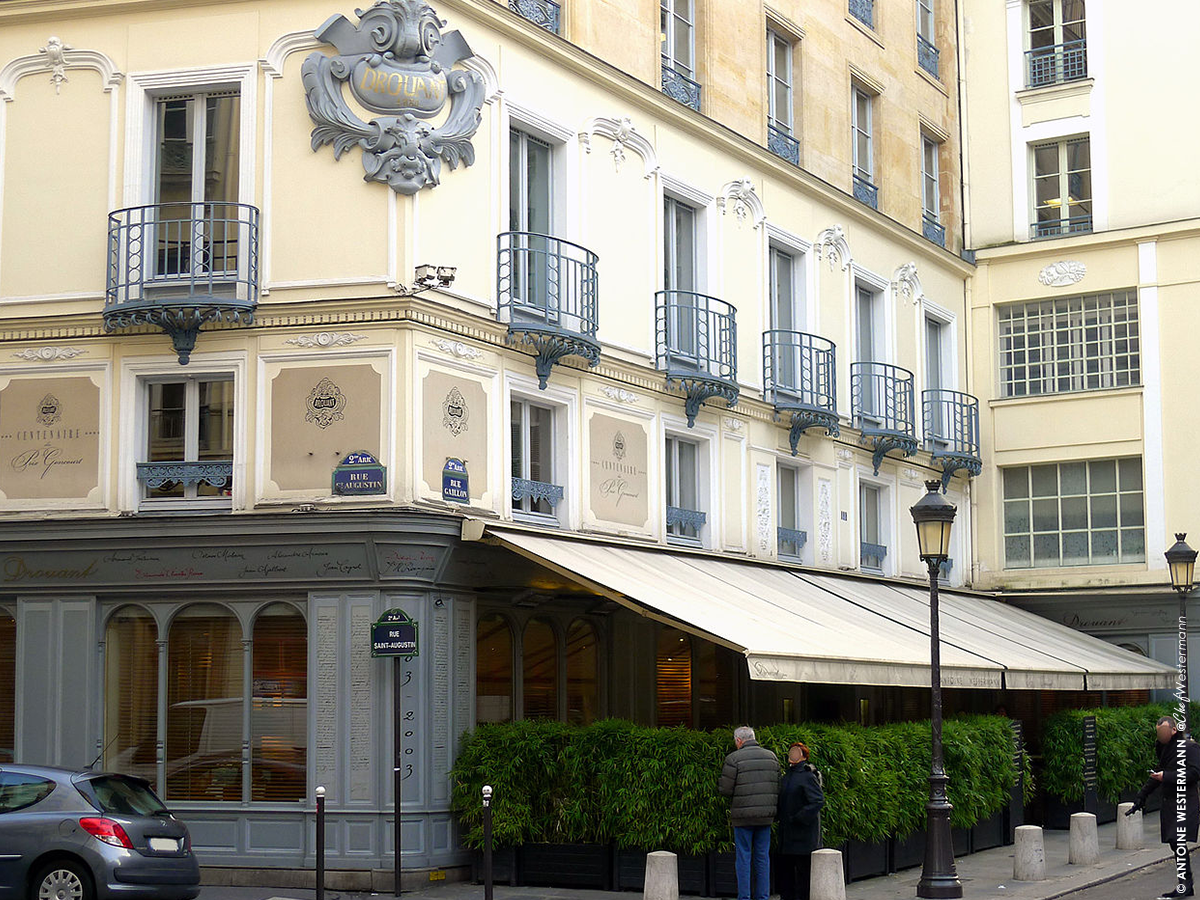
Drouant by Antoine Westermann in Paris - France

- 1969–2007: Le Buerehiesel – 3 stars Michelin Guide in Strasbourg
- 2003–2016: Mon Vieil Ami in Paris
- 2006–2018: Drouant by Antoine Westermann in Paris
- 2012 – Today: Le Coq & Fils, The Poultry House – formerly Le Coq Rico
- 2013–2017: La Dégustation in Paris – an ode to the art of French appetizing in the Montmartre neighbourhood of Paris.

=== United States ===
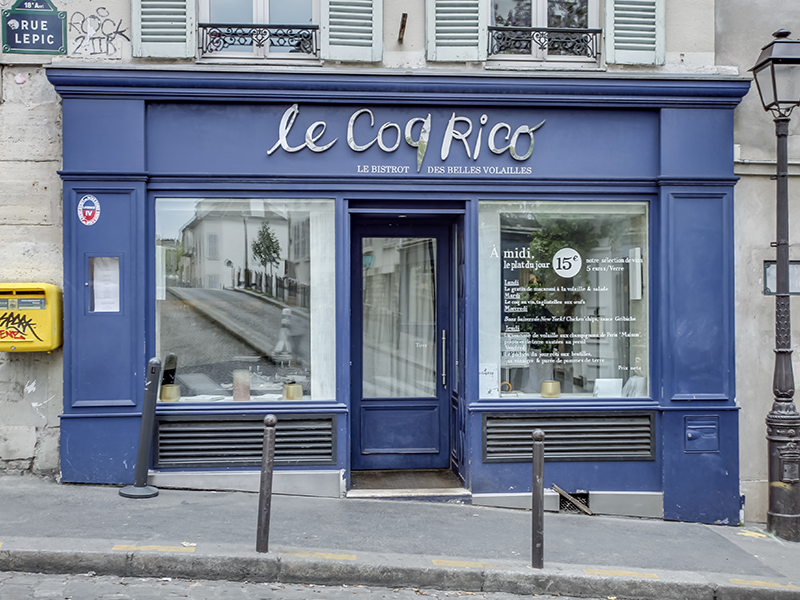
Le Coq Rico in Paris (Montmartre)

- 2002–2005: Restaurant Café 15 at the Sofitel Lafayette Square Hotel in Washington, D.C.
- 2006–2013: Le Café du Parc – Pennsylvania Avenue in Washington, D.C.
- 2016–2018: Le Coq Rico – New York

=== Portugal ===
- 1999–2016: Fortaleza do Guincho in Cascais
- 2007–2012: Uva Restaurant at The Vine Hotel in Funchal

== Cooking style ==
Westermann's cooking style focuses on reinventing traditional Alsatian recipes to create signature dishes such as "Beer Brioche", "Oyster Soup", and "Pâté en Croûte." Outside of Alsace, Westermann's style is heavily influenced by the Mediterranean cuisine of South-Eastern France. Westermann is a proponent of the ethical sourcing of meat.

The menu at Le Coq Rico has multiple breeds of chicken, rooster, guinea fowl, and duck.

Chef Westermann claims to want to reintroduce ancient poultry breeds and cook poultry in French, European, and American regions.

=== Recipes ===
- Young Hen in a Baeckeoffe
- Recipe of Young Fatted Hen Terrine with Fennel & Foie Gras
- Recipe of Frog's Legs with Schniederspaetle
- Daube of Warm Vegetables with a Salad of White Haricots with Aged Vinegar
- Beer Brioche

== Books ==
- Le Coq Rico, La Cuisine des Belles Volailles by Antoine Westermann, photos by Marie-Pierre Morel, illustrations by Shane & Christophe Meyer - Editions Marabout, 2013 ISBN 978-2-501-08204-4
- La Cuisine de Monsieur Momo by Maurice Joyant and Henri de Toulouse-Lautrec, recipes of Antoine Westermann - Editions Menu Fretin, 2011 ISBN 978-2-9170-0833-1
- Cuisine-moi des Étoiles by Jean Orizet and Antoine Westermann - Editions Le Cherche midi, 2009 ISBN 978-2-7491-1070-7
- La Cuisine Ménagère d'un Grand Chef by Antoine Westermann - Editions Minerva, 1999 ISBN 2830705394
- L'Alsace des Saveurs Retrouvées by Antoine Westermann - Editions Albin Michel, 1998 ISBN 2-226-08792-3

Chefs books

Burger de Chefs by Thérèse Rocher photos by Delphine Amar-Constantini - Éditions Larousse pages 192 to 194: Poultry Burger and Strass'Burger, 2014 ISBN 978-2-03-590461-4

- Le Nouvel Art Culinaire Français - Editions Flammarion, 2012 ISBN 978-2-08-127251-4
- Les 100 Mots de la Gastronomie by Alain Bauer & Laurent Plantier - Editions Que sais-je?, 2010 ISBN 978-2-13-058504-6
- Trois Étoiles au Michelin: Une Histoire de la Haute Gastronomie Française et Européenne by Jean-François Mesplède, preface by Alain Ducasse - Editions Gründ, 2004 ISBN 2700024680
- La Haute Cuisine Française, les Recettes Emblématiques des Grands Chefs du Monde by Nicolas de Rabaudy, preface by Antoine Westermann, illustrations of Sandrine Courau and Reno Marca - Editions Minerva, 2001 ISBN 2830705408
