= Georges Govy =

Georges Govy (1913 in Yevpatoria, Crimea – 18 January 1975 in Paris) was a French writer, journalist, and winner of the 1955 Prix Renaudot.

== Life ==
His father was a famous painter, died during the Russian Revolution. He was a seaman, and settled in Paris. He was a foreign correspondent during the Spanish Civil War, and became friends with André Malraux. He was a volunteer during World War II. In 1942, he joined the Mouvement de la jeunesse sioniste MJS (Zionist youth movement), in Grenoble, led by Toto Giniewski.

== Works ==
- Sang russe Ed. du Seuil, 1946, OCLC 490044370
- Le Moissonneur d'épines, La Table ronde. 1955 OCLC 59766686, Prix Renaudot.
- Sang d'Espagne, A. Fayard, 1958, OCLC 419948108
  - Madonna ohne Wunder : Erzählungen Berlin : Verl. Volk u. Welt, 1963, OCLC 250864723
- Les jours maigres Ed. du Seuil, OCLC 369693724
