= Guillaume Le Touze =

French writer (born 1968)

Guillaume Le Touze (born 24 March 1968 Le Havre) is a French writer.

== Biography ==
After holding various jobs, he was recruited as a designer for the publishing house L'Ecole des Loisirs, which published his first children's book in 1991. His first novel for adults followed in 1992.

He received the 1994 Prix Renaudot, for Comme ton père.

== Works ==
- Comme tu as changé, éditions de l'Olivier, 1992; Actes Sud, 2009, ISBN 978-2-7427-7971-0
- Comme ton père, éditions de l'Olivier, 1994; Éditions de l'Olivier, 1995, ISBN 978-2-02-025772-5
- Etonne-moi, éditions de l'Olivier, 1997, ISBN 978-2-87929-123-9
- Dis-moi quelque chose, Actes Sud, 1999, ISBN 978-2-7427-2025-5
- Tu rêves encore, Actes Sud, 2001, ISBN 978-2-7427-3402-3
- Attraction, Actes Sud, 2005, ISBN 978-2-7427-5281-2

== Children's works ==
- J'entends le silence des chaussures de Papa, L'Ecole des Loisirs, 1991
- Leopold préfère les fauves, L'Ecole des Loisirs, 1992
- Dommage que ce soit un secret, L'Ecole des Loisirs, 1994
- Les crocodiles ne pleurent plus, L'Ecole des Loisirs, 1995
- L'important c'est d'y croire, L'Ecole des Loisirs, 1995
- A cause de la cheminée, L'Ecole des Loisirs, 1996
- On m'a oublié, L'Ecole des Loisirs, 1996
- Seule au monde, Gallimard Jeunesse, 1998
- Les nuits de Léo, Ed.Actes Sud junior, 2006, ISBN 978-2-7427-6339-9
- Les ogres pupuces, Actes Sud-Papiers, 2008, ISBN 978-2-7427-7173-8

== Filmography ==
He worked on the script of Nés en 68 (2008), a film by Olivier Ducastel and Jacques Martineau.
