= Bernard Nabonne =

French writer

Bernard Nabonne (1897-1951) was a French writer of Bearnaise origin. He is best known for his novels written in the 1920s, for example, La Butte aux Cailles (1925) and Maitena (1927). The latter won the Prix Renaudot. Other notable works include Joseph Bonaparte (1950 Prix Thérouanne), À la Gasconne (1935 Prix Paul Flat), and À l'abandon (1932 Prix Montyon).

Besides fiction, he also wrote a number of books on French history.
