= Roger Bordier =

French writer (1923–2015)

- Born: 5 March 1923; Blois
- Died: June 2015 (aged 91–92)
- Occupation: Writer

Roger Bordier (5 March 1923 – June 2015) was a French writer, winner of the 1961 Prix Renaudot.

== Biography ==
Bordier was born in Blois. He began working as a journalist in Blois and Paris. He then became an art critic for Art today. He published his first collection of poems in Seghers. He penned short stories. His first novel was The Fifth Season, published by Calmann-Levy. His third novel, The Corn, won the Prix Renaudot in 1961. He then published A Golden Age, which was adapted for television by Fernand Marzelle and continued publishing essays on criticism.

Roger Bordier was a professor at the École nationale supérieure des arts décoratifs, where he taught history of modern art and sociology of contemporary aesthetics.

== Works ==
- Le Mime, Paris, Éditions Calmann-Lévy, 1960, 280 p.
- Les Blés, Paris, Éditions Calmann-Lévy, 1961, 283 p. Prix Renaudot 1961
- Le Chauffage à eau chaude sous pression d'azote, Auxerre, France, Impr. Tridon-Gallot, 1964, 173 p.
- Le Tour de ville, Paris, Albin Michel, 1969, 285 p.
- Les Éventails, Paris, Le Seuil, 1971, 224 p.
- L'Objet contre l'Art, toute l'histoire de l'art moderne est celle des vicissitudes de l'objet, Paris, Éditions Hachette, 1972, 205 p.
- Meeting, Paris, Albin Michel, 1976; 1998, 304 p. (ISBN 9782226002686)
- Demain l'été, Paris, Albin Michel, 1977, 318 p. (ISBN 9782226004994)
- L'Art moderne et l'Objet, Paris, Albin Michel, 1978 (réimpr. 1998), 282 p. (ISBN 9782226006509)
- La Grande Vie, Paris, Albin Michel, 1981; 2000, 550 p. (ISBN 9782226010704)
- Les Temps heureux, Paris, Albin Michel, 1984, 452 p. (ISBN 9782226020215)
- Longue file, Paris, Éditions Temps actuels, 1984 (ISBN 978-2209056248)
- La Belle de Mai, Paris, Albin Michel, 1987, 342 p. (ISBN 9782226028495)
- Les Saltimbanques de la révolution ou Gracchus Babeuf raconte aux citoyens, Pantin, France, Le Temps des cerises, 1989, 130 p. (ISBN 978-2209061181)
- Vel d'hiv, Paris, Albin Michel, 1989, 304 p. (ISBN 9782226036308)
- Les Fusils du premier mai ou la chronique de Fourmies, Paris, Éditions La Dispute, 1991, 127 p. (ISBN 978-2-209-06558-5)
- Chroniques de la cité joyeuse, Paris, Albin Michel, 1995, 288 p. (ISBN 9782226076304)
- Chère bourgeoisie, Paris, Éditions Temps actuels, 1996, 132 p. (ISBN 978-2209064427)
- 36, la fête, Paris, Éditions Temps actuels, 1996, 127 p. (ISBN 978-2209057481)
- J’étais enfant en 36, Pantin, France, Le Temps des cerises, 1996, 123 p. (ISBN 978-2841090587)
- L’Interrogatoire, Pantin, France, Le Temps des cerises, 1998, 46 p. (ISBN 978-2841091232)
- L'Ordre et autres désordres, Pantin, France, Le Temps des cerises, 2000, 207 p. (ISBN 978-2841092390)
- L'Océan, Paris, Albin Michel, 2000
- Le Zouave du pont de l'Alma, Paris, Albin Michel, 2001, 272 p. (ISBN 9782226125743)
- Éloges vagabonds, Pantin, France, Le Temps des cerises, 2002, 64 p. (ISBN 978-2841094073)
- À la recherche de Paris, Pantin, France, Le Temps des cerises, 2004, 147 p. (ISBN 978-2841094929)
- Le 36 des femmes; Le Peuple de 36, Pantin, France, avec Patricia Latour, Le Temps des cerises, 2006, 230 p. (ISBN 978-2841096008)
- Séverine, Pantin, France, Le Temps des cerises, 2008, 250 p. (ISBN 9782841096794)
- Quand triomphait l'art abstrait, Pantin, France, Le Temps des cerises, 2009, 110 p. (ISBN 9782841097784)
- Les Coups du sort, Pantin, France, Le Temps des cerises, 2009, 200 p. (ISBN 978-2841094417)
- L'Ombrelle, Pantin, France, Le Temps des cerises, 2010, 129 p. (ISBN 9782841098200)
