= Philippe Doumenc =

French novelist (1934–2023)

Philippe Doumenc (21 April 1934 – 19 July 2023) was a French novelist. His first novel, Les Comptoirs du Sud won the 1989 Prix Renaudot.

Philippe Doumenc was the grandson of Aimé Doumenc (1880–1948). He died on 19 July 2023, at the age of 89.

== Works ==
- Les Comptoirs du Sud: roman, Paris: Éditions du Seuil, 1989, ISBN 978-2-02-010863-8
- En haut à gauche du paradis: roman, Paris: éditions du Seuil, 1992, ISBN 2-02-016472-8
- Les amants de Tonnegrande: roman, Seuil, 2003, ISBN 978-2-02-058935-2
- Contre-enquête sur la mort d'Emma Bovary, Paris: Actes Sud, 2007, ISBN 978-2-7427-6820-2
- Un tigre dans la soute: nouvelles, Actes sud, 2008, ISBN 978-2-7427-7560-6
