= Pierre Fisson =

French writer

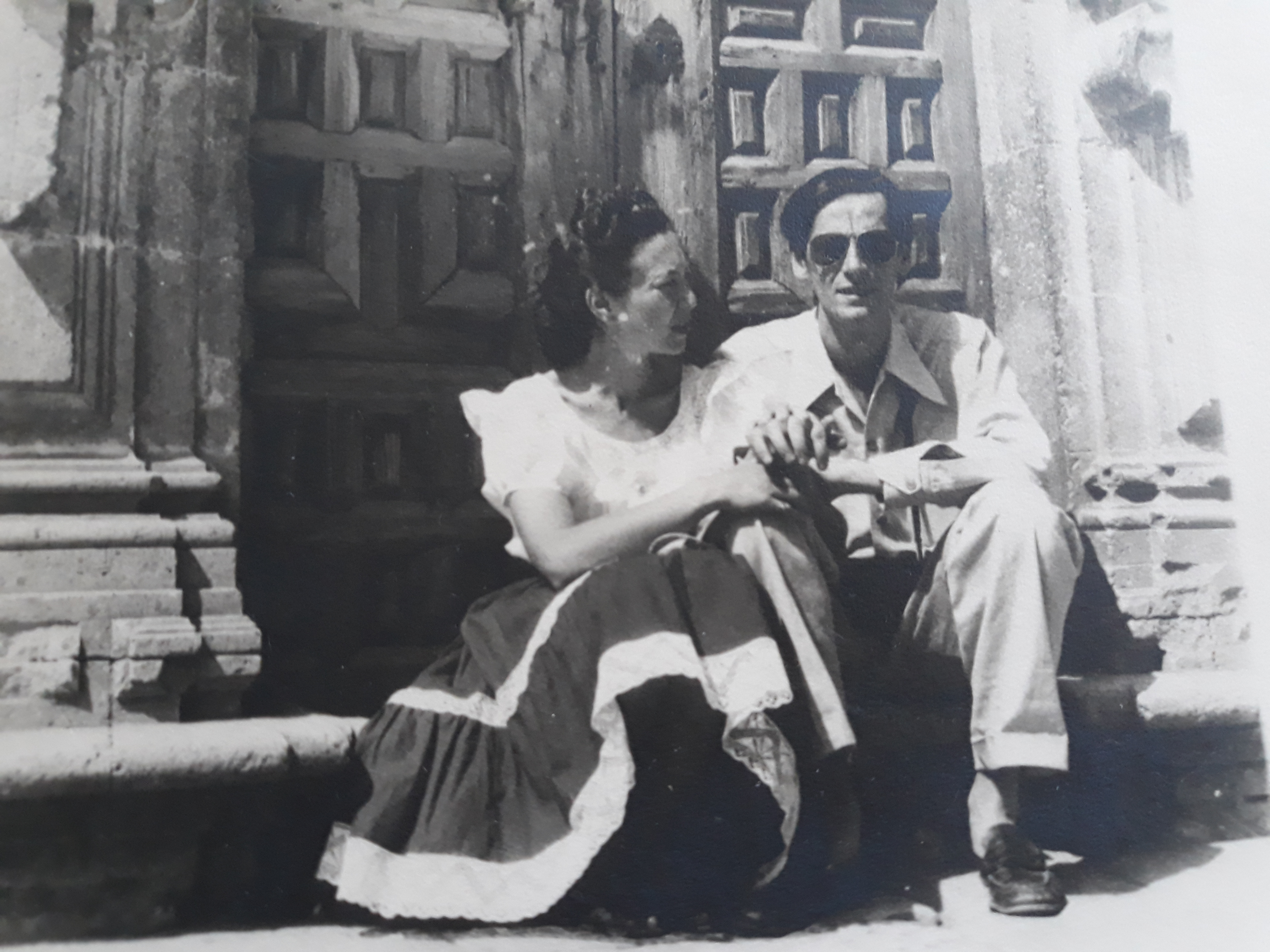
Pierre Fisson and his wife Hélène, during their stay in Mexico in 1951.

Pierre Fisson (1918 in Tbilisi, Georgia – July 2013) was a French writer, laureate of the Prix Renaudot in 1948.

== Life ==
Fisson was born to a French father and a Georgian mother. He made all his studies in Paris. During the Second World War, he was appointed an aspirant in 1939 and took up the maquis in 1942. After the Liberation of France, he worked as an attaché with the American General Staff in Berlin, then became a press attaché in Mexico. He then became a journalist and writer.

He was awarded the prix Renaudot in 1948 for his first novel, Voyage aux horizons.

== Works ==
- 1948: Voyage aux horizons Éditions Julliard – Prix Renaudot
- 1950: Les Certitudes équivoques.
- 1950: Les Princes du tumulte. Éditions Julliard
- 1952: Les Amants de Séoul.
- 1954: Le Mercenaire
- 1958: La Butte aux ronces. Éditions Julliard
- 1961: Si on te prend ta robe. Éditions Julliard
- 1965: Les Rendez-vous de Moscou. Éditions Robert Laffont
- 1967: Les Automobiles : récits des temps actuels. Éditions Robert Laffont
