= Jean Rogissart =

French writer

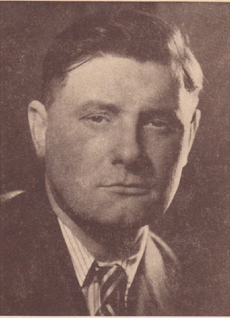
Jean Rogissart (1894–1961)

Jean Rogissart (1894–1961) was a French writer. He hailed from the Ardennes and was a teacher by trade. In 1925, he founded with Jean-Paul Vaillant the Société des Ecrivains Ardennais. The same year, he published his first collection of poems, Intimités, for which he won the honorary prize at the Jeux floraux du Languedoc. He then went on to publish in 1932 his first novel Coline, le meunier du Fays and then in 1934 a collection of poems Aux vert fuseaux de la Semoy et de la Meuse, both illustrated by the watercolour artist and industrialist Émile Faynot. The latter won a regional poetry prize. Rogissart became well known to the public in 1937 when he won the Prix Renaudot for his novel Mervale, and for the publication of the seven volumes constituting the collection Mamert, an Ardennes family saga which received the Prix du roman populiste.
