= Gérard de Cortanze =

French writer, essayist, translator and literary critic (born 1948)

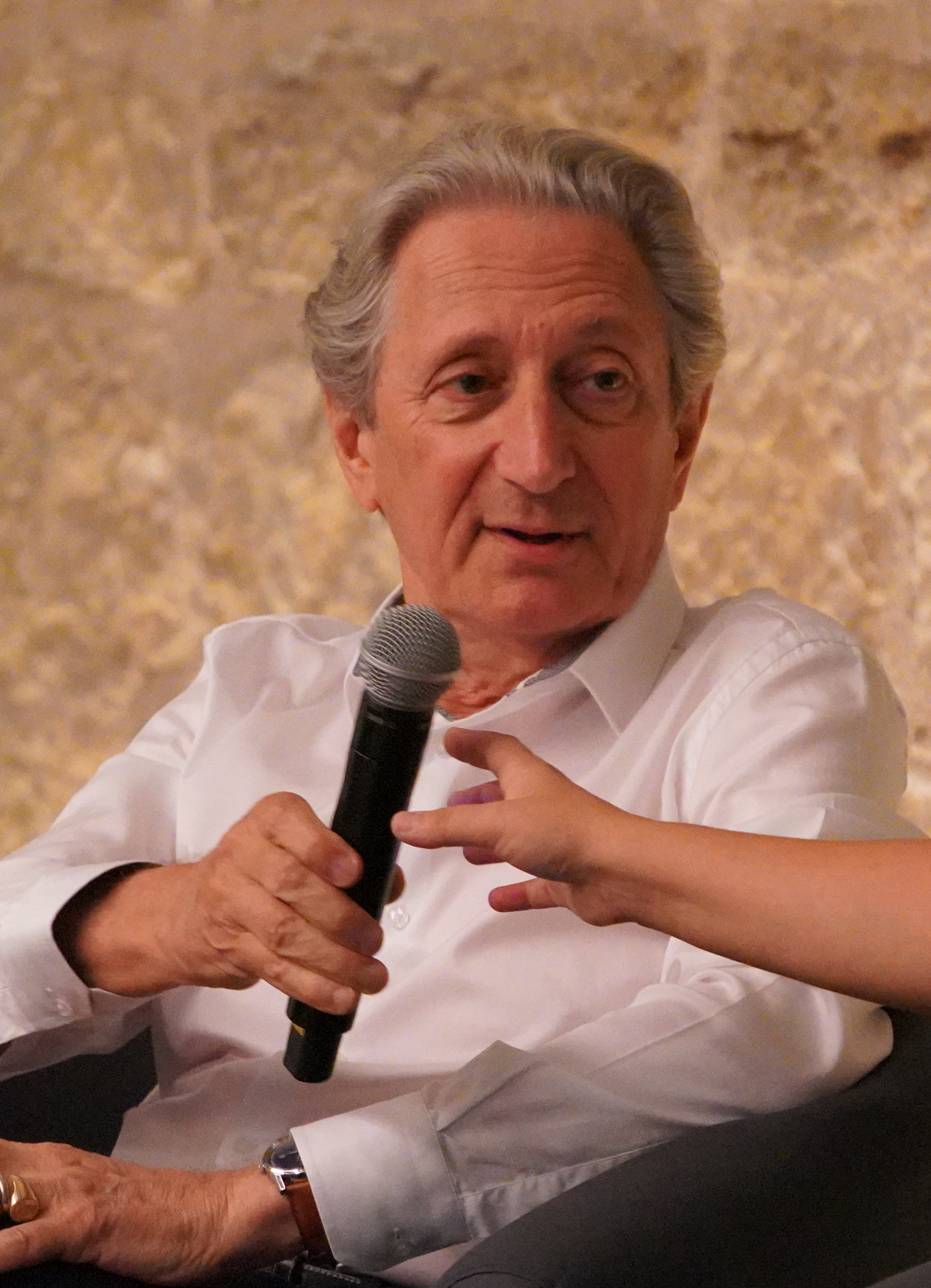
"Le Livre sur la Place", Nancy, 2022

Gérard de Cortanze (born 22 July 1948 in Paris) is a French writer, essayist, translator and literary critic. He won the Prix Renaudot in 2002 for his historical novel Assam. He was made a chevalier of the Legion of Honour in 2009.

== Career ==
He published essays on Paul Auster, J.M.G. Le Clézio, and the history of Surrealism. He collaborated with Le Figaro Magazine, as well as literary writing and is responsible for the Folio Biographies collection launched by Gallimard in 2005.

He translated works of Spanish writers, such as the Mexican Jose Emilio Pacheco, the Nicaraguan Rubén Darío, Argentine exile in France Juan José Saer, the notebooks of the Spanish painter Antonio Saura (1930–1998), and poems, like those of Peruvian poet Cesar Vallejo (1892–1938) and the Chilean Vicente Huidobro (1893–1948).

He is president of the jury prize for the Jean-Monnet Prize for European Literature, awarded annually since 1995, to reward a European writer for a book written or translated into French.

The award-winning Assam tells the story of Aventino Roero Di Cortanze, an Italian aristocrat at the time of the French invasion of Italy. The first section of the story dramatizes his response to the invasion and his involvement in the battle scenes, which are perhaps modelled on those in War and Peace or Red Badge of Courage. The second section describes a trip to south Asia under the influence of a friend who is eager to find a way to develop an Indian tea trade within Italy to compete with the tea trade with China that Britain was developing at this time. In the third section, Aventino returns to occupied Italy and must choose between cooperation with the victorious French, joining the Austrians (themselves traditional enemies of his native Piedmont) and the promotion not only of Italian unity but also an independent resistance movement or in other words an Italian maquis. This story, a French novel in which the French are the aggressors, naturally raises questions about France's own experience of being invaded by a major continental power in the 20th century.

== Works ==
=== Novels ===
- Gérard de Cortanze, René Major, Le livre de la morte, Paris, Aubier-Montaigne, coll. « Écrit Sur Parole », 1980 (reprint 1992), ISBN 978-2-7007-0219-4
- Les enfants s'ennuient le dimanche, Paris, Hachette, 1985, ISBN 978-2-01-011520-2; Arles, Actes Sud, coll. « Babel », 1999, ISBN 978-2-7427-2509-0
- Giuliana, Paris, Belfond, 1986, ISBN 978-2-7144-1927-9; Arles, Actes Sud, coll. « Babel », 1999, ISBN 978-2-7427-1888-7
- Elle demande si c'est encore la nuit, Paris, Belfond, 1988, ISBN 978-2-7144-2136-4; Paris-Monaco, Éditions du Rocher, 1991
- L'amour dans la ville, Paris, Albin Michel, 1993, ISBN 978-2-226-06223-9; Paris, LGF, coll. « Livre de Poche », 1996, ISBN 978-2-253-13990-4
- L'ange de mer, Paris, Flammarion, coll. « Littérature française », 1996, ISBN 978-2-08-067108-0
- Une chambre à Turin, Paris-Monaco, Éditions du Rocher, 2001, ISBN 978-2-268-03973-2; Paris, Gallimard, coll. « Folio », 2002, ISBN 978-2-07-042387-3
- Le cycle des vice-rois
  - Assam, Paris, Albin Michel, 2002, ISBN 978-2-226-13393-9
  - Aventino, Paris, Albin Michel, 2005, ISBN 978-2-226-15523-8
  - Les vice-rois, Arles, Actes Sud, 1998, ISBN 978-2-7427-1847-4; Paris, J'ai lu, coll. « J'ai lu Roman », 2006, ISBN 978-2-290-30002-2
  - Cyclone, Arles, Actes Sud, 2000, ISBN 978-2-7427-2847-3; Paris, J'ai lu, coll. « J'ai lu Roman », 2003, ISBN 978-2-290-32310-6
- Banditi, Paris, Albin Michel, 2003, ISBN 978-2-226-14965-7
- Spaghetti!, Paris, Gallimard, coll. « Haute enfance », 2005, ISBN 978-2-07-077517-0
- Laura, Paris, Plon, 2005, ISBN 978-2-259-20377-7
- Miss monde, Paris, Gallimard, coll. « Haute enfance », 2007, ISBN 978-2-07-078084-6
- Claude Arnaud, Elisabeth Barillé, Gérard de Cortanze, Daniel Maximin, Paris *Portraits, Paris, Gallimard, coll. « Folio », 2007, ISBN 978-2-07-034245-7, « Le géorama Montparnasse »
- De Gaulle en maillot de bain, Paris, Plon, 2007, ISBN 978-2-259-20300-5
- Indigo, Paris, Plon, 2009, ISBN 978-2-259-20301-2
- La belle endormie, Monaco-Paris, Le Serpent à Plumes, 2009, ISBN 978-2-268-06802-2
- Miroirs, Paris, Plon, 2011, ISBN 978-2-259-21196-3
- Les amants de Coyoacan, Paris, 2015, ISBN 978-2-226-31472-7

=== Poetry ===
- Altérations, Éditions d'Atelier, 1973
- Au seuil: La fêlure, PJO, 1974
- U. Cenote, Alain Anseuw éditeur, 1980
- Los Angelitos, Richard Sébastian Imprimeur, 1980
- La Muerte solar, Pre-textos, 1985 (ISBN 9788485081660)
- Jours dans l'échancrure de la nuque, Paris, La Différence, coll. « Littérature », 1988, 219 p. ISBN 978-2-7291-0288-3
- La Porte de Cordoue, Paris, La Différence, coll. « Littérature », 1989, 143 p. ISBN 978-2-7291-0449-8
- Le Mouvement des choses, Paris, La Différence, coll. « Clepsydre », 1999, 189 p. ISBN 978-2-7291-1246-2. Prix SGDL-Charles Vildrac, 1999.

=== Non-fiction ===
- Le monde du surréalisme. Editions Complexe. 2005. ISBN 978-2-8048-0056-7.
