= Célia Bertin =

French writer (1920–2014)

Célia Bertin (French pronunciation: [selja bɛʁtɛ̃]; 22 October 1920 – 27 November 2014) was a French writer, journalist, biographer, French Resistance fighter and winner of the 1953 Prix Renaudot. She was awarded as an Officer of the Legion of Honour, and an Officer of Ordre des Arts et des Lettres.

== Biography ==
After her secondary education at the Lycée Fénelon, she obtained a degree in literature at the Sorbonne. She wrote a thesis on the influence of the Russian novel (Gogol, Turgenev, Dostoevsky, Tolstoy, Chekhov) on the contemporary English novel (Arnold Bennett to Virginia Woolf).

During World War II, she joined the Resistance, and in 1944 she was sent by the Ministry of Information to Switzerland. After the war, she lived in Cagnes-sur-Mer, and Saint-Paul-de-Vence. She published her first novel, The Parade of the wicked, in 1946.

In 1951, she participated in the founding of the literary magazine Roman, with Pierre de Lescure, published in St. Paul de Vence. She moved to Paris in 1953, when she won the Prix Renaudot for The Last Innocence.

She translated articles from English and Italian to French and published numerous articles (in Le Figaro Literature, Arts, and La Revue de Paris).

In 1967, Celia Bertin was invited to be a writer-in-residence at Tufts University in Boston, where she wrote a novel in French titled Je t'appellerai Amérique ["I'll call you, America"] (1972, Editions Grasset). She later married Jerry Reich of New York City and the couple lived in Boston, New Hampshire, Maine and Paris. Jerry Reich, an advertising executive, died in 2010. Bertin died on 27 November 2014, aged 94.

== Works ==
- 1946: La Parade des impies, Paris, Grasset
- 1947: La Bague était brisée, Paris, Corrêa
- 1949: Les Saisons du mélèze, Paris, Corrêa
- 1953: La Dernière innocence, 1953, Prix Renaudot. English translation by Marjorie Deans, The Last Innocence, New York, McGraw-Hill Book Co., 1955
- 1954: Contre-champ: roman, Paris, Plon
- 1957: Une femme heureuse: roman, Paris, Corrêa
- 1958: Le Temps des femmes, Paris, Hachette
- 1963: La Comédienne, Paris, Grasset
- 1967: Mayerling, ou le destin fatal des Wittelsbach, Paris, Perrin ISBN 978-2-262-00108-7
- 1972: Je t'appellerai Amérique, Paris, B. Grasset
- 1977: Liens de famille, Paris, B. Grasset ISBN 978-2-246-00431-8
- 1982: Marie Bonaparte, a life, New York, Harcourt Brace Jovanovich ISBN 978-0-15-157252-6
- 1991: Jean Renoir, a Life in Pictures, Baltimore: Johns Hopkins University Press ISBN 978-0-8018-4184-2
- 1994: Femmes sous l'Occupation, Paris, Stock
- 1994: Jean Renoir, cinéaste, Paris, Gallimard, coll. "Découvertes Gallimard" nº 209; reissue: Gallimard, 2005, ISBN 978-2-07-031998-5
- 1999: Marie Bonaparte, la dernière Bonaparte, Paris, Perrin: présentation de Elisabeth Roudinesco
- 1999: Louise Weiss, Paris, Albin Michel ISBN 978-2-226-10776-3
- 2005: Femmes sous l'Occupation, Paris, Les Éditions de la Seine ISBN 978-2-7382-2029-5
- 2008: Portrait d'une femme romanesque: Jean Voilier, Paris, Éditions de Fallois ISBN 978-2-87706-636-5
- 2009: La Femme à Vienne au temps de Freud, Paris, Tallandier ISBN 978-2-84734-593-3
