= Martine Le Coz =

French writer

Martine Le Coz (born 13 September 1955 Charente) is a French novelist. She won the 2001 Prix Renaudot, for Céleste.

== Works ==
=== Novels ===
- Gilles de Raiz, la confession imaginaire, 1989; Éditions du Rocher, 2002, ISBN 978-2-268-04268-8
- Le Pharaon qui n'avait pas d'ombre, 1992; Iuniverse.Com, 1999, ISBN 978-1-58348-174-5
- La Palette du jeune Turner, Éditions du Rocher, 1993, ISBN 978-2-268-01558-3
- Le Journal de l'autre, Rocher, 1995, ISBN 978-2-268-01901-7
- Les Confins du jour, Editions du Rocher, 1996, ISBN 978-2-268-02185-0
- Léo, la nuit, Editions du Rocher, 1997, ISBN 978-2-268-02658-9
- Le Nègre et la Méduse, 1999; Le Serpent à Plumes, 2005, ISBN 978-2-7538-0033-5
- Céleste, Rocher, 2001, ISBN 978-2-268-04027-1
- Nos lointains et nos proches, Albin Michel, 2004, ISBN 978-2-226-15392-0
- La Reine écarlate, Albin Michel, 2007, ISBN 978-2-226-17690-5
- Le Jardin d'Orient, Michalon, 2008, ISBN 978-2-84186-439-3
- L’Homme électrique, Michalon, 2009, ISBN 978-2-84186-504-8

=== Poetry ===
- Le Chagrin du zèbre, Editions du Rocher, 1998, ISBN 978-2-268-02807-1
- Le Rire de l'arbre au milieu du jardin, Rocher, 2000, ISBN 978-2-268-03768-4
- La Couronne de vent, Al Manar, 2009, ISBN 978-2-913896-70-3
- Signe de ferveur noir, 2010

=== Non-fiction ===
- Hypnose et Graphologie, avec Erich Lancaster, Editions du Rocher, 1991,ISBN 2268014932
- Gilles de Raiz, ignoble et chrétien, 1995
- Le briquet, Editions du Rocher, 1997, ISBN 978-2-268-02709-8
- Catherine d'Alexandrie ou la Philosophie défaite par la foi, Editions du Rocher, 1999, ISBN 978-2-268-03094-4
- La Beauté Rocher, 2000, ISBN 978-2-268-03585-7
- Visages des voyageurs, 2002
- Hosana!, Michalon, 2003, ISBN 978-2-84186-214-6
- La Pierre et le Souffle, Farrago, 2004, ISBN 978-2-84490-159-0
