= Jean Reverzy =

Jean Reverzy (Balan, 10 April 1914–Lyon, 9 July 1959) was a French medical doctor from Lyon who won the Prix Renaudot in 1954 for Le Passage ("The Passage"), his first novel. It described the slow anguish of a patient with liver problems who returned with a tired woman of Polynesia. It is a description of the passage from life to death, in a raw and realistic manner, including poetic nostalgia.

Another work, Place des angoisses ("Agony Square"), describes through the eyes of a young doctor the ominous, oppressive atmosphere of Lyon's Bellecour - the city's medical quarter.
