= Valérie Manteau =

French writer, publisher and journalist

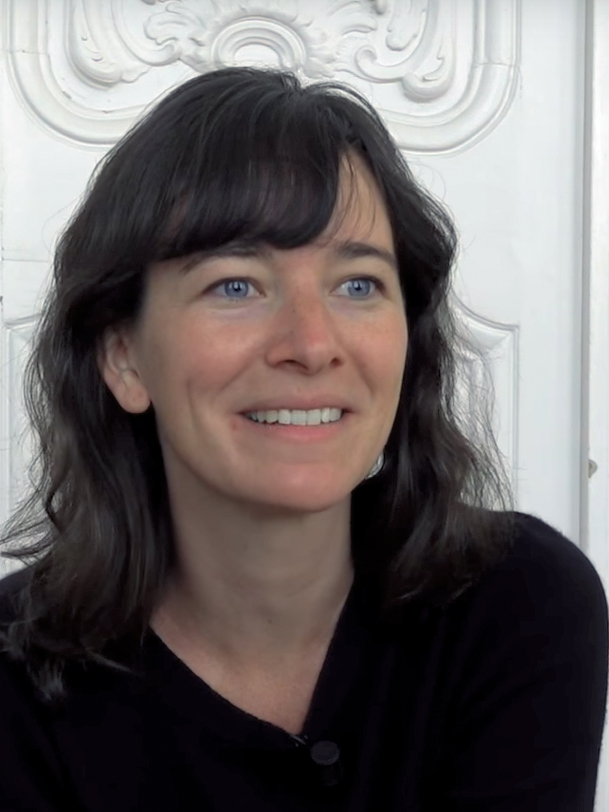
Valérie Manteau (in 2018)

Valérie Manteau (born in 1985) is a French writer, publisher and journalist.

== Life ==
Manteau was a contributor to the satirical journal Charlie Hebdo from 2009 to 2013, she was also an editor at Les Échappés from 2008 to 2013. In 2013, she joined the Museum of European and Mediterranean Civilisations in Marseille, as a publishing and distribution manager, which she left in 2018. Living in the Noailles district of Marseille, she is a member of the "Collectif du 5 novembre" - "Noailles en colère" created after the 2018 collapse of the Rue d'Aubagne. She is co-signatory of the forum Nous sommes tous des enfants de Noailles published in Le Monde dated 30 January 2019 along Robert Guédiguian, Keny Arkana, IAM, Sophie Calle, Barbara Cassin etc.

== Publications ==
Manteau is the author of the text Désir d'enfant, an autofiction for theatre directed by Jean-Paul Delore. Her first two books Calme et Tranquille (2016) and Le Sillon (2018) are published by "Le Tripode". For these first novels, the author drew inspiration from Turkey, a country dear to her, in order to weave her narrative.

With Calme et tranquille, Manteau wrote a biographical account between intimate memories and collective drama, or when violence suddenly breaks into daily life. For Le Sillon, the author focuses on the story of Hrant Dink, a Turkish journalist and writer of Armenian origin, who was murdered for defending an ideal of peace. She associates him with her own wandering in the streets of Istanbul. In 2018, she received the Prix Renaudot for this second book.

== Work ==
- Calme et Tranquille, Éditions Le Tripode, 200 p., 2016, ISBN 2370551119
- Le Sillon, Le Tripode, 2018 ISBN 2370551674

== Awards ==
- 2018: Prix Renaudot for Le Sillon
- 2018: Trophée littéraire des Nouvelles d'Arménie Magazine for Le Sillon
