= Marie-Hélène Lafon =

French educator and award-winning writer (born 1962)

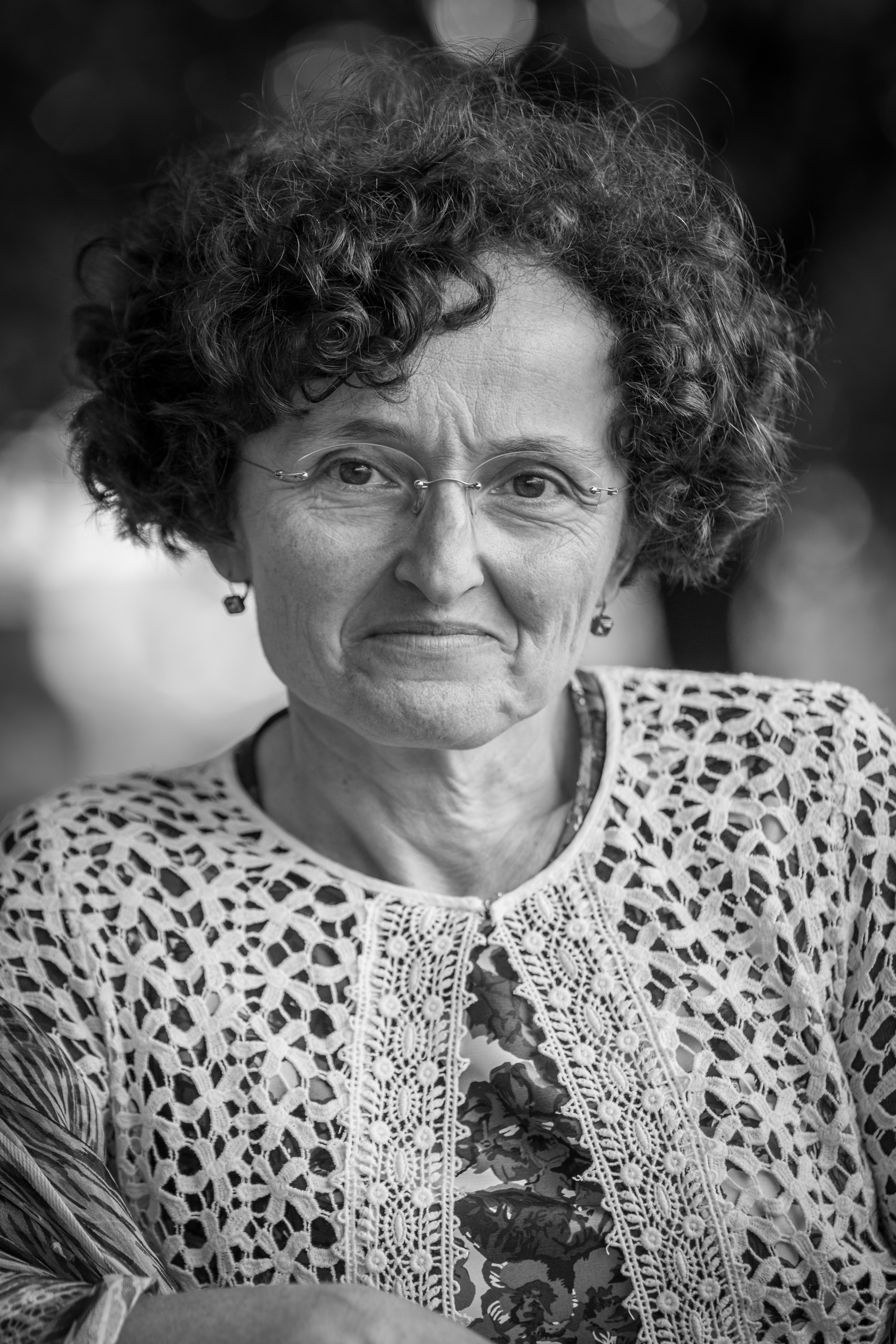
- Born: 1962 (age 63–64); Aurillac, Cantal, France
- Writing career
- Genres: novel, story

Marie-Hélène Lafon (born 1962) is a French educator and award-winning writer.

She was born in Aurillac in the Cantal department and grew up on the family farm there. She was educated at a religious boarding school in Saint-Flour and, after moving to Paris in 1980, continued her studies at the Sorbonne. She took her agrégation de grammaire in 1987, going on to teach classical literature. Lafon only began writing when she was 34, publishing her first novel Le soir du chien in 2001.

== Selected works ==
- Le soir du chien, novel (2001), received the Prix Renaudot young adult
- Liturgie, stories (2002), received the Prix Renaissance de la Nouvelle
- Sur la photo, novel (2003)
- Mo : roman, novel (2005)
- Organes, stories (2006)
- La maison Santoire (2007)
- Les Derniers Indiens, novel (2008)
- L'annonce, novel (2009)
- Gordana, novel (2009)
- Les Pays, novel (2012), received the Globe de Cristal Award
- Album, alphabet book (2012)
- Tensions toniques - les récits de Marie-Hélène Lafon, stories (2012)
- Traversée (2013)
- Joseph (2014)
- Chantiers (2015)
- Histoires (2016), received the Prix Goncourt de la nouvelle
- Nos vies (2017)
- Histoire du fils (2020), received the Prix Renaudot

== Legacy ==
The university library of Letters, Languages and Human Sciences of Clermont Auvergne University was renamed in her name in October 2021.
