= Simone Jacquemard =

French writer (1924–2009)

Simonne Jacquemard (1924 – 16 December 2009) was a French writer and winner of the 1962 Prix Renaudot. She married writer and ecologist Jacques Brosse.

== Works ==
- La famille Borgia: Roman, R. Laffont, 1957; La Thune du Guay, 1960
- Le Veilleur de nuit, Éditions du Seuil, 1962, Prix Renaudot
- Trois Mystiques grecs, Albin Michel, 1997, ISBN 978-2-226-08946-5
- Les Chevaux du vent, Roc de Bourzac, Editions du Roc De Bourzac, 2003, ISBN 978-2-87624-122-0
- Pythagore et l'harmonie des sphères, Seuil, 2004, ISBN 978-2-02-067887-2
- L'Ange musicien, Fédérop, 2006, ISBN 978-2-85792-168-4
