= Émile Faynot =

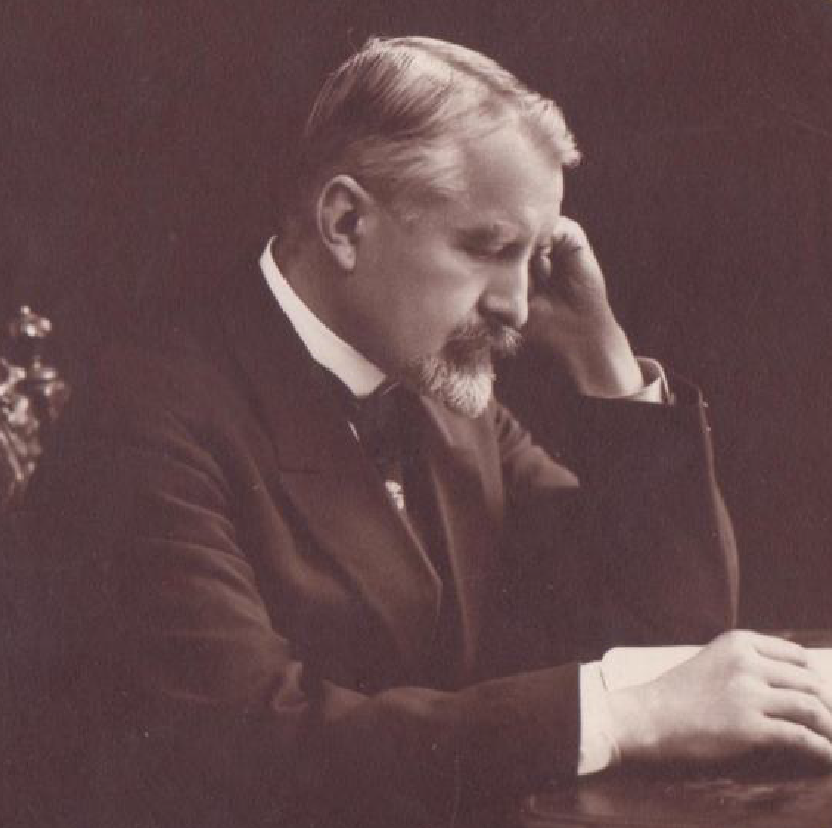

Émile Alphonse Faynot (French: [emil fɛno]; 1878–1962) was a French industrialist, watercolourist and illustrator. He was born in Levrézy in the Ardennes. A graduate of Arts and Crafts (Châlons, class of 1894), he founded the Faynot metalworks business in Thilay in 1912. The business continues to this day. His reputation as an illustrator rests on numerous works, e.g. his collaborations with the Ardennois writer Jean Rogissart among others.

Faynot died in Thilay in 1962.
