= L'Herbe à brûler =

1978 novel by Conrad Detrez

A Weed for Burning
- First edition
- Author: Conrad Detrez
- Original title: L'Herbe à brûler
- Translator: Lydia Davis
- Language: French
- Publisher: Calmann-Lévy
- Publication date: 1978
- Publication place: Paris
- English publication date: 1984
- Pages: 231 (French)
- Awards: Prix Renaudot, 1978
- ISBN: 978-2702102664
- Preceded by: Les plumes du coq (The Plumes of the Rooster)

L'Herbe à brûler (A Weed for Burning) is a Belgian novel by Conrad Detrez. It is the third volume of his "hallucinated autobiography" trilogy, following Ludo (1974) and Les plumes du coq (The Plumes of the Rooster, 1975). Published in 1978, it was awarded the Prix Renaudot the same year and is Detrez's best-known work. The novel is about a Roman Catholic from Belgium who, after years as a revolutionary in Brazil, returns to Europe and finds it enervated. It was first published in English by Harcourt Brace Jovanovich in 1984, translated by Lydia Davis.
