= Conrad Detrez =

Belgian journalist, diplomat and novelist

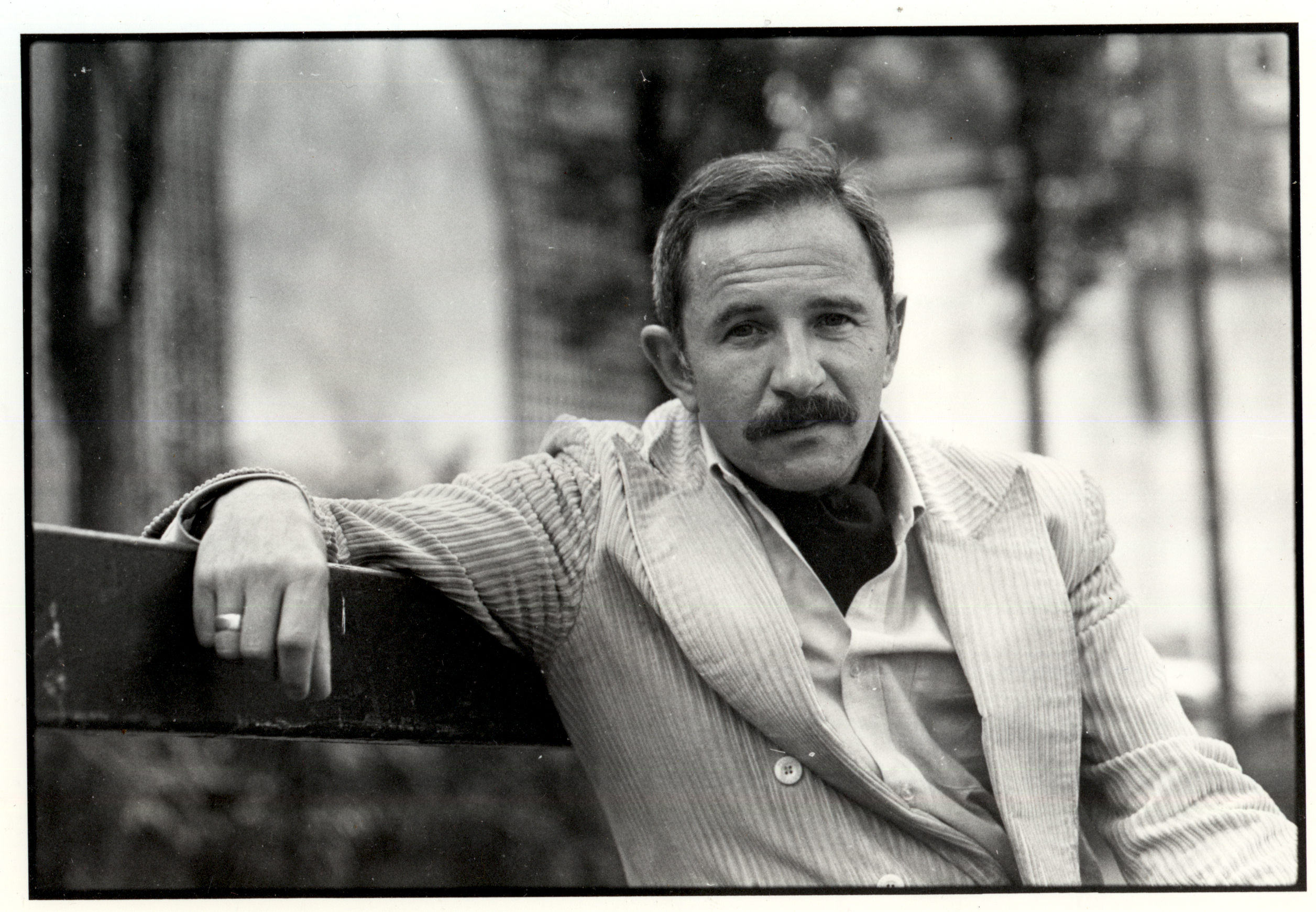
Detrez, the year before his death

Conrad Detrez (1 April 1937, in Roclenge-sur-Geer – 11 February 1985, in Paris) was a Belgian (from 1982 on French) journalist, diplomat and novelist.

== Biography ==
Conrad Detrez grew up in a small village in the Belgian countryside. In 1962 he travelled to Brazil as a lay missionary. He first stayed in Volta Redonda and from 1963 in Rio de Janeiro. He was a university teacher while at the same time working in the favelas. He discovered his homosexuality and gradually became involved in the resistance to the military dictatorship that was installed in 1964 in Brazil.

After being arrested and expelled from Rio de Janeiro in 1967, Detrez stayed some months in Paris, participating in the revolt of May 68. He returned to São Paulo where he became a journalist. In 1969 he secretly met and interviewed Brazilian guerrilla leader Carlos Marighella.

In the 1970s Detrez stayed in Algeria (as a teacher) and in Lisbon (as a radio journalist) after the Portuguese Carnation Revolution.

Before his writing career Detrez translated books by the Brazilian writers Jorge Amado and Antonio Callado. In 1978 he won the Prix Renaudot for his autobiographical novel L'Herbe à brûler.

In 1982 Detrez became a diplomat for the French government in Nicaragua. He died of AIDS.

== Critical reception ==
James Kirkup found Le dragueur de Dieu "beautifully written in a fluent, lucid and visionary manner" and praised the mixture of religious sensuality and intellectual mysticism.

Lydia Davis translated two of Detrez's novels into English.

== Works ==
- Carlos Marighella, Conrad Detrez, Pour la liberation du Bresil Aubier-Montaigne, 1970.
- Márcio Moreira Alves, Conrad Detrez, Carlos Marighella, Zerschlagt die Wohlstandsinseln der Dritten Welt, Rowohlt, 1971.
- Les pâtres de la nuit: roman, Stock, 1975.
- L'herbe à brûler: roman, 1977; Labor, 2003.
- A Weed for Burning, Harcourt Brace Jovanovich, 1984. (translated by Lydia Davis)
- Caballero ou l'irrésistible corps de l'homme-dieu, Galerie Jade, 1980.
- La lutte finale, Balland, 1980; Balland, 1996.
- Le dragueur de Dieu: roman, Calmann-Lévy, 1980.
- Les Noms de la tribu, Seuil, 1981
- Le mâle apôtre: poèmes, Persona, 1982
- La guerre blanche: roman, Calmann-Lévy, 1982.
- La ceinture de feu: roman, Gallimard, 1984.
- Zone of Fire, Harcourt Brace Jovanovich, 1986. (translated by Lydia Davis)
- La mélancolie du voyeur, Denoël, 1986.
- Ludo: roman, Labor, 1988.
- Les plumes du coq, Actes sud, 1995.

== Secondary sources ==
- Peter Daerden, Revolutie in Rio. Conrad Detrez tussen God en guerilla, samba en saudade. Tzara, 2023. ISBN 9789022340301
