= Mulford Q. Sibley =

Professor of political science

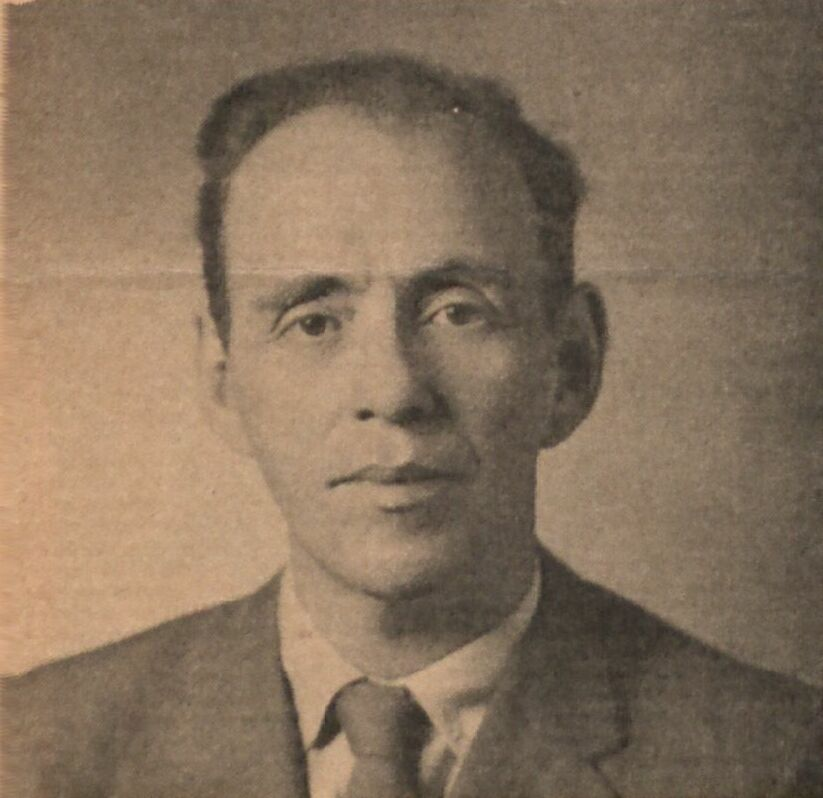
- Mulfred Q Sibley, early 1960s
- Born: June 14, 1912; Marston, Missouri, U.S.
- Died: April 19, 1989 (aged 76)

Mulford Quickert Sibley (1912–1989) was a professor of political science at the University of Minnesota.

He was a controversial figure because he advocated positions such as socialism and pacifism at a time (the McCarthy era of the 1950s) when these were highly unpopular. A prolific author and essayist, Sibley wrote extensively on pacifism, utopianism, and civil disobedience. A collection of his papers at the Minnesota Historical Society includes correspondence, literary works, and teaching materials. Both in his classes and at political rallies, Sibley often spoke out against the Vietnam War. The University of Minnesota retains an inventory of the Sibley papers.

== Bibliography ==
- Sibley, M. Q. (1944). The political theories of modern pacifism : an analysis and criticism. Philadelphia, Pa., Pacifist Research Bureau : Distributed by the Peace Section, American Friends Service Committee.
- Sibley, M. Q. and A. W. Wardlaw (1945). Conscientious objectors in prison, 1940–1945. Philadelphia, Pa., The Pacifist research bureau.
- Sibley, M. Q. and P. E. Jacob (1952). Conscription of conscience; the American state and the conscientious objector, 1940–1947. Ithaca, Cornell University Press.
- Sibley, M. Q. (1962). Unilateral initiatives and disarmament; a study and commentary. [Philadelphia, Peace Literature service of the American Friends Service Committee.
- Sibley, M. Q. (1963). The quiet battle; writings on the theory and practice of non-violent resistance. Garden City, N.Y., Doubleday.
- Sibley, M. Q. (1970). The obligation to disobey; conscience & the law. [New York], Council on Religion and International Affairs.
- Sibley, M. Q. (1970). Political ideas and ideologies; a history of political thought. New York, Harper & Row.
- Sibley, M. Q. (1971). Technology and utopian thought. Minneapolis, Burgess Pub. Co.
- Sibley, M. Q. and T. Paullin (1972). The political theories of modern pacifism; an analysis and criticism. New York, Garland Pub.
- Sibley, M. Q. (1972) Conscience, Law, and the Obligation to obey, The Monist, Oxford University Press
- Sibley, M. Q. (1975). Life after death? Minneapolis, Dillon Press.
- Sibley, M. Q. (1977). Nature and civilization : some implications for politics. Itasca, Ill., F. E. Peacock.
- Sibley, M. Q., A. L. Kalleberg, et al. (1983). Dissent and affirmation : essays in honor of Mulford Q. Sibley. Bowling Green, Ohio, Bowling Green University Popular Press.
