= Drouant =

Restaurant in Paris

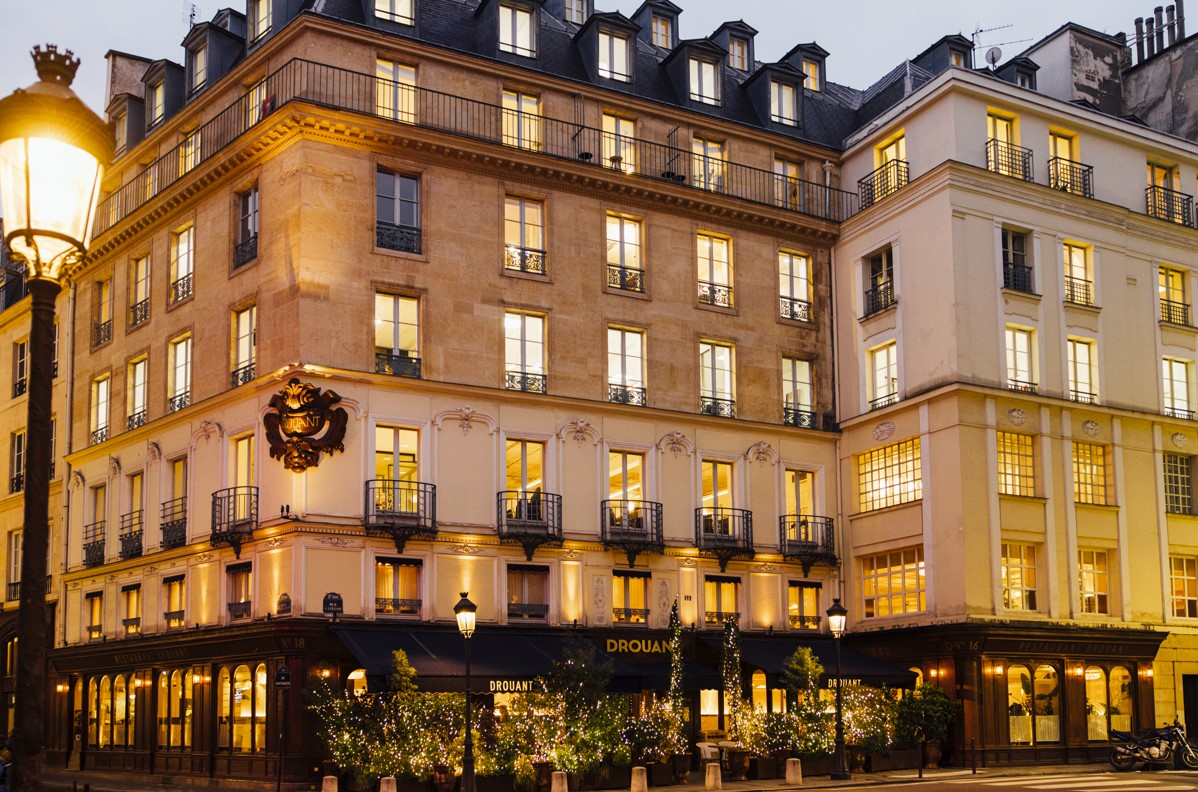
- Drouant in 2023

- Location within Paris

Restaurant information
- Established: 1880
- Chef: Roman Van Thienen
- Food type: French cuisine
- Location: 16–18 place Gaillon, Paris, France
- Coordinates: 48°52′08″N 2°20′04″E
- Website: www.drouant.com

Drouant (French pronunciation: [dʁuɑ̃]) is a well-known restaurant located in the Palais Garnier neighborhood in the 2nd arrondissement of Paris, France. It was founded in 1880 by Charles Drouant. The restaurant has been receiving the jury of the Prix Goncourt every year since 1914, as well as the jury of the Prix Renaudot since 1926. Drouant's cuisine is led by chef Émile Cotte.

== History ==
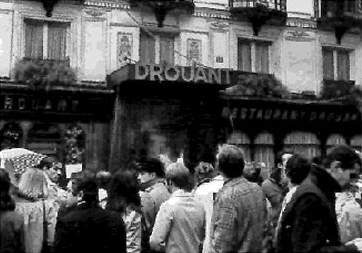
Drouant in 1956

The establishment was founded as a bar and tobacco shop by Charles Drouant in 1880. At the turn of the century, it gained popularity thanks to its fresh oysters delivered by Drouant's brother-in-law, who farmed them in Brittany. The restaurant was taken over by Charles Drouant's son Jean Drouant in 1914, then by Jean's nephew –also named Jean– from 1946 to 1976. The latter sold the restaurant to Robert Pascal, a bougnat from Aveyron who had been working at Drouant for forty years. The establishment changed hands several times between 1986 and 2006. Thanks to chef Louis Gondard, the restaurant was awarded 1 star by the Michelin Guide in 1988, then 2 stars in 2005.

In 2006, the 3-star Alsatian chef Antoine Westermann, a member of the Drouant family, became the chef and owner of the restaurant. The establishment was officially renamed Drouant par Antoine Westermann.

In 2018, the restaurant was bought by the Gardinier brothers from the Gardinier & Fils company.

== Cuisine ==
Since 2018, Émile Cotte has been the chef of Drouant. He offers French dishes made of seasonal products.

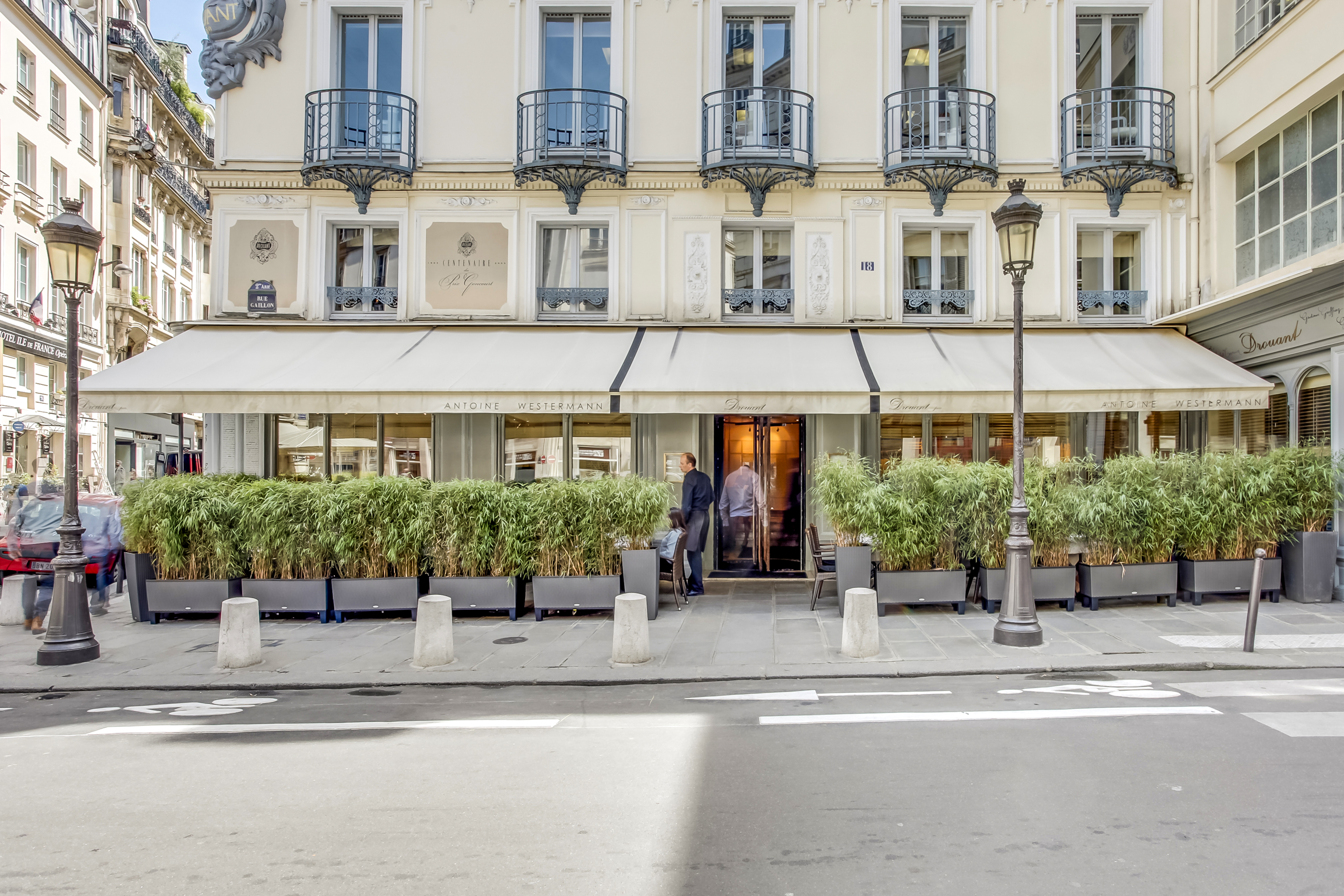

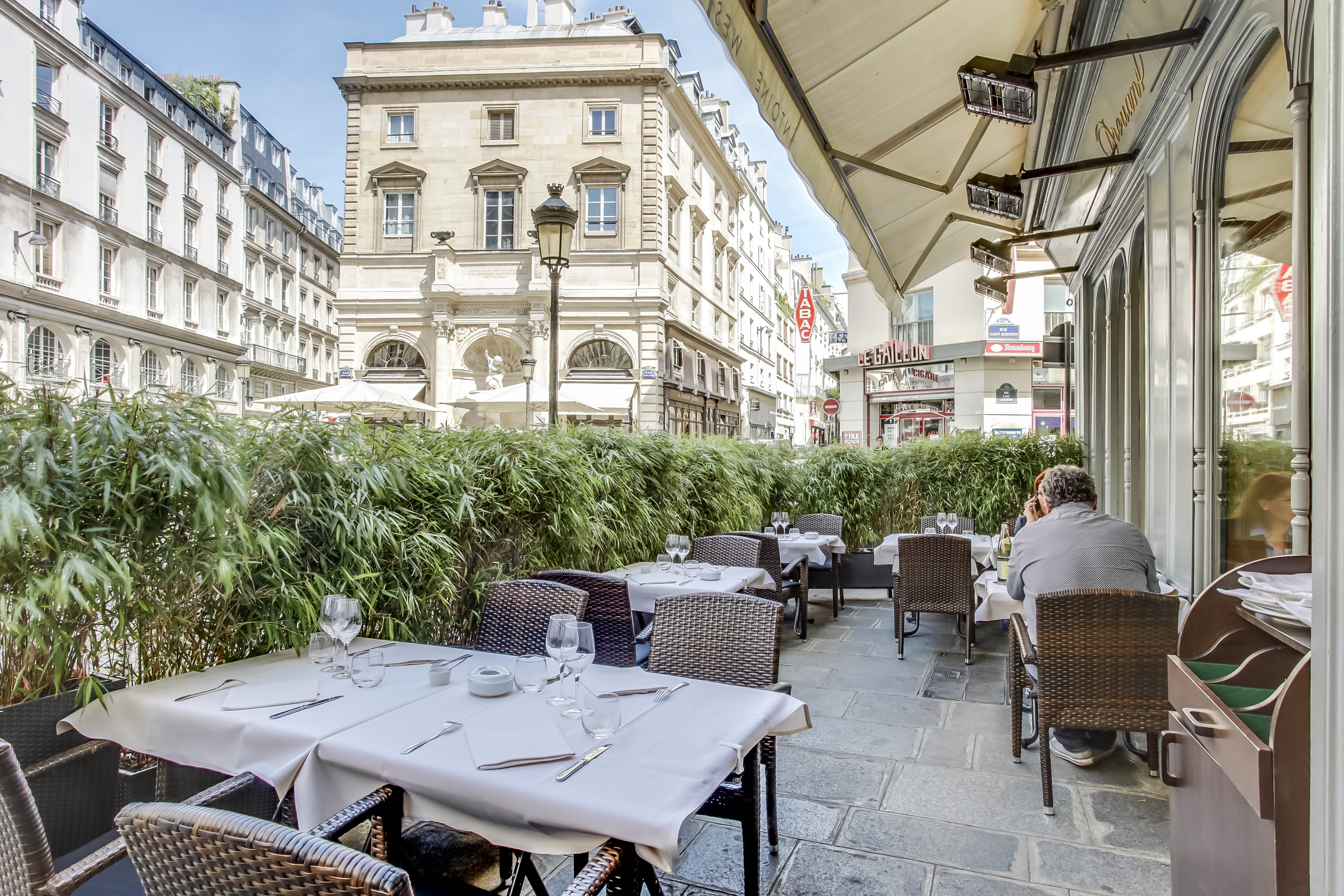

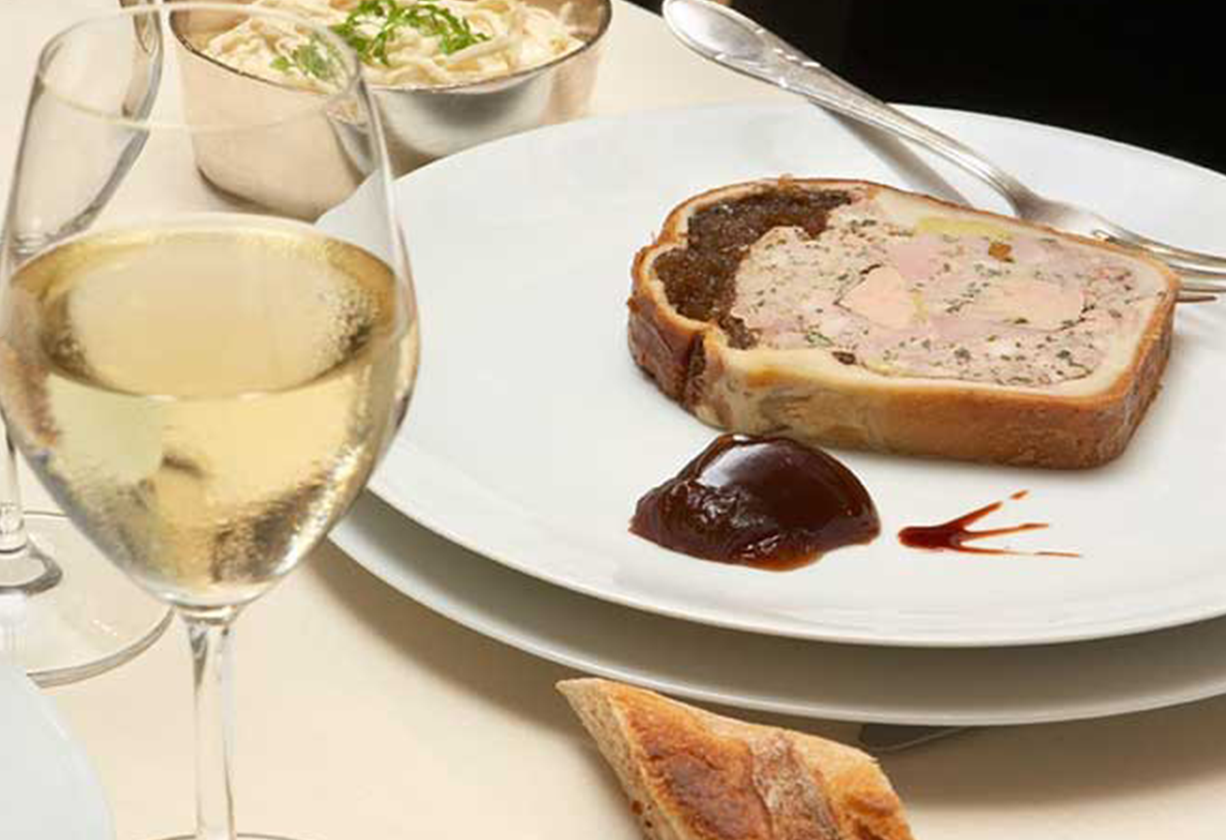
Pâté en croûte by Drouant.

== Inner architecture ==
The private lounges are located on the upper floors. The ground floor designed by architect Pascal Desprez has a light setting inspired by the Neoclassical style.

In 2014, quotes of each of the 10 jury members of the Prix Goncourt were written on the inner walls of the restaurant as a commemoration of the 100th anniversary of the award.

== Culture ==
=== Prix Goncourt and Prix Renaudot ===
Since October 31, 1914 the jury members of the Prix Goncourt have been gathering on the first Tuesday of each month in Drouant's first-floor lounge named salon Goncourt. During the November meetings, the jury vote for the Goncourt winner of the year.

The Prix Renaudot jury have been gathering in another lounge named salon Renaudot since 1926.

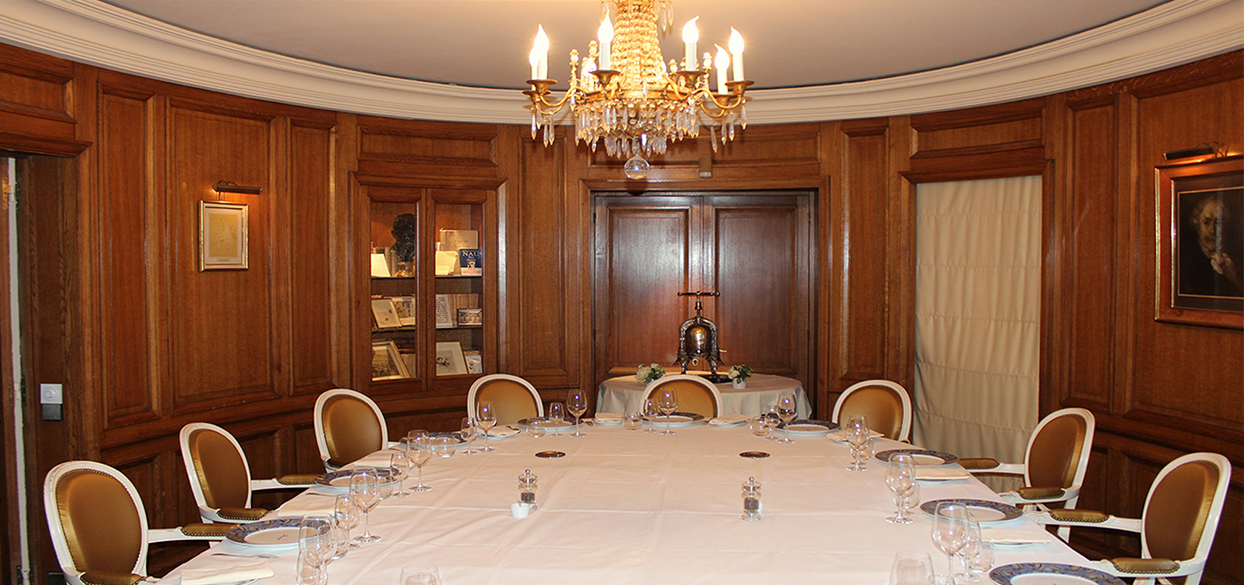
The salon Goncourt

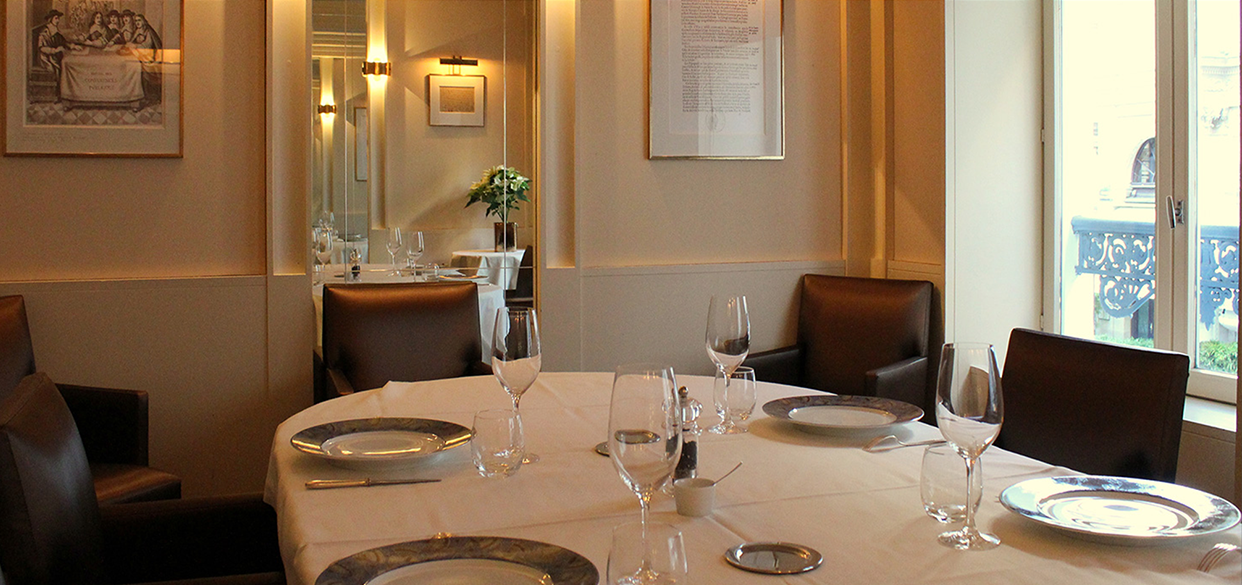
The salon Renaudot

=== Drouant in popular culture ===
A scene of Gérard Oury's film The Sucker (1965) was shot in the restaurant.
