= Erik Blumenfeld =

German politician (1915–1997)

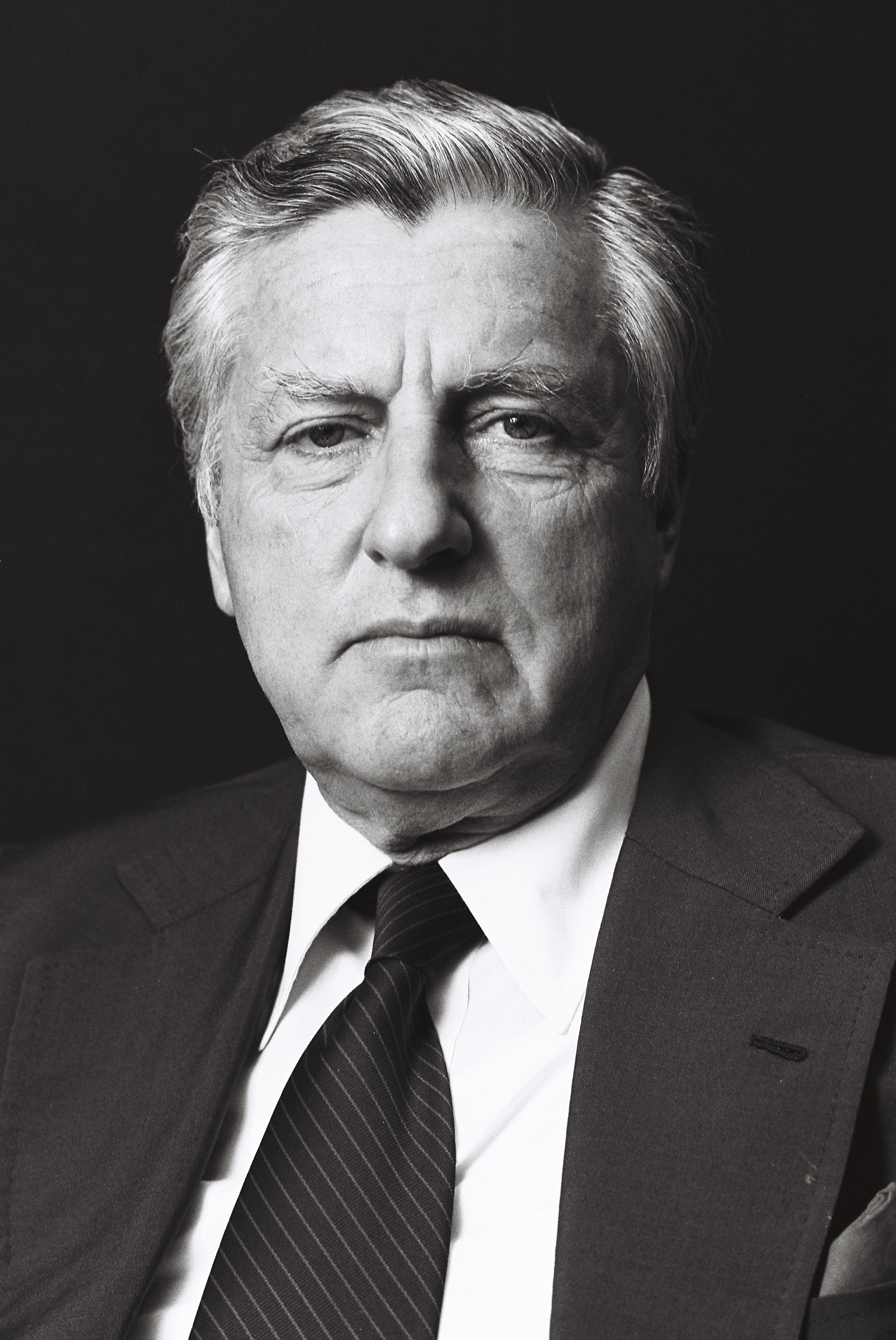

Member of the Bundestag
- In office 17 October 1961 – 4 November 1980

Personal details
- Born: 27 March 1915 Hamburg
- Died: 10 April 1997 (aged 82) Hamburg, Germany
- Party: Christian Democratic Union of Germany

Erik Bernhard Blumenfeld (March 27, 1915 – April 10, 1997) was a German politician of the Christian Democratic Union of Germany and former member of the German Bundestag.

== Life ==
Blumenfeld was a founding member of the CDU in Hamburg. As early as 1946, Blumenfeld was first elected to the Hamburg parliament in the Harvestehude constituency and remained a member until 1955. From 1966 to 1970 and from 1978 to 1979, he was again a member of the Bürgerschaft.

In 1961, he became a member of the German Bundestag and in 1973 also of the European Parliament. In addition to his Bundestag activities, he was again a member of the Hamburg Parliament from 1966 to 1970 and from 1978 to 30 September 1979. He left the Bundestag in 1980 and the European Parliament in 1989.

== Literature ==
Herbst, Ludolf; Jahn, Bruno (2002). Vierhaus, Rudolf (ed.). Biographisches Handbuch der Mitglieder des Deutschen Bundestages. 1949–2002 [Biographical Handbook of the Members of the German Bundestag. 1949–2002] (in German). München: De Gruyter - De Gruyter Saur. p. 1715. ISBN 978-3-11-184511-1.
