= Prix Renaudot =

French literary award

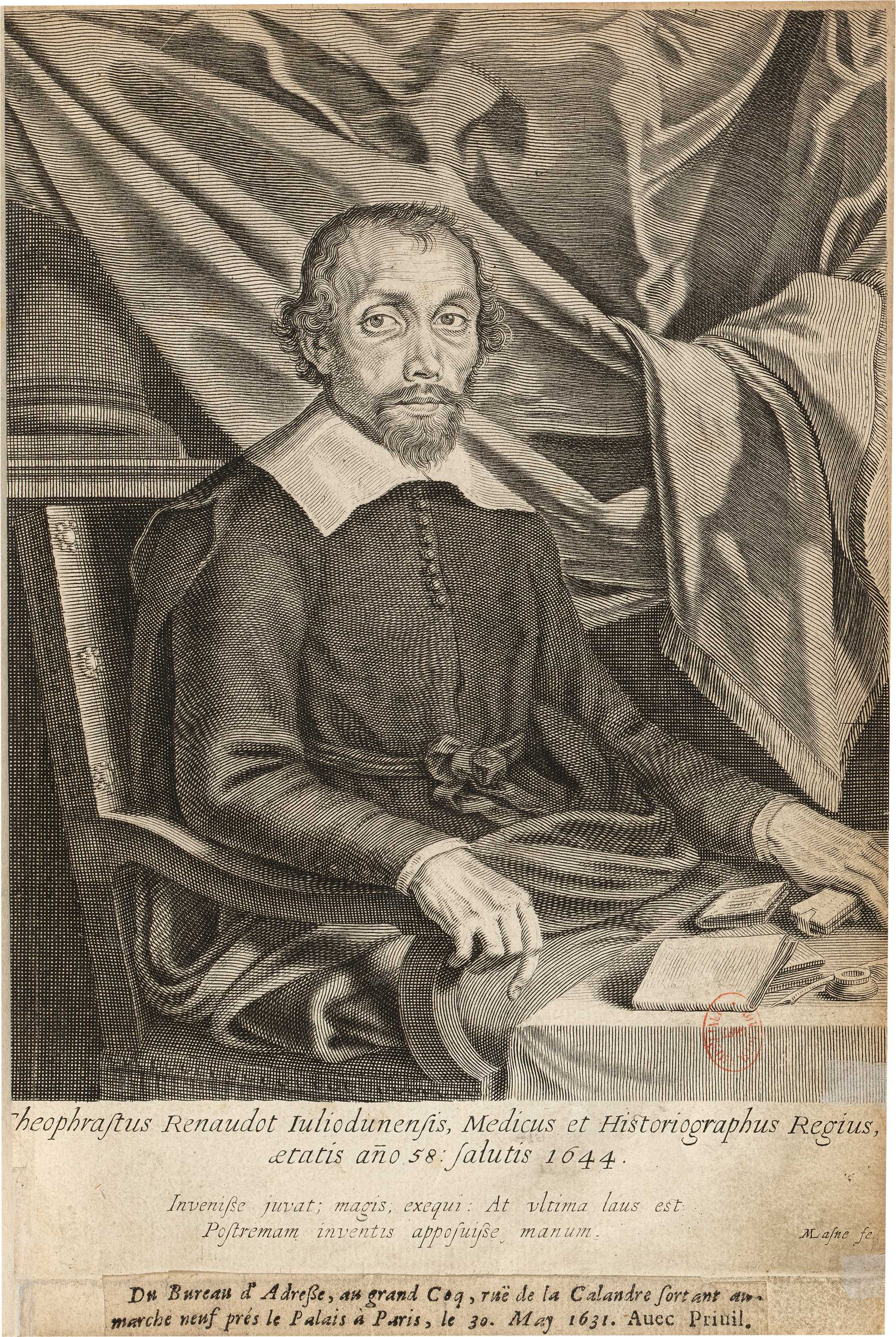
- Portrait of Theophraste Renaudot, the prize's namesake
- Country: France
- First award: 1926
- Website: http://prixrenaudot.free.fr/

The Prix Théophraste-Renaudot or Prix Renaudot (French pronunciation: [pʁi teɔfʁast ʁənodo]) is a French literary award.

== History ==
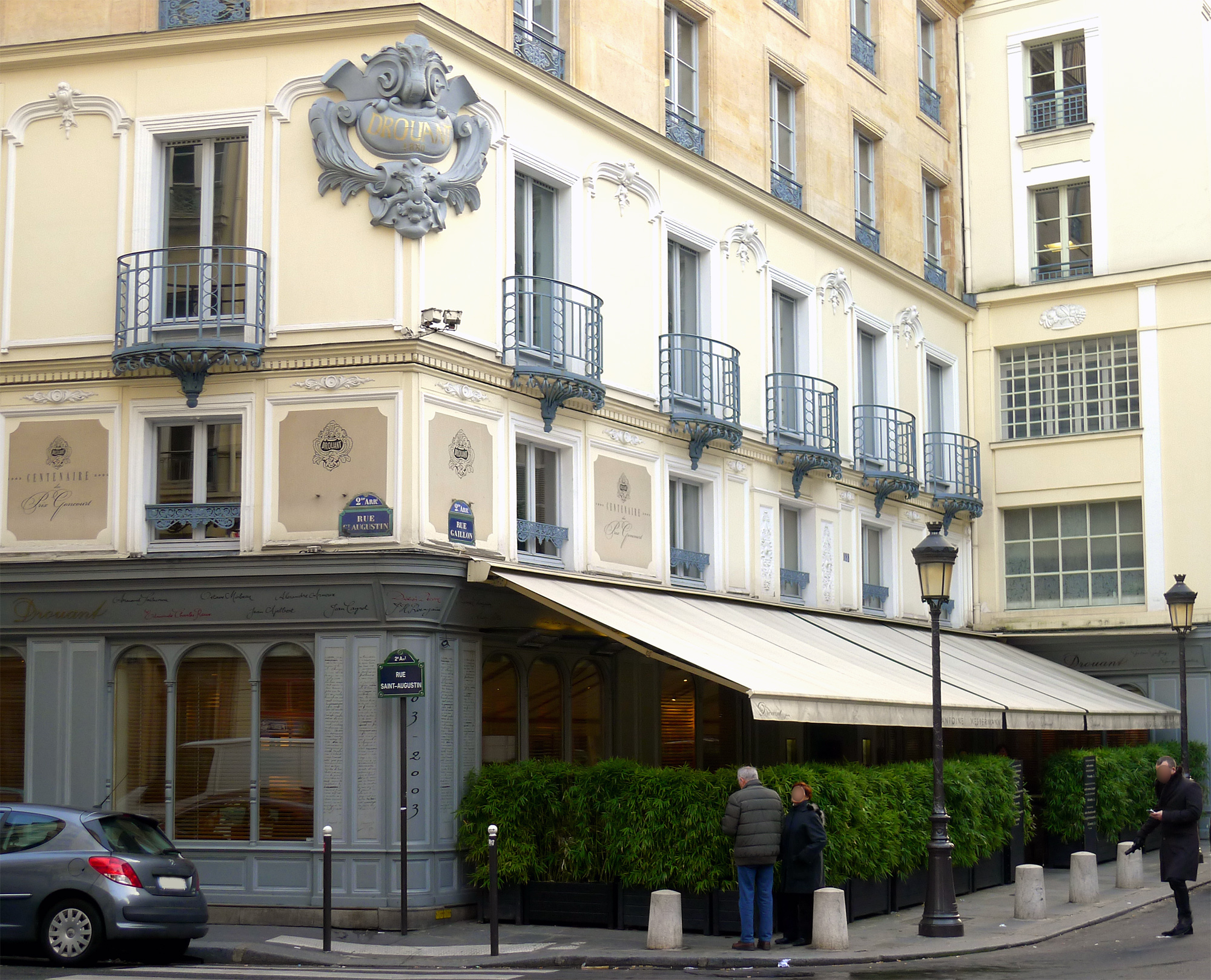
The Drouant restaurant in Paris

The prize was created in 1926 by ten art critics awaiting the results of deliberation of the jury of the Prix Goncourt. While not officially related to the Prix Goncourt, it remains a complement to it: The Prix Renaudot laureate is announced at the same time and place as the Prix Goncourt, namely on the first Tuesday of November at the Drouant restaurant in Paris. The Renaudot jurors always pick an alternative laureate in case their first choice is awarded the Prix Goncourt.

The prize is named after Théophraste Renaudot, who created the first French newspaper in 1631.

In 2013, winning the Prix Renaudot essay revived the career of Gabriel Matzneff. His career later collapsed in 2020 as his paedophilia – long known and defended by his literary peers, including the Renaudot jurors – became more widely known through a report of one of his victims, Vanessa Springora. In the view of The New York Times, the episode illustrated "the self-perpetuating and impenetrable nature of many of France's elite institutions", including the Prix Renaudot, where "control often rests with a small, established group — overwhelmingly older, white men — that rewards like-minded friends", disregarding conflicts of interest. At the time, only one woman sat on the jury of the prize. French media also criticized the prize, and one judge, Jérôme Garcin, left the jury, but no changes took place.

== Jury ==
As of 2021, the jury consists of:

- Christian Giudicelli
- Dominique Bona
- Franz-Olivier Giesbert
- Georges-Olivier Châteaureynaud
- Jean-Noël Pancrazi
- Patrick Besson
- Frédéric Beigbeder
- Stéphanie Janicot
- Cécile Guilbert
- J. M. G. Le Clezio

== Laureates ==
- 1926: Nicolo Peccavi, Armand Lunel (Éditions Gallimard)
- 1927: Maïtena, Bernard Nabonne (Grasset)
- 1928: Le Joueur de triangle, André Obey (Grasset)
- 1929: La Table aux crevés, Marcel Aymé (Gallimard)
- 1930: Piège, Germaine Beaumont (Lemerre)
- 1931: L'Innocent, Philippe Hériat (Denoël)
- 1932: Voyage au bout de la nuit, Louis-Ferdinand Céline (Denoël)
- 1933: Le roi dort, Charles Braibant (Denoël)
- 1934: Blanc, Louis Francis (Gallimard)
- 1935: Jours sans gloire, François de Roux (Gallimard)
- 1936: Les Beaux Quartiers, Louis Aragon (Denoël)
- 1937: Mervale, Jean Rogissart (Denoël)
- 1938: Léonie la bienheureuse, Pierre Jean Launay (Denoël)
- 1939: Les Javanais, Jean Malaquais (Denoël)
- 1940: La Vallée heureuse, Jules Roy (Charlot)
- 1941: Quand le temps travaillait pour nous, Paul Mousset (Grasset)
- 1942: Les Liens de chaîne, Robert Gaillard (Colbert)
- 1943: J'étais médecin avec les chars, Dr. André Soubiran (Didier)
- 1944: Les Amitiés particulières, Roger Peyrefitte (La Table ronde)
- 1945: Le Mas Théotime, Henri Bosco (Charlot)
- 1946: L'Univers concentrationnaire, David Rousset (Minuit)
- 1947: Je vivrai l'amour des autres, Jean Cayrol (Le Seuil)
- 1948: Voyage aux horizons, Pierre Fisson (Julliard)
- 1949: Le Jeu de patience, Louis Guilloux (Gallimard)
- 1950: Les Orgues de l'enfer, Pierre Molaine (Corréa)
- 1951: Le Dieu nu, Robert Margerit (Gallimard)
- 1952: L'Amour de rien, Jacques Perry (Julliard)
- 1953: La Dernière Innocence, Célia Bertin (Corréa)
- 1954: Le Passage, Jean Reverzy (Julliard)
- 1955: Le Moissonneur d'épines, Georges Govy (La Table ronde)
- 1956: Le Père, André Perrin (Julliard)
- 1957: La Modification, Michel Butor (Minuit)
- 1958: La Lézarde, Édouard Glissant (Le Seuil)
- 1959: L'Expérience, Albert Palle (Julliard)
- 1960: Le Bonheur fragile, Alfred Kern (Gallimard)
- 1961: Les Blés, Roger Bordier (Calmann-Lévy)
- 1962: Le Veilleur de nuit, Simone Jacquemard (Le Seuil)
- 1963: Le Procès-verbal, J. M. G. Le Clézio (Gallimard)
- 1964: L'Écluse, Jean-Pierre Faye (Le Seuil)
- 1965: Les Choses, Georges Perec (Julliard)
- 1966: La Bataille de Toulouse, José Cabanis (Gallimard)
- 1967: Le Monde tel qu'il est, Salvat Etchart (Mercure de France)
- 1968: Le Devoir de violence, Yambo Ouologuem (Le Seuil)
- 1969: Les Feux de la colère, Max Olivier-Lacamp (Grasset)
- 1970: Isabelle ou l'arrière-saison, Jean Freustié (La Table ronde)
- 1971: Le Sac du palais d'été, Pierre-Jean Rémy (Gallimard)
- 1972: La Nuit américaine, Christopher Frank (Le Seuil)
- 1973: La Terrasse des Bernardini, Suzanne Prou (Calmann-Lévy)
- 1974: Voyage à l'étranger, Georges Borgeaud (Grasset)
- 1975: L'Homme de sable, Jean Joubert (Grasset)
- 1976: L'Amour les yeux fermés, Michel Henry (Gallimard)
- 1977: Les Combattants du petit bonheur, Alphonse Boudard (La Table ronde)
- 1978: L'Herbe à brûler, Conrad Detrez (Calmann-Lévy)
- 1979: Affaires étrangères, Jean-Marc Roberts (Le Seuil)
- 1980: Les Portes de Gubbio, Danièle Sallenave (Le Seuil)
- 1981: La Nuit du décret, Michel Del Castillo (Le Seuil)
- 1982: La Faculté des songes, Georges-Olivier Châteaureynaud (Grasset)
- 1983: Avant-Guerre, Jean-Marie Rouart (Grasset)
- 1984: La Place, Annie Ernaux (Gallimard)
- 1985: Mes nuits sont plus belles que vos jours, Raphaëlle Billetdoux (Grasset)
- 1986: Station balnéaire, Christian Giudicelli (Gallimard)
- 1987: L'Enfant halluciné, René-Jean Clot (Grasset)
- 1988: Hadriana dans tous mes rêves, René Depestre (Gallimard)
- 1989: Les Comptoirs du Sud, Philippe Doumenc (Le Seuil)
- 1990: Les Frères Romance, Jean Colombier (Calmann-Lévy)
- 1991: La Séparation, Dan Franck (Le Seuil)
- 1992: La Démence du boxeur, François Weyergans (Gallimard)
- 1993: Les Corps célestes, Nicolas Bréhal
- 1994: Comme ton père, Guillaume Le Touze (L'Olivier)
- 1995: Les Braban, Patrick Besson
- 1996: Un silence d'environ une demi-heure, Boris Schreiber
- 1997: Les Voleurs de beauté, Pascal Bruckner (Grasset)
- 1998: Le Manuscrit de Port-Ebène, Dominique Bona (Gallimard)
- 1999: L'Enfant léopard, Daniel Picouly (Grasset)
- 2000: Allah n'est pas obligé, Ahmadou Kourouma (Le Seuil)
- 2001: Céleste, Martine Le Coz (Editions du Rocher)
- 2002: Assam, Gérard de Cortanze (Albin Michel)
- 2003: Les Âmes grises, Philippe Claudel (Stock)
- 2004: Suite française, Irène Némirovsky (Denoël)
- 2005: Mes mauvaises pensées, Nina Bouraoui (Stock)
- 2006: Mémoires de porc-épic, Alain Mabanckou (Le Seuil)
- 2007: Chagrin d'école, Daniel Pennac (Gallimard)
- 2008: Le Roi de Kahel (The King of Kahel), Tierno Monénembo (Le Seuil)
- 2009: Un roman français, Frédéric Beigbeder (Grasset)
- 2010: Apocalypse bébé, Virginie Despentes (Grasset)
- 2011: Limonov, Emmanuel Carrère (P.O.L.)
- 2012: Notre-Dame du Nil, Scholastique Mukasonga (Gallimard/Continents Noirs)
- 2013: Naissance, Yann Moix (Grasset)
- 2014: Charlotte, David Foenkinos (Gallimard)
- 2015: D'après une histoire vraie, Delphine de Vigan (Lattès)
- 2016: Babylone, Yasmina Reza (Flammarion)
- 2017: La disparition de Josef Mengele, Olivier Guez (Grasset)
- 2018: Le Sillon, Valérie Manteau (Le Tripode)
- 2019: La Panthère des neiges, Sylvain Tesson (Gallimard)
- 2020: Histoire du fils, Marie-Hélène Lafon (Buchet/Chastel)
- 2021: Premier Sang, Amélie Nothomb (Albin Michel)
- 2022: Performance, Simon Liberati (Grasset)
- 2023: Les Insolents, Ann Scott
- 2024: Jacaranda, Gaël Faye
- 2025: Je voulais vivre, Adélaïde de Clermont-Tonnerre (Grasset)

== Other awards ==
=== Prix Renaudot de l'essai ===
- 2001: Protée et autres essais, Simon Leys (Gallimard)
- 2002: Le Silence de Delphes, Claude-Michel Cluny (La Différence)
- 2003: Dictionnaire amoureux de l'Amérique, Yves Berger (Plon)
- 2004: Madame Proust, Évelyne Bloch-Dano (Grasset)
- 2005: Le Roman de Constantinople, Gilles Martin-Chauffier (Le Rocher)
- 2006: Jean-François Revel : un esprit libre, Pierre Boncenne (Plon)
- 2007: Le Benarès-Kyôto, Olivier Germain-Thomas (Le Rocher)
- 2008: Autobiographie d'un épouvantail, Boris Cyrulnik (Odile Jacob)
- 2009: Alias Caracalla, Daniel Cordier (Gallimard)
- 2010: L'affaire de l'esclave Furcy, Mohammed Aïssaoui (Gallimard)
- 2011: Fontenoy ne reviendra plus, Gérard Guégan (Stock)
- 2012: Le Dernier Modèle, Frank Maubert (Fayard)
- 2013: Séraphin c'est la fin!, Gabriel Matzneff (La Table ronde)
- 2014: De chez nous, Christian Authier (Stock)
- 2015: Leïlah Mahi 1932, Didier Blonde (Gallimard)
- 2016: Le Monde libre, Aude Lancelin (Les Liens qui libèrent)
- 2017: De l'ardeur, Justine Augier (Actes Sud)
- 2018: Avec toutes mes sympathies, Olivia de Lamberterie (Stock)
- 2019: (Très) cher cinéma français, Éric Neuhoff (Albin Michel)
- 2020: Les Villes de papier : Une vie d'Emily Dickinson, Dominique Fortier (Alto, Grasset)
- 2021: Dans ma rue y avait trois boutiques Anthony Palou (Presses de la Cité)
- 2022: Déjeunons sur l'herbe, Guillaume Durand (Bouquins)
- 2023: De Gaulle, une vie : l'homme de personne (1890–1944), Jean-Luc Barré

=== Prix Renaudot du livre de poche ===
- 2009: Palestine, Hubert Haddad (Le Livre de Poche/Zulma)
- 2010: L'origine de la violence, Fabrice Humbert (Le Livre de poche)
- 2011: A l'enfant que je n'aurai pas, Linda Lê (NiL)
- 2012: Les Vieilles, Pascale Gautier (Folio/Gallimard)
- 2013: Le Pérégrin émerveillé, Jean-Louis Gouraud (Babel/Actes Sud)
- 2014: Le Garçon incassable, Florence Seyvos (Points)
- 2015: La fiancée était à dos d'âne, Vénus Khoury-Ghata (Folio/Gallimard)
- 2016: La mémoire du monde, Stéphanie Janicot (Le Livre de poche)
- 2017: Les méduses ont-elles sommeil ?, Louisiane C. Dor (Folio/Gallimard)
- 2018: Dieu, Allah, moi et les autres, Salim Bachi (Folio/Gallimard)
- 2019: Une vieille histoire. Nouvelle version, Jonathan Littell (Folio/Gallimard)
- 2020: Charles de Gaulle, Éric Roussel (Tempus/Perrin)
- 2021: Louis Jouvet, Olivier Rony
- 2022: Vivre avec nos morts, Delphine Horvilleur
- 2023: Le Retournement, Manuel Carcassonne

=== Prix Renaudot des lycéens ===
- 1992: Aden, Anne-Marie Garat, (Seuil)
- 1993: Jacob Jacobi, Jack-Alain Léger, (Julliard)
- 1994: Une mort de théâtre, Claude Mourthé, (Julliard)
- 1995: Le Jeu du roman, Louise Lambrichs (Seuil)
- 1996: L'Ode à la reine, Jean-François Kervéan (Calmann-Lévy)
- 1997: L'Homme du cinquième jour, Jean-Philippe Arrou-Vignod, (Gallimard)
- 1998: Une poignée de gens, Anne Wiazemsky, (Gallimard)
- 1999: Foraine, Paul Fournel, (Seuil)
- 2000: Dans ces bras-là, Camille Laurens, (POL)
- 2001: Le Soir du chien, Marie-Hélène Lafon, (Buchet Chastel)
- 2002: La Métaphysique du chien, Philippe Ségur, (Buchet Chastel)
- 2003: Silence, on ment, Gilles Martin-Chauffier, (Grasset)
- 2004: La Dernière Leçon, Noëlle Châtelet, (Seuil)
- 2005: Festins secrets, Pierre Jourde, (L'Esprit des péninsules)
- 2006: Maos, Morgan Sportès, (Grasset)
- 2007: Le Cœur cousu Carole Martinez, (Gallimard)
- 2008: Le Voyage du fils, Olivier Poivre d'Arvor, (Grasset)
- 2009: Ce que je sais de Vera Candida, Véronique Ovaldé, (L'Olivier)
- 2010: Dans la nuit brune Agnès Desarthe, (L'Olivier)
- 2011: Rien ne s'oppose à la nuit, Delphine de Vigan, (Jean-Claude Lattès)
- 2012: L'Hiver des hommes, Lionel Duroy, (Julliard)
- 2013: Plonger, Christophe Ono-dit-Biot, (Gallimard)
- 2014: L'Amour et les Forêts, Éric Reinhardt, (Gallimard)
- 2015: Juste avant l'oubli, Alice Zeniter
- 2016: Giboulées de soleil, Lenka Hornakova-Civade, (Alma)
- 2017: Nos richesses, Kaouther Adimi, (Le Seuil)
- 2018: La Vraie vie, Adeline Dieudonné (L'Iconoclaste)
- 2019: Le Bal des folles, Victoria Mas (Albin Michel)
- 2020: Le Métier de Mourir, Jean-René Van der Plaetsen (Grasset)
- 2021: La carte postale, Anne Berest (Grasset)
- 2022: On était des loups, Sandrine Collette
- 2023: Panorama, Lilia Hassaine
