= Charles Braibant =

French archivist, author and novelist (1889–1976)

Charles Braibant (31 March 1889, in Villemomble – 23 April 1976, in Paris) was a French archivist, author and novelist.

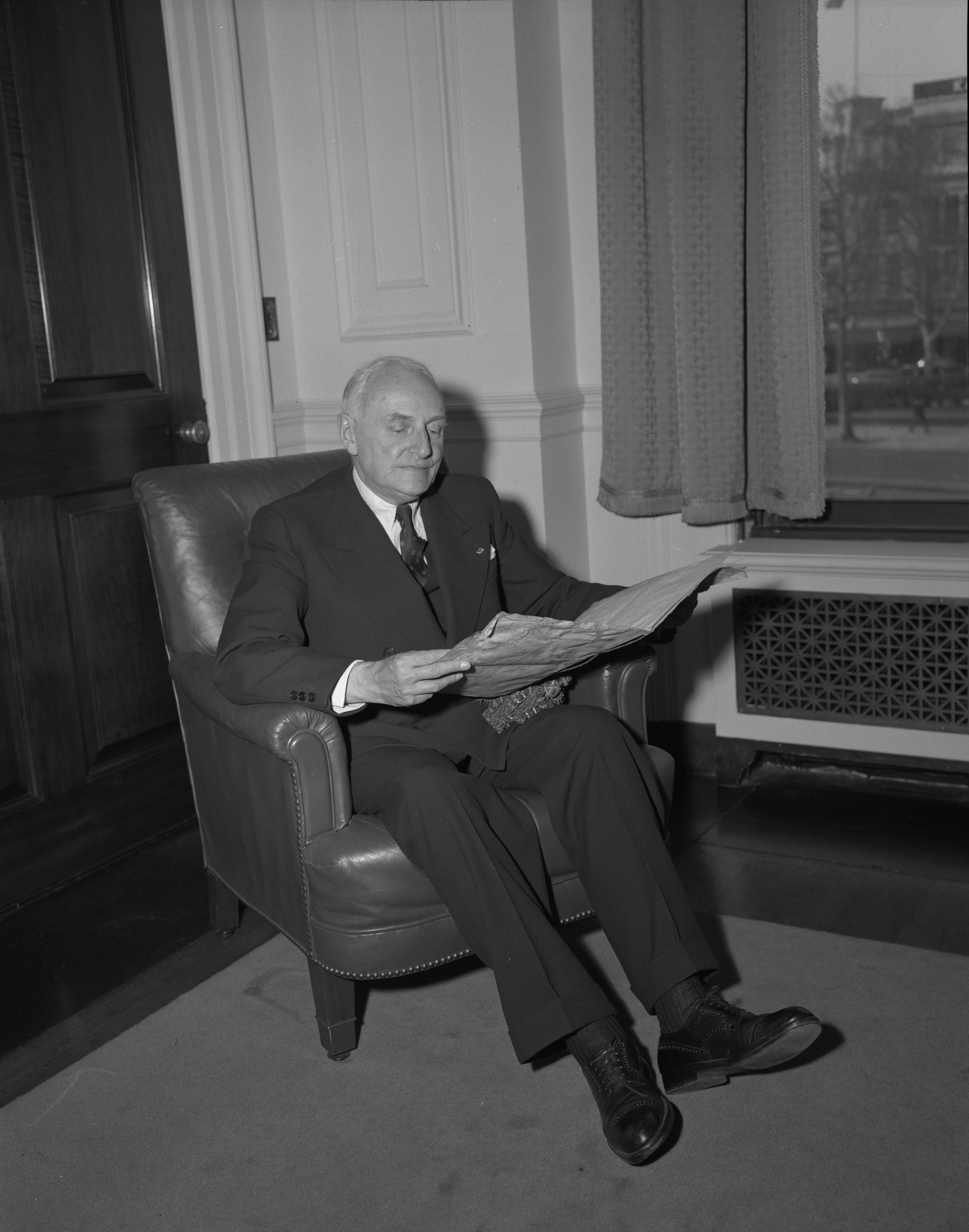

After qualifying as an archivist from the École Nationale des Chartes in 1914, he served as head of the archive and library service of the French navy ("Chef du service des archives et bibliothèques de la Marine") from 1919 to 1944. While in this post, he found time to write a number of fiction and non-fiction books, and his novel Le roi dort won the Prix Renaudot in 1933.

He was Director of the National Archives of France from 1948 to 1959, and President of the International Council on Archives from 1950 to 1954.

In retirement he wrote some further non-fiction books, including Félix Faure à l’Élysée (1963) and Histoire de la Tour Eiffel (1964).

== See also ==
- List of archivists
