= Grand prix de la Critique littéraire =

The grand prix de la Critique littéraire was created in 1948 by Robert André. It is awarded each year by the French PEN club to a literary essay. Chaired by Joël Schmidt, its jury is now made up of Jean Blot, Jean-Luc Despax, Jean-Claude Lamy, Daniel Leuwers, Jean Orizet, Laurence Paton (general secretary), Antoine Spire and Patrick Tudoret. Since its creation, it has rewarded many leading authors and intends to promote a literary criticism of quality and, quite simply, literature.

== List of laureates ==
- 2019: Judith Lyon-Caen, for La griffe du temps (Gallimard)
- 2018: Patrick Mimouni, for Les mémoires maudites : Juifs et homosexuels dans l’œuvre et la vie de Marcel Proust (Grasset)
- 2017: Lakis Proguidis, for Rabelais, que le roman commence (Editions Pierre-Guillaume de Roux)
- 2016: Béatrice Commengé, for Une vie de paysages (Editions Verdier)
- 2015: Pierre Boncenne, for Le Parapluie de Simon Ley, Philippe Rey
- 2014: Paul Audi, for Qui témoignera pour nous ? Albert Camus, face à lui-même, Verdier
- 2013: Violaine Gelly and Paul Gradvohl, for Charlotte Delbo, Fayard
- 2012: Jean-Christian Petitfils for Le Frémissement de la grâce, Le roman du Grand Meaulnes, Fayard
- 2011: Nicolas Grimaldi for Les Métamorphoses de l'Amour, Éditions Grasset
- 2010: Claire Blandin for Le Figaro littéraire, Vie d'un hebdomadaire politique et culturel : 1946–1971 (Nouveau Monde Éditions)
- 2009: Patrick Tudoret for L'Écrivain sacrifié, vie et mort de l’émission littéraire (INA/Le Bord-de-l'Eau)
- 2008: Lionel Ray for Le Procès de la vieille dame, La Différence
- 2007: Élisabeth Badinter for lifetime achievement
- 2006: Jean-Pierre Martin for Le Livre des hontes, Éditions du Seuil
- 2005: Serge Koster for Michel Tournier ou le choix du roman, Zulma
- 2004: Laurent Greilsamer for L'Éclair au front : la vie de René Char, Hachette
- 2003: Michel Décaudin for lifetime achievement
- 2002: Jean-Philippe Domecq for Qui a peur de la littérature ?, Mille et Une nuits
- 2001: Marie-Claire Bancquart for Fin de siècle gourmande
- 2000: Marc Petit for Éloge de la fiction, Fayard
- 1999: Claude Dulong, member of the Institut
- 1998: Vénus Khoury-Ghata
- 1997: Pierre Moinot, of the Académie française
- 1996: Diane de Margerie
- 1995: Ghislain de Diesbach
- 1994: Jean-Louis Curtis, of the Académie française
- 1993: Jacqueline de Romilly, of the Académie française
- 1992: René de Obaldia of the Académie française
- 1990: Michel Drouin
- 1989: not attributed
- 1988: Claude Roy
- 1987: Gorges Lubin
- 1986: Jean Blot, for Ivan Gontcharov ou le réalisme impossible, L'Âge d'Homme
- 1985: Roger Kempf for Dandies, Baudelaire et Cie, Grasset
- 1984: Henri Troyat, of the Académie française, for Tchekhov, Flammarion
- 1983: Béatrice Didier
- 1979: Jacques Catteau, for La Création littéraire chez Dostoïevski
- 1976: Philippe Lejeune for Lire Leiris : Autobiographie et langage, Klincksieck
- 1974: José Cabanis, of the Académie française, Saint-Simon l’admirable, Éditions Gallimard
- 1970: Michel Mohrt, of the Académie française, for L'Air du large
- 1960: Michel Butor for Répertoire 1, Éditions de Minuit
- 1952: Georges Poulet for La Distance intérieure, Plon
