= Brasserie Lipp =

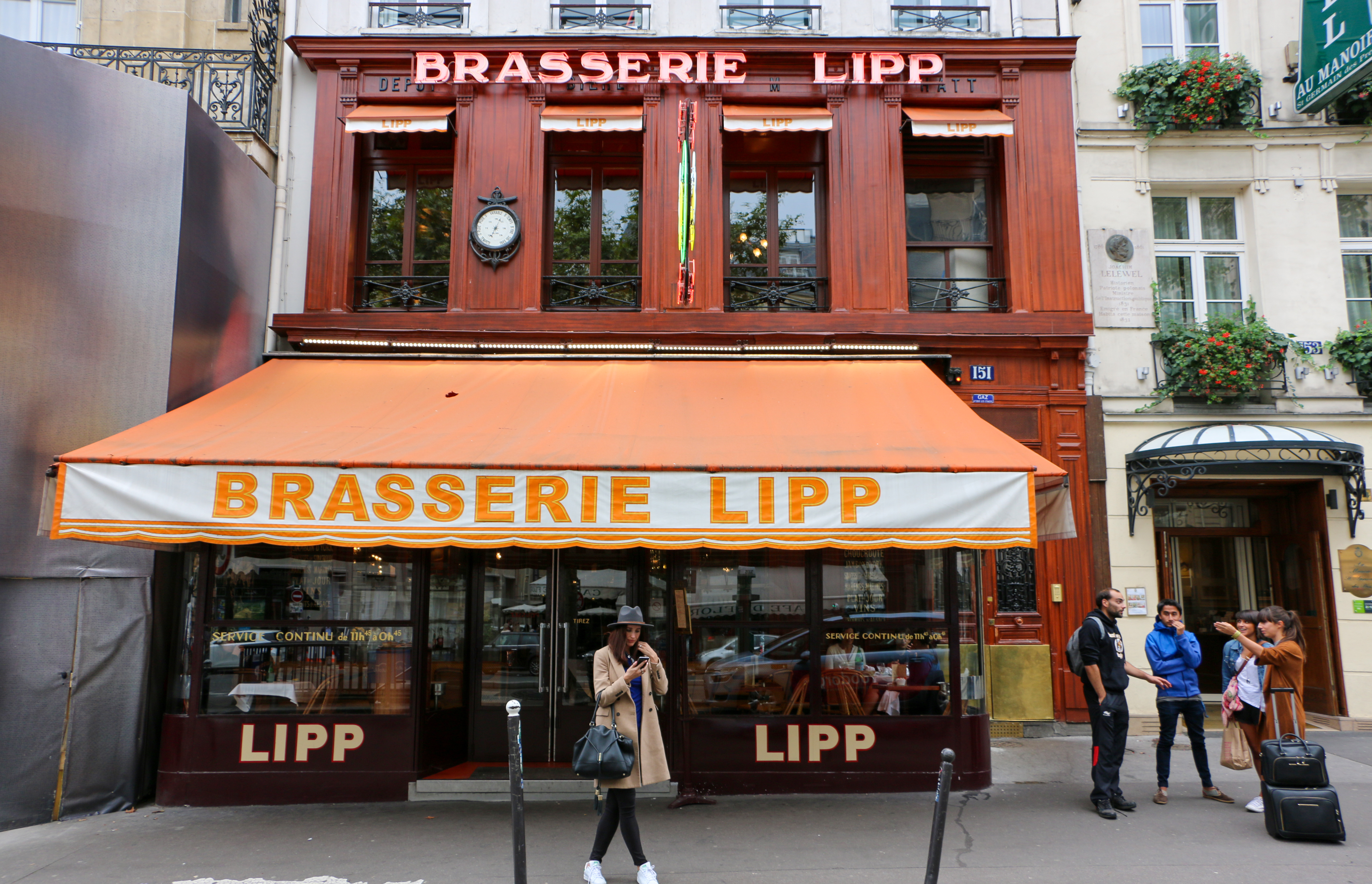

- Location in Paris

Restaurant information
- Established: 27 October 1880; 145 years ago
- Owner: Groupe Bertrand
- Location: 151 Boulevard Saint-Germain, Paris, France
- Coordinates: 48.854122°N 2.332628°E
- Website: brasserielipp.fr

Brasserie Lipp is a brasserie located at 151 Boulevard Saint-Germain in the 6th arrondissement of Paris. It sponsors an annual literary prize, the Prix Cazes, named for a previous owner.

== History ==
On 27 October 1880, Léonard Lipp and his wife Pétronille opened the brasserie on the Boulevard Saint-Germain. Their speciality was a cervelat rémoulade starter, then choucroute garnie, served with the finest beers. The brasserie's atmosphere and its modest prices made it a great success. Anti-German sentiment during the First World War led to a change of name to Brasserie des Bords for several years. Of Alsatian origin, Lipp left Alsace when it became part of Germany.

In July 1920, the bougnat (Paris immigrant) Marcellin Cazes redesigned the brasserie, which had become frequented by poets such as Paul Verlaine and Guillaume Apollinaire. He decorated it with tiled murals by Léon Fargues, with painted ceilings by Charly Garrey, and purple moleskin seating. In 1955, Cazes passed the baton to his son Roger.

On 29 October 1965, Mehdi Ben Barka, a Moroccan anti-monarchist politician opposed to King Hassan II, was abducted by the Moroccan Secret Service in front of the brasserie, probably with the help of the French. The 'Ben Barka Affair' became a political scandal which fundamentally changed France–Morocco relations.

Since 1990, the brasserie has been progressively developed by the Bertrand family of Auvergne, owners of the Angelina tea house, of fast food chain Bert's, and of the Sir Winston pub chain.

== Prix Cazes ==
In 1935, then innkeeper Marcellin Cazes established the Prix Cazes, a literary prize awarded each year to an author who has won no other literary prize. Up to the present day, the prize is advertised by the Lipp.

Recipients

- 1935: The theatre company Rideau de Paris of Marcel Herrand and Jean Marchat for their adaptations of Coup de Trafalgar (Roger Vitrac) and L'Homme blanc (André de Richaud)
- 1936: Pierre Albert-Birot, Grabinoulor
- 1937: Thyde Monnier, La Rue courte
- 1938: Kléber Haedens, L'École des parents
- 1939: Marius Richard, Jeanne qui s'en alla
- 1940: André Cayatte, Le Traquenard
- 1942: Albert Paraz, Le Roi tout nu
- 1943: Jean Proal, Où souffle la lombarde
- 1944: Pierre Tisseyre, Cinquante-Cinq Heures de guerre
- 1946: Three prizes: those deferred from 1941 and 1945, and for 1946 itself:
1. Jean-Louis Curtis, Les Jeunes Hommes
2. Olivier Séchan, Les Chemins de nulle part
3. Jean Prugnot, Béton armé
- 1947: Florian Le Roy, L'Oiseau volage
- 1948:
1. André Favier, Confession sans grandeur
2. Pierre Humbourg, Le Bar de minuit passé
- 1949: François Raynal, Marie des solitudes, Borée
- 1950: Marcel Schneider, Le Chasseur vert,
- 1951: Bertrand Defos, Le Compagnon de route
- 1952: Henry Muller, Six Pas en arrière, La Table ronde
- 1953: Ladislas Dormandi, Pas si fou, Clouzot
- 1954: Hélène Bessette, Lily pleure
- 1955: Albert Vidalie, Les Bijoutiers du clair de lune, Denoël
- 1956: Georges Bayle, Le Pompiste et le Chauffeur
- 1957: Yves Grosrichard, La Compagne de l'homme
- 1958: André Guilbert, Deux Doigts de terre
- 1959: Jacques Peuchmaurd, Le Plein Été
- 1960: Monique Lange, Les Platanes, Gallimard
- 1961:
1. Solange Fasquelle, Le Congrès d'Aix
2. Henry Dory, La Nuit de la Passion
- 1962: Ghislain de Diesbach, Un joli train de vie, Éditions R. Julliard, Paris, 1962
- 1963: Francis Huré, Le Consulat du Pacifique
- 1964: Luc Bérimont, Le Bois Cattiau
- 1965: René Sussan, Histoire de Farezi, Denoël
- 1966: Georges Elgozy, Le Paradoxe des technocrates, Denoël
- 1967: Marie-Claude Sandrin, La Forteresse de boue, Buchet-Chastel
- 1968: Walter Lewino, L'Éclat et la Blancheur, Albin Michel
- 1969: Jacques Baron, L'An I du surréalisme, Denoël
- 1970: Michel de Grèce, Ma sœur l'Histoire ne vois-tu rien venir?
- 1971: José Luis de Vilallonga, Fiesta
- 1972: Suzanne Prou, Méchamment les oiseaux, Calmann-Lévy.
- 1973: Claude Menuet, Une enfance ordinaire
- 1974: François de Closets, Le Bonheur en plus, Denoël
- 1975: Jean-Marie Fonteneau, Phénix, Grasset
- 1976: Jean Chalon, Portrait d'une séductrice, Stock
- 1977: Éric Ollivier, Panne sèche, Denoël
- 1978: Jacques d'Arribehaude, Adieu Néri
- 1979: François Cavanna, Les Ritals, Belfond
- 1980: Guy Lagorce, Les Héroïques, Julliard
- 1981: Olivier Todd, Le Fils rebelle, Grasset
- 1982: Jean Blot, Gris du Ciel, Gallimard
- 1983: Edgar Faure, Avoir toujours raison... c'est un grand tort, Plon
- 1984: Dominique Desanti, Les Clés d'Elsa, Ramsay
- 1985: Jean-Paul Aron, Les Modernes, Gallimard
- 1986: Xavier de la Fournière, Louise Michel, Perrin
- 1987: Joël Schmidt, Lutèce, Perrin
- 1988: Ya Ding, Le Sorgho rouge, Retz
- 1989: Jean Hamburger, Monsieur Littré, Flammarion
- 1990: Jean-Jacques Lafaye, L'Avenir de la nostalgie, une vie de Stefan Zweig, Le Félin
- 1991: Pierre Sipriot, Montherlant sans masque, Rober Laffont
- 1992: Élisabeth Gille, Le Mirador, Presses de la Renaissance.
- 1993: Jean Prasteau, Les Grandes Heures du faubourg St-Germain, Perrin
- 1994: Michel Melot, L'Écriture de Samos, Albin Michel
- 1995: Jean Marin, Petit Bois pour un grand feu, Fayard,
- 1996: Gilles Lapouge, L'Incendie de Copenhague, Albin Michel
- 1997: Jean-Paul Enthoven, Les Enfants de Saturne, Grasset
- 1998: Clémence de Biéville, Le Meilleur des Mariages, Denoël
- 1999: Michel Chaillou, La France fugitive, Fayard
- 2000: Shan Sa, Les quatre vies du Saule, Grasset.
- 2001: Marcel Jullian, Mémoire buissonière, Albin Michel.
- 2002: Gérard de Cortanze, Une chambre à Turin, Le Rocher
- 2003: Jean-Claude Lamy, Mac Orlan, l'aventurier immobile, Albin Michel
- 2004: Béatrice Commengé, Et il ne pleut jamais, naturellement, Gallimard
- 2004: Georges Suffert, Le Pape et l'Empereur, de Falloi
- 2005: Françoise Hamel, Fille de France, Plon
- 2006: Emmanuelle Loyer, Paris à New York : Intellectuels et artistes français en exil (1940-1947), Grasset
- 2007: Richard Millet, Dévorations, Gallimard
- 2008: Claude Delay, Giacometti Alberto et Diego, Fayard
- 2009: Françoise Wagener, Je suis née inconsolable : Louise de Vilmorin (1902-1969), Albin Michel
- 2010: Christian Giudicelli, Square de la Couronne, Gallimard
- 2011: Patricia Reznikov, La nuit n'éclaire pas tout, Albin Michel
- 2012: Nicolas d'Estienne d'Orves, Les Fidélités successives, Albin Michel.
- 2013: Diane de Margerie, for Éclats d'insomnie, Grasset
- 2014: Robert Sabatier, for Je vous quitte en vous embrassant bien fort, Albin Michel
- 2015: Gabriel Matzneff, for La Lettre au capitaine Brunner, La Table Ronde
- 2016: Dominique Paravel, for Giratoire, Serge Safran.
- 2017: Éric Neuhoff, for Costa Brava, Albin Michel
- 2018: Régis Wargnier, for Les prix d'excellence, Grasset
- 2019: Louis-Henri de La Rochefoucauld, for La Prophétie de John Lennon, Stock
- 2020: Alexandre Postel, for Un automne de Flaubert, Gallimard
- 2022:
1. Gautier Battistella, for Chef, Grasset
2. Mathilde Brézet, for Le Grand monde de Proust, Grasset
- 2023: Marie Charrel, for Les Mangeurs de Nuit, Éditions de l'Observatoire

== In culture ==
The writer Pierre Bourgeade (1927–2009) wrote several pieces with the brasserie as the setting:

- Bourgeade, Pierre (January 1997). "La Perleuse". Cybersex et autres nouvelles. Paris: Blanche. pp. 93–94. ISBN 2-911621-09-3.
- "Histoire de Chimène" [History of Jimena Díaz]. Senso (in French). No. 13. illustrated by Christine Lesueur. March–April 2004. pp. I–VIII. ISSN 1630-6775.
- "Chimène chez Lipp (extract from Éloge des fétichistes), Tristram, 2009)". Les Lettres Françaises. New Series (58): XVI. April 2009. (Supplement in L'Humanité, 4 April 2009. ISSN 0242-6870)
- Diwo, Jean (1981). Chez Lipp. Denoël., a history of the brasserie.
- In Woody Allen's movie Midnight in Paris, Owen Wilson's character Gil mentions Brasserie Lipp in a passing remark.
- Featured prominently in Ernest Hemingway's 1964 memoir A Moveable Feast.
- Featured in many Stone Barrington novels by Stuart Woods, including Treason. Putnam. 2020. pp. 54–55. ISBN 9780593083192.
