= Pléneuf-Val-André =

Pléneuf-Val-André Pleneg-Nantraezh
- Commune
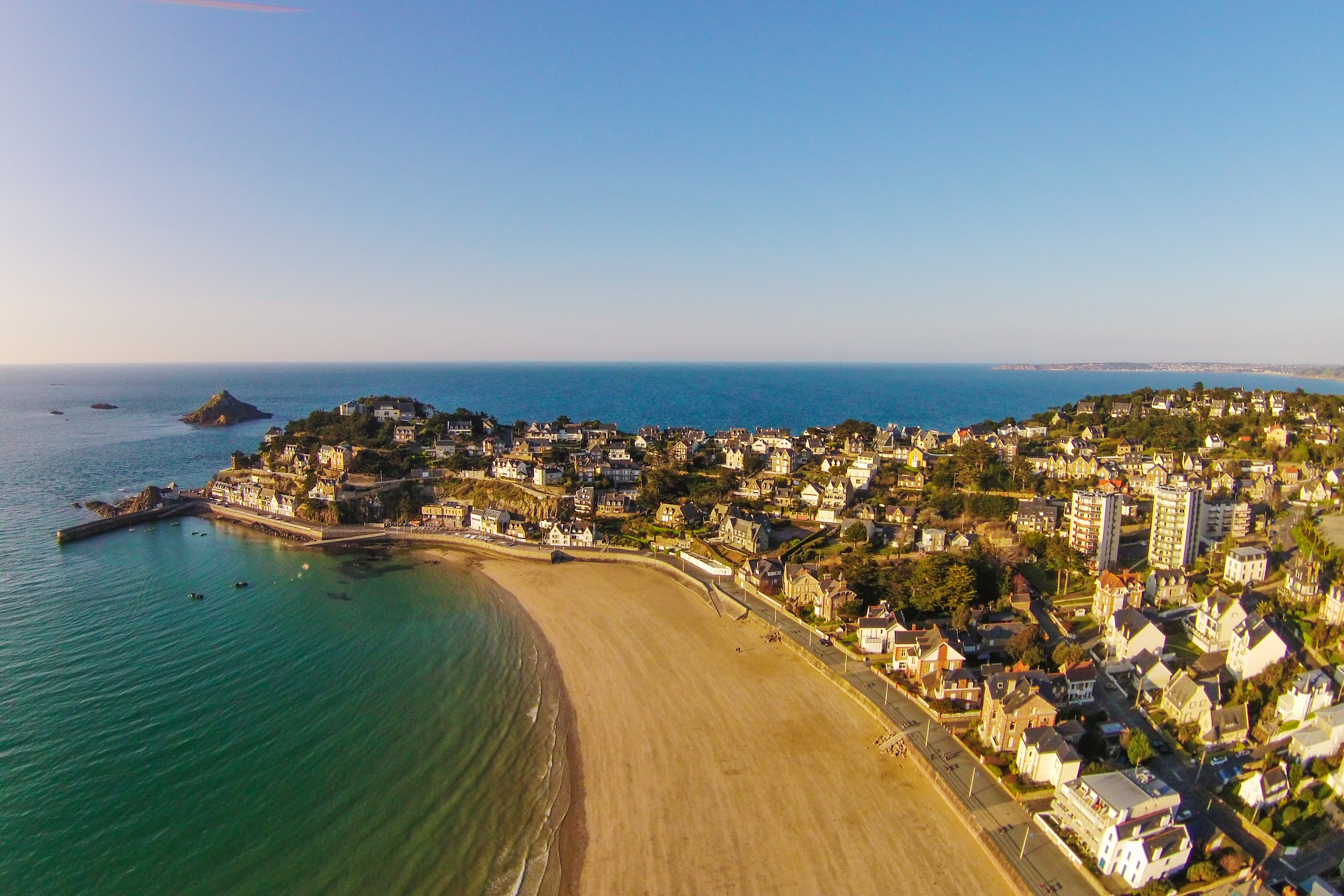
- Aerial view of Le Val-André

- Coat of arms
- Location of Pléneuf-Val-André
- Location within France Location within Brittany
- Coordinates: 48°35′30″N 2°32′49″W
- Country: France
- Region: Brittany
- Department: Côtes-d'Armor
- Arrondissement: Saint-Brieuc
- Canton: Pléneuf-Val-André
- Intercommunality: CA Lamballe Terre et Mer

Government
  - Mayor (2020–2026): Pierre-Alexis Blévin
- Area^{1}: 17.07 km^{2} (6.59 sq mi)
- Highest elevation: 117 m (384 ft)
- Lowest elevation: 0 m (0 ft)
- Population (2023): 3,988
  - Density: 233.6/km^{2} (605.1/sq mi)
- Time zone: UTC+01:00 (CET)
  - Summer (DST): UTC+02:00 (CEST)
- INSEE/Postal code: 22186 /22370
- ^{1} French Land Register data, which excludes lakes, ponds, glaciers > 1 km^{2} (0.386 sq mi or 247 acres) and river estuaries.

Pléneuf-Val-André (French pronunciation: [plenœf val ɑ̃dʁe]; Breton: Pleneg-Nantraezh; Gallo: Ploenoec) is a commune in the Côtes-d'Armor department of Brittany in northwestern France. The writer Florian Le Roy (1901–1959), winner of the 1947 Prix Cazes was born in Pléneuf-Val-André and the journalist Yves Grosrichard (1907–1992) died there too.

== Geography ==
Pléneuf-Val-André lies 25 km east of Saint-Brieuc and 13 km north of Lamballe.

== Population ==
People from Pléneuf-Val-André are called pléneuviens or valandréens in French.

Historical population
Year	Pop.	±% p.a.
1968	3,651	—
1975	3,654	+0.01%
1982	3,591	−0.25%
1990	3,600	+0.03%
1999	3,680	+0.24%
2007	3,957	+0.91%
2012	4,063	+0.53%
2017	4,073	+0.05%
2023	3,988	−0.35%
Source: INSEE

== Notable people ==
- Félix Gautier, port master of Dahouët, Knight of the Legion of Honor and his son François Gautier (1832-1918), shipowner, builder of the Pourquoi-Pas?, close friend of Charcot.
- Léonard Victor Charner (1797-1869), Admiral of France: in 1857 he built a manor house with chapel and guardhouse on land then close to the dunes but which would later be in the heart of Val-André. One of the main streets bears his name and its heritage became, by purchase in 1954, the Admiralty Park.
- The poet Jean Richepin (1849-1926) built the villa La Carrière and is buried in the commune. The public college of Pléneuf bears his name.
- Frédéric Henri Le Normand de Lourmel (1811-1854), brigadier general, fell in front of Sébastopol on 5 November 1854 and was buried on 20 December in the cemetery of Pléneuf.
- Joseph Édouard de La Motte-Rouge (1804-1883), general, born in the Bellevue house located in the village.
- Philippe Gavi, co-founder of the newspaper Liberation with Jean-Paul Sartre and Serge July.
- Pierre-Yvon Lenoir (1936-2015), French athlete, died in the town.
- Charlotte Valandrey (1968-2022), actress, chose her pseudonym in reference to the town, and is buried there.
- Fabrice Jeandesboz, professional cyclist.
- Patrick de Gmeline, military historian, laureate of the French Academy.
- Gustave Téry, journalist, founder of the newspaper L'Œuvre (buried in the commune).
- Raoul Ponchon, writer, poet, member of the Goncourt Academy (buried in the commune).
- André Cornu (politician), Secretary of State (buried in the commune).
- Simone Gallimard, French publisher (buried in the commune).

== See also ==
- Communes of the Côtes-d'Armor department

== Gallery ==
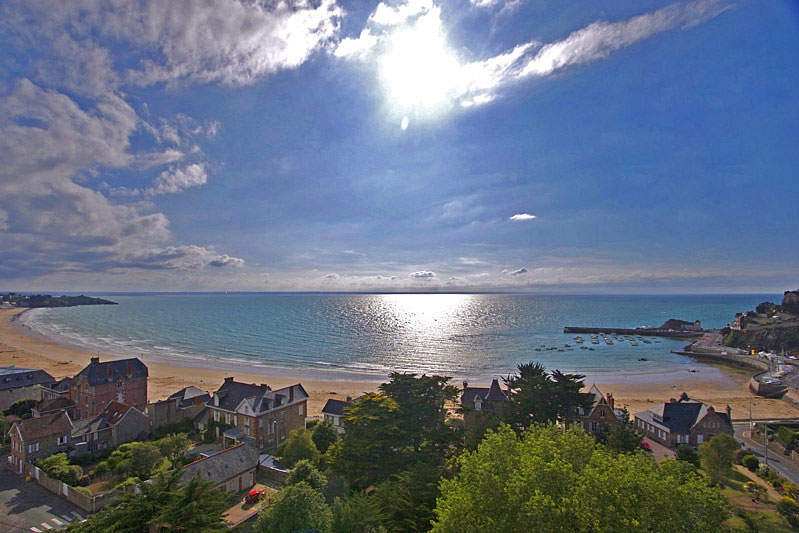
Val-André, wide-angle view

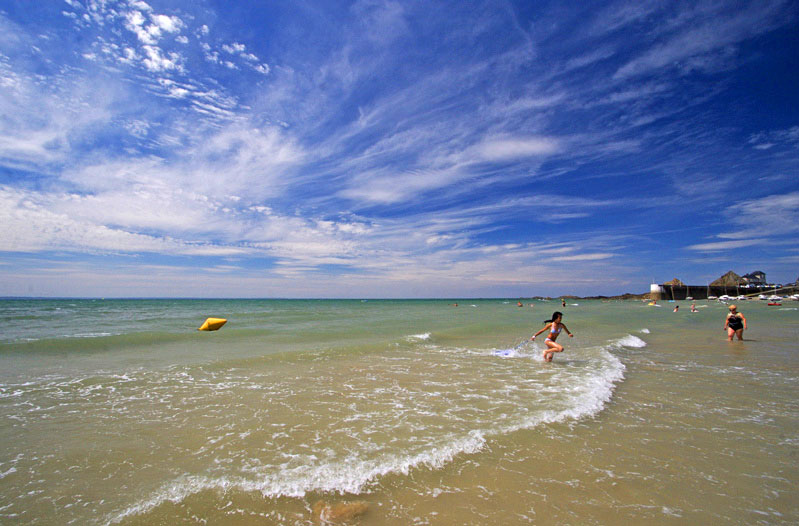
Val-André, the beach and harbour

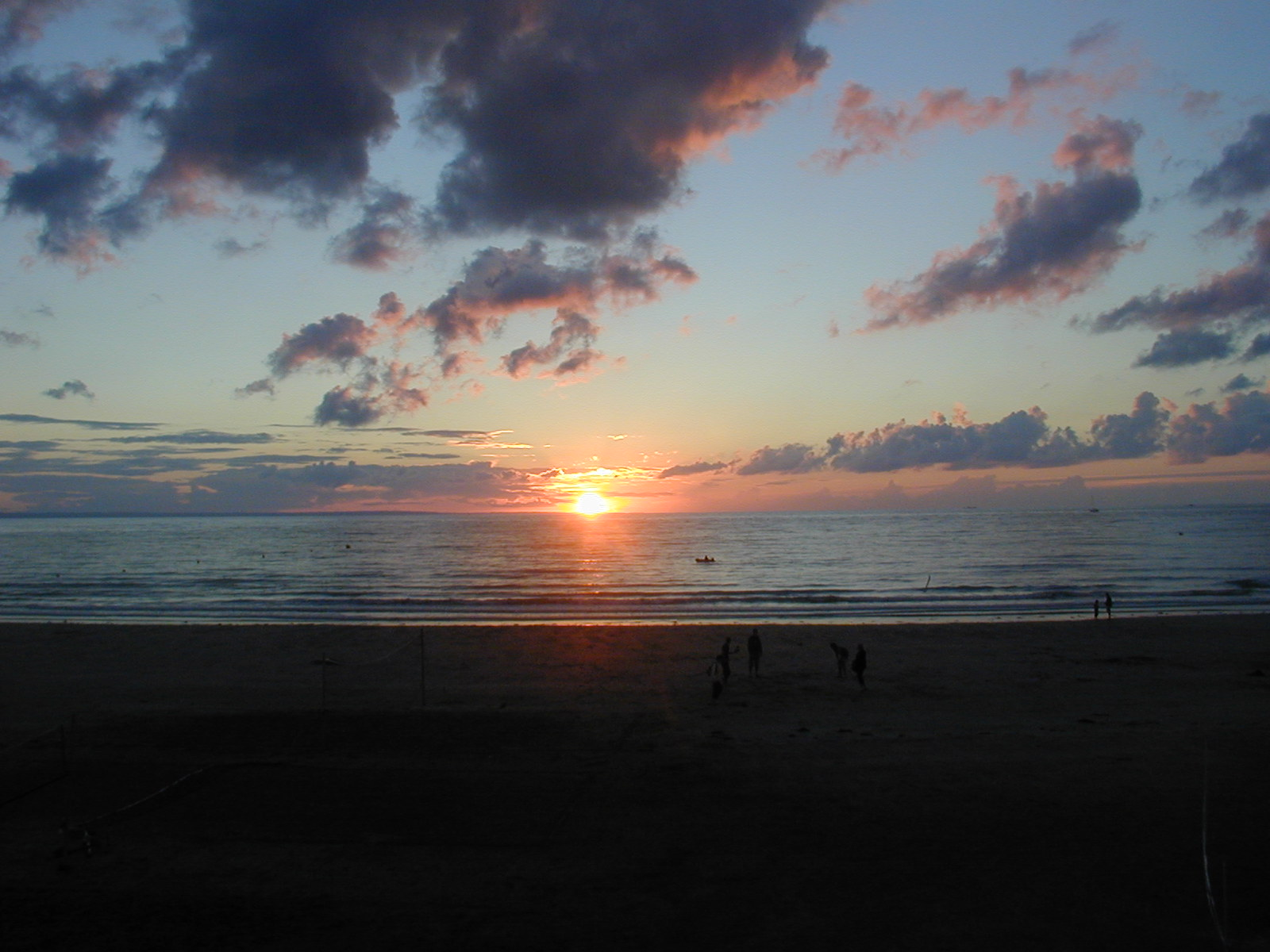
Sunset at the beach of Val-André

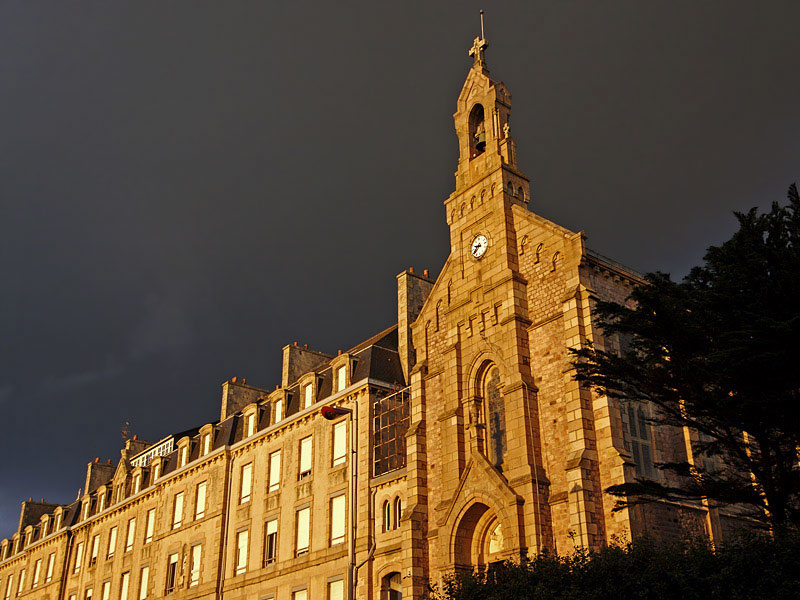
Val-André, the chapel
