= Anne Plantagenet =

Anne Plantagenet may refer to:

- Anne of Gloucester (1383–1438), Countess of Stafford
- Anne of York (daughter of Edward IV) (1475–1511)
- Anne Plantagenet (writer) (born 1972), French novelist and translator
- Anne Plantagenet, Duchess of Exeter (1439–1476)
