= Sandrin (surname) =

Sandrin is a surname. Notable people with the surname include:

- Albert Sandrin Jr., American chess player
- Daniel Sandrin (Lee Dong-jun), American-born South Korean basketball player
- Eric Sandrin (Lee Seung-jun), American-born South Korean basketball player
- Hermance Sandrin (Hermance Lesguillon), French poet and novelist
- Marie-Claude Sandrin, French writer
