= André Girard =

André Girard may refer to:

- André Girard (1901–1968), French resistance worker and artist, leader of the CARTE network
- André Girard (1909–1993), French resistance worker, member of the ALLIANCE network

== See also ==
- André Gérard, French football player and manager
