= The Black March =

1956 autobiography

The Black March (ISBN 0-553-20125-5) is an autobiography of a SS man published by Bantam Books. The book is a collection of key entries in the journal of Peter Neumann, a boy inducted from the Hitler Youth into the Schutzstaffel.

== Publishing dates ==
First edition (French)

- 1956 - Éditions France-Empire; first published edition, in French; Title: SS!
- 1958 - Weidenfeld & Nicolson Ltd; English translation by Constantine Fitzgibbon; Title:Other Men's Graves: Diary of an SS Man
- 1959 - William Sloane Associates; First US printing; Title: The Black March: The Personal Story of an SS Man
- 1960, 1967 - Bantam; Title: The Black March: The Personal Story of an SS Man

== Synopsis ==
The journal of Peter Neumann is presented in chronological order: it begins in 1939 with various entries of his activities in the Hitler youth, and discussing plans with his friends to enter the SS. Peter's early entries are more jubilant and optimistic.

He recounts his cruel training involving many life-or-death exercises, e.g., outrunning attack dogs, having to dig a fox hole before a tank rolls over him and the other men in training. He tells of how a few men died in such exercises. Peter's girlfriend reveals that she is a Jew; this, however, does not affect Peter negatively.

During the middle of his entries he regards his duties with admiration and disdain for his commanding officers. Peter is, in one entry, awarded the Iron Cross second class for saving the lives of several battalions from a sniper's nest (who were also armed with RPGs).

In later entries, he tells of fierce combat in Russia, the most notable being a tale from a Russian civilian, in an occupied town, telling Peter and his fellow soldiers of the partisans of Odessa and the Russian genocide at the hands of the Nazis.

Towards the end, Peter returns home on leave where he informs his friend's parents of their son's death, and on a visit to his home Peter is informed that his girlfriend has been moved to a ghetto. On visiting her he expresses sympathy for her condition but writes that he couldn't care less about other Jews in the same situation. He also talks with two concentration camp technicians at a bar, who tell him of their grisly job fixing incinerators.

At the end, Peter and his unit are on the retreat. Peter, at this point, has been promoted to captain and expresses extreme discontent with both the SS and with the many civilians who are blaming the SS for aggravating the Russian troops. He hears many tales of Russian cruelty. At the end, Peter is trapped, alone and wounded, and surrounded by Russian troops. He hides in a small room filled with dead German soldiers and fires a damaged gun at a Russian 'clean-up' squad. The bullet he intends for himself does not do the job. His last words are "Why couldn't they have killed me?"

== Additional notes ==
The book does not state explicitly whether Peter Neumann was captured, killed, or if he escaped. His last entry is somewhat long given the amount of time he had before the Russian troops could have reached him, and he could have disguised himself as a dead soldier. However, the final page of the book references being captured by the Soviet Army and being sent to Warsaw and working as a camp prisoner helping in the clean-up of the ruins left by the war. The final page mentions the "sneering brutality of the Soviet Guards".

Some have disputed the authenticity of Neumann's journal since its publication; some claiming it to have been the work of a ghost writer and therefore not autobiographical, and others claiming it to be a work of fiction. Peter Neumann's extraordinary tale has, nevertheless, held up very well under extensive examination in terms of historical accuracy by a number of sources since its publication.

It is also reported that French publisher Éditions France-Empire claimed that Peter Neumann's family (from whom they received the journal) specifically wanted the work kept intact—as he wrote it during the war—and that the family had not revised or altered the text before giving it to the publishers.

== See also ==
- Nazi
- Schutzstaffel
- The Holocaust
