= Jean Orizet =

French writer and literary critic (1937–2026)

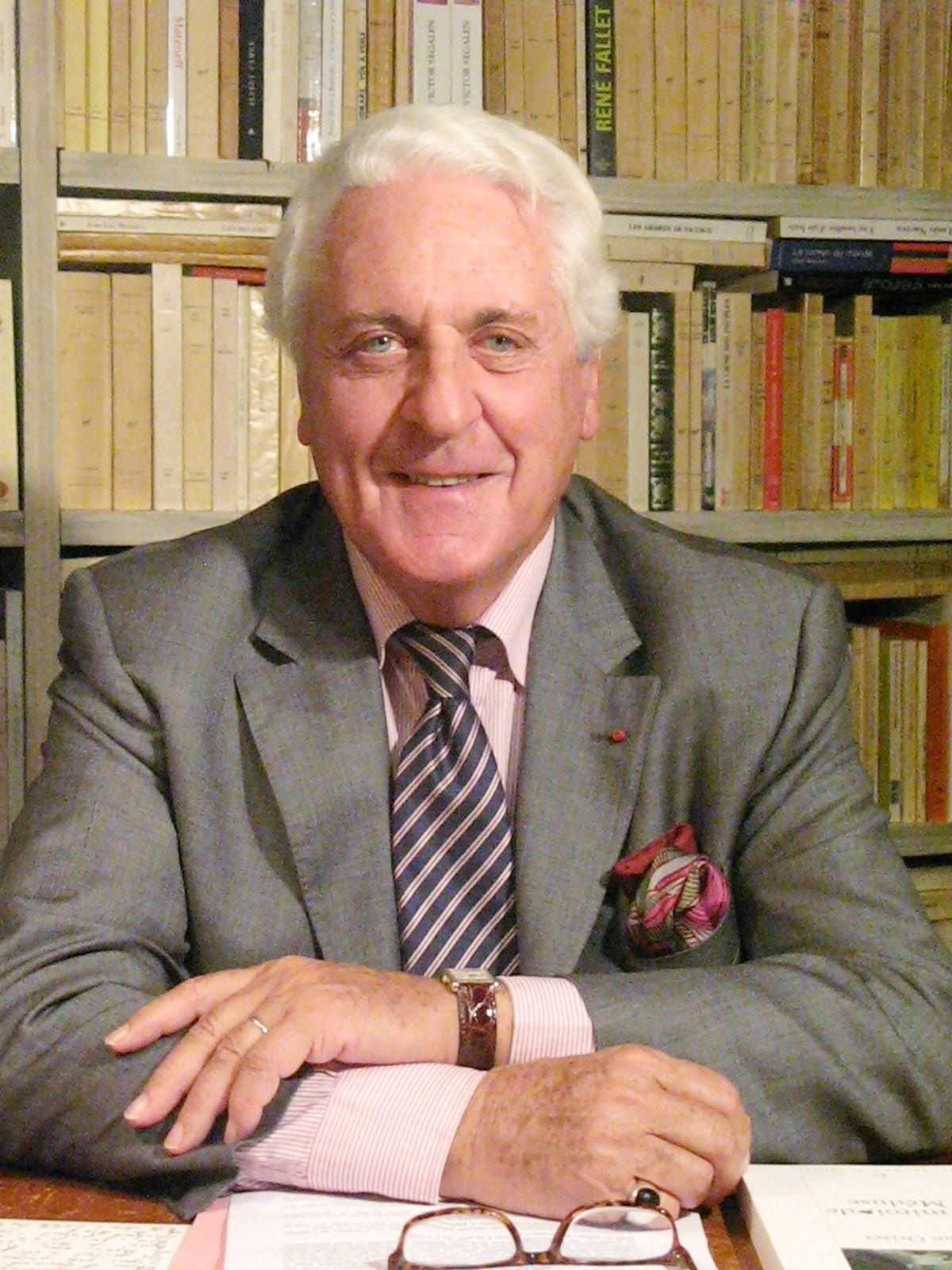
- Orizet in 2009

President of the Association des écrivains combattants
- In office 5 April 2011 – 30 January 2025
- Preceded by: Michel Tauriac
- Succeeded by: Alfred Gilder

President of the PEN Club français
- In office 1993–1999
- Preceded by: Solange Fasquelle
- Succeeded by: Jean Blot

Personal details
- Born: 5 March 1937 Marseille, France
- Died: 16 September 2026 (aged 89)
- Education: Sciences Po
- Occupation: Writer; Literary critic

Jean Orizet (French: [ʒˈɑ̃ ˈɒɹɪzɪt]; 5 March 1937 – 16 September 2026) was a French writer and literary critic.

A graduate of the Sciences Po, he won numerous awards such as the Prix Marie Noël in 1967, the Grand Prix de Poésie in 1991, and the Prix Méditerranée in 2015.

Orizet died on 16 September 2026, at the age of 89.

== Distinctions ==
- Commander of the Ordre des Arts et des Lettres (1994)
- Officer of the Ordre national du Mérite (2000)
- Commander of the Legion of Honour (2013)

== Works ==
- Errance (1962)
- L’Horloge de vie (1966)
- Miroir oblique (1969)
- Silencieuse entrave au temps (1972)
- Dupont le poète (1972)
- En soi le chaos : poésie 1960-1974 (1975)
- Poèmes cueillis dans la prairie (1978)
- Niveaux de survie (1978)
- Le Voyageur absent (1982)
- Dits d’un monde en miettes (1982)
- Schneider (1984)
- Histoire de l'entretemps (1985)
- La Peau du monde (1987)
- Poèmes, 1974-1989 (1990)
- L’Épaule du cavalier (1991)
- Le Miroir de Méduse (1994)
- Hommes continuels (1994)
- La Poussière d’Adam (1997)
- La Vie autrement (1998)
- Les Aventures du regard (1999)
- Entretiens avec Claude Mourthé, À voix nue (2000)
- Réédition Errance (2001)
- L’Homme fragile (2002)
- Lettre à Claude Érignac, l’ami assassiné (2003)
- La Peau bleue des rêves (2003)
- Jean-Marc Brunet (2003)
- Le Voyageur de l’entretemps (2004)
- L’Entretemps, brèves histoires de l’art (2005)
- La Cendre et l’étoile (2005)
- L’Attrapeur de rêves (2006)
- Le Regard et l’Énigme. Œuvre poétique 1958-2008 (2008)
- Cuisine-moi des étoiles (2009)
- Kâma Sutra (2009)
- Yves Piaget, orfèvre du temps, dialogues avec Jean Orizet (2010)
- Les Forêts de l'impossible (2011)
- Mémoires d'entretemps (2012)
