= Asterix and the Chieftain's Shield =

Comic book album

Asterix and the Chieftain's Shield (Le bouclier arverne)
- Date: 1977
- Series: Asterix

Creative team
- Writers: René Goscinny
- Artists: Albert Uderzo

Original publication
- Date of publication: 1967
- Language: French

Chronology
- Preceded by: Asterix the Legionary
- Followed by: Asterix at the Olympic Games

Asterix and the Chieftain's Shield (French: Le bouclier arverne, "The Arvernian Shield") is the eleventh volume in the Asterix comic book series, written by René Goscinny and drawn by Albert Uderzo. It was originally published as a serial in Pilote issues 399–421 in 1967.

The book is inspired by the battle of Alesia, where the Gaulish warrior chief Vercingetorix surrendered to Julius Caesar. However, only the very end of the actual battle appears in the book – the main plot concerns what happened after the battle.

This episode, like Asterix and the Cauldron, is plotted like a detective novel, with a mystery to be solved at the very end.

== Plot summary ==
The book begins with Vercingetorix conceding defeat to Julius Caesar. His surrendered weapons remain at Caesar's chair for several hours, until a Roman archer steals Vercingetorix's famous shield, which he loses in a game of dice to another legionary, who then loses it to a drunken centurion, in return for the centurion not reporting him for a military offence. The centurion himself uses the shield to pay for a jar of wine at a nearby Gaulish inn; later, the shield is given by the innkeeper to a survivor of the Battle of Alesia.

Following this prologue, Chief Vitalstatistix is made helpless by a sore liver, a consequence of overeating and drinking at his last banquet. Having demonstrated this, and temporarily eased the chief's pain, the druid Getafix sends Vitalstatistix to a hydrotherapeutic center in Arverne to be cured, with Asterix and Obelix (and Dogmatix) as his escort. On the way, they stop at various inns, where the heavy food revives the chief's sickness. At Arverne, the Gauls initially remain together; but because Asterix, Obelix, and Dogmatix are in no need of special diets, they feast on wild boar and beer while everyone else eats "boiled vegetables". When other patients complain, Vitalstatistix sends Asterix, Obelix, and Dogmatix to Gergovia.

Along the way, the Gauls are offended by Roman envoy Noxius Vapus, and vanquish his guards. In the aftermath, Asterix, Obelix, and Dogmatix befriend the local tavern-keeper Winesanspirix, who retains them thereafter as guests. When Noxius Vapus makes his report to Caesar in Rome, Caesar plans a triumph on Vercingetorix's shield to "show them who's boss", and orders Vapus to search Arverne for it. When the initial investigations fail, the Romans send a spy, Legionary Pusillanimus; but on drinking too much wine at Winesanspirix's tavern, the latter discloses Caesar's plan and reveals his own knowledge of the shield's history, whereupon Asterix, Obelix, and Dogmatix set off in search of the shield themselves. To that end, they interrogate the archer, Lucius Circumbendibus, who now owns a wheel manufacturing business; the second legionary, Marcus Carniverus, who worked at a health resort before opening a restaurant; and the drunken Centurion Crapulus. Vapus and his men in turn search in vain for both the shield and Asterix and Obelix, as a running gag dirtying themselves with charcoal dust while searching the coal heaps belonging to Winesanspirix and their neighbors.

The search eventually leads the two Gauls back to Winesanspirix, to whom Crapulus had given the shield in the prologue. Upon the protagonists' reunion with him, Winesanspirix confesses having given the shield to a dispirited Gaulish warrior, who is thereupon identified with the arrival of a newly cured and much slimmer Vitalstatistix. Vitalstatistix reveals he had the shield the whole time and it is the very one he is always carried upon. Upon Caesar's arrival at Gergovia, Asterix and the locals organize a triumph in which Vitalstatistix is carried on Vercingetorix's shield. Caesar then deports Vapus and his troops to Numidia, and Caesar promotes Centurion Crapulus to command of the garrison of Gergovia, and Legionary Pusillanimus to Centurion, on the grounds that they are the only "clean" legionaries present (despite both being visibly drunk). The Gauls return to their village (Vitalstatistix regaining his customary weight at the inns visited earlier in the story) to celebrate; but Vitalstatistix is forced into abstinence from the latter by his wife Impedimenta.

== Commentary ==
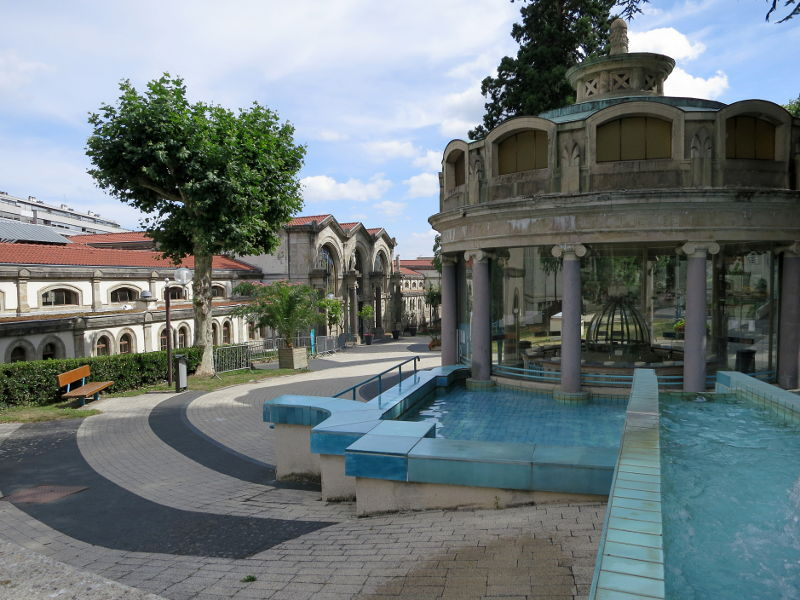
The Source Eugénie in Royat, left in the background the thermal building from the 19. century.

- A running gag in this book features Vitalstatistix and Winesanspirix falsely claiming "I don't know where Alesia is! No one knows where Alesia is!", as if ashamed at Vercingetorix's defeat. Historically, Alesia's likely location was rediscovered only after this book was published.
- The ubiquitous wine-and-coal shops in Gergovia allude to the Bougnats, Arvernian immigrants to Paris operating shops selling wine, wood, and coal.
- This book establishes the origin of Vitalstatistix's shield, on which he is customarily carried, as that of Vercingetorix.
- This is one among a minority of Asterix books wherein the bard Cacofonix is not tied up and gagged at – and actively participating in – the feast.
- This is the first album wherein Vitalstatistix's wife Impedimenta is named.
- The wheel factory is a reference to Michelin, based in Clermont-Ferrand, or the Gaulish Nemessos. In real life, the main square in Clermont-Ferrand has a statue of Vercingetorix, as opposed to the statue of Caesar in the book.
- In the wheel factory, Obelix shows a desire for business success: a theme later central to Obelix and Co.
- Though Vitalstatistix' hydrotherapy according to the comic book takes place in Aquae Calidae (modern Vichy), the first picture on page 10 alludes to the Source Eugénie and the thermal building in Royat where the Romans used the thermal springs for hydrotherapy as well.
- In the Asterix books, a map of Gaul bears the caption that 'by 50 B.C. all Gaul was occupied by the Romans'; but the historical battle of Alesia took place about the year 52 B.C. It is treated as having occurred at least 15 years before this story; thus placing Asterix in the mid-30s B.C. (though the historical Julius Caesar, a recurring character in these books, had been murdered long before).
- In Page 9, Vitalstatistix refers to 1 Timothy 5:23, regarding having a little wine for his stomach problems.
- This book serves as a loose basis for the Sega Mega Drive video game Asterix and the Power of the Gods.
- In most editions of the book, including the original French but excluding the English translation, the Arvernians talk in a dialect where they pronounce each "s" sound as "sh". This is an homage to the dialect spoken in the Auvergne region in France. This is even made fun of when an Arvernian youth pronouncing "s" normally appears, and the other Arvernians comment that he has a lisp.

== In other languages ==
- Arabic: أستريكس والترس المختفى
- Bengali: ঢালের খোঁজে অ্যাসটেরিক্স
- Catalan: L'escut arvern
- Croatian: Štit iz Overnje
- Czech: Asterix a Slavný štít
- Danish: Asterix Romernes skræk ("Asterix and Obelix, The Scare of the Romans")
- Dutch: Het ijzeren schild ("The iron shield")
- Finnish: Asterix ja kadonnut kilpi ("Asterix and the Missing Shield")
- German: Asterix und der Arvernerschild
- Greek: Η ασπίδα της Αρβέρνης
- Hungarian: Asterix és az auvergne-i pajzs ("Asterix and the Shield of Auvergne")
- Italian: Asterix e lo scudo degli Arverni
- Latin: Clipeus Arvernus
- Norwegian: Asterix og Obelix, Romernes skrekk! ("Asterix and Obelix, The Scare of the Romans") No traditional "Asterix"
- Polish: Tarcza Arwernów
- Portuguese: O Escudo de Arverne
- Romanian: Asterix și Scutul lui Căpeteniei
- Russian: Астерикс и щит арверна
- Serbian: Štit iz Arvernije
- Spanish: El escudo arverno
- Swedish: Romarnas skräck ("The Scare of the Romans")
- Turkish: Asteriks Galya Kalkanı
