= Thierry de Beaucé =

French official, politician and writer (1943–2022)

Thierry Martin de Beaucé (14 February 1943 – 25 November 2022) was a French high official, a student of the École nationale d'administration (1967–1968), writer and politician.

De Beaucé sat in several ministerial cabinets and then became a cultural advisor in Japan before joining the French Embassy in Rabat. He was appointed Director of International Relations at Elf Aquitaine, where he remained from 1981 to 1986. He was then Director General of Cultural, Scientific and Technical Relations at the Quai d'Orsay before becoming Secretary of State to the Minister of Foreign Affairs, responsible for international cultural relations (1988–91) in the second cabinet of Michel Rocard.

De Beaucé prepared and passed in 1990 the law creating the Agence pour l'enseignement français à l'étranger.

After the resignation of Michel Rocard, he was appointed chargé de mission at the Élysée, still under the presidency of François Mitterrand, then ambassador of France to Indonesia. He ended his professional career as director of international relations of the company Vivendi, then directed by Jean-Marie Messier.

In 1985, he won the Prix Contrepoint with his novel La chute de Tanger published the previous year.

== Works ==
- 1975: Les raisons dangereuses
- 1978: Un homme ordinaire
- 1979: L'île absolue. Essai sur le Japon, Olivier Orban
- 1981: Le désir de guerre, Hachette
- 1984: La chute de Tanger, Éditions Gallimard ISBN 2070701557, Prix Contrepoint (1985)
- 1988: Nouveau discours sur l'universalité de la langue française, Gallimard, ISBN 2070712583
- 1989: Le Livre d'Esther, Grasset
- 1998: L'Archipel des épices, Plon
- 1991: La république de France, Grasset & Fasquelle
- 1995: La Nonchalance de Dieu, Éditions Odile Jabob, ISBN 2738102921
- 2006: L'absent de Marrakech, Éditions du Rocher, 2006 ISBN 2268057313
