= Gonzague Saint Bris =

French journalist and writer

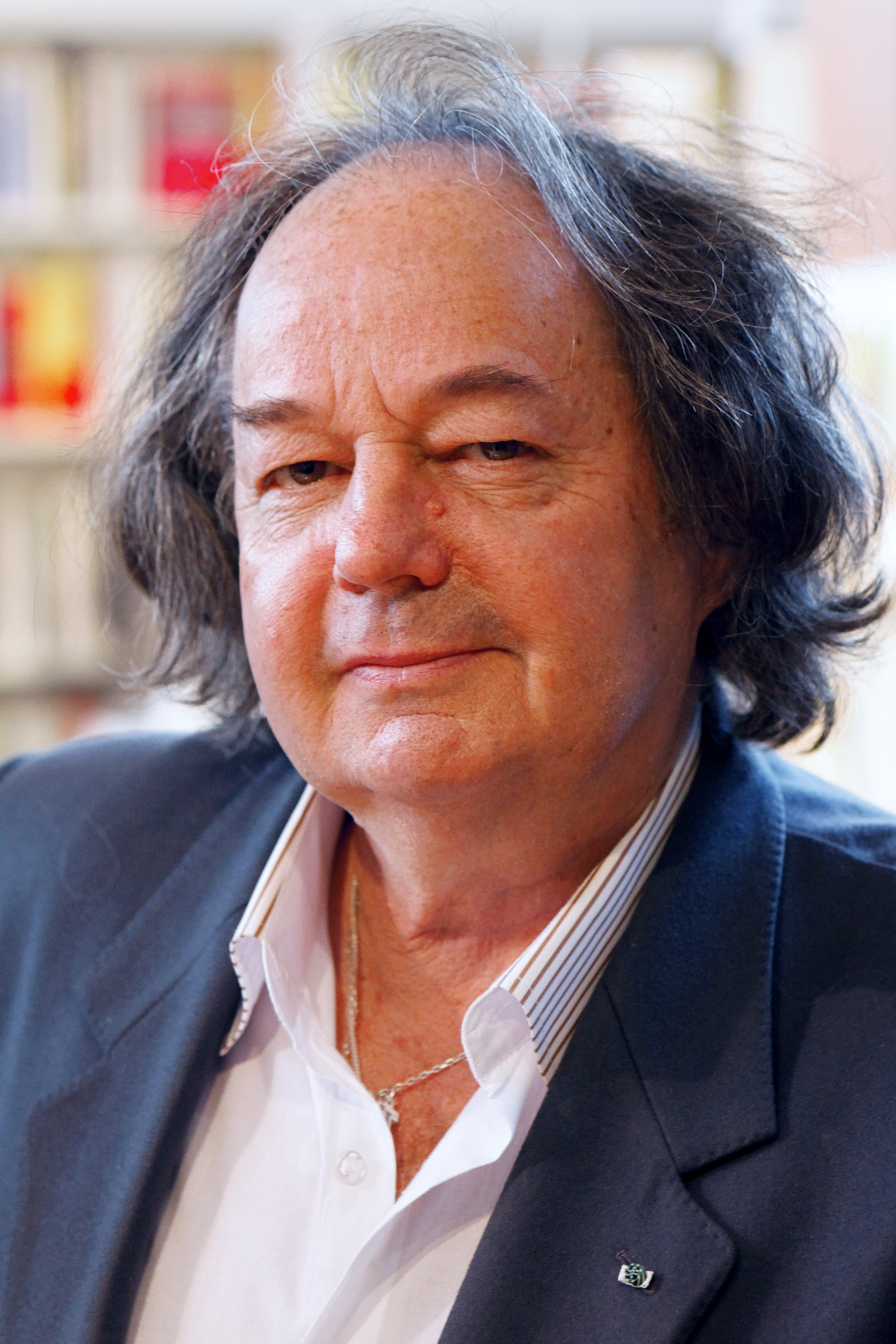
- Gonzague Saint Bris in 2011
- Born: 16 January 1948; Loches, Indre-et-Loire, France
- Died: 8 August 2017 (aged 69); Saint-Hymer, Calvados, France
- Occupations: Novelist; biographer; journalist

Gonzague Saint Bris (16 January 1948 – 8 August 2017) was an award-winning French novelist, biographer, and journalist. He won the 2002 Prix Interallié for Les Vieillards de Brighton. He was the founder of La Forêt des livres, an annual book festival, and the Cabourg Film Festival. He was also a juror for the prix Contrepoint, a French literary award. With his family, he was a co-proprietor of Clos Lucé.

== Honors and awards ==
- Knight of the Order of Legion of Honour
- Officer of the Order of Agricultural Merit
- Commander of the Ordre des Arts et des Lettres
- Knight of the Order of the Dannebrog
