= Georges Bayle =

French writer (1918–1987)

Georges Bayle ( 22 August 1918 - 13 January 1987) was a French writer.

== Biography ==
A populist author, he published Du raisin dans le gaz-oil in 1954 dedicated to Jacques Perret with whom Georges Bayle was interned during the Second World War. The plot is located in the corporation of truckers. The novel was adapted by Michel Audiard under the title Gas-oil directed by Gilles Grangier with Jean Gabin and Jeanne Moreau.

== Work ==
=== Novels ===
- 1954: Du raisin dans le gaz-oil, Série noire #217
- 1958: Les Déserteurs, Collection Blanche, Gallimard

=== Collection of short stories ===
- 1955: Le Pompiste et le Chauffeur, Collection Blanche, Gallimard, prix Cazes 1956

=== Others ===
- Cours de résistance des matériaux appliquée aux machines, Eyrolles
- Cours de statique graphique, Eyrolles, 1948

== Filmography ==
=== Adaptation ===
- 1955: Gas-oil, French film directed by Gilles Grangier, adaptation of the novel Du raisin dans le gaz-oil, with Jean Gabin and Jeanne Moreau

=== Actor ===
- 1957: Burning Fuse, French film directed by Henri Decoin, with Raymond Pellegrin and Charles Vanel

== Sources ==
- Claude Mesplède, Les Années Série noire vol.1 (1945–1959) Encrage « Travaux » #13, 1992
- Claude Mesplède and Jean-Jacques Schleret, SN Voyage au bout de la Noire, Futuropolis, 1982, p. 30.
