= Claire Castillon =

French writer

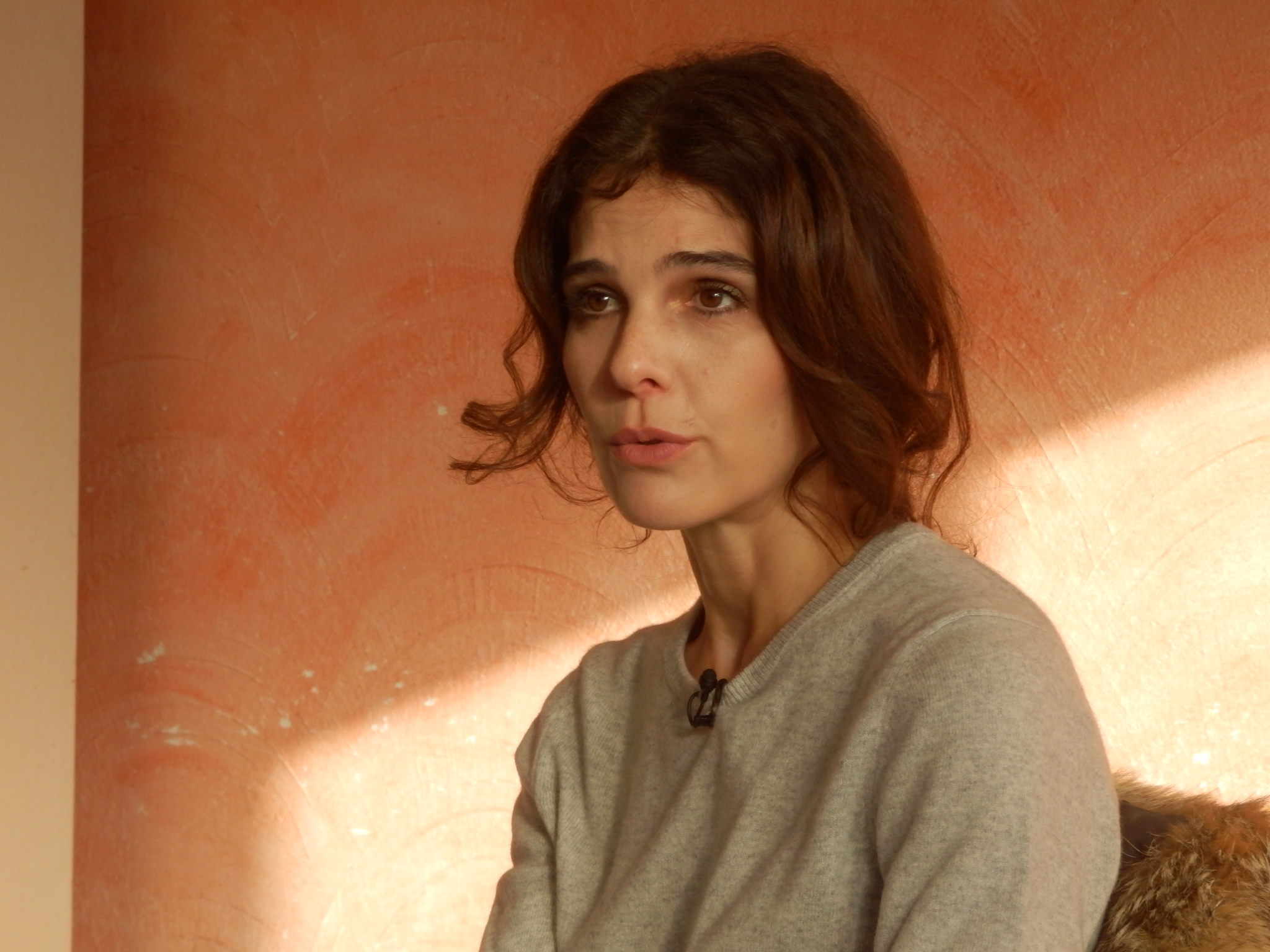
- Claire Castillon in 2018.
- Born: 25 May 1975 (age 51); Boulogne-Billancourt
- Writing career
- Language: French
- Genres: Novels, Short Stories, children's books
- Notable awards: Grand Prix Thyde Monnier (2004), Prix Marie-Claire du roman féminin (2015) Prix du concours L'Échappée littéraire (2018)

Claire Castillon, born May 25, 1975, in Boulogne-Billancourt (France), is a French writer. She writes novels, short stories and children's books.

== Life ==
In 2000, she publishes her first novel, Le Grenier, edited by Anne Carrière, which does not go unnoticed. When asked about the genuine violence of her style, she answers: This is crude and painful, not crude and gratuitous. This is not about talking bodies just for the sake of it. This is sort of outburst in pain.

Her play La poupée qui tousse is performed at the Théâtre de l'Opprimé in Paris, in 2003.

In 2004, she receives the Grand Prix Thyde Monnier from the SGDL for her novel Vous parler d'elle (Fayard 2004).

In the mid-2000s, she works with the movie director Marion Vernoux on an adaptation of her novel Je prends Racine, adaptation which is not produced.

Her collection of short stories Les Bulles (Fayard, 2010) is brought to light by the same Marion Vernoux and performed at the Marigny theater in Paris in 2013.

In 2015, her novel Eux (l'Olivier, 2014) receives Marie-Claire feminine novel award.

She animates writing workshops within the FIT association (a woman - a roof), and writes a testimony dedicated to the women she met through the association, bringing to light their daily suffering.

She regularly writes chronicles of a young mother in the magazine Parents .

Her collection of short stories Insecte(Fayard 2006) is translated into 25 languages. My mother never dies is the translation made by Harcourt in the US. In 2016, the movie director Elsa Blayau adapts it into a short film.

Her collection of short stories Rebelles, un peu, receives in May 2018 the Prix L'Échappée littéraire, which jury is composed of high school students from the French region Bourgogne-Franche-Comté .

== Works ==
=== Novels ===
- Le Grenier, Anne Carrière, 2000. ISBN 9782253153658, awarded the Prix Contrepoint
- Je prends racine, Anne Carrière, 2001. ISBN 9782253154488
- La Reine Claude, Stock, 2002. ISBN 9782234068766
- Pourquoi tu m'aimes pas ?, Fayard, 2003. ISBN 9782213641232
- Vous parler d'elle, Fayard, 2004. ISBN 9782213641249
- Dessous, c'est l'enfer, Fayard, 2008. ISBN 9782213641423
- Les Cris, Fayard, 2010. ISBN 9782253157076
- Les Merveilles, Grasset, 2012. ISBN 9782246785866
- Les couplets: Nouvelles, Grasset, 2013. ISBN 978-2-246-80398-0
- Eux, novel, L'Olivier, 2014. ISBN 9782823603675
- Les Pêchers. Paris : L'Olivier, 09/2015, 202 p. ISBN 978-2-8236-0790-1; Points n° 4683, 11/2017, 160 p. ISBN 978-2-7578-6129-5
- Ma grande. Paris : Gallimard, coll. "La Blanche", 04/2018, 145 p. ISBN 978-2-07-278625-9; Gallimard, coll. "Folio" n° 6749, 01/2020, 172 p. ISBN 978-2-07-288864-9
- Marche blanche. Paris : Gallimard, coll. "La Blanche", 01/2020, 166 p. ISBN 978-2-07-284043-2

=== Short stories ===
- Insecte. Paris : Fayard, 01/2006, 160 p. ISBN 2-213-62506-9; France loisirs, coll. "Piment", 2006, 134 p. ISBN 2-7441-9543-X; Le Livre de poche n° 30757, 03/2007, 150 p. ISBN 978-2-253-11867-1; Points n° 4284, 05/2016, 133 p. ISBN 978-2-7578-6173-8
- On n'empêche pas un petit cœur d'aimer. Paris : Fayard, 01/2007, 156 p. ISBN 978-2-213-63059-5; le Grand livre du mois, 2006, 156 p. ISBN 978-2-286-02418-5; Le Livre de poche n° 31082, 09/2008, 148 p. ISBN 978-2-253-12258-6; Points n° 4695, 11/2017, 126 p. ISBN 978-2-7578-6181-3
- Les Bulles (recueil de 38 nouvelles). Paris : Fayard, 2010, 191 p. ISBN 978-2-213-65433-1; Le Livre de poche n° 32494, 03/2011, 160 p. ISBN 978-2-253-15979-7
- Le Mâle en moi, supplément au n° 720 de Marie Claire, coll. « Les nouvelles érotiques de l'été » n° 2 : La Volupté, août 2012.
- Les Moitiés, supplément de la revue Vogue n° 929, août 2012, 62 p.
- Les Couplets. Paris : Grasset, 04/2013, 202 p. ISBN 978-2-246-80397-3; Le Livre de poche n° 33810, 07/2015, 208 p. ISBN 978-2-253-19427-9
- Les Messieurs. Paris : L'Olivier, 05/2016, 163 p. ISBN 978-2-8236-0491-7; Points n° 4588, 05/2017, 130 p. ISBN 978-2-7578-6629-0
- Rebelles, un peu. Paris : L'Olivier, 05/2017, 201 p. ISBN 978-2-8236-1153-3; Points n° 4797, 05/2018, 176 p. ISBN 978-2-7578-7140-9.

==== in English ====
- My Mother Never Dies: Stories, Houghton, 2009 ISBN 978-0-15-101426-2

=== Collections ===
- 48 h au Lutetia : 8 auteurs écrivent sur le thème du sommeil. Paris : Scali, 06/2005, 153 p. ISBN 2-35012-021-X
- Écrire au réveil, dans Le Petit Livre des plaisirs : 50 façons de goûter la vie / par Christophe André et 25 auteurs; photographies de Sandrine Expilly. Paris : Psychologies, sd, p. 63.

=== Children's novels ===
- Tous les matins depuis hier. Paris : École des loisirs, coll. "Neuf", 03/2013, 179 p. ISBN 978-2-211-21268-7
- Un maillot de bain une pièce avec des pastèques et des ananas. Paris : École des loisirs, coll. "Neuf", 02/2014, 179 p. ISBN 978-2-211-21665-4
- Tu es mignon parce que tu es un peu nul. Paris : École des loisirs, coll. "Neuf", 10/2014, 190 p. ISBN 978-2-211-21970-9
- Cucu. Paris : École des loisirs, coll. "Neuf", 04/2015, 178 p. ISBN 978-2-211-22124-5
- Y a-t-il quelqu'un dans Casimir ?. Paris : École des loisirs, coll. "Neuf", 04/2016, 152 p. ISBN 978-2-211-22787-2
- Les Piqûres d'Abeille. Paris : Flammarion jeunesse, 04/2017, 150 p. ISBN 978-2-08-140664-3
- Proxima du Centaure. Paris : Flammarion jeunesse, 02/2018, 222 p. ISBN 978-2-08-142143-1
- Miss Crampon. Paris : Flammarion jeunesse, 01/2019, 202 p. ISBN 978-2-08-143657-2
- River. Paris : Gallimard jeunesse, coll. "Scripto", 09/2019, 184 p. ISBN 978-2-07-512836-0
