= Suzanne Prou =

French writer (1920–1995)

Suzanne Prou (1920 Grimaud, Var - 29–30 December 1995) was a French novelist. She won the 1973 Prix Renaudot, for The Bernardini Terrace.

== Works ==
- Les Patapharis (Ed. Calmann-Lévy) 1966
  - The Patapharis affair: a novel, H. Regnery Co., 1970
- Les Demoiselles sous les ébéniers (Ed. Calmann-Lévy) 1967
  - Mlle. Savelli?, Harper & Row, 1971
- L'Été jaune (Ed. Calmann-Lévy) 1968
  - The yellow summer, Harper & Row, 1972
- La Ville sur la mer (Ed. Calmann-Lévy) 1970
- Méchamment les oiseaux (Ed. Calmann-Lévy) 1972 Prix Cazes
- La Terrasse des Bernardini (Ed. Calmann-Lévy) 1973 Prix Renaudot
- The Bernardinis' terrace, A. Ellis, 1975
- La petite boutique (Ed. Mercure de France) 1973
  - The paperhanger , Harper & Row, 1974, ISBN 978-0-06-013444-0
- Miroirs d'Edmée (Ed. Calmann-Lévy) 1976
  - La belle Edmée, Harper & Row, 1978, ISBN 978-0-06-013446-4
- Le rapide Paris-Vintimille (Ed. Mercure de France) 1977
- Les Femmes de la pluie (Ed. Calmann-Lévy) 1978
- La dépêche (Ed. Balland, collection L'instant romanesque) 1978
- Les dimanches (Ed. Calmann-Lévy) 1979
- Le cygne de Fanny (Ed. Mercure de France) 1980
- Le voyage aux Seychelles (Ed. Calmann-Lévy) 1981
- Mauriac et la jeune fille (Ed. Ramsay) 1982
- Le pré aux narcisses (Ed. Calmann-Lévy) 1983
- Les amis de Monsieur Paul (Ed. Mercure de France) 1985
- Le dit de Marguerite (Ed. Calmann-Lévy) 1986
- La Petite Tonkinoise (récit) (Ed. Calmann-Lévy) 1986
- Le Temps des innocents (Ed. Albin Michel) 1988
- La notairesse (Ed. Albin Michel) 1989
- La Demoiselle de grande vertu (nouvelles) (Ed. Albin Michel) 1990
- Car déjà le jour baisse (Ed. Albin Michel) 1991
- La maison des champs (Ed. Grasset) 1993
- L'Album de famille (Ed. Grasset) 1995
- Dernières feuilles (posthume) (Ed. Grasset) 1998
