= Emmanuelle Heidsieck =

French writer and journalist

- Born: 1963 (age 62–63); Paris, France
- Education: Sciences Po; Columbia University
- Occupation: Writer

Emmanuelle Heidsieck (born in 1963) is a French writer and journalist.

She won the 2006 Prix Contrepoint for Notre aimable clientèle.
