= Patricia Reznikov =

Franco-American writer

Patricia Reznikov (born 1962 in Paris) is a Franco-American writer.

== Biography ==
Reznikov graduated from the École Nationale Supérieure des Beaux-Arts in Paris. She is a novelist and a translator who worked for Les Lettres Françaises from 2005 to 2014, for the magazine Verso Le Magazine Littéraire and for Service Littéraire. She is also a juror of several prizes: the Prix Prométhée de la Nouvelle, the Prix Cabourg du Roman and the Prix Charles Oulmont of the Fondation de France.

== Works ==
=== Fiction ===
- 1994: Toro (novel) Ed. De l’Arsenal, (retenu pour l’opération “1er roman/ 1re dramatique” de France Culture, 1999
- 2001: Juste à la porte du jardin d’Eden (novel) Mercure de France, ISBN 978-2715222908, (selected for the Grand prix des lectrices de Elle)
- 2004: Mon teckel à roulettes est un philosophe (short story). Editions Du Rocher, ISBN 2268049396
- 2004: Vie et mort en magasin (short story). Ed. Du Rocher, ISBN 978-2268049403
- 2004: Dieu a égaré mon numéro de téléphone (novel) Mercure de France, ISBN 978-2715223400, (finalist of the Prix Cazes-Lipp, 2005).
- 2005: Un tour sur les montagnes russes (short story). Ed. Du Rocher, ISBN 978-2-268-05363-9
- 2007: Le Paon du Jour (novel) éditions du Rocher, ISBN 978-2-268-06336-2, (finalist of the Prix Valery Larbaud, Bourse Thyde Monnier 2007 of the Société des gens de lettres, Prix Charles Oulmont of the Foundation of France 2008).
- 2011: La Nuit n’éclaire pas tout (novel). Albin Michel 2011, ISBN 2226229760, (Prix Cazes-Lipp 2011).
- 2013: La Transcendante (novel). Albin Michel, ISBN 2226249710 (selected by the prix Fémina, finalist of the prix Renaudot, Prix Révélation 2013 of the Forêt des Livres).

=== Essays ===
- 2012: Hermann Hesse in Le Livre d'où je viens, 16 écrivains racontent. Éditions du Castor Astral
- 2014: I Colori di Massimo Arrighi (collective work), Campanotto Editore

=== Theatre ===
- 1994: Toro ou le voyage en Espagne. Radiodrama for France Culture
- Femme de la Ville. "La Métaphore", revue du Théâtre National Lille Tourcoing. Éditions de la Différence, March 1994.

=== Poetry ===
- Ton monde est le mien, 39 contemporary poets, anthology. Ed. Le Castor astral, October 2009.

=== Albums for youth ===
- 2003: La boîte de thé rouge (text and illustrations). Gallimard Jeunesse/ Amnesty International
- 2005: Le Chevalier des Rêves (text and illustrations). Ed. Du Rocher jeunesse
- 2006: La Véritable Nage Papillon (short story). “Va y avoir du sport”, collective work, Gallimard Jeunesse/ L'Écrit du Cœur
- 2007: Cerise Noire (text) illustrations by Laurent Corvaisier, Thomas Jeunesse/Amnesty International
- 2008: La Grande Invention d’Azule le Lutin (text and illustrations), Thomas Jeunesse
- 1997: L’Avenir, de Vincent Ravalec (illustrations) Éditions Michel Lagarde
- 2003: Le courage de la jeune Inuit, de J.Pasquet (illustrations) Albin Michel
- 2001: Contes et légendes des fées et des princesses (illustrations). Nathan
- 2004: Contes et légendes des mille et une nuits (illustrations). Nathan
- 2004: Contes de chevaux, de R.Causse et N.Vézinet (illustrations). Albin Michel
- 2005: Écrire le Monde, la naissance des alphabets, by N.Cauwet (illustrations). Ed. Belem, (finalist of the prix jeunesse France Télévision 2006; finalist of the prix Sorcières 2007; Prix Octogones /Ricochet 2006).
- 2006: Compter le monde, la naissance des chiffres, by N.Cauwet (illustrations) Ed. Belem, (finalist of the prix Sorcières 2006)

=== Translations from English ===
- 2006: La Soupe de Kafka, une histoire complète de la littérature mondiale en 16 recettes (Moules marinière à la Italo Calvino et Sole à la dieppoise à la Jorge Luis Borges), by Mark Crick. Flammarion
- 2008: La Baignoire de Goethe, bricoler avec les grands écrivains (Comment poser du papier peint avec Ernest Hemingway), by Mark Crick. Baker Street
- 2011: Sisters Red by Jackson Pearce, Albin Michel
- 2014: Prières pour celles qui furent volées by Jennifer Clement, Flammarion, (finalist of the prix Fémina 2014, Prix des Lectrices de Elle/Lycéennes 2015)
- 2016: Retour à Ellinghurst by Clark Clark, Flammarion
