= Prix Contrepoint =

French literary award

The prix Contrepoint is a French literary award established in 1971 by a group of young French novelists and journalists. Each year a French-speaking novelist is selected.

According to Bertrand Labes, this prize was characterized at its creation as the "Goncourt of young writers" as its recipients often confirmed their talent later on.

The jury included Christian Giudicelli, Dominique-Pierre Larger, Patrick Modiano, Claude Montcalm, Louis-Antoine Prat, Gonzague Saint Bris, Jean-Clément Texier, and Denys Viat.

This award is distinguished by the fact that, according to its rules, the winner must pay a one Franc check to each of the eight members of the jury, "for the pains taken to read his work."

== List of laureates ==
- 1972: Elvire de Brissac for Un long mois de septembre (Grasset)
- 1973: Bernard Matignon for Les Soldats de bois (Fayard)
- 1974: Raphaële Billetdoux for L'Ouverture des bras de l'homme (Seuil)
- 1975: Michel Alvès for Le Territoire (Jean-Jacques Pauvert)
- 1976: Jack-Alain Léger for Un ciel si fragile
- 1977: Christian Giudicelli for Les Insulaires (Seuil)
- 1978: Catherine Rihoit for Portrait de Gabriel (Gallimard)
- 1979: Olivier Beer for Le Chant des enfants morts (Albin Michel)
- 1980: Jérôme Hesse for Surprenante Histoire d'un jeune homme de bonne famille (Grasset)
- 1981: Jean-François Ferrané for Le Miroir de pierre (Flammarion)
- 1982: Nancy Huston for Les Variations Goldberg (Seuil)
- 1983: Gérard Pussey for L'Amour tombé du lit (Denoël)
- 1984: Catherine David for L'Océan miniature (Seuil)
- 1985: Thierry de Beaucé for La Chute de Tanger (Gallimard)
- 1986: Marie Nimier for Sirène (Gallimard)
- 1987: Élisabeth Barillé for Corps de jeune fille (Gallimard)
- 1988: Lydie Locatelli for Cent mètres d'amour avec haies et obstacles (Albin Michel)
- 1989: Gonzague Saint Bris for La Fayette, la Stature de la Liberté (Henri Filipacchi)
- 1990: Régine Michel for Les Petits Mensonges (Éditions Le Pré aux clercs)
- 1991: Ya Ding for Le Jeu de l'eau et du feu (Flammarion)
- 1992: Nino Ricci for Les Yeux bleus et le Serpent (Denoël)
- 1993: Jean-Olivier Tedesco for Le Diable et le Condottiere (Grasset)
- 1994: Louise Anne Bouchard for La Fureur (Éditions L'Âge d'Homme)
- 1996: Justine Lévy for Le Rendez-vous (Plon)
- 1997: Robert de Goulaine for Du côté de Zanzibar (Éditions Bartillat)
- 1998: Jacques-Pierre Amette for Les Deux Léopards (Seuil)
- 1999: Sylvie Derveloy for Un cœur à l'envers (Éditions du Panthéon)
- 2000: Claire Castillon for Le Grenier (Éditions Anne Carrière)
- 2001: Anna Gavalda for Je voudrais que quelqu'un m'attende quelque part (Le Dilettante)
- 2002: Anne-Sophie Brasme for Respire (Fayard)
- 2003: Émilie Frèche for Une femme normale (Ramsay)
- 2004: Bénédicte Martin for Warm up (Flammarion)
- 2005: Constance Debré for Un peu là beaucoup ailleurs (éditions du Rocher)
- 2006: Emmanuelle Heidsieck for Notre aimable clientèle (Denoël)
- 2007: Géraldine Maillet for Presque top model (Flammarion)
- 2008: Alessandra Fra for Un suicide (L'Harmattan)
- 2009: Diane de Margerie for La passion Brando (Albin Michel)
- 2010: Valérie de Changy for Fils de Rabelais (Éditions Aden)
- 2011: Capucine Motte for La vraie vie des jolies filles (JC Lattès)
- 2012: Anne Plantagenet for Nation Pigalle (Éditions Stock)
- 2013: Nathalie Rheims for Laisser les cendres s'envoler (Éditions Léo Scheer)
- 2014: Mathilde Janin for Riviera (Actes Sud)
- 2015: As a tribute to and respect for the 2015 Nobel Prize in Literature, awarded to one of its founding members, Patrick Modiano, the jury decided not to award the Prix Contrepoint 2015.
- 2016: Alessia Valli for La Nostalgie du Crépuscule (Éditions Michalon)
- 2017: Isabelle Spaak for Ça ne se fait pas and Une allure folle (Éditions des Équateurs)
- 2018: No award in memory of juror Gonzague Saint Bris, who died in 2017.
- 2019: Marion Ruggieri for Donne-moi la main pour traverser (Éditions Grasset) and Clarisse Gorokhoff for Casse-Gueule (Gallimard)
- 2020: Laure Pfeffer for Si peu la fin du monde (Buchet-Chastel) and Marie-Hélène Lafon for Le pays d'en haut (Arthaud)
- 2021: no prize because of Covid
- 2022: no prize because of Covid
- 2023: Violette d'Urso for Même le bruit de la nuit a changé (Flammarion) and Wendy Delorme for Désirer (L'Iconoclaste)
- 2024: Léa Tourret for La fille de la piscine (Gallimard) and Polina Panassenko for Tenir sa langue (L'Olivier)
- 2025: Emma Férey for Emirage (Albin Michel)
- 2026: Lolita Sene for Seules les vignes (Le Cherche Midi)
