= Ya Ding =

Chinese writer and translator (born 1959)

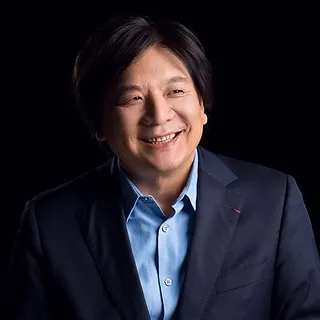

Ya Ding (Chinese: 亚丁; born 1959) is a Chinese writer and translator.

Ya comes from a little village in North China and after his secondary studies he worked as a farmer thanks to Down to the Countryside Movement. After the Cultural Revolution, he created the first University of Beijing student revue and started to translate French authors.

== Awards ==
- 1988: Prix Cazes for Le Sorgho rouge.
- 1988: Prix de l'Asie for Le Sorgho rouge
- 1988: Prix de la Découverte du Pen Club français
- 1989: Prix de l'Été for Les Héritiers des sept royaumes.
- 1991: Prix Contrepoint for Le Jeu de l'eau et du feu

== Publications ==
- 1987 Le Sorgho rouge, novel
- 1988 Les Héritiers des sept royaumes, novel
- 1990 Le Jeu de l'eau et de feu, novel
- 1992 Le Cercle de petit ciel, novel
- 1994 La Jeune Fille Tong, novel
