= Louise Anne Bouchard =

Canadian writer

Louise Anne Bouchard, originally from Quebec, is an author, screenwriter and photographer, of Canadian and Swiss citizenship. Her first novel was Cette fois, Jeanne... (1987).

== Works ==
- 1987: Cette fois, Jeanne... VLB éditeur
- 1993: La Fureur, Lausanne, L'Âge d'Homme
- 1995: Pierre va se remarier avec Florence Cordobes, Lausanne, L'Âge d'Homme
- 1997: Clélia fait enfin amende honorable, Lausanne, L'Âge d'Homme
- 1999: Les Sans-soleil, Lausanne, L'Âge d'Homme
- 2001: Vai Piano, Lausanne, L'Âge d'Homme
- 2003: Montréal privé, (Private Montreal) éditions Jacques Lanctôt
- 2010: Bleu Magritte, Vevey, L'Aire
- 2012: Du Cœur à l'Ouvrage, edited by Louise Anne Bouchard; unpublished texts and drawings by Antonio Albanese et al., Vevey, L'Aire, 2012
- 2012: L'Effet Popescu, Lausanne, BSN Press
- 2012: S'il y a un criminel à pointer du doigt, c'est le lac [short story], in Léman Noir, Marius Daniel Popesco (éd.)
- 2014: Rumeurs, Lausanne, BSN Press
- 2018: Nora, Genève, Slatkine
- 2018: Tiercé dans l'ordre, Lausanne, BSN Press

== Honors and awards ==
- 1990 Prix de la Relève 16/26 (16mm, 26 min) for Alice in the land of merguez, directed by Bruno Carrière
- 1994 Prix Contrepoint prize for French literature (Paris) (for La Fureur)
