= Jean Prasteau =

French journalist and historian

Jean Prasteau (12 May 1921 in Aytré, Charente-Maritime – 9 August 1997 in Paris) was a 20th-century French journalist and historian. He won the 1992 Prix Cazes for his book Les grandes heures du Faubourg Saint-Germain.

== Publications ==
- 1954: Les Iles d'Ouest, Arthaud
- 1957: Iles de Paris, Arthaud
- 1960: Fenêtres sur Seine, le Livre contemporain
- 1963: C'était la Dame aux camélias, Éditions Perrin
- 1968: Les automates, Éditions Gründ
- 1974: Les Heures Enchantées du Marais, Perrin, ISBN 2262001820
- 1975: La Merveilleuse aventure du Casino de Paris, Éditions Denoël, ISBN 978-2207221709
- 1981: Il était une fois des enfants dans l’histoire, Perrin, ISBN 2262002053 Prix M. et Mme Louis Marin de l'Académie française
- 1982: La Gare de Lyon et ses grandes heures, S.N.C.F.
- 1985: Voyage Insolite dans la Banlieue de Paris, Perrin, ISBN 978-2262003692
- 1989: Charentes et merveilles, Éditions France-Empire, ISBN 978-2704806270
- 1989: Il était une fois Versailles, Pygmalion, ISBN 978-2857044079
- 1991: L'orgue du diable, Presses de la Cité, ISBN 978-2285000517
- 1992: Les grandes heures du Faubourg Saint-Germain, Perrin, ISBN 9782262008192, Prix Cazes
- 1992: L'affaire Sylvie Paul, Fleuve noir, ISBN 978-2265046689
- 1993: Le boucher de la Chapelle, Fleuve noir, ISBN 2-265-04949-2
- 1993: Il était une fois le Louvre, Pygmalion, ISBN 2-85704-405-4
