= Michel Alvès =

French writer

Michel Alvès (born 14 September 1940, Nice) is a French writer.

He is the author of four novels:

- 1962: Le Pêcheur, Éditions Grasset
- 1962: Entre les barricades, Grasset
- 1972: Le Territoire, Jean-Jacques Pauvert, Prix Contrepoint in 1975
- 1994: Le Livre d'heures, Éditions Phébus, ISBN 978-2859403133

as well as a collection of poems, Des lois naturelles.
