= Dominique Paravel =

French writer (born 1955)

Dominique Paravel (born 1955) is a French writer.

== Works ==
- 2011: Nouvelles vénitiennes, Serge Safran publisher, ISBN 1090175000 — prix Thyde Monnier of the Société des gens de lettres, prix de la Nouvelle de la Femme Renard Lauzerte, prix du 1er recueil de nouvelles lors de la Fête de la nouvelle au château de Chamerolles.
- 2013: Uniques, Serge Safran publisher, ISBN 1090175124
- 2016: Giratoire, Serge Safran publisher, ISBN 1090175434 — prix Cazes / brasserie Lipp.
