= Béatrice Commengé =

French novelist and translator

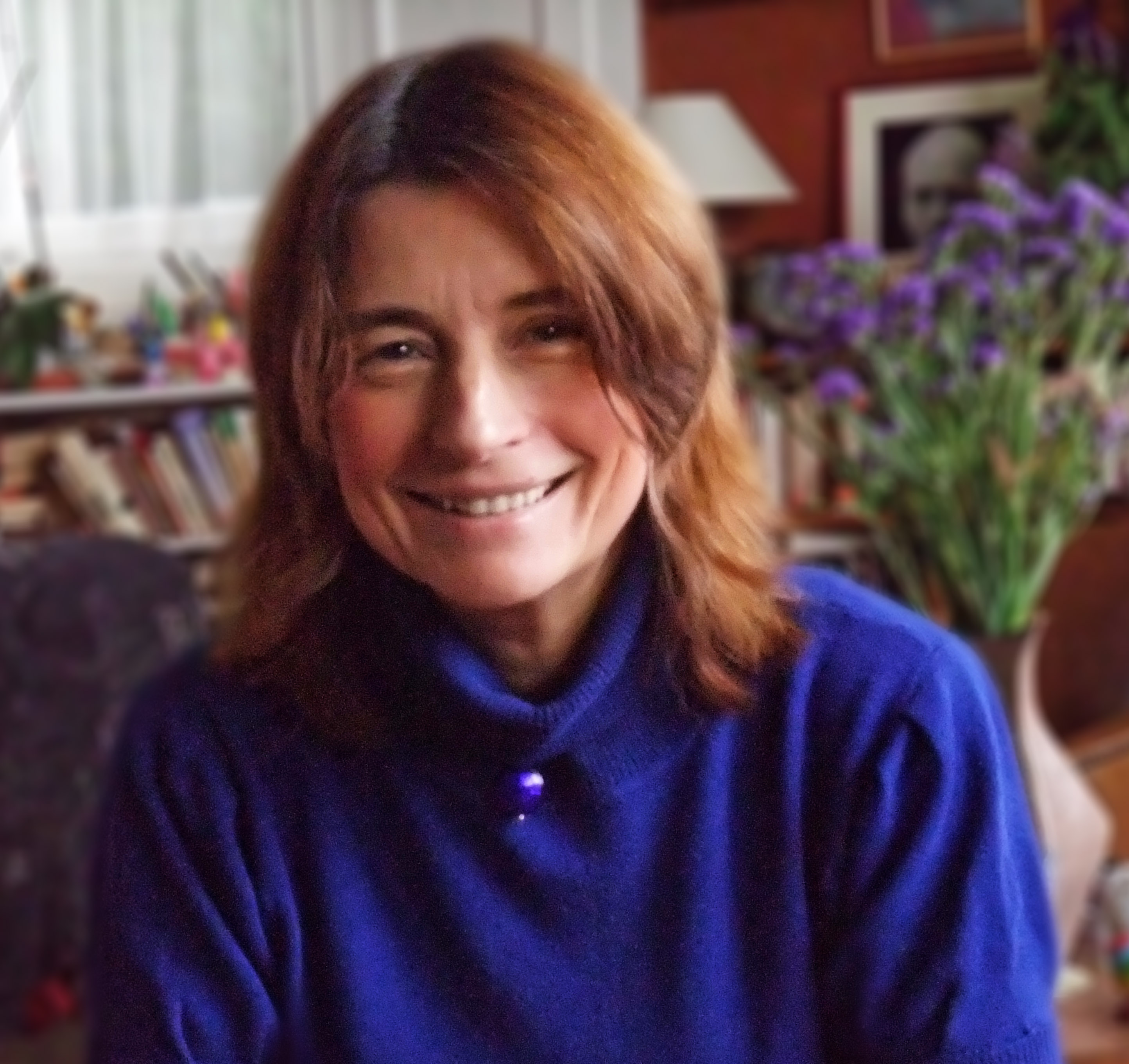
Béatrice Commengé

Béatrice Commengé (born 1949 in Algiers) is a French novelist and translator.

== Biography ==
After a Ph.D. on Virginia Woolf, she embarked on a master's degree in dance which culminated in the publication of her essay "The Dance of Nietzsche".

Her first novel, La Nuit est en avance d'un jour, was published in 1985 at Éditions Orban. She translated the entire non-expunged Journal of Anaïs Nin.

A great traveler, she has contributed to many literary journals such as L'Infini, Les Cahiers de l'Herne, L'Atelier du roman, La Revue des ressources on the internet or the magazine Grands Reportages.

Béatrice Commengé obtained the Prix Cazes in 2004 for her book Et il ne pleut jamais, naturellement which was also selected for the prizes Femina and Wepler.

== Works ==
- 1985: La Nuit est en avance d'un jour, Orban
- 1988: La Danse de Nietzsche, Gallimard
- 1989: Le Ciel du voyageur, Gallimard
- 1991: Henry Miller, ange, clown, voyou, Plon
- 1995: Alexandrines, La Table Ronde
- 1998: L'Homme immobile, Gallimard
- 2003: Et il ne pleut jamais, naturellement, Gallimard
- 2007: En face du jardin - Six jours dans la vie de Rainer Maria Rilke, Flammarion,
- 2009: Voyager vers des noms magnifiques, Éditions Finitude
- 2011: L'occasion fugitive, Éditions Léo Scheer
- 2012: Flâneries anachroniques, Éditions Finitude
- 2015: Le Paris de Modiano, Éditions Alexandrines
- 2016: Une vie de paysages, Éditions Verdier
- 2020: Alger, rue des Bananiers, Éditions Verdier
