= Yves Grosrichard =

French journalist (1907–1992)

- Born: 25 November 1907; Paris
- Died: 9 October 1992 (aged 84); Pléneuf-Val-André, Côtes-d'Armor
- Occupation: Journalist

Yves Grosrichard (1907-1992) was a 20th-century French journalist who led an important role in the editing press in France after the World War II.

== Biography ==
Born in 1907 in Paris, Grosrichard was a nephew of Gustave Tery, who directed the daily L’œuvre until his death in 1928. Bachelor of Arts, Grosrichard began in the same newspaper as parliamentary editor in 1931. He arrived in Le Canard Enchaîné in 1935. During the Second World War, he took up a post at the National éducation. He became professor of [French] at the Turgot College from 1940 to 1943, and at the Lavoisier superior primary school from 1 October 1944. He joined the French Resistance: He was arrested on December 10, 1943, by the Germans at his home, then incarcerated in Fresnes Prison for an unknown period. He was co-editor-in-chief of the Canard enchaîné in 1947 with Ernest Reynaud, until the fall of 1953. He headed the Foreign Policy Service of France-Soir and in 1953 he left Le Canard Enchaîné to devote himself entirely to this newspaper. He multiplied the collaborations at the Liberation: L'Ordre, Carrefour, Ambiance, La Bataille, La France intérieure, La Voix de Paris, France-Soir. He was the editor-in-chief of the « Journal parlé » de la Radiodiffusion française from 1944 to 1946. He died in 1992.

== Bibliography ==
- 1953: Zèbre. Gallimard
- 1956: La compagne de l'homme. Gallimard
- 1958: L'Amérique insolite. Nouvelle Revue Française, series "l'Air du Temps."
- 1961: Le haut du pavé. Gallimard
- 1967: Histoire de la Guerre 1939-1945. Hachette, (under the direction of Pierre Lazareff)
- 1970: Les 100 visages de Bismarck, Presses de la Cité
