= André Girard (1909–1993) =

French resistance member

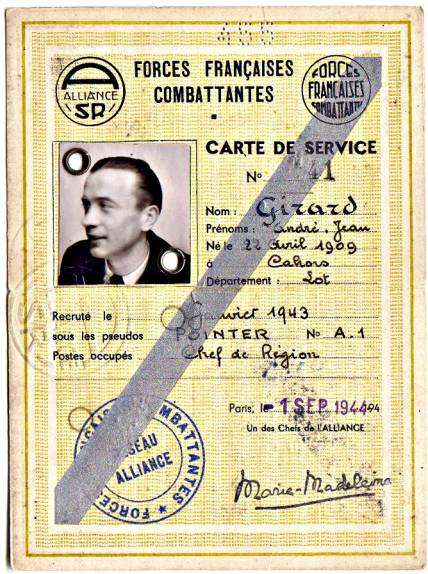
André Girard's identity card, September 1944

André Girard (born 22 April 1909 in Cahors, died 4 June 1993 in La Mulatière, near Lyon) was a French civil servant and Resistance worker with the ALLIANCE network.

== Life ==
=== Pre-war ===
André Girard worked for the Société d'exploitation industrielle des tabacs et des allumettes in France from 1929 onwards.

=== French Resistance ===
He was captured at the Battle of Dunkirk in 1940, but escaped from Germany in 1941 to Brive-la-Gaillarde and soon joined the French Resistance.

Under the pseudonym "Pointer", André Girard was the regional head of the Alliance or "Arche de Noé" resistance network in occupied France from 1940 to 1945, the only network whose supreme commander was a woman, Marie-Madeleine Fourcade (Alias "Hérisson"). This network was notable for giving almost all of its three thousand agents codenames based on animals : Bleu d'Auvergne, Setter, Labrador, Bichon, Abeille, Aigle... Divided up by region, the network's central command was "Hôpital" (centre-west sector), which André Girard led from 1943 to September 1944. In 1944, his sector numbered 185 main agents across 16 départements, from south of the Loire to north of the Garonne, a sector particularly marked by the Tulle and Oradour-sur-Glane massacres. Its agents were from diverse social backgrounds – the mayor of La Rochelle and colonel in the reserve Léonce Vieljeux, the student Roland Creel, the vicar of Tulle cathedral Charles Lair, the usselois doctor Jean Sirieix, the intelligence commissioner Henry Castaing, the briviste businessman Pierre Bordes, the secretary-general to the council of Guéret Roland Deroubaix, the creusois lawyer René Nouguès or the electrician Vincent Renaud, as well as civil servants, peasants, surgeons, railway workers, architects, and ushers.

On 30 June 1945, charged with a mission of the utmost importance for the Direction générale des études et recherches and promoted to captain, he was demobbed at his own request. Returning to his pre-war job, André Girard was transferred to the tobacco factory at Riom before becoming administrative director and inspector of the tobacco factory at Lyon until his retirement. He also succeeded Jacques Soustelle on the municipal council of Lyon in 1962 under Louis Pradel. He was for several years the national treasurer of the Old Comrades association for the ALLIANCE network. He published his war memoirs in 1965 with éditions France-Empire under the title "Le temps de la méprise".

He is buried in the cemetery at Saint-Sauves d'Auvergne.

== Medals ==
- Officier de la Légion d'honneur
- Croix de guerre 1939–1945, 2 citations
- Médaille de la Résistance
- Médaille des évadés
- Croix du combattant volontaire
- Croix du combattant volontaire de la Résistance
- Insigne des blessés militaires
- Croix du combattant de l'Europe
- Croix d'honneur du mérite Franco-britannique
- King's Medal for Courage in the Cause of Freedom (UK)

== Sources ==
- Le temps de la méprise, by André Girard, éditions France-Empire, 1965
- L'arche de noé, by Marie-Madeleine Fourcade, éditions Fayard, 1968
- Les SS en Limousin, Quercy et Périgord, by Georges Beau and Léopold Gaubusseau, éditions des Presses de la Cité, 1969
- Marie-Madeleine Fourcade, un chef de la Résistance, by Michèle Cointet, éditions Perrin, 2006
- Centre national d'études de la Résistance et de la Déportation Edmond Michelet, 4 rue Champanatier, 19100 Brive-la-Gaillarde
