= Sentier =

Neighbourhood in Paris, France

Sentier is a neighbourhood in the 2nd arrondissement of Paris which has been known historically as a multicultural textile and garment manufacturing district. Since the late 1990s, it has increasingly become home to many Internet start-up companies and has acquired the nickname Silicon Sentier.

== Geography ==
Sentier, Paris

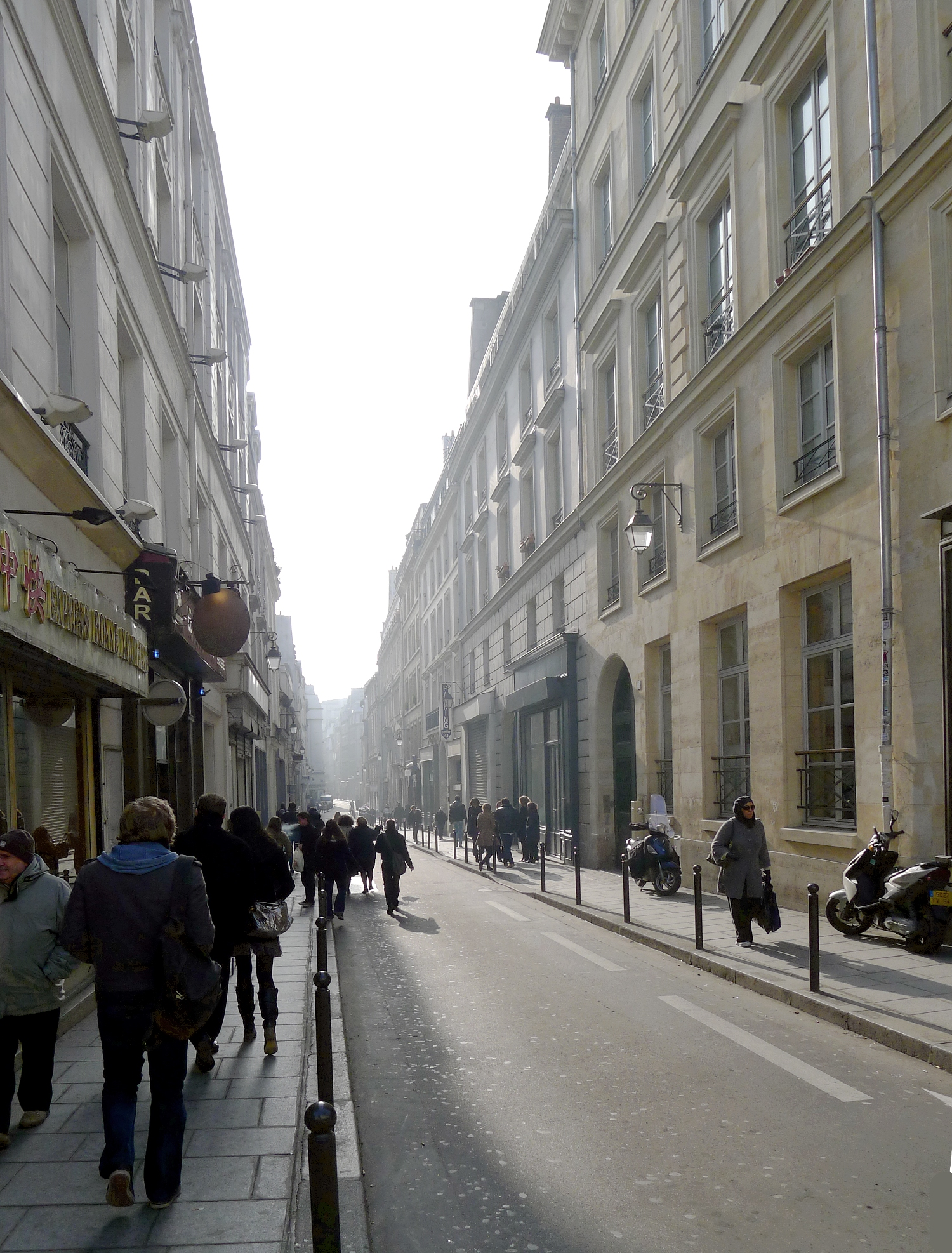
A typical street in the neighborhood, Rue du Sentier

The area is a rectangle of buildings bounded by rue Montmartre to the west, the Boulevard de Sebastopol to the east, Boulevard Poissonnière and Boulevard Bonne-Nouvelle to the north and by rue Reaumur in the south.

It is crossed by several roads including rue d'Aboukir, rue de Caire and Place du Caire.

== Sentier's Textile Products ==
- The textile industry includes: wholesalers, distributors, small tailors and retail shops etc..
- Fabric, clothing, lingerie, footwear, jewellery, fashion, accessories, supplies, raw textile materials, linen, leather goods, luggage, haberdashery, etc.

== From textiles to "Silicon Sentier" ==
Because of its proximity to the former Paris stock exchange building (the Palais Brongniart), the AFP and many financial companies, several operators have deployed high-speed fibre optic networks in the area.

Around this time specialized companies also opened datacenters in the area for telephone operators, internet service providers and large companies, allowing them greater network connectivity. One of the first was the "Telehouse-1" datacenter opened by the company Telehouse Europe in 1996 on rue de Jeuneurs. Despite much larger datacenters now existing in the Parisian suburbs, Telehouse-1 is still used today by some thirty operators, including specialist services for large companies such as Neuf Cegetel, Completel, Verizon and Orange Business Services.

During the Dot Com Boom in the late 1990s, approximately fifty startups settled in the Sentier area, including offices for Yahoo!, Nomad, Lastminute.fr, Net2one, BuyCentral, Webcible and MandrakeSoft. The area was attractive to startups because of its proximity to fibre optic routes and also because there were many empty spaces left over when some of the garment factories moved out. At first rents were affordable, however free spaces are now becoming rare, and rents in the neighbourhood are rising.

After the Dot-Com bubble burst (around 2000) many firms that were established in the area closed.

== Sentier in literature ==
By the 19th century, Sentier was the center of the textile industry in France. Honoré de Balzac refers to it several times in Le Bal de Sceaux, where Emilie de Fontaine discovers Maximilien Longueville selling fabric. It was also traditionally the area housing the headquarters of the many newspapers, as Balzac mentions in the Rabouilleuse where Philippe Bridau files his copy before going to dinner at the Rocher de Cancale.

Dominique Manotti in Sombre Sentier (Seuil Policiers, 1995), is set against the backdrop of striking illegal Turkish workers in Sentier.

Sentier keeps the quiet loneliness of the anonymous poet in Juan Goyitsolo's "Paisajes Después de La Batalla".

American author Cara Black sets in the Sentier her third in Paris murder-thrillers with amateur sleuth Aimée Leduc: Murder in the Sentier (2003).

== Films shot in Sentier ==
- 1997 XXL by Ariel Zeitoun
- 1997: La Vérité si je mens! Thomas Gilou
- 2001: La Vérité si je mens! 2 Thomas Gilou
- 2003: Monsieur Ibrahim Directed by Francois Dupeyron
- 2010: Trails of Prosper and Nicolas Droin Hillairet
- 2012: La Vérité si je mens! 3 Thomas Gilou
