= Roger Kempf =

French philosopher and ethnologist (1927–2014)

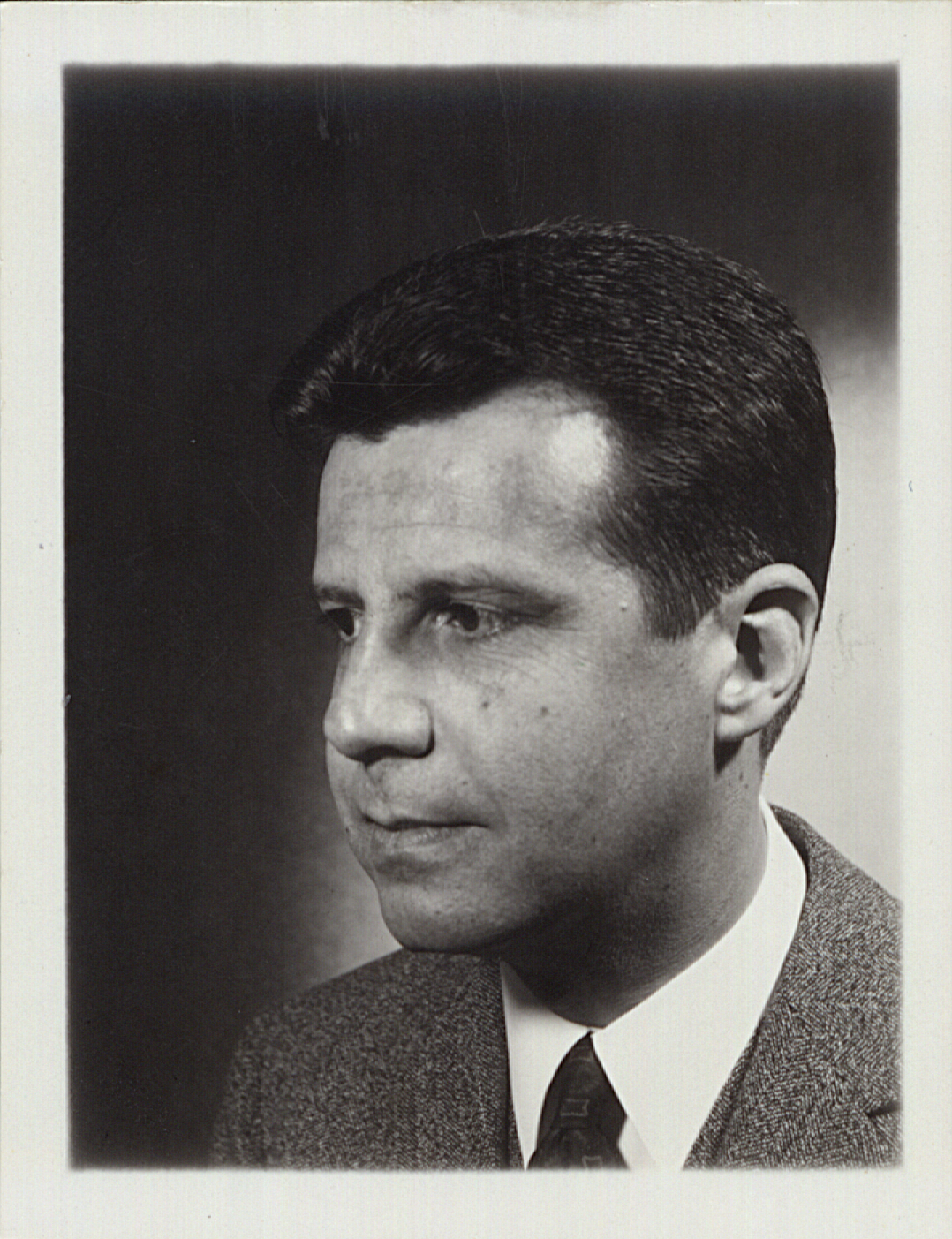
Roger Kempf

Roger Kempf (6 July 1927 – 9 September 2014) was a French writer, philosopher, Germanist and ethnologist of literature, and emeritus professor at the École polytechnique fédérale de Zurich.

He was awarded several literary prizes, including the Prix Alfred Née of the Académie française in 1969 for his book Sur le corps romanesque, the Prix Ève Delacroix of the Académie française in 2005 for L'indiscrétion des frères Goncourt and the Prix Femina essai in 2004 for the same work.

== Publications ==
=== Fiction ===
- Un ami pour la vie, Grasset
- Avec André Gide (tale), Grasset

=== Essai ===
- Diderot et le roman, Seuil, coll. Pierres Vives
- Sur le corps romanesque, Seuil, coll. Pierres Vives
- How nice to see you! Americana. Mœurs : ethnologie et fiction, Seuil, coll. Pierre Vives
- Dandies : Baudelaire et Cie, Seuil, coll. Pierre Vives
- Sur le dandysme (texts presented by Roger Kempf), Union Générale des éditions
- Les États-Unis en mouvement (collectif Méditations, n° 1), Denoël/Gonthier
- Le Pénis et la démoralisation de l'Occident (with Jean-Paul Aron), Grasset, coll. Figures, 1978
- Bouvard, Flaubert et Pécuchet, Grasset
- L'indiscrétion des frères Goncourt, Grasset, 2004, Prix Ève-Delacroix of the Académie française, 2005 and Prix Femina essai 2004.

=== Translation ===
- Essai pour introduire en philosophie le concept de grandeur négative bty Emmanuel Kant, Vrin
- Observations sur le sentiment du beau et du sublime by Emmanuel Kant, Vrin
- Controverse avec Eberhard by Emmanuel Kant, Vrin
