= Anne Plantagenet (writer) =

Anne Plantagenet (1972, Joigny (Yonne) is a French novelist and translator from Spanish.

She translated her first novel from Spanish in 1994 and published her first book in 1998. Since then, she has continued to write, translate and publish, exploring all genres.

In 2012, she was awarded the Prix Contrepoint for her novel Nation Pigalle published the previous year.

== Works ==
- 1998: Un coup de corne fut mon premier baiser, novel, Ramsay
- 2005: Seule au rendez-vous, novel, Robert Laffont, Prix du récit biographique 2005.
- 2005: Manolete, biographie, Ramsay, Prix de la ville d'Hossegor 2006.
- 2007: Marilyn Monroe, biography, Folio Biographies,
- 2008: Onze femmes, short stories, collective work, J'ai lu
- 2008: Pour les siècles des siècles, short stories, Stock, J'ai lu, 2009.
- 2009: Le Prisonnier, novel, Stock, J'ai lu, 2011.
- 2011: Nation Pigalle, novel, Stock, J'ai lu, 2014. , Prix Contrepoint
- 2014: Trois jours à Oran, Stock, followed by Le désir et la peur, J'ai lu, 2015.
- 2015: La Vraie Parisienne, J'ai lu
- 2016: Appelez-moi Lorca Horowitz, novel, Stock

== Translations ==
- 2008: Une semaine en octobre, Elizabeth Subercaseaux, novel, Chile, Flammarion
- 2009: L'Infini dans la paume de la main, Gioconda Belli, novel, Nicaragua, Jacqueline Chambon
- 2010: L'Enfant poisson, Lucia Puenzo, novel, Argentina, Stock La Cosmopolite
- 2010: Savoir perdre, David Trueba, novel, Spain, Flammarion
- 2011: La Malédiction de Jacinta, Lucía Puenzo, novel, Argentina, Stock La Cosmopolite
- 2011: Les Révoltés de Cordoue, Ildefonso Falcones, novel, Spain, Robert Laffont
- 2012: Cœur de napalm, Clara Usón, novel, Spain, JC Lattès
- 2012: La Fureur de la langouste, Lucía Puenzo, Argentina, Stock
- 2013: Wakolda, Lucía Puenzo, Argentina, Stock
- 2013: Quand nous étions révolutionnaires, Roberto Ampuero, Chile, Lattès
- 2014 :La fille de l'Est, Clara Usón, Spain, Gallimard
- 2015: De chair et d'os, Dolores Redondo, Spain, Mercure de France
- 2016: Les trois mariages de Manolita, Almudena Grandes, Spain, Jean-Claude Lattès
- 2016: Blitz, David Trueba, Spain, Flammarion
- 2019: Notre Part de Nuit , Mariana Enriquez
