= L'Auvergnat de Paris =

L'Auvergnat de Paris is a French weekly newspaper started on 14 July 1882 by Louis Bonnet, and, until 2009, distributed throughout France. It had a circulation of around 15,000, falling in its last years to around 10,000 before going into administration. It had the sub-title Du Massif central et fier de l’être ("From the Massif Central and proud to be so") and was a trade journal for Paris restaurants and brasseries. An Auvergnat is someone who comes from the Auvergne province or Auvergne region of France.

In July 2008 was bought by the Société à responsabilité limitée Bistrots et Comptoirs de Paris from businessman Gilles Barissat, who had owned it for ten years. Facing severe financial difficulties, and having failed to find a new buyer, it was placed into liquidation on 6 October 2009 by the Paris Commercial Tribunal.

Groupe Michel Burton Communication – publisher of Lettre CHR-CHD, Décision Boissons, La Revue des Comptoirs and its supplements, Le Shaker, Tendances and Carnets de bar – has owned the title since 15 October 2009. It returned to the newsstands on 5 November 2009.
