= Jean-Paul Aron =

French writer, philosopher and journalist

Jean-Paul Aron (27 May 1925 – 20 August 1988) was a French writer, philosopher and journalist. His most notable work is Les Modernes, which was published in 1984.

== Life ==
Aron was born in Strasbourg. He was a close friend of Michel Foucault in the early 1950s, before a falling out over a lover. He was, like Foucault, an early person of renown in France to die of AIDS, and is widely credited for giving the disease a human face and challenging the public perception of the disease. During his lifetime, he published several historical works that examined middle-class social practices. He is buried at 6, rue du Repos in Paris.

== Selected publications ==
=== Novels and plays ===
- La Retenue (novel) Grasset, 1962
- Point mort (novel) Grasset, 1964
- Le Bureau (play), 1970
- Fleurets mouchetés (play), 1970
- Les Voisines (play), 1980

=== Non-fiction ===
- Essai sur la sensibilité alimentaire à Paris au XIXe siècle, Armand Colin, 1967
- Philosophie zoologique, by Jean-Baptiste de Lamarck (presentation by Jean-Paul Aron), 10/18, 1968
- Essai d'épistémologie biologique, Christian Bourgois, 1969
- Anthropologie du conscrit français (with Emmanuel Le Roy Ladurie and Paul Dumont), Mouton, 1972
- Le Mangeur du XIXe siècle, Laffont, 1973
  - translated into English as The Art of Eating in France: Manners and Menus in the Nineteenth Century. London: Peter Davies, 1975; New York: Harper & Row, 1976
- Qu’est-ce que la culture française?, Denoël-Gonthier, 1975
- Le Pénis et la démoralisation de l’Occident (with Roger Kempf), Grasset, 1978
- Misérable et glorieuse, la femme du XIXe siècle (animated and presented by Jean-Paul Aron), Fayard, 1980
- Les Modernes, Gallimard, 1984
