= Marie-Claude Sandrin =

French writer (born 1937)

Marie-Claude Sandrin (born December 1937, in Bordeaux) is a French writer.

== Biography ==
Sandrin won the prix Cazes in 1967 for her first novel, La Forteresse de boue, published by Buchet/Chastel. Two other novels will be published by the same house: La Cendre d’un été (1971) and L’homme à chagrin (1980).

Several critics have highlighted relationships with Chateaubriand, Mauriac, Gracq, whom Marie-Claude Sandrin considers to be her "family".

Marie-Claude Sandrin also held a career in journalism and worked for twenty years in the Méridional, as well as in numerous magazines.

== Works ==
Novels

- 1967: La Forteresse de boue, Buchet/Chastel
- 1971: La Cendre d’un été, Buchet/Chastel
- 1980: L’Homme à chagrin, Buchet/Chastel

Essays

- 1980: Salut Baby, dialogue between a mother and her teenage daughter, Groupe De Boeck.
- 1991: Champions de Dieu, recueil de témoignages de « rencontres avec Dieu », Arléa
- 1995: Mon compagnon de misère, testimony collected from a former alcoholic, Éditions n°1
