= Éditions France-Empire =

France-Empire is an independent French publishing house, created in 1945 by advocate and politician Yvon Chotard.

== History ==
In 1945, at the end of the Second World War, Éditions France-Empire began publishing works about the war years 1939-1945. Following that were publishings of the period of decolonization. The publishing house was created on the funds of the Sève et Morat. The company has belonged to the group Desquenne et Giral (Euronext) since 1990.

In the 1960s and 1970s, France-Empire was notable due to the success of a series of works written by the journalist Christian Bernadac. Christian Bernadac was devoted to the writings of deportations during the Holocaust, which were the biggest sellers at the time. Éditions France-Empire then pursued with catalog essays, novels, biographies, and memoirs in the historical domain.

Éditions France-Empire was deregistered on March 26, 2013.

== Some authors published by Éditions France-Empire ==
- Hafid Aggoune
- Christian Bernadac
- Yann Brekilien
- Frédéric Chaslin
- Pierre Clostermann
- Jean Deruelle
- Samuel Dock
- Alexandre Dumas
- Jean-Pierre Fourcade
- Guy Gauthier
- André Girard
- Philippe Guilhaume
- Philippe Kieffer
- Stéphanie Le Bail
- Hervé Le Boterf
- Yves Le Prieur
- Pierre Mazeaud
- Jean Prasteau
- Jeanne de Recqueville
- Colonel Rémy
- Michel Roussin
- Alice Saunier-Seïté
- Henri Spade
- Pierre Suard
- Éric Vanneufville
- Violaine Vanoyeke
- Marc Villemain
- Alain Vircondelet
- Jérôme-Arnaud Wagner
