= Christian Giudicelli =

French novelist and literary critic (1942–2022)

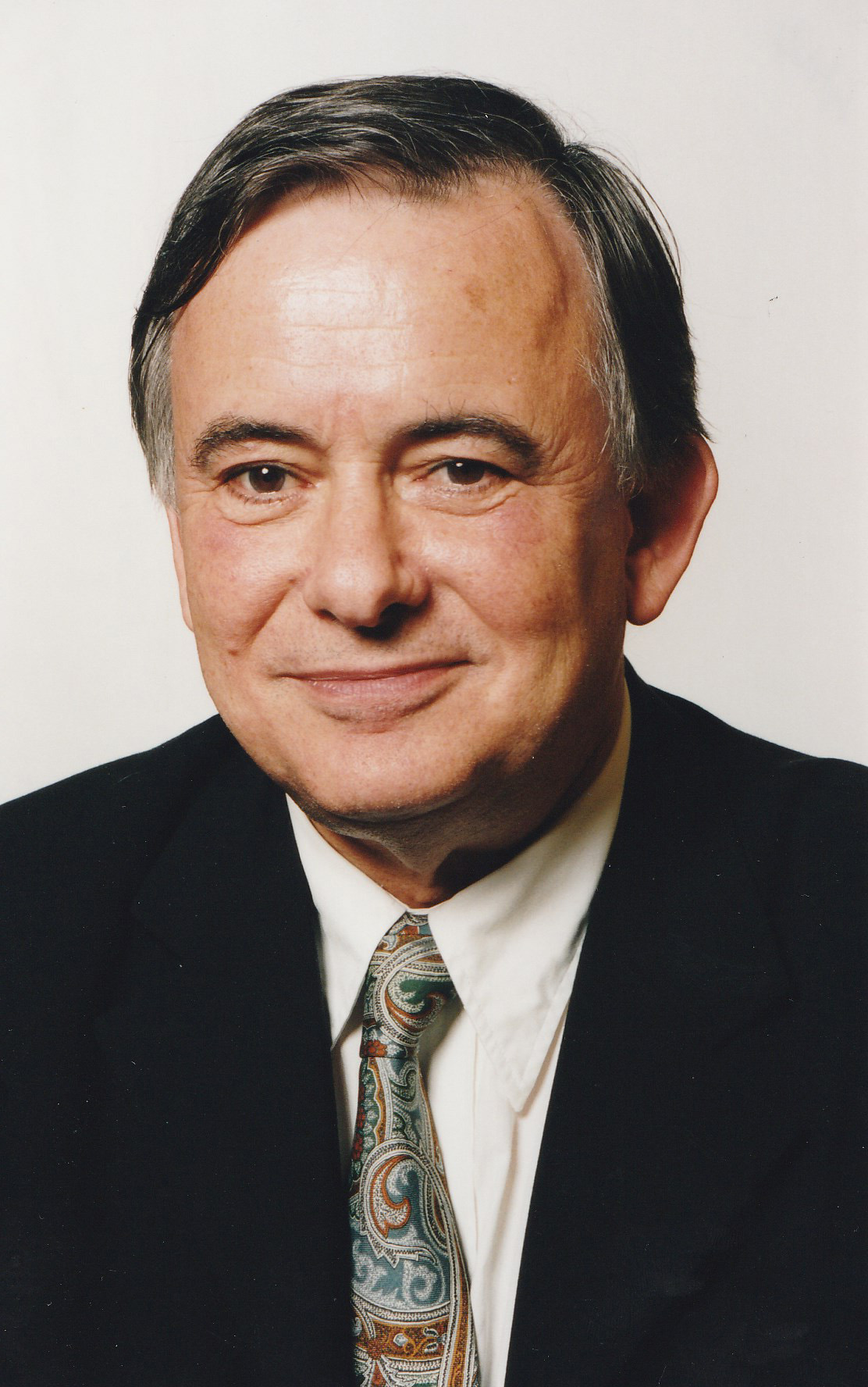
- Giudicelli in 2001
- Born: 27 June 1942; Nîmes, France
- Died: 14 May 2022 (aged 79); Paris, France
- Occupations: Writer; Literary critic
- Partner: Claude Verdier (until 1997)

Christian Giudicelli (27 June 1942 – 14 May 2022) was a French novelist and literary critic. His seventh novel, Station balnéaire, was awarded the 1986 Prix Renaudot. Giudicelli was one of the eight jury members of the French literary award Prix Contrepoint.

== Biography ==
Giudicelli was born in Nîmes. He was a jury member of the Renaudot French literary prize from 1993.

He contributed to literary publications including, La Nouvelle Revue française, Combat, Cahiers des saisons, La Quinzaine littéraire, Le Figaro Magazine, Écrivain magazine, as well as literary programs on France Culture.

His writing is intimate, sensitive and melancholy; he draws the material for his novels and stories from his own experiences, travels, and friendships. He lived in Paris since the early 1960s. However, his works are largely unread; his last book, in 2019, sold only 180 copies.

His close friendship with writer and accused paedophile Gabriel Matzneff is mentioned in his books, Les Spectre Joyeux and Gabriel infiniment aimable. He agreed to hide incriminating letters and photographs of Vanessa Springora for Matzneff, whom Springora accused of taking her as his lover when she was 14, according to Matzneff's writings. Giudicelli died of cancer in Paris at the age of 79 on 14 May 2022.

== Bibliography ==
- Le Jeune Homme à la licorne, Editions du Rocher 1966; reissue 1994
- Une leçon particulière, Editions du Seuil 1968
- Une poignée de sable, Editions du Seuil 1971
- Mémoire d'un traducteur, Gallimard, 1974
- Les Insulaires, Editions du Seuil, 1976; Collection Points-Roman, 1998
- Une affaire de famille, Editions du Seuil, 1981; Collection Points-Roman 1984, Prix Valéry Larbaut
- Le Point de fuite, 1984
- Station balnéaire, Gallimard, 1986, Collection Folio 1988, Prix Renaudot
- Double express, 1990
- Quartier d'Italie, Editions du Rocher 1993, Collection Folio 1996
- Jacques Noël, entretiens, 1993
- Celui qui s'en va, Editions du Seuil, 1996
- Fragments tunisiens, éditions du Rocher, 1998
- Parloir, roman autobiographique, 2002
- Karamel, théâtre, 2003
- Après toi, 2004
- Les Passants, 2007
- Claude Verdier, peintre, 2007
- Square de la Couronne, 2010

=== Theatre ===
- La Reine de la nuit, l'Avant-Scène, 1977
- Le Chant du bouc, l'Avant-Scène, 1981
- Première Jeunesse, Actes Sud-Papier, 1987
- Les Lunatiques, 1993
- Bon Baisers du Lavandou, Becasouille, 2000
- Secret Défense de Jean-Paul Farré et Christian Giudicelli, directed by Anne-Marie Gros and Jean-Marie Lecoq, 2006
