= Jean Blot =

French writer (1923–2019)

Alexandre Blokh (Russian: Александр Арнольдович Блок), called Jean Blot, (31 March 1923, Moscow – 23 December 2019, Sainte-Geneviève-des-Bois (Essonne)) was a French writer, translator, and senior civil servant of Russian origin.

== Biography ==
Blot came from two bourgeois families (St. Petersburg diamonds for his father, wholesale grocer for his mother). In the USSR of the twenties, his parents worked at the defense commissioner for his father, as a lawyer for street children for his mother. His family moved to Germany at the time of the NEP, then moved to Paris where he attended primary school. Sent to England to learn English for high school, he spent the war in France. A Russian and Jewish refugee, he fled to Lyon and engaged in the Resistance (Le juif Margolin 1998). He was a doctor of Law, Bachelor of Arts, International Civil Servant at the United Nations in New York (1946–1956), in Geneva (1958–1961) then at the UNESCO in Paris (from 1962). He travelled all over the world. International Secretary of the PEN club from 1981 to 1997 and then International Vice President of Pen Club since 1998 and President of the French Pen club from 1999 to 2005. In 1990 he created the Russian Pen club. He was a novelist but also a literary critic in relation to his trilingualism (French, Russian, English).

== Works ==
- 1951: Naissance de l'État coréen
- 1956: Le Soleil de Cavouri, Éditions Gallimard
- 1959: Les Enfants de New-York, Gallimard
- 1961: Obscur ennemi, Gallimard
- 1964: Les Illusions nocturnes
- 1968: La Jeune Géante, Gallimard
- 1971: La Difficulté d’aimer, Gallimard
- 1972: Ossip Mandelstam, Seghers, series Poètes d'aujourd'hui
- 1973: Là où tu iras, La Table Ronde
- 1976: Les Cosmopolites, Gallimard
- 1979: Sporade (récits de voyage), Arthaud, series "Terre écrite"
- 1980: Marguerite Yourcenar, Seghers
- 1981: Gris du ciel, Gallimard
- 1984: Ivan Gontcharov ou le réalisme impossible, 1984
- 1984: La Montagne sainte, Albin Michel
- 1985: Tout l’été, Albin Michel
- 1988: Sainte Imposture, Albin Michel
- 1990:Si loin de Dieu et Autres Voyages, Albin Michel
- 1992: Bloomsbury, Histoire d’une sensibilité artistique et politique anglaise, Balland
- 1995: Albert Cohen ou Solal dans le siècle, Albin Michel
- 1995: Nabokov, Seuil, collection Écrivains de toujours
- 1998: Le Juif Margolin, Plon
- 2001: Moïse, notre contemporain, Albin Michel
- 2002: Roses d'Amérique, Balland
- 2005: Le soleil se couche à l’est, Éditions du Rocher
- 2008: Une vie à deux, le Rocher
- 2010: Le Roman, poésie de la prose, Champion
- 2012: Affaire de Cœur, Pierre-Guillaume de Roux
- 2015: Tout sera paysage, Gallimard

== Literary prizes ==
- 1977: Prix Valery-Larbaud for Les Cosmopolites.
- 1982: Prix Cazes brasserie Lipp for Gris du ciel.
- 1984: Prix Valentine de Wolmar for La Montagne sainte.
- 1985: Grand prix de la Critique littéraire for Ivan Gontcharov ou le réalisme impossible.
- 1986: Prix d'Académie for his lifetime achievement.

== Media ==
France Culture devoted five programs to him in 2012.

== Bibliography ==
- Comprendre, issue 28, 1964, p. 277
