= List of Asterix films =

This is a list of Asterix films.

== Films ==
=== Animation ===
Title	Traditional Animated Films								CGI Animated Films		
Title	Asterix the Gaul (1967)	Asterix and Cleopatra (1968)	The Twelve Tasks of Asterix (1976)	Asterix Versus Caesar (1985)	Asterix in Britain (1986)	Asterix and the Big Fight (1989)	Asterix Conquers America (1994)	Asterix and the Vikings (2006)	Asterix: The Mansions of the Gods (2014)	Asterix: The Secret of the Magic Potion (2018)	Asterix: The Kingdom of Nubia (2026)
Director	Ray Goossens; English: Lee Payant	René Goscinny; Albert Uderzo; English: Lee Payant	René Goscinny; Albert Uderzo; Pierre Watrin; Henri Gruel; English: Matt McCarthy	Gaëtan Brizzi; Paul Brizzi; English: Jacques Barclay	Pino van Lamsweerde; English: Jacques Barclay	Philippe Grimond; U.K. Dub: George Roubicek; U.S. Dub: David N. Weiss	Gerhard Hahn; English: Bill Speers	Stefan Fjeldmark; Jesper Møller; English: Jack Fletcher	Alexandre Astier; Louis Clichy; Canadian Dub: Karl Willems; U.K. Dub: Daniel Hubbard	Alexandre Astier; Louis Clichy; English: Karl Willems; Jack Cox	Alexandre Heboyan
Producer	Georges Dargaud	Raymond Leblanc	Georges Dargaud; René Goscinny; Albert Uderzo; English: Jacques de Lane Lea	Yannik Piel	Philippe Grimond; Yannik Piel	Yannick Piel; U.S. Dub: Helene Blitz	Gerhard Hahn and Jürgen Wohlrabe	Thomas Valentin	Philippe Bony; Thomas Valentin; Canadian Dub: Eric S. Rollman; U.K. Dub: Jon Clifford	Philippe Bony	
Writer	René Goscinny; Albert Uderzo; Willy Lateste; Jos Marissen; László Molnár (screenplay by)	Eddie Lateste; Jos Marissen; Pierre Tchernia adapted from René Goscinny; Albert Uderzo; English: Anthea Bell; Derek Hockridge	Pierre Tchernia adapted from René Goscinny and Albert Uderzo	Pierre Tchernia adapted from René Goscinny and Albert Uderzo; English: Edward Marcus	Pierre Tchernia adapted from René Goscinny and Albert Uderzo; English: Edward Marcus	Adolf Kabatek and Yannik Voight adapted from René Goscinny and Albert Uderzo; U.K. Dub: George Roubicek; U.S. Dub: David N. Weiss	Thomas Platt and Rhett Rooster adapted from René Goscinny and Albert Uderzo; English: Robin Lyons; Andrew Offiler; Bill Speers	Stefan Fjeldmark; Jean-Luc Goossens; English: Philip LaZebnik	Alexandre Astier adapted from René Goscinny and Albert Uderzo; Canadian Dub: Jessica Menendez; U.K. Dub: Robin Lyons; Andrew Offiler; Bill Speers	Alexandre Astier; English: Mariette Kelley; Joël Savdie	Matthieu Delaporte; Alexandre de La Patellière
Narrator	Bernard Lavalette; Bruce Johansen (English)		Pierre Tchernia; John Ringham (English)			Tony Jay (U.S. Dub)	John Rye; Pierre Tchernia (French); Harald Juhnke (German)	Jeff Bennett; Pierre Tchernia (French)			
Cinematography	Francois Léonard; Georges Lapeyronnie; Étienne Schürmann	Georges Lapeyronnie; Francois Léonard; Jean Midre									
Composer	Gérard Calvi			Vladimir Cosma		Michel Colombier	Harold Faltermeyer	Alexandre Azaria	Philippe Rombi		Romain Trouillet
Editor	Francois Ceppi; Jacques Marchel; Laszlo Molnar	Jacques Marchel; Laszlo Molnar	René Chaussy; Isabel García de Herreros; Minouche Gauzins; Michèle Neny	Monique Isnardon; Robert Isnardon	Monique Isnardon; Robert Isnardon	Jean Gaudier	Ulrich Steinvorth; Ringo Waldenburger	Martin Wichmann Andersen; Anders Hoffmann	Soline Guyonneau	Bertrand Maillard	
Production Companies	Dargaud Films		Dargaud Films; Les Productions René Goscinny; Studios Idéfix; Halas and Batchelor Cartoon Films	Dargaud Films Les Productions René Goscinny	Dargaud Films Les Productions René Goscinny	Dargaud Films; Extrafilm; Gaumont International	Extrafilm Produktion GmbH	A. Film A/SMandarin SAS 2D3D Animations	Belvision; Grid Animation; M6 Films	M6 Films	M6 Films; M6 Studio; Superprod Animation
Distributor	Athos Films; Associated British-Pathé (English)	Parafrance Films; Anglo-Amalgamated Film Distributors (English)	Gaumont; Cinema International Corporation (CIC) (English)	Gaumont; EMI Films (English)	Gaumont; EMI Films (English)	Gaumont; Castle Pictures (English)	Jugendfilm-Verleih (German); 20th Century Fox	SND Films; Optimum Releasing (English)	SND Films; Kaleidoscope Film Distribution (English)	SND Films; Icon Film Distribution (English)	SND Films
Released (France)	20 December 1967	19 December 1968	20 October 1976	11 December 1985	3 December 1986	4 October 1989	5 April 1995	12 April 2006	26 November 2014	5 December 2018	2 December 2026
Runtime	68 minutes	72 minutes	82 minutes	79 minutes	79 minutes	81 minutes	85 minutes	79 minutes	85 minutes	87 minutes	

=== English cast and characters ===
	Asterix the Gaul (1967)	Asterix and Cleopatra (1968)	The Twelve Tasks of Asterix (1976)	Asterix Versus Caesar (1985)	Asterix in Britain (1986)	Asterix and the Big Fight (1989)	Asterix Conquers America (1994)	Asterix and the Vikings (2006)	Asterix: The Mansions of the Gods (2014)	Asterix: The Secret of the Magic Potion (2018)
Gauls
Asterix	Lee Payant		Sean Barrett	Jack Beaber		Bill Oddie (U.K. Dub); Henry Winkler (U.S. Dub)	Craig Charles	Paul Giamatti	Ken Kramer (Canadian Dub); Jack Whitehall (U.K. Dub)	Ken Kramer
Obelix	Hal Brav		Michael Kilgarriff	Billy Kearns		Bernard Bresslaw (U.K. Dub); Rosey Grier (U.S. Dub)	Howard Lew Lewis	Brad Garrett	C. Ernst Harth (Canadian Dub); Nick Frost (U.K. Dub)	C. Ernst Harth
Dogmatix		Roger Carel						Dee Bradley Baker	Roger Carel	
Druid Getafix	John Prim		Geoffrey Russell	Robert Barr		Peter Hawkins (U.K. Dub); Danny Mann (U.S. Dub)	Geoffrey Bayldon	Jeff Bennett	John Innes	
Chief Vitalstatistix	Yves Brainville		Paul Bacon	Bertie Cortez	Allan Wenger	Douglas Blackwell (U.K. Dub); Greg Burson (U.S. Dub)	Jim Carter	Daran Norris	Don Brown (Canadian Dub); Matt Berry (U.K. Dub)	Don Brown
Cacofonix	François Valorbe		Geoffrey Russell			Tim Brooke-Taylor (U.K. Dub); Greg Burson (U.S. Dub)	Brian Greene	Jess Harnell	Alan Marriott	Andrew Cownden
Impedimenta			Ysanne Churchman		Judy-Rosen Martinez	Sheila Hancock (U.K. Dub); Lucille Bliss (U.S. Dub)	Julie Gibbs	Grey DeLisle	Saffron Henderson (Canadian Dub); Elizabeth Bower (U.K. Dub)	Saffron Henderson
Unhygienix			George Baker	Bill Doherty	Ken Starcevic	Kerry Shale (U.K. Dub); Ed Gilbert (U.S. Dub)	Jonathan Kydd	Diedrich Bader	Jason Simpson (Canadian Dub); Richard McCourt (U.K. Dub)	Jason Simpson
Bacteria						Kathryn Hurlbutt (U.K. Dub); Unknown (U.S. Dub)			Riley Kramer (Canadian Dub); Elizabeth Bower (U.K. Dub)	Saffron Henderson
Fulliautomatix			Sean Barrett	Steve Gadler		Sean Barrett (U.K. Dub); Bill Martin (U.S. Dub)	Jim Carter	John DeMita	Scott McNeil (Canadian Dub); Dominic Wood (U.K. Dub)	Scott McNeil
Geriatrix				Stuart Seide	Jerry Di Giacomo	Ian Thompson (U.K. Dub); Danny Mann (U.S. Dub)	Rupert Degas	Phil Proctor	Ron Halder	
Mrs. Geriatrix			Christina Greatrex			Kathryn Hurlbutt (U.K. Dub); Mona Marshall (U.S. Dub)				Rebecca Husain
Panacea				Patricia Kessler			Vanessa Feltz			
Romans
Julius Caesar	Steve Eckardt	Anthony Stuart	Alexander John	Gordon Heath			Henry McGee		Mark Oliver (Canadian Dub); Jim Broadbent (U.K. Dub)	Mark Oliver
Crismus Bonus	Steve Eckardt									
Centurion Somniferus									Jason Simpson (Canadian Dub); Greg Davies (U.K. Dub)	Jason Simpson
Tofungus									Sam Vincent	
Egyptians
Queen Cleopatra		Ginger Hall	Gennie Nevinson							
Edifis		George Birt								
Artifis		Alexandre Klimenko								
Pirates
Captain Redbeard		Arch Taylor			Patrick Floersheim		Jim Carter	Jack Fletcher		Aaron Chapman
Pegleg										Richard Newman
Pirate Lookout		Mezz Mezzrow			Thomas Pollard		Jim Carter	David Rasner		
Other characters
Narrator	Bruce Johansen		John Ringham			Tony Jay (U.S. Dub)	John Rye	Jeff Bennett		

1. 1967 – Asterix the Gaul (Astérix le Gaulois) with Roger Carel as Asterix and Jacques Morel as Obelix
2. 1968 – Asterix and Cleopatra (Astérix et Cléopâtre) with Roger Carel as Asterix and Jacques Morel as Obelix
3. 1976 – The Twelve Tasks of Asterix (Les Douze travaux d'Astérix) with Roger Carel as Asterix and Jacques Morel as Obelix
4. 1985 – Asterix Versus Caesar (Astérix et la surprise de César) with Roger Carel as Asterix and Pierre Tornade as Obelix
5. 1986 – Asterix in Britain (Astérix chez les Bretons) with Roger Carel as Asterix and Pierre Tornade as Obelix
6. 1989 – Asterix and the Big Fight (Astérix et le coup du menhir) (book of the film: Operation Getafix) with Roger Carel as Asterix and Pierre Tornade as Obelix
7. 1994 – Asterix Conquers America — produced in Germany as (Asterix in Amerika) with Craig Charles as Asterix and Howard Lew Lewis as Obelix
8. 2006 – Asterix and the Vikings (Astérix et les Vikings) with Paul Giamatti as Asterix and Brad Garrett as Obelix
9. 2014 – Asterix: The Mansions of the Gods (Astérix: Le Domaine des Dieux) with Roger Carel as Asterix and Guillaume Briat as Obelix
10. 2018 – Asterix: The Secret of the Magic Potion (Astérix: Le Secret de la potion magique) with Christian Clavier as Asterix and Guillaume Briat as Obelix
11. 2026 – Asterix: The Kingdom of Nubia (Astérix : Le Royaume de Nubie) with Christian Clavier as Asterix and François-Xavier Demaison as Obelix

=== Live-action ===
1. 1967 – Two Romans in Gaul (Deux Romains en Gaule) - a television film combining live action and animation; black & white and one hour long. Long considered unavailable, it was released on DVD in 2012.
2. 1999 – Asterix and Obelix Take on Caesar (Astérix et Obélix contre César) with Christian Clavier as Asterix and Gérard Depardieu as Obelix
3. 2002 – Asterix & Obelix: Mission Cleopatra (Astérix et Obélix : Mission Cléopâtre) with Christian Clavier as Asterix and Gérard Depardieu as Obelix
4. 2008 – Asterix at the Olympic Games (Astérix aux Jeux Olympiques) with Clovis Cornillac as Asterix and Gérard Depardieu as Obelix
5. 2012 – Asterix and Obelix: God Save Britannia (Astérix et Obélix : Au service de sa Majesté) with Édouard Baer as Asterix and Gérard Depardieu as Obelix
6. 2023 – Asterix & Obelix: The Middle Kingdom (Astérix et Obélix : l'Empire du milieu) with Guillaume Canet as Asterix and Gilles Lellouche as Obelix

== History ==
- No novelizations were made for Asterix the Gaul, Asterix in Britain or Asterix and Cleopatra which followed the original albums relatively closely.
- In 1967, there was an attempt to make an animated film based on Asterix and the Golden Sickle, which was not completed. The incomplete script and drawings were sold in a book-exhibition in Brussels and is today a part of the book The Mirror World of Asterix. Another reason for its failure is that Goscinny and Uderzo rejected the artists from releasing this movie because of its low-quality drawings.
- The Twelve Tasks of Asterix is the only animated movie not based (at least loosely) on any of the comic books until the 2018 film The Secret of the Magic Potion.
- Starting from 1985's Asterix Versus Caesar the animation quality improved dramatically.
- Asterix Conquers America was the only one produced solely outside France.
- Early English dubbed versions of cartoon movies used character names from the Ranger/Look and Learn "Asterix the Briton" translations, such as Tunabrix for the village chieftain.
- Asterix Conquers America, Asterix and the Vikings and Asterix: The Mansions of the Gods are digitally drawn and animated.
- Asterix: The Mansions of the Gods is the first Asterix movie in stereoscopic 3D.
- The animated Asterix movies that were dubbed into English were all dubbed in either France, the United Kingdom or Germany, with the exception of Asterix and the Vikings, where it was then dubbed in the United States, in order to bring Asterix into the U.S. market, while The Mansion of the Gods and The Secret of the Magic Potion were dubbed by Ocean Productions in Canada. A North American dub of Asterix and the Big Fight is used in all DVD releases, but fans generally consider it inferior to the original British dub, which is only available on VHS.
- Asterix Conquers America and Asterix and the Vikings are the only animated Asterix films to be produced in English first, then dubbed into French.
- Though several of the Asterix comics are available in the United States, most of the Asterix films have not seen releases in America, likely due to the comics being not as popular as in the United Kingdom. The first five films (Asterix the Gaul, Asterix and Cleopatra, The Twelve Tasks of Asterix, Asterix and Caesar and Asterix in Britain) did see VHS releases through Walt Disney Studios Home Entertainment and Just for Kids Home Video, but all five have since gone out of print.

== See also ==
- List of films based on French-language comics
