= Asterix in Britain (film) =

1986 film by Pino Van Lamsweerde

- French theatrical release poster
- Astérix chez les Bretons
- Directed by: Pino van Lamsweerde
- Written by: Pierre Tchernia
- Based on: Asterix in Britain by René Goscinny; Albert Uderzo
- Produced by: Philippe Grimond; Yannik Piel
- Starring: Roger Carel; Pierre Tornade; Graham Bushnell; Pierre Mondy; Maurice Risch; Roger Lumont; Nicolas Silberg
- Music by: Vladimir Cosma
- Production companies: Dargaud Films; Les Productions René Goscinny; Gutenberghus
- Distributed by: Gaumont Distribution
- Release date: December 3, 1986
- Running time: 79 minutes
- Countries: France; Denmark
- Language: French

Asterix in Britain (French: Astérix chez les Bretons) is a 1986 French-Danish animated film, directed by Pino van Lamsweerde, written by Pierre Tchernia, produced by Dargaud Films and Les Productions René Goscinny, and released on December 3, 1986. The film is the fifth adaptation of a story from the Asterix comic series, and is based upon the plot from the graphic novel of the same name by René Goscinny and Albert Uderzo. The film's plot focuses on Asterix and Obelix transporting a barrel of Magic Potion to a rebel village of Britons, as they attempt to hold out against the Romans. The original French release starred Roger Carel and Pierre Tornade in the lead roles, while the English release starred Jack Beaber and Billy Kearns.

== Plot ==
Julius Caesar successfully conquers all of Britain, unaware that one rebel village still holds out. Sensing they too will soon succumb, villager Anticlimax travels to Gaul to find his cousin Asterix and secure some of the magic potion the Gauls use to hold back the Romans. The druid Getafix obligingly supplies a barrel of potion. Vitalstatistix assigns Asterix and Obelix, accompanied by Dogmatix, to transport it to Britain. While crossing the English Channel, the group rescue a Phoenician merchant from pirates, who rewards Asterix with a bag of mysterious herbs. Obelix is delighted to also encounter and board a Roman galley to satisfy his need for a fight.

Roman officer Stratocumulus, a passenger on the galley, overhears Obelix describe their mission. He warns the head of the British Roman command in Londinium, General Motus. The Gauls find the Romans on high alert, and hide out in an inn belonging to Gaulix, an expatriate Gaul. Motus orders all barrels in Londinium confiscated and the Romans unknowingly take the barrel of magic potion when Gaulix's wine is seized. The Gauls recover it thanks to a Roman legion getting drunk tasting every barrel in the city for the magic potion. A drunken Obelix waylays a Roman patrol while they escape with Gaulix's barrels, allowing a thief to steal them.

Asterix and Anticlimax rescue Obelix and Gaulix from the Romans and pursue the thief. Their barrel was sold to a druid due to umpire a rugby match. The group reclaims it as the Romans close in, and make for a rowboat to reach Anticlimax's village. Stratocumulus intercepts them and sinks their rowboat, destroying the barrel in the process. Motus orders his forces to attack the rebel Briton village the next day. Asterix leads the group to Anticlimax's village and concocts his own potion of hot water infused with the Phoenician herbs. The Britons drink it and find the courage needed to defeat the Romans. Anticlimax's chief declares Asterix's 'potion' will become the national drink for the Britons.

Asterix and Obelix return home and enjoy a banquet to celebrate their latest adventure. Getafix tells Asterix the herbs are tea.

== Cast ==
Character	Original	English Dub
Asterix	Roger Carel	Jack Beaber
Dogmatix	Roger Carel	Roger Carel
Obelix	Pierre Tornade	Billy Kearns
Anticlimax	Graham Bushnell	Graham Bushnell
Totalapsus	Pierre Mondy	Herbert Baskind
Chateaupetrus	Maurice Risch	James Shuman
Stratocumulus	Roger Lumont	Edward Marcus
General Motus	Nicolas Silberg	Sean O'Neil
Captain Redbeard	Michel Gatineau	Patrick Floersheim
Fulliautomatix	Michel Gatineau	Steve Gadler (Blacksmix)
Getafix	Henri Labussière	Robert Watson Barr
Vitalstatistix	Henri Poirier	Allan Wenger (uncredited)
Julius Caesar	Serge Sauvion	Gordon Heath
Pirate Lookout	Joseph Ny'Ambi	Thomas Pollard (uncredited)
Ekonomikrisis	Albert Augier	Ken Starcevic
Mr. Fiddlesticks	Gerard Croce	Mike Marshall
Wine Seller	Michel Gatineau	Peter Hudson
Olive Market aka Gaulix	Pierre Mirat	Peter Hudson
English Chief Mykingdomforanos	Georges Atlas (uncredited)	Peter Hudson
Unhygienix	Yves Barsacq (uncredited)	Ken Starcevic
Impedimenta	Martine Messager	Judy Martinez (Instantmix)
Beer Seller	Alain Doutey	Jerry Di Giacomo (uncredited)
Geriatrix	Guy Piérauld (uncredited)	Jerry Di Giacomo (uncredited)
Phoenician Sailor	Michel Elias	Unknown
Legionnaire	Michel Elias	Unknown
The English	Martine Messager	Unknown

=== Additional voices ===
- Original: Paul Bisciglia, Bertie Cortez, Ian Marschall, Judy Martinez, Edward Marcus, Laurence Riesner, Christopher Wells

== See also ==
- List of Asterix films
