= Asterix Versus Caesar =

1985 film by Paul and Gaëtan Brizzi

- Theatrical release poster
- Astérix et la surprise de César
- Directed by: Gaëtan Brizzi; Paul Brizzi
- Written by: Pierre Tchernia
- Based on: Asterix the Gladiator; Asterix the Legionary by René Goscinny; Albert Uderzo
- Produced by: Yannik Piel
- Starring: Roger Carel; Pierre Tornade; Pierre Mondy; Serge Sauvion; Henri Labussière; Roger Lumont
- Edited by: Monique Isnardon; Robert Isnardon
- Music by: Vladimir Cosma
- Production companies: Dargaud Films; Les Productions René Goscinny
- Distributed by: Gaumont Distribution
- Release date: December 11, 1985
- Running time: 74 minutes
- Country: France
- Language: French

Asterix Versus Caesar (French: Astérix et la surprise de César) is a 1985 French animated adventure comedy film, written by René Goscinny, Albert Uderzo and Pierre Tchernia, produced by Dargaud Films and Les Productions René Goscinny, and released in France originally in December 11, 1985. The film's story sees Asterix and his friend Obelix set off to rescue two lovers from their village that have been kidnapped by the Romans.

The film is the fourth film adaptation of the Asterix comic book series, but features an original story combining the plots of Asterix the Gladiator and Asterix the Legionary, both written by Goscinny. The film's main theme song, Astérix est là, was composed and performed by Plastic Bertrand. A book of the film, containing stills, was released following the film's release, and was later reprinted by Orion Publishing when it re-released the entire comic series.

== Plot ==
To honour Julius Caesar's successful campaigns of conquest, gifts are brought to Rome from across the Roman Empire and Caesar orders Caius Fatuous, head of a prominent gladiator school, to provide him with a grand show. In Gaul Asterix notices his friend Obelix has begun acting strangely. Getafix reveals he is in love with Panacea, Chief Vitalstatistix's niece. Attempting to win her affection, Obelix becomes distraught when she is reunited with Tragicomix, a younger and handsome man (the son of a neighbouring chieftain) who intends to marry her. Seeking to spend time together, the two lovers venture out into nearby woods, only to be ambushed by a group of Romans, led by a fresh recruit hoping to make a good impression.

When Asterix and Obelix discover what happened, they inform the village, who proceed to attack the garrison. In the aftermath, the camp's Centurion is questioned. He reveals that he angrily ordered the recruit to take his prisoners away, knowing of the consequences that the recruit's actions would bring. Asterix and Obelix, joined by Dogmatix, proceed to the nearest Legion HQ for information on where the recruit went. Upon learning he was dispatched to a distant outpost in the Sahara Desert with his prisoners, they joined the army in order to follow after them. Arriving at the desert frontier, the pair learn that Panacea and Tragicomix escaped from the Romans before their arrival, and after deserting the Romans, soon discover that a band of slave traders found them and sold them on to Rome.

Securing passage to the Roman capital, Asterix and Obelix learn that Panacea and Tragicomix were bought by Caius. The pair attempt to meet with him at a bathhouse, causing Caius to witness them beating up his bodyguards easily. Impressed, he orders his men to capture them for his show. Following a small argument with his friend that causes him to misplace his magic potion, Asterix is kidnapped by Caius' men. When Obelix discovers he is missing, he proceeds to seek him out, rescuing him from a flooded cell. However Dogmatix goes missing, after running off into the city's sewers to recover the magic potion. Without both, the pair continue to seek out Panacea and Tragicomix and quickly learn that, under Caesar's orders, Caius arranged for them to become the grand finale of the emperor's show at the Colosseum.

Seeking to gain entry, the pair go to Caius' school and secure places as gladiators the following day. The Gauls soon quickly make a mess of the show, winning a chariot race and easily beating down a number of gladiators. As lions are released to kill them, alongside Tragicomix and Panacea, Dogmatix arrives with the magic potion. The group defeat the lions with the potion, while Obelix, distracted by Panacea, accidentally shatters a third of the Colosseum. Impressed with the show, Caesar grants the Gauls their freedom and gets Caius fed to the lions in their place. Returning home, the group arrive to their village's trademark victory feast being held in their honour. As the villagers celebrate, Asterix sits alone in a tree, after having somewhat fallen for Panacea on his return.

== Cast ==
| Character | Original | English Dub |
|---|---|---|
| Asterix | Roger Carel | Jack Beaber |
| Dogmatix | Roger Carel | Roger Carel |
| Obelix | Pierre Tornade | Billy Kearns |
| Caius Fatuous | Pierre Mondy | Allan Wenger (Caius Flabius) |
| Julius Caesar | Serge Sauvion | Gordon Heath |
| Getafix | Henri Labussière | Robert Watson Barr |
| Insalubrius | Roger Lumont | Patrick Floersheim (Dubious Status) |
| Vitalstatistix | Jean-Pierre Darras | Bertie Cortez |
| Panacea | Séverine Morisot | Patricia Kessler |
| Panacea | Danielle Licari (singing) | Danielle Licari (singing) |
| Nefarius Purpus | Henri Poirier | Edward Marcus (uncredited) Arch Taylor |
| Incautius | Patrick Préjean | James Shuman |
| Felix Platypus | Michel Barbet | Jerry Di Giacomo (Garrulus Rumpus) |
| Terminus | Pierre Tchernia | Sean O'Neil |
| Roman Cook | Pierre Mirat | Arch Taylor |
| Coliseum Announcer | José Luccioni | Paul Barrett |
| Hasan Ben Washed | Philippe Dumat | Mostéfa Stiti |
| Desert Bandit | Michel Gatineau | Ken Starcevic |
| Caius Fatuous' Bodyguard | Michel Gatineau | Robert Ground |
| Roman in the Desert Camp | Henri Poirier | Thomas M. Pollard |
| Tragicomix | Thierry Ragueneau | Mike Marshall |
| Presenter of Gifts | Nicolas Silberg | Pierre Semmler |
| Pedus Gonzalez | Paul Bisciglia | Raphael Rodriguez |
| Whosemoralsarelastix | Martin Lamotte (uncredited) | Herbert Baskind (Selectivemploymentax) |
| Fulliautomatix | Alain Doutey | Steve Gadler |
| Geriatrix | Roger Carel (uncredited) | Stuart Seide |
| Unhygienix | Unknown | William Doherty |
| The Roman at the canteen who serves the food | Gérard Croce | Unknown |
| Faupayélatax | Alain Doutey | Unknown |
| The Goth | Paul Mercey | Unknown |

=== Additional Voices ===
- Original: Yves Barsacq, Edmond Bernard, Peter Wollasch
- English Dub: Bill Dunn, Christian Erickson, Norman Stokle, Derry Hall

=== Uncredited ===
- Original: Alain Coutey (Additional Voices), Roger Barbet (Additional Voices)

== Home media ==
In 1990, the film was released on VHS by Celebrity Home Entertainment. In 2006, the film was released on Region 2 DVD as a part of a box set of animated Asterix films.

=== Television ===
In the United Kingdom, it was watched by 320,000 viewers on television during the first half of 2005, making it the ninth most-watched foreign-language film on UK television during that period.

== See also ==
- List of Asterix films
