= Asterix and Cleopatra (film) =

- Original release poster
- Astérix et Cléopâtre
- Directed by: René Goscinny; Albert Uderzo
- Screenplay by: Eddie Lateste; Jos Marissen; Pierre Tchernia
- Based on: Asterix and Cleopatra by René Goscinny; Albert Uderzo
- Produced by: Raymond Leblanc
- Starring: Roger Carel; Jacques Morel; Micheline Dax; Pierre Tornade; Lucien Raimbourg
- Narrated by: Bernard Lavalette
- Cinematography: Georges Lapeyronnie; Francois Léonard; Jean Midre
- Edited by: Jacques Marchel; László Molnár
- Music by: Gérard Calvi
- Production companies: Dargaud Films; Belvision
- Distributed by: Pathé; La Société des Films Sirius; Gaumont Distribution
- Release date: 19 December 1968
- Running time: 72 minutes
- Countries: France; Belgium
- Language: French

Asterix and Cleopatra (French: Astérix et Cléopâtre) is a 1968 French-Belgian animated comedy film; it is the second Asterix adventure to be made into a feature film. Overseen by Asterix creators Rene Goscinny and Albert Uderzo (who had no involvement in the production of the first film, Asterix the Gaul and in their director debuts), the film is noticeably more well-produced than its predecessor, featuring far more detailed animation and a more polished soundtrack.

Asterix and Cleopatra is practically a musical, featuring three individual song sequences and a more varied score than the earlier film. Elements of satire and surreal humour (such as Cleopatra's singing lion and the engraving of Santa Claus on the pyramid wall) are prominent throughout.

== Plot ==
After a heated argument with Julius Caesar over his lack of faith in the Egyptian people, Queen Cleopatra enters into a bet claiming she can have a magnificent palace constructed for him in Alexandria within three months. She gives this task to her best architect Numerobis, informing him he'll be covered with gold if he succeeds or thrown to the crocodiles if he fails. Daunted and distraught, believing the task to be insurmountable without some sort of magic, Numerobis travels to Gaul to seek help from the famous druid Panoramix.

Panoramix returns to Egypt with Numerobis accompanied by Asterix, and Obelix who insists Idefix join the voyage against objections from Asterix. Numerobis' encounters a pirate ship, which is boarded by Asterix and Obelix, then scuttled after a one-sided fight. In Egypt it becomes clear Numerobis isn't a gifted architect. His scheming rival Amonbofis proposes they collaborate to build Caesar's palace on time and divide the reward. Numerobis refuses and Amonbofis swears vengeance, angered further by the injuries he sustains while negotiating Numerobis' poorly built house which later collapses.

Amonbofis convinces the construction workers they're being exploited by Numerobis and encourages them to strike. Panoramix gives the workers his magic potion which enables the work to continue effortlessly and progress is so rapid the labourers exhaust their supplies of stone. Amonbofis bribes the supplier to dump the subsequent shipment into the Nile, forcing the Gauls to escort a fleet of ships to fetch more. Sightseeing en route, the trio's visit to the Pyramids at Giza is interrupted by Amonbofis' sidekick Krukhut, who poses as a guide and gets them lost inside the Great Pyramid. The Gauls fail to negotiate the maze, but are rescued by Idefix who expertly tracks them. Undeterred, Amonbofis and Krukhut hire the pirates seen earlier to attack the fleet on its return to Alexandria. This second encounter with the pirates alleviates Obelix's boredom, despite their cowardly attempt at retreat.

In a final effort to stop the three Gauls, Amonbofis frames them for attempting to poison Cleopatra with a poisoned cake. Asterix, Obelix and Panoramix are thrown into the dungeon after the Queen's taster becomes ill. Panoramix carries an antidote that enables them to eat the remainder of the cake to convince the queen it was harmless, and cure the taster. The Gauls are pardoned and capture Amonbofis and Krukhut who are sentence to work for Numerobis as labourers.

Cleopatra gloats over the likelihood of winning her bet while Caesar fears losing face and instructs his spy to infiltrate the building site. Learning the Gauls and their magic potion are involved, Caesar orders three mercenaries to kidnap Panoramix and knock over the cauldron. After capturing Panoramix one of the mercenaries drinks the potion, knocks over the cauldron, and overpowers the other two who are caught by Asterix and Obelix. Panoramix is delivered to Caesar and imprisoned, but freed by Asterix and Obelix. In desperation, Caesar places the construction site under siege and bombards the unfinished palace with boulders. Cleopatra intervenes after Asterix advises her of Caesar's actions, forcing Caesar to lift the siege. The palace is completed on schedule, Numerobis is honoured, and the Gauls are escorted home aboard Cleopatra's luxury ship.

== Cast ==
Character	Original	English Dub
Asterix	Roger Carel	Lee Payant
Dogmatix	Roger Carel	Roger Carel
Mintjulep	Roger Carel	George Keros
Obelix	Jacques Morel	Hal Brav
Getafix	Lucien Raimbourg	John Primm
Julius Caesar	Jean Parédès	Anthony Stuart
Edifis	Pierre Tornade	George Birt
Vitalstatistix	Pierre Tornade	Yves Brainville
Captain Redbeard	Pierre Trabaud	Arch Taylor
Centurion Operachorus	Pierre Trabaud	Edward Marcus
Sethisbackup	Pierre Trabaud	Alexandre Klimenko
Cleopatra	Micheline Dax	Ginger Hall
Krukhut	Jacques Balutin	Jean Fontaine
Artifis	Bernard Lavalette	Alexandre Klimenko
Narrator	Bernard Lavalette	Bruce Johansen
Cleopatra's Lion	Jacques Bodoin	Jacques Bodoin
Cacofonix	Jacques Jouanneau	François Valorbe
Commentator	René Goscinny (uncredited)	Michael Brown
Parrot	Gérard Darrieu	Paula D'Alba
Pirate Lookout	Roger Carel	Mezz Mezzrow
Mercenaries	Claude Dasset	Lyle Joyce
Mercenaries	Pierre Tornade	Colin Drake
Mercenaries	Rodolphe Marcilly	Steve Waring
Cleopatra's Taster	Jacques Morel	John Rounds
Dromedary	Eddy Rasimi	Derry Hall
Quarry Supervisor	Pierre Trabaud	Derry Hall
Listless Worker	Joe Noël	Bruce Johansen
Criers in Bathroom	Pierre Garin	Patrick O'Hara
Criers in Bathroom	Fred Personne	Lyle Joyce
Servant of Caesar	Olivier Hussenot	James Shuman
Guardian	Maurice Chevit	James Shuman

== Reception ==
In the United Kingdom, the film was watched by 600,000 viewers on television in 2004, making it the year's second most-watched European-language film on television.

== See also ==
- List of Asterix films
- Asterix and Obelix: Mission Cleopatra - A live action adaptation starring Gerard Depardieu, Monica Bellucci, and Christian Clavier
- Gabiniani - Germanic and Gaulish soldiers in Ptolemaic Egypt during the reigns of Cleopatra VII and her father Ptolemy XII Auletes
