= Oumpah-pah =

1958–1962 French comic book series

- Oumpah-pah discovers the wig of a French aristocrat whom he subsequently dubs Two-Scalp.

Publication information
- Genre: Humor, historical
- Publication date: 1958–1962

Creative team
- Created by: René Goscinny, Albert Uderzo

Oumpah-pah le Peau-Rouge (Ompa-pa the Redskin) is a comics series created by comics artist Albert Uderzo and comics author René Goscinny, best known as the creators of Asterix. The series first appeared in the weekly Tintin magazine in 1958 though it remained serialised for a relatively short time, ending in 1962. The stories were published in book form by Lombard and Dargaud starting in 1961. In 1995, the series was reissued by Albert Uderzo's own publishing house, Éditions Albert René.

== Characters ==
The series features the adventures of Ompa-pa (Oumpah-pah in French – the name referring to a waltz), a Native American of the fictional Flatfeet tribe, and his friend, the French officer Hubert Brussels Sprout (Hubert de la Pâte Feuilletée in French, which translates as Hubert of Puff Pastry), whom Ompa-pa calls Two-scalp, a reference to his wig.

The series is set in the 18th century during the age of French colonization in America. Ompa-pa is strong and quick, and loves to eat pemmican. He is an honest and trustworthy brave whose simple heroism is comparable to that of the more famous Asterix, whom Uderzo and Goscinny later created. Hubert Brussels Sprout, whom the Flatfeet initially hold as a prisoner, subsequently serves as a mediator between the Europeans and the Native Americans, and is also an ally against the tribe known as the Sockitoomee, the sworn enemies of the Flatfeet.

When Brussels Sprout introduces Ompa-pa as his brother, his commanding officer remarks: "When madam the Marquise your mother hears about this..."

The character Ompa-pa makes a cameo appearance in the 1976 Asterix film The Twelve Tasks of Asterix, though this story is set in pre-Columbian America.

== Publication history ==
Goscinny and Uderzo met in 1951 and were seated next to each other at the Paris office of World Press, where they first began their collaboration, inventing the characters Ompa-pa, Jehan Pistolet and Luc Junior. Ompa-pa was the very first character created by Uderzo and Goscinny, but initially failed to raise the interest of any publisher. While he was staying in the United States for professional reasons, Goscinny unsuccessfully tried to have the first version of the comic published in English. (Harvey Kurtzman may have worked on the English translation.) The idea remained shelved for several years until the concept was adapted for publication in the Franco-Belgian comics magazine Tintin. The finished series made its debut on April 2, 1958.

Goscinny and Uderzo ultimately decided to end the series early, in order to focus their energies on the more popular Asterix character.

The series was published in English under the title Ompa-Pa in the UK in 1977–78, in a translation by Nicholas Fry.

== Bibliography ==
=== Serialised stories ===
- Oumpah-pah le Peau-Rouge, 02 April 1958-09 July 1958 (Oumpah-pah the Redskin)
- Oumpah-pah sur le sentier de la guerre, 26 November 1958-27 May 1959 (Oumpah-pah on the Warpath)
- Oumpah-pah et les pirates, 03 June 03 1959-09 September 1959 (Oumpah-pah and the Pirates)
- Mission secrète, 1960 (Secret Mission)
- Oumpah-pah contre Foie-Malade, 1962 (Oumpah-pah against Liver Sick)

=== Albums ===
Ompa-pa and Brother Two Scalp, the first book in the series.

(Les Éditions du Lombard, Brussels, published simultaneously in France by Dargaud Éditeur, Paris)

1. Oumpah-pah le Peau-Rouge, including Oumpah-pah sur le sentier de la guerre (1961)
2. Oumpah-pah et les pirates, including Mission secrète (1962)
3. Oumpah-pah contre Foie-Malade (1967)

Reissues by Les Éditions Albert René

1. Oumpah-Pah le Peau-Rouge, including an introduction and a reprint of the 1951 U.S. pilot (1995)
2. Vol. 2, including Oumpah-Pah sur le sentier de la guerre and Oumpah-Pah et les pirates (1996)
3. Vol. 3, including Mission secrète and Oumpah-pah contre Foie-Malade (1997)

English translation by Nicholas Fry (Egmont/Methuen, London)

1. Ompa-Pa and Brother Two Scalp (1977)
2. Ompa-Pa Saves the Day (1977)
3. Ompa-Pa and the Pirates (1977)
4. Ompa-Pa and the Secret Mission (1978)
5. Ompa-Pa and the Prussians (1978)

== Sources ==
- Oumpah-pah publications in Belgian Tintin Archived 2007-03-26 at the Wayback Machine, French Tintin Archived 2007-09-30 at the Wayback Machine BDoubliées (in French)
- Oumpah-pah albums Bedetheque (in French)
