= Le Viager =

1972 French film

- Directed by: Pierre Tchernia
- Written by: René Goscinny (scénario et dialogue); Pierre Tchernia (scénario et dialogue)
- Starring: Michel Serrault; Michel Galabru; Claude Brasseur
- Cinematography: Jean Tournier
- Edited by: Isabel García de Herreros; Françoise Javet
- Music by: Gérard Calvi
- Color process: Eastmancolor
- Production companies: Les Films Dargaud; Les Productions Artistes Associés
- Distributed by: Les Artistes Associés
- Release date: 19 January 1972
- Running time: 102 minutes
- Country: France
- Language: French

Le Viager is a 1972 French comedy film directed by Pierre Tchernia and starring Michel Serrault, Michel Galabru and Claude Brasseur, adapted from a script by René Goscinny, the creator of the Asterix comics.

== Plot ==
In 1930 in Paris, Dr Léon Galipeau examines 59-year-old Louis Martinet. Convinced that his patient has a maximum of two years to live, Galipeau convinces his brother Emile to use a 'viager' (life annuity) to buy Martinet's lovely country house in the fishing village of Saint-Tropez (at the time, St-Tropez was not the world renowned destination it is today). The 'viager' is a French system whereby someone buys a house from a person, repaying them by instalments until the person's death, only upon which the house finally transfers to the buyer. Thanks to Martinet's declining health, the Galipeau expect to not pay for long and get his house for cheap.

Thinking Dr Galipeau is right, despite the fact that the doctor is always wrong whenever he says something (a running gag throughout the movie), Emile, under the advice of the notary dealing with the life annuity contract, accepts to index the 'viager' each year following the course of aluminium - a popular investment in the 1930s. The Galipeau believe that, even if aluminium's value goes up, it will not amount to much since they expect Martinet to die within a couple years.

Despite Dr Galipeau's repeated claims that Martinet will soon die, as the years go by the elderly Martinet gets better and better, and the price of the 'viager' keeps getting higher due to aluminium's value constant increase. Finally fed up with this elderly who won't die and after seeing the annuity they must pay go through the roof, the Galipeau family (Léon, his wife Marguerite, Emile and his wife Elvire) decide to get rid of Martinet themselves.

In 1940, the early years of WWII, an attempt to make Martinet pass for a German spy is foiled by bad timing, as it happens on the day of France's surrender. In 1943, they try to make Martinez pass for a Gaullist and a Résistant. Unfortunately for the Galipeau, the letter is not delivered until the Libération, upon which their letter allows Martinet to become a decorated hero as everyone now believes he was a Resistant. A few years later, during a visit of Martinet to Paris, the Galipeau attempt to take advantage of Martinet's old age by making him have a heart attack. They spend the day visiting monuments where they must climb hundreds of steps, they try to lose Martinet in Paris' Catacombs and also have him overeat, overdrink and smoke a lot by taking him to several restaurants and bars throughout Paris. This proves fruitless as the boy is perfectly healthy and more than happy to climb steps (he even counts them for his personal enjoyment), smoke, eat and drink like there is no tomorrow. Their day ends with the group rushing to the station for Martinet to catch his train back to St-Tropez. In a reversal of fortune, Marguerite dies of exhaustion from their day of excessive activity on the platform as the train departs.

The years go by, Martinet seems to be tireless. He becomes even more popular locally as he performs shows in St-Tropez as the village slowly grows famous thanks to celebrities coming there. Not willing to give up and after having trouble paying for the annuity, Emile decides to murder Martinet. He invites him for a trip on a paddle boat out to sea where he schemes to shoot him and ditch his body in the water, planning to tell everyone Martinet fell and drowned as a cover-up story. Once again, this plan is foiled as the paddle boat breaks down, prompting Martinet to swim back to shore for help, leaving Emile (who does not know how to swim) alone on the paddle boat. Unfortunately, the manager of the paddle boat rental happens to be Captain Bucigny-Dumaine, the military man to whom the Galipeau tried to denounce Martinet twice during the war (As a result of these two botched denunciations, Bucigny-Dumaine was revoked from the military and now despises the Galipeau whom he blames for it). While pretending to rescue him, the Captain tries to murder Emile but gets shot dead in the process, while Emile falls from the paddle boat and drowns (As their bodies are never found, Martinet never knows Emile had a gun and was here to shoot him).

Several years later, Martinet, now in his 80s, contracts influenza. Hoping to finally see him die, the remaining Galipeau plotters, Léon and Elvire, visit him in the hospital where they find him healed and enjoying life. Under the disguise of cleaning his house before his return from hospital, Léon and Elvire sabotage the place to have Martinet fall down the stairs of the balcony to his death. The plan backfires : Elvire dies and Léon ends up in hospital.

A few years later, Noël (Emile and Elvire's son and Léon's nephew) is now in his late 30s and earns a living by stealing from homes. He ends up under arrest and, as the tribunal is about to sentence him, Martinet (willing to help the Galipeau as he still has not figured out they tried to kill him) shows up and his moving speech saves Noël from prison. Upon hearing the verdict, Léon dies of a heart attack in the tribunal.

Finally, the last remaining member of the Galipeau family, Noël enrolls two criminal friends as hitmen to kill Martinet while he stages a fireworks show for the old man's 100th birthday as a distraction. However, the fireworks detonate early, killing Noël while Martinet enjoys the show, not realizing what just happened.

The film concludes with Martinet, now over 100, contemplating his flourishing, sun-bathed garden and wondering if the grove is that beautiful because the Galipeau are watching over him. He pictures the whole Galipeau family, dressed in white, enjoying life in the garden alongside him, never realizing they all died trying to murder him.

== Cast ==
- Michel Serrault as Louis Martinet
- Michel Galabru as Léon Galipeau
- Claude Brasseur as Noël Galipeau à 39 ans
- Rosy Varte as Elvire Galipeau
- Odette Laure as Marguerite Galipeau
- Jean-Pierre Darras as Emile Galipeau
- Yves Robert as Bucigny-Dumaine (le bel officier)
- Jean Richard as Jo (un voyou)
- Madeleine Clervanne as La grand-mère Galipeau
- Noël Roquevert as La grand-père Galipeau
- Jacques Bodoin as Maître Laguarrigue, l'honnête notaire
- Gérard Depardieu as Victor, le complice de Jo
- Bernard Lavalette as Le député-maire de Saint-Tropez
- Claude Legros as Lucien, le brave facteur
- Jean Carmet as Maître Vierzon, l'avocat de Noël
- René Aranda as Himself (as Rene Aranda)
- Yves Barsacq as Un officier de gendarmerie
- Robert Berri as Un invité du préfet de police
- Philippe Castelli L'artiste de cabaret
- Raoul Curet as Le projectionniste
- Luc Diaz as Noël á dix ans
- Jean Franval as Himself
- Jacques Hilling as Le président du tribunal
- Gabriel Jabbour as M. Levasseur, le patron de Martinet
- Roger Lumont as Le général Von Schwarzenberg
- Antoinette Moya as Angèle, la femme du facteur
- Jacques Préboist as Le factionnaire-hallebardier
- Edmond Ardisson as Le chef du train
- Joëlle Bernard as La prostituée
- Béatrice Chatelier as La pulpeuse infirmière
- Elisabeth Dulac as La cheftaine scout belge
- Henri-Jacques Huet as Le chef du maquis
- Alain Lionel as Le médecin de l'hôpital
- Jean Michaud as Le procureur
- André Randel as Le trompettiste
- René Renot as Jeannot
- Guy Verda as Le photographe du centenaire
- Roger Carel as La voix du speaker des actualités (voice)
- Claude Dasset as La voix du speaker de la radio (voice)
- Nathalie Serrault as La voix de la petite fille (voice) (as Nathalie)
