= The Twelve Tasks of Asterix =

1976 English/French animated film

- Original theatrical release poster
- Les Douze Travaux d'Astérix
- Directed by: René Goscinny; Albert Uderzo; Pierre Watrin; Henri Gruel
- Screenplay by: Pierre Tchernia; René Goscinny; Albert Uderzo
- Based on: Asterix by: René Goscinny; Albert Uderzo
- Produced by: Georges Dargaud; René Goscinny; Albert Uderzo
- Starring: Roger Carel; Jacques Morel; Jean Martinelli
- Narrated by: Pierre Tchernia
- Edited by: René Chaussy; Isabel García de Herreros; Minouche Gauzins; Michèle Neny
- Music by: Gérard Calvi
- Production companies: Studios Idéfix; Dargaud Films; Les Productions René Goscinny; Halas and Batchelor
- Distributed by: Gaumont Distribution
- Release dates: 12 March 1976 (Austria); 20 October 1976 (France)
- Running time: 82 minutes
- Countries: France; United Kingdom
- Language: French
- Box office: 9.4 million tickets

The Twelve Tasks of Asterix (French: Les Douze Travaux d'Astérix) is a 1976 French-British animated surreal comedy film, written and directed by René Goscinny and Albert Uderzo, produced by Dargaud Films and Studios Idéfix, and distributed by Gaumont. It is the third animated film based on the Asterix comic book series, while the first to feature an original story by Goscinny and Uderzo, the series' creators, and is the only Asterix film to be produced using xerography animation techniques.

The film's plot revolves around Asterix and Obelix attempting to complete a series of tough challenges set by Julius Caesar, who seeks to prove they and their fellow villagers are not gods. The film starred Roger Carel, and Jacques Morel; while the English cast included Sean Barrett, and Geoffrey Russell.

The Twelve Tasks of Asterix received mixed reviews regarding the tone of the story and frequent breaks in the fourth wall, but gained popularity over the years to later be considered one of the best Asterix films, achieving the status of a cult classic. The story was later adapted into a comic book by Marcel Uderzo, Albert Uderzo's brother, though was not widely distributed and was not incorporated into the Asterix series; an illustrated book of the film was more widely published in multiple languages than the comic adaptation.

== Plot ==
Following constant defeats by the rebel Gauls in Armorica, the Roman Senate slowly begin to believe they may be gods, due to their apparent invincibility. Julius Caesar, openly disdainful of the suggestion, decides to test the village and meets with their chieftain, Vitalstatistix. Caesar declares that the Gauls must undertake a challenge, inspired by the Twelve Labours of Hercules—in which their best warrior must complete a set of twelve new tasks that only gods could succeed in. Caesar states that if all the tasks are completed, he will hand over the Roman Empire to them; if they fail even just one task, the Gauls must surrender to Rome. Agreeing to the terms, the village assigns Asterix and Obelix to perform the tasks, with Caesar assigning Caius Tiddlus, a Roman man renowned for his honesty, to act as both their guide to the tasks and the challenges' referee.

In their first set of challenges, Asterix defeats Asbestos the Greek, champion of the ancient Olympic Games, in a race, and Cilindric the German in a judo match, by outsmarting his opponent, while Obelix defeats Verses the Persian, by managing to throw a javelin further than him. In their next challenge, the pair find themselves crossing a lake to an island known as the "Isle of Pleasure", home to beautiful Sirens, who they must resist. Although the Gauls nearly succumb to the women, Obelix comes to his senses when he learns that there are no wild boars for him to hunt and eat, allowing the pair to accomplish the challenge. The pair continue to have further success, with Asterix defeating Iris the Egyptian, by surviving turning his powerful hypnotic power against him, while Obelix defeats Belgian cook Mannekenpix by consuming all of the meals he prepares—under the assumption they were hors d'oeuvres.

Following their success in enduring the "Cave of the Beast" in the next challenge, the pair find themselves told by Caius to acquire a permit document from "The Place that Sends you Mad", a multi-storey bureaucratic building. After finding it impossible because of the clinically unhelpful people who direct them elsewhere, Asterix beats them at their own game by requesting an imaginary permit and turning their behaviour against them, resulting in the building's Prefect to unwittingly hand over what the Gauls came for. The pair continue to complete further challenges: crossing a ravine filled with crocodiles by beating them up rather than using an invisible tightrope; answering a riddle by the Old Man of the Mountain, conducted in the form of a washing detergent advertisement; and enduring a night on a plain haunted by ghostly legionnaires, who Asterix scares away through furious complaints.

Asterix and Obelix eventually find themselves in Rome, alongside their fellow villagers, for their final task. Brought to the Circus Maximus, the Gauls fight against gladiators, whom they beat, and defeat various animals sent against them by turning the arena into a modern-day circus. Having succeeded in every task, Caesar agrees that they are gods, giving the Gauls control of the Roman Empire. Caesar retires to live a quiet and peaceful life with Cleopatra, while Caius is rewarded for his service and retires to the Isle of Pleasure. As the village celebrates their success, Asterix answers Obelix's question of them really conquering Rome by pointing out that everything that happened to them was a mere cartoon, in which anything is possible. Obelix takes advantage of this and teleports himself and his wild boar meat to the Isle of Pleasure by the Siren High Priestress to enjoy himself.

== Cast ==
Character	Original	English Dub
Asterix	Roger Carel	Sean Barrett (uncredited)
Cacofonix	Bernard Lavalette	Geoffrey Russell (uncredited)
Cacofonix	Pierre Trabaud (uncredited)	Geoffrey Russell (uncredited)
Dogmatix	Roger Carel (uncredited)	Roger Carel (uncredited)
Caius Tiddlius	Roger Carel	Sean Barrett (uncredited)
Roman Senators	Pascal Mazzotti	Paul Bacon (uncredited)
Roman Senators	Roger Carel	Geoffrey Russell (uncredited)
Roman Senators	Lawrence Riesner	John Ringham (uncredited)
Roman Senators	Claude Bertrand	Unknown
Obelix	Jacques Morel	Michael Kilgarriff (uncredited)
Chief Priestess of the Isle of Pleasure	Micheline Dax	Christina Greatrex (uncredited)
Cleopatra	Micheline Dax	Gennie Nevinson (uncredited)
Mrs. Geriatrix	Nicole Jonesco	Christina Greatrex (uncredited)
Old Man of the Mountains	Gérard Hernandez	Paul Bacon (uncredited)
Julius Caesar	Jean Martinelli	Alexander John (uncredited)
Zeus	Jean Martinelli	Alexander John (uncredited)
Vitalstatistix	Pierre Tornade	Paul Bacon (uncredited)
Getafix	Henri Virlojeux	Geoffrey Russell (uncredited)
Iris the Hypnotizer	Henri Virlojeux	Paul Bacon (uncredited)
Fulliautomatix	Georges Atlas	Sean Barrett (uncredited)
Hermes	Bernard Lavalette	George Baker (uncredited)
Roman Ghost	Georges Atlas	Sean Barrett (uncredited)
Bureaucrats	Henri Labussière	Alexander John (uncredited)
Bureaucrats	Claude Dasset	George Baker (uncredited)
Bureaucrats	Nicole Jonesco	Gennie Nevinson (uncredited)
Bureaucrats	Odette Laure	Paddy Turner (uncredited)
Bureaucrats	Caroline Cler	Ysanne Churchman (uncredited)
Bureaucrats	Gisèle Grimm	Christina Greatrex (uncredited)
Bureaucrats	Georges Atlas	John Ringham (uncredited)
Bureaucrats	Alice Sapritch (uncredited)	Gennie Nevinson (uncredited)
Bureaucrats	Lawrence Riesner	Paul Bacon (uncredited)
The Prefect	Bernard Lavalette	George Baker (uncredited)
Cylindric	Roger Lumont	Sean Barrett (uncredited)
The Centurion	Henri Poirier	Paul Bacon (uncredited)
Mannikinpix	Stéphane Steeman	Sean Barrett (uncredited)
Aphrodite	Monique Thubert	Paddy Turner (uncredited)
Impedimenta	Nicole Vervil	Ysanne Churchman (uncredited)
Narrator	Pierre Tchernia (uncredited)	John Ringham (uncredited)
Indian Chief	Georges Atlas	Paul Bacon (uncredited)
Priestesses	Mary Mongourdin	Paddy Turner (uncredited)
Priestesses	Mary Mongourdin	Barbara Mitchell (uncredited)
Hera	Nicole Jonesco	Christina Greatrex (uncredited)
Ares	Georges Atlas	Paul Bacon (uncredited)
Gladiator Trainer	Claude Dasset	Sean Barrett (uncredited)
Jailer	Lawrence Riesner	Sean Barrett (uncredited)
Soldier	Jacques Hilling	John Ringham (uncredited)
Roman Soldier	Jacques Hilling	George Baker (uncredited)
Unhygienix	Henri Poirier	George Baker (uncredited)
Verses	Roger Lumont	Sean Barrett (uncredited)
Singing Parrot "Samba!"	Jean Stout	Jean Stout

== Home media ==
In the United Kingdom, it was watched by 400,000 viewers on television during the first half of 2005, making it the fifth most-watched foreign-language film on UK television during that period.

== Comic book and story book adaptations ==
- In 1976, Uderzo's brother Marcel created a comic book adaptation of the film. This rare album has been translated in various languages, but is unavailable in the regular series. The English translation, only published as part of the once off comic book annual Asterix Annual 1980, was based on the dialogue of the English version of the film and was titled Asterix Conquers Rome.
- There is also an illustrated book of the film (of the same name) containing the story in text. The story book is more regularly published and more widely translated than the very rare comic book.

== Legacy ==
Especially in France, Italy and Germany, "The Place that sends you mad" sequence has reached a strong cult status as a satire of absurd modern-day bureaucracy. In Germany, "Passierschein A38" ("Curfew pass A38"), the name of the fictional document Asterix has to get, has become a popular slang term to ironically describe absurd bureaucracy and saw a rise in popularity when it was used to describe difficult bureaucracy during the COVID-19 pandemic. It was also referenced in the second expansion of The Witcher 3: Wild Hunt, Blood and Wine; there, Geralt has to retrieve Permit A38 from a Touissant office, and face unhelpful clerks and confusing architecture. In the German city of Mönchengladbach, Passierschein A38 is the name of a digital pass to access the city's online services.

== Future ==
=== Live-action version ===
It is announced in 2025 that this adventure will be the subject of a live-action adaptation, directed by Jonathan Cohen and produced by StudioCanal.

== See also ==
- List of Asterix films
