= La Ballade des Dalton =

1978 film

The Ballad of the Daltons
- Directed by: René Goscinny; Henri Gruel; Morris; Pierre Watrin
- Screenplay by: Pierre Tchernia
- Based on: Lucky Luke by Morris and René Goscinny
- Produced by: Georges Dargaud
- Edited by: Pierre Chabal; René Chaussy; Henri Gruel; Francis Nielsen
- Music by: Claude Bolling
- Production company: Les Studios Idéfix
- Distributed by: United Artists
- Release date: 24 October 1978 (France)
- Running time: 82 min
- Country: France
- Languages: French; English

The Ballad of the Daltons (known as Les Ballade Des Dalton in French) is a 1978 French animated film written and directed by René Goscinny, Morris, Henri Gruel and Pierre Watrin starring the comic book character Lucky Luke. Two different adaptations of the film in book form were both published in French in 1978. The first, adapted by Guy Vidal, was in text form rather than comic strip, and was accompanied by images from the film. The second was a comic strip adaptation by an uncredited Pascal Dabère and formed part of the book, La Ballade des Dalton et autres histoires (The Ballad of the Daltons and Other Stories).

== Plot ==
The story is narrated by a musician in a Western saloon, who sings a tale of Lucky Luke and his sworn enemies, the Dalton brothers: Joe, William, Jack, and Averell.

Luke has once again thrown the four outlaws into jail. There, the Daltons are met by a lawyer named Augustus Betting. Betting informs them that their uncle Henry Dalton has died by hanging and has willed his considerable inheritance to them, on the condition that they kill the judge and jury who sentenced him. To verify that the task has been completed, they must be accompanied by a witness: Lucky Luke, the only honest man Henry had ever known. Should they fail, Henry's fortune will instead be given to charity.

The Daltons escape from jail and offer a deal to Lucky Luke: cooperate and (ostensibly) get a share of the inheritance, or refuse and be killed. Luke seemingly agrees to supervise the killings and even offers to help commit them. However, every time they find one of their intended victims, Luke manages to play some trick on the Daltons so that they believe their target is dead.

Once they think their task is done, the Daltons head off to meet A. Betting, only to find the judge and jury waiting for them. With Luke as a witness, they Daltons are promptly found guilty of the nine attempted murders. An enraged Joe attempts to escape, but is caught by Luke's horse Jolly Jumper. The Daltons are returned to jail and Henry Dalton's fortune is used to open an orphanage.

== Cast ==
Character	Original	English
An unhappy cowboy	G. Atlas	Unknown
A prison guard	G. Atlas	Unknown
William Dalton	J. Balutin	Dick Vosburgh
Min Li Foo	R. Carel	John Graham
Mathias Bones	R. Carel	Unknown
Lucky Luke	D. Ceccaldi	Douglas Lambert
Bud Bugman	J. Deschamps	Unknown
Snake Feather	M. Elias	Unknown
Thadeus Collins	J.Fabbri	Unknown
Rin Tin Can	B. Haller	Tony Sibbald
Jack Dalton	G. Hernandez	Blain Fairman
The printer	H. Labussière	Unknown
Augustus Betting	J. Legras	Unknown
Carmen	A. Lonati	Unknown
Pancho	R. Lumont	Unknown
Sam Game	J. Morel	Unknown
Judge Gruby	H. Poirier	Unknown
Averell Dalton	P. Tornade	Thick Wilson
Bill	E. Kristy	Thick Wilson
Dr. Aldous Smith, the charlatan	J.M. Thibault	Unknown
Joe Dalton	P. Trabaud	David Healy
Miss Worthlesspenny	R. Varte	Beth Porter
Tom O'Connor	H. Virlojeux	Unknown
Jolly Jumper	René Goscinny (uncredited)	Unknown

=== Additional Voices ===
- R. Carel (The Newspaper Crier, Juan the Mexican)
- X. Depraz (The cowboy who avoids the train)
- J. Deschamps (A gold digger, The Sheriff of Tumbleweed Springs)
- G. Grimm
- B. Haller (Tobias Wills)
- G. Hernandez (Pepe the Mexican)
- H. Labussière (The first bartender)
- R. Lumont (Walt)
- H. Poirier (The Warden of the Dalton Prison)
- L. Riesner (The apprentice farrier, The Doctor of Tumbleweed Springs, The second bartender, A rodeo cowboy)
- P. Tchernia (The cowboy who was killed off-screen)

== Characters ==
Lucky Luke – A cowboy who can shoot faster than his own shadow. One of the most respected cowboys on the plains.

The Dalton Brothers – A notorious outlaw gang composed of Joe, William, Jack and Averell Dalton.

Jolly Jumper – Luke's loyal and intelligent horse.

Rin Tin Can – A dimwitted prison guard dog who follows Luke and the Daltons around.

Henry Dalton – Deceased uncle to The Dalton Brothers. Amassed a fortune from his life of crime. Was found guilty and hanged for his crimes.

Augustus Betting – The notary who tasks the Daltons with fulfilling Henry's will. His name is a pun on abetting.

=== The court and the jury ===
Ming Li Foo – The first juror. A Chinese laundryman who lives in Grass City. After he takes the Daltons' clothes to wash, Luke finds him on the street and, following a brief misunderstanding, helps him fake his death at Luke's hands.

Thadeus Collins – The second juror. A jail warden whose compassionate attitude towards his prisoners led to all of them escaping. Luke helps him leave through one of the jail's many escape tunnels, then tricks the Daltons into "killing" him by blowing the jail up.

Snake Feather – The third juror. A Native American witch doctor living in the Desert of Thirst. He offers the dehydrated Daltons water laced with hallucinogenic mushrooms. When they come to, Luke claims they killed him.

Dr. Aldous Smith – The fourth juror. A traveling quack doctor who claims to have a miraculous elixir that can cure every disease. Luke convinces Joe that Smith's drink is a deadly poison and Joe forces him to take it, which simply makes him pass out from intoxication. The character's appearance is modeled after American actor W.C. Fields.

Tom O'Connor – The fifth juror. An old miner who hasn't been seen out of his gold mine in years. He shoots at the approaching Daltons, but Luke manages to disarm him and explain the situation. Luke leads the Daltons on a high speed mine track ride at the end of which O'Connor awaits, disguised as a ghost. The terrified Daltons flee the mine, believing O'Connor to be already dead.

Sam Game – The sixth juror. A former notorious card sharp who has become a clergyman incorporating gambling terms in his sermons. He persuades the Daltons to let him kill himself by playing Russian roulette, only to then privately reveal to Luke that his gun "miraculously" shot blanks.

Steve Bugman – The seventh juror. A train driver. The Daltons derail his train, but Luke manages to reach him before they do. By the time the Daltons catch up, Bugman's assistant claims that he and Luke quarreled and Luke threw him off the train.

Mathias Bones – The eighth juror. A morbid undertaker who is constantly looking out for his next customer. Luke helps him fake his departure from town, and the Daltons shoot a dummy on his hearse. This character's appearance is modeled after actor Boris Karloff.

Judge Groovy – The judge who sentenced Henry Dalton to death, currently officiating at a rodeo. Luke manipulates the Daltons into nominating Averell to participate in the rodeo so as to get close to the judge. After the rodeo leaves the already dimwitted Averell in a daze, Luke leads the Daltons to believe that he successfully killed the judge.

== Published versions ==
There have been several books based on the film.

In 1978, a 60-page large-format book was published with the history of the film in the form of a text written by Guy Vidal and illustrated with images from the film. This book was reissued in 1981 in album format as part of the standard series (T17 La Ballade des Dalton).

Also in that year, La Ballade des Dalton was adapted as a comic strip in the 16/22 collection by Dargaud. The artwork is by Pascal Dabère (uncredited). The comic book was reissued in album format in 1986 and became part of the standard series (T25 La Ballade des Dalton et autres histoires).

It is the last album of the series written by Goscinny.

== Album references ==
Jury member #1: The character Ming Li Foo first appeared in Le Vingtième de cavalerie. A character with the same name but a slightly different appearance played a minor part in the previous film Daisy Town from 1971.

Jury member #2: The jail warden thinks and behaves similarly to the jail warden in La Guérison des Dalton.

Jury member #3: Similar psychedelics to those encountered with meeting Snake Feather can be seen in L'Héritage de Rantanplan.

Jury member #4: The quack doctor who looks like W.C. Fields appeared as a circus manager in Western Circus.

Jury member #5: The old miner looks and behaves like the old miner in La Ville fantôme.

Jury member #6: A friend of the gambler in La Diligence, called Sam Spade, looks exactly like Sam Game.

Jury member #7: The scene where the Daltons derail a train, which consequently runs through the scenery and ends up in a town, is taken from Jesse James.

Jury member #8: The undertaker Mathias Bones was a central character in the 1971 film but made his first appearance in the Lucky Luke album Les Rivaux de Painful Gulch.

Judge: The visual jokes from the rodeo sequences are based on jokes from the album Rodéo. The judge, who also appeared in the 1971 film, looks like the judge in Billy the Kid.

== Movie references ==
The scenes in the Dalton musical comedy dream pays homage to the golden age of musical films and included references (i.e. Singin' in the Rain, White Christmas, Bathing Beauty, Ziegfeld Follies and performer Busby Berkley). Frank Sinatra's 1966 song Strangers in the Night was referenced in the dream.

A caricature of Serge Gainsbourg is the pianist accompanying Bill in the opening sequence. One of the portraits in Collins' office is a caricature of Pierre Tchernia as a prisoner being led away by police guards.

== Trivia ==
- This is the first movie where Lucky Luke's horse Jolly Jumper is seen talking, much like in the original comic books and in fact is voiced by the series' writer René Goscinny in the French version. Rin Tin Can made its appearance in the film for the first time.
- In November 1977, René Goscinny died when the film was almost finished. All that was missing was the scene where the Daltons dance and sing to Singin' in the Rain. On November 4, 1977, the day before his death, Goscinny attended a work session at the Studios Idéfix on the film project. While examining a series of proofs and drawings, he gave his opinion on this or that point to be revised, for example, Averell Dalton's chin and Jolly Jumper's saddle. The last session, which was audio recorded for the purposes of the planned retouching, is the last recorded testimony of Goscinny's life. For the first time, the public was able to listen to the complete recording during the Goscinny and the Cinema exhibition at the Cinémathèque française in 2017-2018.
- This is the last animated feature film produced and developed by Studios Idéfix before their closure.
- It was the last Lucky Luke animated film released until Go West! A Lucky Luke Adventure in 2007
