= Daisy Town (film) =

1971 film

- French theatrical release poster
- Directed by: René Goscinny; Morris
- Written by: René Goscinny; Morris; Pierre Tchernia
- Produced by: René Goscinny; Raymond LeBlanc; Gerard Dargaud; Leon Zuratas
- Starring: Marcel Bozzuffi; Pierre Trabaud; Jacques Balutin; Jacques Jouanneau; Pierre Tornade; Jean Berger; Jacques Fabbri; Roger Carel; Claude Dasset
- Cinematography: François Léonard
- Edited by: Roger Cacheux; Jean-Pierre Cereghetti
- Music by: Claude Bolling
- Production companies: Belvision Studios; Dargaud Films
- Distributed by: Les Artistes Associés
- Release date: 20 December 1971 (France)
- Running time: 71 minutes
- Countries: France; Belgium
- Language: French
- Budget: 4.5 million francs

Lucky Luke (also known as Daisy Town in many of the re-releases) is a 1971 Franco-Belgian film based upon the comic book character Lucky Luke and making it his first animated appearance. The film was directed by the original creators of the comics (René Goscinny and Morris) and was co-produced between Belvision Studios (Brussels) and Dargaud Films (Paris). A Lucky Luke comic based on the film, with the title Daisy Town was released in 1982, drawn by Pascal Dabère.

== Plot ==
Crossing the plains, a wagon train comes across a solitary daisy growing out of the vast wasteland. The leader of the expedition decides that the rest of their party will set up their new town on the site. In honor of the flower, the citizens name the new homestead, 'Daisy Town'. However, no sooner is the town finished, then it begins to attract all manner of trouble-makers and desperadoes.

One day, Lucky Luke comes riding into town astride his horse, Jolly Jumper. After taking care of most of the trouble in the saloon, Luke is assailed on his way to find quarters for the night. However, every single outlaw is taken care of by Luke. These actions don't go unnoticed by the townsfolk. The next morning, The mayor and several more townsfolk go to meet with Luke, asking him if he would accept the position of Sheriff of Daisy Town. Luke replies with one word: "Yep".

It looks like peace has returned until word comes that the Dalton Brothers are in the vicinity. The Daltons begin robbing stores and even blow up the local hotel. Luke tries to incite the townsfolk to stop them, but most are apt to just let the Daltons have their way. This causes Luke to renounce being the town's sheriff.

The Daltons decide to run for major positions in the town. Joe Dalton decides to run for mayor, William Dalton for judge, and Jack Dalton for sheriff. When Averell Dalton asks what position he can run for, the others decide to simply make him their campaign manager. Luke uses this to his advantage and turns Averell against his brothers. The four brothers begin fighting each other and voting is called off.

The Daltons are tarred and feathered, and run out of town. Some distance off, they are accosted by some Indians, and taken captive. In a scheme to get free, Joe Dalton tells the chief of the tribe that the settlers coming across the land will mean the end of the prairie. His words end up inciting the chief to declare war on Daisy Town. However, the tribe quickly betrays the Daltons by taking them to prison after the chief sees a wanted poster of them, causing Joe to get blamed by his brothers for it.

Lucky Luke manages to view the tribe's preparations for war and alerts the townsfolk. Luke works out a plan to make the Indians believe the settlers are abandoning the town but will load the conestoga wagons with armed men. The plan works, and the Indians try to attack. Luke calls for the wagons to circle, and then orders them to all turnaround. This strange spectacle happens several more times. The chief becomes dizzy from the constant turning around and calls for a pow-wow.

A peace treaty is instituted and everyone celebrates. The Mayor toasts Luke's work, proclaiming Daisy Town's bright future. However, no sooner has this toast been made, than a man runs into town shouting that gold has been found in the hills. With that news, all the inhabitants abandon Daisy Town, which quickly takes on the look of a ghost town. Before he leaves, Lucky Luke plucks the daisy at the base of the town's sign, putting it into Jolly Jumper's mane. The town's sign falls over into the dust, as Luke rides off into the sunset.

== Cast ==
Character	Original	English
Lucky Luke	Marcel Bozzuffi	Rich Little
Joe Dalton	Pierre Trabaud	Rich Little
William Dalton	Jacques Balutin	Rich Little
Jack Dalton	Jacques Jouanneau	Rich Little
Averell Dalton	Pierre Tornade	Rich Little
Jolly Jumper	Jean Berger	Rich Little
Narrator	Jean Berger	Rich Little
Cavalry Officer	Roger Carel	Rich Little
Mathias Bones	Roger Carel	Rich Little
Old Man in Wheelchair	Roger Carel	Rich Little
Vulture	Roger Carel	Rich Little
Mayor	Jacques Fabbri	Rich Little
Banker	Jacques Legras	Rich Little
Indian Chief	Claude Dasset	Rich Little
Bartender	Georges Atlas	Rich Little
Square Dance Caller	Gérald Rinaldi	Rich Little
Lulu Carabine	Rosy Varte (dialogue)	Rich Little
Lulu Carabine	Nicole Croisille (singing)	Nicole Croisille (singing)
Singer	Pat Woods	Pat Woods

=== Additional Voices ===
- Pierre Tchernia
- Jacques Bodoin
- André Legal
- Jacques Hilling
- Denise Bosc

== Production ==
The film is based on the series of comic books by Morris which was first published in 1946, this 1971 animated feature follows an original plot, but incorporates many characters and elements from previously published books. An adaptation of the film itself was finally published as a Lucky Luke album in 1983. Furthermore, a live-action version directed by and starring Terence Hill was released theatrically in some European countries in 1991. This served as the pilot to a short-lived live-action TV series, which used Daisy Town as the backdrop for most of its action.

In the Spanish language version, the story is not narrated by the horse unlike the original French.

For the English version, Canadian actor Rich Little voiced all the characters, using celebrity impersonations (Gary Cooper for Lucky Luke, James Stewart for the narrator, Boris Karloff for the undertaker Mathias Bones, etc.)

== Published versions ==
There are several books based on this film.

In 1971, with the release of the film, a large-format book was published by Dargaud Éditeur, entitled Histoire d'un dessin animé - Lucky Luke. The book is made up of the story of the film illustrated by photos of the film. This story is followed in the same publication by a succession of all the stages in the construction of the cartoon in the cinema.

In 1972, Éditions PEG, offered by the TOTAL network, published the illustrated story of the film (not the same as in the previous book) entitled Lucky Luke - Daisy town.

In 1983, Daisy Town, a comic book retranscribed from the film, drawn by Pascal Dabère (from the Studio Dargaud), was released. This book has the usual album format and is part of the standard collection (T20 at Dargaud).

== Album references ==
Although the plot was not based on any of the previously released Lucky Luke albums, almost every character and every incident in the film is a reference to the albums. For example, the idea of the Dalton Brothers trying to take over the town by becoming sheriff, judge, etc., is based on Lucky Luke contre Joss Jamon. The burgomeister is based on Herbert Hoofer from Le Pied-tendre and the barman is based on George le Barman from the same album.
