= Gérard Hernandez =

French actor (born 1933)

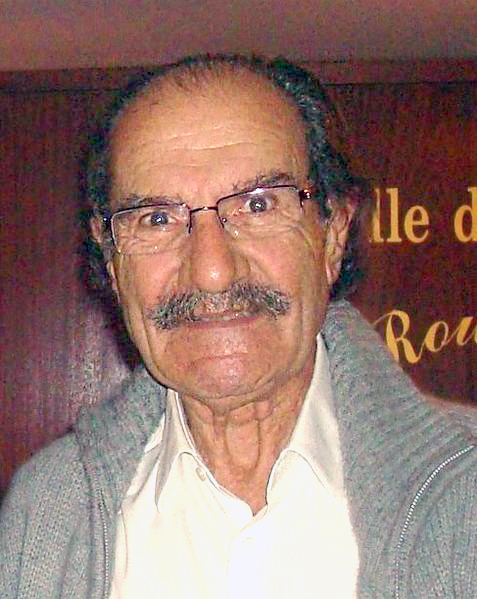
- Hernandez in 2008
- Born: Julio Gerardo Hernandez; 20 January 1933 (age 93); Valladolid, Second Spanish Republic
- Occupation: Actor
- Years active: 1955–present
- Television: Père et Maire; Scènes de Ménages

Julio Gerardo "Gérard" Hernandez (born 20 January 1933) is a Spanish-born French actor.

== Biography ==
Hernandez was born in Valladolid, Spain and was naturalized French only in 1975. He is mostly famous for his mustache and for having voiced several live-action/cartoon characters, including Gonzo in the French dubbed version of The Muppet Show, Professor Moriarty in the French dubbed version of Sherlock Hound, Papa Smurf and Grouchy Smurf in the French dubbed version of The Smurfs (1981) and the film of the same name.

In films, he only had supporting roles. He is famous for his collaboration with Jean-Pierre Marielle and Philippe Noiret in the French film Coup de Torchon (1981) directed by Bertrand Tavernier.

He was famous on television in the 1970s and 1980s, where he was a regular guest in game shows like Les Jeux de 20 heures on FR3 and L'Académie des neuf on Antenne 2. He also hosted the game show Les Affaires sont les Affaires on Canal+ in the mid-1980s.

He has also voiced Franz Sanchez (Robert Davi) in the French dubbed version of James Bond film Licence to Kill (1989).

He portrays the regular role of Commissaire Perret in the French TV series Père et Maire from 2002 to 2009. He plays Raymond in the sitcom Scènes de Ménages since 2009 on M6.

== Filmography ==
=== Films ===
- La Meilleure Part (1955) ... Gonzalez
- Méfiez-vous fillettes (1957) ... hotel customer
- The Lovers of Montparnasse (1957)
- The Hole (1960) ... a prisoner
- La Belle Américaine (1961) ... Gruau, a policeman
- Le Crime ne paie pas (1961) ... witness of accident
- Les Combinards (1966) ... abbot
- Le Cerveau (1968) ... an agent
- Les Gaspards (1974) ... Hervé Balzac, police inspector
- Attention les yeux! (1976) ... restaurant owner
- D'amour et d'eau fraîche (1976) ... Ben
- Cours après moi que je t'attrape (1976) ... Grandpré
- The Porter from Maxim's (1976) ... Hernandez
- Bobby Deerfield (1977) ... Carlos Del Montanara
- La Nuit, tous les chats sont gris (1977) ... bistrot owner
- Les Ringards (1978) ... prison governor
- Coup de tête (1979) ... inspector
- C'est pas moi, c'est lui (1979) ... pottery seller
- Rodriguez au pays des merguez (1980) ... Gongormatz
- Signé Furax (1980) ... Asti Spumante
- Coup de Torchon (1981) ... Leonelli
- Sanguine (1988) ... Alvaro
- L'Invité surprise (1988) ... casino owner
- La Femme du cosmonaute (1998) ... Professor Klavel
- La Dilettante (1999) ... police inspector
- A Crime in Paradise (2000) ... Jacky

=== Television ===
- Les Cinq Dernières Minutes (1960) ... building painter (1 episode)
- Les Évasions célèbres (1972) ... Mazarin (1 episode)
- Le Temps des as (mini-series) (1978) ... Bachereau
- Le Roi qui vient du Sud (1979) ... Concini
- Toutes griffes dehors (1982) ... Simonès
- Commissaire Moulin (1989) ... José Ribeira (1 episode)
- C'est quoi ce petit boulot? (1991) ... Ben
- Bonnes Vacances (1998) ... Legendre
- La Surprise (2000) ... Philippe Charbier
- Père et Maire (2002–09) ... Commissaire Perret
- Mer belle à agitée (TV film) (2004) ... Albert
- Scènes de Ménages (2009–present) ... Raymond

== Voice actor ==
=== Film dubbings ===
- Tom Jones (1963) ... Black George (Wilfrid Lawson)
- Reflections in a Golden Eye (1967) ... Anacleto
- Shalako (1968) ... Rojas (Julián Mateos)
- The Wild Bunch (1969) ... Angel (Jaime Sánchez)
- Guns of the Magnificent Seven (1969) ... Keno (Monte Markham)
- The Love Bug (1969) ... hippie (Robert Foulk)
- Mackenna's Gold (1969) ... Colorado (Omar Sharif)
- Little Big Man (1970) ... historian (William Hickey)
- Chisum (1970) ... Neemo
- Cannon for Cordoba (1970) ... Andy Rice (Pete Duel
- Wild Rovers (1971) ... Sheriff Bill Jackson (Victor French)
- Delusions of Grandeur (1971) ... Giuseppe (Leopoldo Trieste)
- Deliverance (1972) ... mountain man (Bill McKinney)
- The New Centurions (1972) ... Sergio (Erik Estrada)
- My Name is Nobody (1973) ... corral owner
- The Stone Killer (1973) ... garagist
- The Taking of Pelham One Two Three (1974) ... a thug
- Thunderbolt and Lightfoot (1974) ... Goody (Geoffrey Lewis)
- Rosebud (1975) ... Hamlekh (Cliff Gorman)
- The Man Who Would Be King (1975) ... Billy Fish (Saeed Jaffrey)
- Brannigan (1975) ... Angell (Arthur Batanides)
- Supervixens (1975) ... Cal MacKinney (John LaZar)
- Taxi Driver (1976) ... grocer (Victor Argo)
- Annie Hall (1977) ... Alvy's uncle
- Cross of Iron (1977) ... Caporal Schnurrbart
- The Lord of the Rings (1978) ... Gollum (Peter Woodthorpe), Wormtongue (Michael Deacon)
- Odds and Evens (1978) ... Nynfus (Sal Borgese)
- Up in Smoke (1978) ... Pedro de Pacas (Cheech Marin)
- Apocalypse Now (1979) ... photographer (Dennis Hopper)
- Manhattan (1979) ... pizzeria waiter (Raymond Serra)
- Stir Crazy (1980) ... Skip Donahue (Gene Wilder)
- Heavy Metal (1981) ... robot (John Candy)
- The Bunker (1981) ... Joseph Goebbels (Cliff Gorman)
- Romancing the Stone (1984) ... Juan (Alfonso Arau)
- Firewalker (1986) ... cantina owner
- Tin Men (1987) ... Ernest Tilley (Danny DeVito)
- Harry and the Hendersons (1987) ... Jacques LaFleur (David Suchet)
- Licence to Kill (1989) ... Franz Sanchez (Robert Davi)
- The Karate Kid Part III (1989) ... Mr Miyagi (Pat Morita)
- Do the Right Thing (1989) ... Pino (John Turturro)

=== TV series ===
- I Dream of Jeannie (1965) ... Major Anthony Nelson (Larry Hagman)
- Kojak (1973–78) ... Inspector Gomez
- Starsky and Hutch (1975) ... Mickey
- The Love Boat (1977) ... Doctor Adam Bricker (Bernie Kopell)
- Man from Atlantis (1978) ... Moby
- Message from Space: Galactic Wars (1979) ... Sidero
- Miami Vice (1984–89) ... Lieutenant Rodriguez
- ALF (1986–90) ... Willie Tanner (Max Wright)

=== Animated series ===
- The Flintstones (1960–66) ... Barney
- The Muppet Show (1977) ... Gonzo, Waldorf, Rowlf
- The Secret Lives of Waldo Kitty (1979) ... Waldo
- Around the World with Willy Fog (1981) ... Bully and Tico
- The Smurfs (1981) ... Papa Smurf, Grouchy Smurf
- Dogtanian and the Three Muskehounds (1981) ... Dogtanian
- ThunderCats (1985) ... Mongor, Claudus
- Seabert (1985) ... Sulfuric
- Maeterlinck's Blue Bird: Tyltyl and Mytyl's Adventurous Journey (1986) ... Tylo, narrator
- Fireman Sam (1987) ... Commandant Steele
- Babar (1989) ... Cornelius
- Chip 'n Dale Rescue Rangers (1989–90) ... additional voices
- Darkwing Duck (1991) ... Darkwing Duck
- Albert the Fifth Musketeer (1993) ... D'Artagnan
- Iznogoud (1995) ... Iznogoud
- 101 Dalmatians: The Series (1997) ... Jasper, Mayor Edmond, Sydney, Sergeant Tibs

=== Animated films ===
- Tintin and the Temple of the Sun (1969) ... chief of train station
- The Twelve Tasks of Asterix (1976) ... Le Vénérable du sommet
- La Ballade des Dalton (1977) ... Jack Dalton
- The Rescuers (1977) ... the muskrat
- The Castle of Cagliostro (1979) ... Jigen
- The Fox and the Hound (1981) ... Badger
- Les Dalton en cavale (1983) ... Jack Dalton
- Oliver & Company (1988) ... Tito
- The Little Mermaid (1989) ... Eureka
- Porco Rosso (1992) ... Paolo Piccolo
- Bambi (1993) ... Owl
- Lady and the Tramp (1997) ... Joe
- Atlantis: The Lost Empire (2000) ... Jebidiah Allardyce "Cookie" Farnsworth
- Chicken Run (2000) ... Pick
- Shrek (2001) ... the priest
- Atlantis: Milo's Return (2003) ... Cookie
- The Land Before Time (2005) ... narrator
- The Smurfs (2011) ... Papa Smurf
- The Smurfs 2 (2013) ... Papa Smurf

== Theater ==
Comedian

- La Guerre du sucre (1957), Théâtre des Bouffes-Parisiens
- Trencavel (1962), Théâtre Montparnasse
- Les Papas naissent dans les armoires (1978), Théâtre de la Michodière
- Le Système Ribadier (1986), Théâtre La Bruyère
- 3 partout (1981), Théâtre des Variétés
- Sans rancune (1992), Théâtre du Palais-Royal
- Le Dîner de cons (1994), Théâtre des Variétés
- La Surprise (1999), Théâtre Saint-Georges
- Grosse Chaleur (2004), Théâtre de la Renaissance
- Toc-Toc (2012), tour

Stage director

- La Peau du personnage (2005), Le Funambule Montmartre

== Awards and nominations ==
- Molière Award for Best Supporting Actor for Sans rancune, 1992
- Molière Award for Best Supporting Actor for Le Dîner de cons, 1994
- Grand Prix Award for Best Actor of Sitcom for Scènes de Ménages, 2012
