= Billy Kearns =

American actor (1923–1992)

- Born: William Byron Kearns; February 17, 1923; Seattle, Washington, U.S.
- Died: November 27, 1992 (aged 69); Château-d'Œx, Switzerland
- Occupations: Actor; film producer

Billy Kearns (17 February 1923 – 27 November 1992) was an American actor.

== Biography ==
During World War II, Kearns fought in the Army's newly founded 10th Mountain Division, created for fighting in mountainous areas. His acting career took place almost entirely in France. He often played American or British characters in minor roles in TV films or motion pictures.

He is best known for portraying fictional character Bill Ballantine in the French 1965 TV series Bob Morane.

== Partial filmography ==
- The Roots of Heaven (1958) – Sarcastic Man in Bar (uncredited)
- Witness in the City (1959) – Le soldat américain
- Two Men in Manhattan (1959) – L'homme de la sécurité à la Ridgewood Tavern
- Monsieur Robinson Crusoe (1960)
- Purple Noon (1960) – Freddy Miles
- Women Are Like That (1960) – Charlie Ribban
- La Fête espagnole (1961) – Kunk
- Three Faces of Sin (1961) – Un client
- A Touch of Treason (1962) – Mike Slatter
- A Monkey in Winter (1962) – Un automobiliste (uncredited)
- The Elusive Corporal (1962) – Un garde / Guard (uncredited)
- Five Miles to Midnight (1962) – Capt. Wade
- The Trial (1962) – First Assistant Inspector
- The Day and the Hour (1963) – Pat Riley
- Symphonie pour un massacre (1963) – Un client américain
- Le Quatrième Sexe (1963) – (uncredited)
- Blague dans le coin (1963) – Lieutenant Smith
- The Counterfeit Constable (1964) – Le psychiatre
- Bob Morane (1964-1965, TV Series) – Bill Ballantine
- Up from the Beach (1965) – Colonel in bunker
- Pleins feux sur Stanislas (1965) – L'espion américain
- How to Keep the Red Lamp Burning (1965) – James J. Gordon, le client texan (segment "Procès, Le") (uncredited)
- Gendarme in New York (1965) – Le lieutenant de police
- Is Paris Burning? (1966) – Patton Aide (uncredited)
- Atout coeur à Tokyo pour OSS 117 (1966) – M. Smith
- Shock Troops (1967) – Hoffer
- Les grandes vacances (1967) – Le conducteur du car
- Playtime (1967) – Mr. Schultz
- Asterix the Gaul (1967) - Tulius Optupus (English version, voice)
- Patton (1970) – Officer Callagher (uncredited)
- The Time to Die (1970) – Helmut
- Bed and Board (1970) – Mr. Max
- Et qu'ça saute! (1970)
- Trop petit mon ami (1970) – Wanassee
- Atlantic Wall (1970) – Commandant du Camp
- Ils (1970) – Wesley
- The Love Mates (1970) – Barry / l'acheteur américain-the American buyer
- Supergirl (1971, TV Movie) – Himself
- The Married Couple of the Year Two (1971) – Le beau-père
- Qu'est-ce qui fait courir les crocodiles? (1971) – Sitting
- Le mataf (1972)
- Le désir et la volupté (1973) – Le producteur
- Gross Paris (1974)
- The Destructors (1974) – Card Player #1
- Les murs ont des oreilles (1974) – Le producteur américain
- Soldat Duroc, ça va être ta fête! (1975) – L'officier américain (uncredited)
- L'Année sainte (1976) – Le pilote de l'avion
- Marathon Man (1976) – Tourist Couple #1
- Man in a Hurry (1977) – Freeman
- The Fabulous Adventures of Baron Munchausen (1979) – (English version, voice)
- Les Borsalini (1980) – Le boss
- Qu'est-ce qui fait craquer les filles... (1982) – Customer with cigar
- Enigma (1982)
- On l'appelle Catastrophe (1983) – Fredo
- Just the Way You Are (1984) – Earl Cooper
- Asterix Versus Caesar (1985) – Obélix (English version, voice)
- Asterix in Britain (1986) – Obelix (English version, voice)
- À notre regrettable époux (1988)
- Génération oxygène (1991) – M. Newman (final film role)
