= Bernard Lavalette =

French actor (1926–2019)

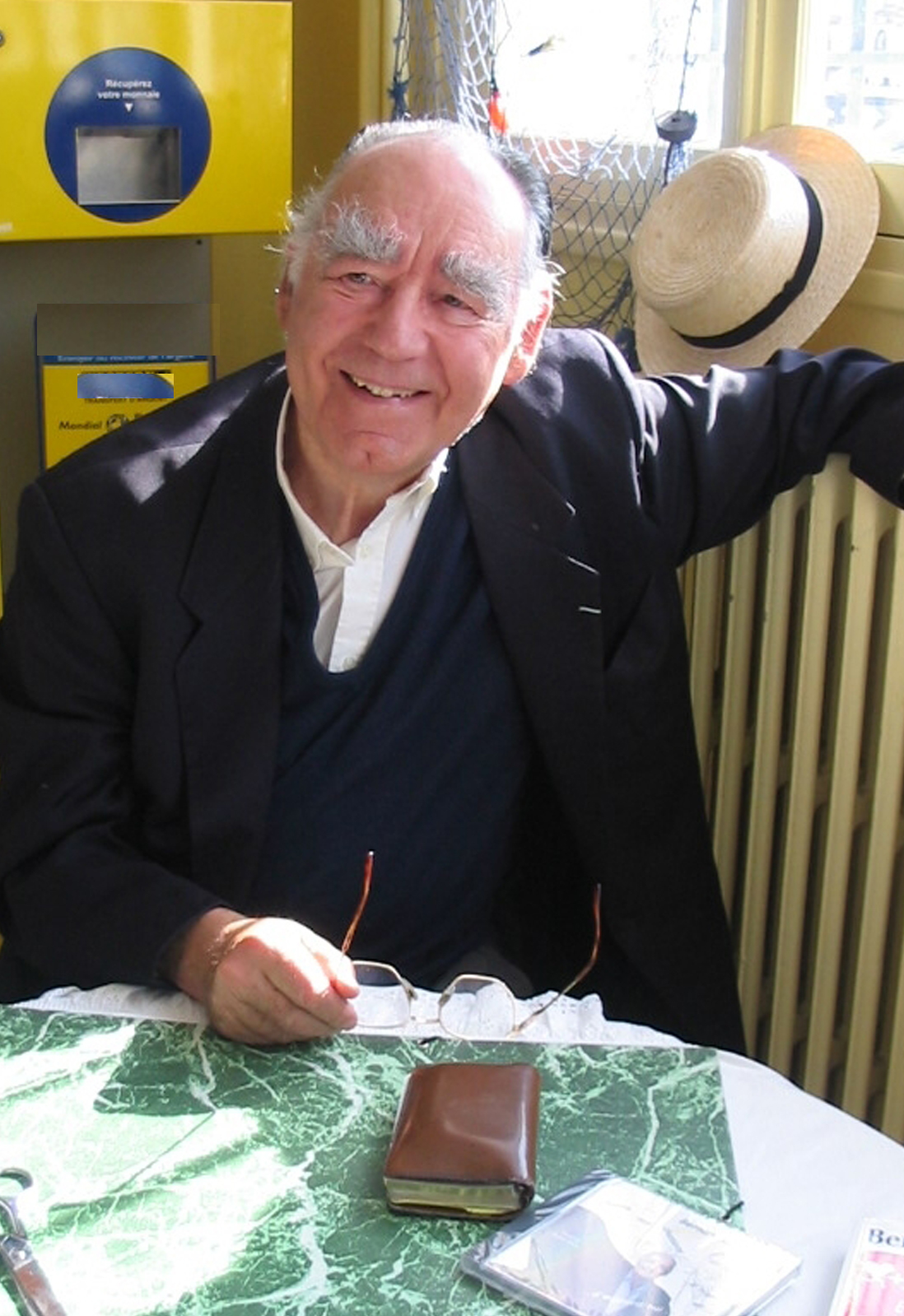
- Lavalette in 2004
- Born: 20 January 1926; Paris, France
- Died: 14 December 2019 (aged 93); Paris, France
- Occupation: Actor
- Years active: 1958–2019

Bernard Lavalette (20 January 1926 – 14 December 2019) was a French film and television actor.

== Partial filmography ==
- Sans famille (1958) - Le brigadier
- The Bureaucrats (1959) - Van Der Hogen
- La Belle Américaine (1961) - Le ministre du commerce
- Tales of Paris (1962) - Richard (segment "Antonia")
- L'assassin est dans l'annuaire (1962) - Martel
- Un clair de lune à Maubeuge (1962) - Le présentateur télé
- Heaven Sent (1963) - Prefect of Police
- Comment épouser un premier ministre (1964) - Le commissaire
- Thomas the Impostor (1965) - Le docteur Gentil
- Les malabars sont au parfum (1966)
- Asterix the Gaul (1967) - (voice)
- Salut Berthe! (1968) - Labarasse
- Le gendarme se marie (1968) - Le professeur de danse
- Asterix and Cleopatra (1968) - Le narrateur / Amonbofis (voice)
- Flash Love (1968) - Le rédacteur en chef
- La grande maffia... (1971) - Le notaire
- Le Viager (1972) - Le député-maire de Saint-Tropez
- Le permis de conduire (1974) - Le P.D.G.
- The Holes (1974)
- Les murs ont des oreilles (1974) - L'éditeur
- Impossible... pas français (1974)
- Maître Pygmalion (1975)
- The Twelve Tasks of Asterix (1976) - Le préfet (voice)
- The Apprentice Heel (1977) - Roger Desmare, l'avocat d'Antoine
- Pourquoi? (1977) - Un spectateur
- La grande frime (1977) - Le professeur
- Dis bonjour à la dame!.. (1977) - Le proviseur
- La ville des silences (1979) - Franger
- La Gueule de l'autre (1979) - Le comte de Chalosse
- Les phallocrates (1980) - Le préfet
- Les surdoués de la première compagnie (1981) - Colonel Varalin
- Cinq jours en juin (1989) - Le patron de l'hôtel

== Bibliography ==
- Ince, Katie. Georges Franju. Manchester University Press, 2005.
