= Georges Dargaud =

French publisher (1911–1990)

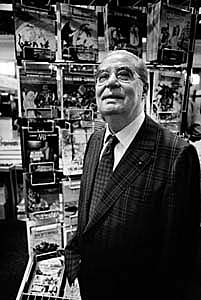
- Dargaud in 1988
- Born: 27 April 1911; Paris, France
- Died: 18 July 1990 (aged 79); Paris, France
- Occupation: Comics publisher
- Known for: Dargaud, publisher of Tintin magazine, Asterix, Lucky Luke comics

Georges Dargaud (French: [daʁɡo]; 27 April 1911 – 18 July 1990) was a French publisher of comics, most famously Tintin magazine, Asterix, and Lucky Luke, through his Dargaud company.

== Biography ==
Dargaud started out working as a broker for an advertising agency. In April 1936, he and his wife, Irène, founded Dargaud S.A. The publishing company focused on corporate communications and family magazines. In 1943, Dargaud began publishing comics, starting with Allo les jeunes. Two years later, he published comic albums of Bob et Bobette by Loys Pétillot (not to be confused with the French version of Willy Vandersteen's Suske en Wiske).

In 1948, Dargaud was approached by Raymond Leblanc, the publisher of Belgian comic magazine Journal de Tintin. Leblanc had previously contacted numerous French publishers, all of whom had refused to publish Tintin on the grounds the eponymous comic's creator, Hergé, had been accused of being a Nazi collaborator for drawing Tintin for a Nazi-controlled newspaper during World War II. Dargaud ignored the anti-Hergé rumors. In October 1948, in partnership with Éditions du Lombard, he became the French publisher of Journal de Tintin, which he continued to print for 27 years.

In December 1960, Dargaud purchased the Pilote weekly comic magazine, which had been established the previous year by the Édifrance/Édipresse syndicate founded by René Goscinny, Albert Uderzo, Jean-Michel Charlier and Jean Hebrad. Although the magazine was successful, its funders had pulled out because of financial difficulties, resulting in Dargaud buying it for what was later described as "pour un franc symbolique" ("for pennies"). The magazine introduced Asterix and later featured Lucky Luke (which transferred from Spirou in 1967). The Asterix comic albums became best-sellers for Dargaud.

Dargaud produced the first Asterix film, Asterix the Gaul, in 1967. In 1976, he produced The 12 Tasks of Asterix. Dargaud's relationship with Goscinny and Uderzo had become strained by the 1970s. When Goscinny died of a heart attack in 1977, the 24th Asterix book, Asterix in Belgium, had been written but not fully illustrated. Uderzo was unwilling to complete the book, so Dargaud took him to court to force him to finish the book. Dargaud won the case; Uderzo appealed and the appeal court eventually ruled for Uderzo, but by that time the book had already been published. Uderzo later said that if he were to caricature Dargaud in an Asterix book, he would depict him as a vampire.

In addition to children’s comics, Dargaud also published adult-oriented comics. Dargaud in 1982 bought publishing firm Les Éditions du Square and its comic Charlie Mensuel, which was merged with Pilote in 1986 under the name Pilote et Charlie. In 1988 the name was changed back to Pilote.

In January 1989, Dargaud sold his publishing house to Média-Participations, a conservative Christian firm. Dargaud died on 18 July 1990 at the age of 79.

In February 2006, his daughter auctioned his collection of comics through auction house Lasseron & Associés.
