= Pierre Trabaud =

French actor (1922–2005)

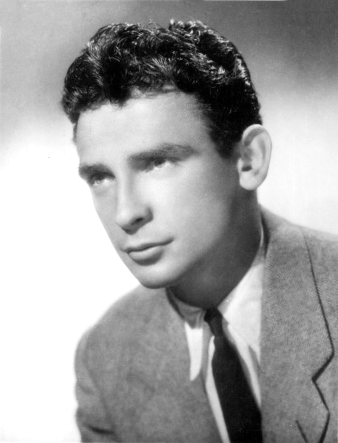
- Harcourt in 1950
- Born: 7 August 1922; Chatou, France
- Died: 26 February 2005 (aged 82); Garches, France
- Occupation: Actor
- Years active: 1926–1982
- Spouse: Capucine (m. 1950; div. 1950)

Pierre Trabaud (7 August 1922 – 26 February 2005) was a French film actor. He appeared in 30 films between 1945 and 1989.

== Personal life ==
Trabaud met French actress Capucine on the set of Rendez-vous (1949). The two married a year later in 1950; however, the marriage ended only eight months later.

== Selected filmography ==
- Le jugement dernier (1945) - Extra (uncredited)
- Ouvert pour cause d'inventaire (1946)
- Antoine and Antoinette (1947) - Riton
- La fleur de l'âge (1947)
- Manon (1949) - Petit rôle (uncredited)
- Rendezvous in July (1949) - Pierrot Rabut
- Lady Paname (1950) - Marcel Bosset - le frère de Caprice, mêlé au milieu (uncredited)
- Without Leaving an Address (1951) - Gaston
- Endless Horizons (1953) - Pierre Castel
- The Unfrocked One (1954) - Gérard Lacassagne
- Le petit nuage/La chasse au nuage/Le nuage atomique (1954) - Journalist (I)
- Les Chiffonniers d'Emmaüs (1955) - Para
- What a Team! (1957) - Hubert Franier
- The Window to Luna Park (1957) - Righetto
- Le Désert de Pigalle (1958) - Janin
- Ce soir on tue (1959) - Larry Laine
- Normandie - Niémen (1960) - Le lieutenant Chardon
- War of the Buttons (1962) - School teacher
- Asterix the Gaul (1967) - Marcus Sacapus (voice)
- Asterix and Cleopatra (1968) - Le capitaine des pirates / Le capitaine égyptien (voice)
- Daisy Town (1971) - Joe Dalton (voice)
- Tarzoon: Shame of the Jungle (1975) - Le premier siamois (French version, voice)
- La Ballade des Dalton (1978) - Joe Dalton, le chef de la bande (voice)
- Lucky Luke (1983) - Joe Dalton (voice)
- Le Voleur de feuilles (1983) - André Marcel
- Round Midnight (1986) - Francis's Father
- Life and Nothing But (1989) - Eugene Dilatoire
