= Index Translationum =

Bibliography of translated published works

The Index Translationum is UNESCO's database of book translations. Books have been translated for thousands of years, with no central record of the fact. The League of Nations established a record of translations in 1932. In 1946, the United Nations superseded the League and UNESCO was assigned the Index. In 1979, the records were computerised.

Since the Index counts translations of individual books, authors with many books with few translations can rank higher than authors with a few books with more translations. So, for example, while the Bible is the single most translated book in the world, it does not rank in the top ten of the index. The Index counts the Walt Disney Company, employing many writers, as a single writer. Authors with similar names are sometimes included as one entry, for example, the ranking for "Hergé" applies not only to the author of The Adventures of Tintin (Hergé), but also to B.R. Hergehahn, Elisabeth Herget, and Douglas Hergert. Hence, the top authors, as the Index presents them, are from a database query whose results require interpretation.

According to the Index, Agatha Christie remains the most-translated individual author.

== Statistics ==
Source: UNESCO

=== Top 10 Author ===
No.	Author	Number of translations
1	Agatha Christie	7,236
2	Jules Verne	4,751
3	William Shakespeare	4,296
4	Enid Blyton	3,924
5	Barbara Cartland	3,652
6	Danielle Steel	3,628
7	Vladimir Lenin	3,593
8	Hans Christian Andersen	3,520
9	Stephen King	3,357
10	Jacob Grimm	2,977

=== Top 10 Country ===
No.	Country	Number of translations
1	Germany	269,724
2	Spain	232,853
3	France	198,574
4	Japan	130,496
5	USSR (to 1991)	92,734
6	Netherlands	90,560
7	Poland	77,716
8	Sweden	73,230
9	Denmark	70,607
10	China	67,304

=== Top 10 Target Language ===
No.	Language	Number of translations
1	German	301,935
2	French	240,045
3	Spanish	228,559
4	English	164,509
5	Japanese	130,649
6	Dutch	111,270
7	Russian	100,806
8	Portuguese	78,904
9	Polish	76,706
10	Swedish	71,209

=== Top 10 Original language ===
No.	Language	Number of translations
1	English	1,266,110
2	French	226,123
3	German	208,240
4	Russian	103,624
5	Italian	69,555
6	Spanish	54,588
7	Swedish	39,984
8	Japanese	29,246
9	Danish	21,252
10	Latin	19,972

== See also ==
- UNESCO Collection of Representative Works, UNESCO's program for funding the translation of works
- List of literary works by number of translations
