= Dargaud =

Publisher of comics

Les Éditions Dargaud
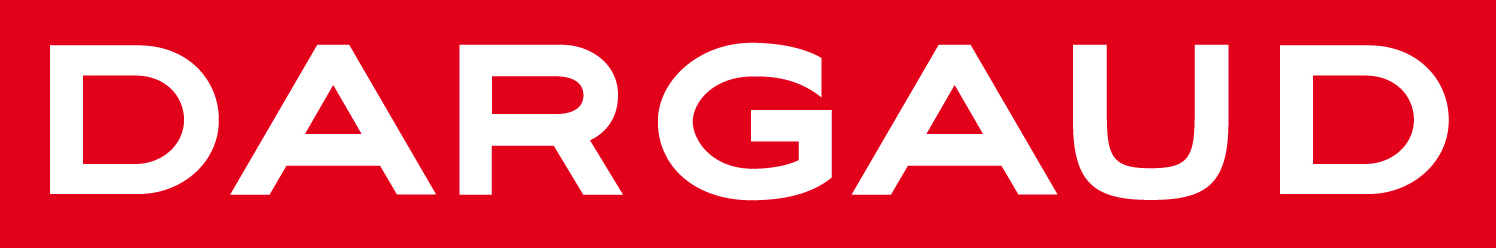
- Parent company: Média-Participations (1988–present)
- Founded: April 1936; 90 years ago in Paris
- Founder: Georges Dargaud
- Country of origin: France
- Headquarters location: Paris
- Publication types: Books
- Fiction genres: Comics
- Imprints: Dargaud-Lombard; Dargaud Suisse; Kana; Lucky Comics; Media-Diffusion; Urban Comics
- Official website: www.dargaud.com

Dargaud head office, 15-27 rue Moussorgski, Paris 18th arr.

Société Dargaud (French pronunciation: [sɔsjete daʁɡo]), doing business as Les Éditions Dargaud, is a publisher of Franco-Belgian comics series, headquartered in the 18th arrondissement of Paris. It was founded in 1936 by Georges Dargaud, publishing its first comics in 1943.

== History ==
Initially, Dargaud published novels for women. In 1948, it started Line, a "magazine for elegant women", as well as a French edition of the Belgian Tintin magazine.

In 1960, Dargaud bought the weekly Pilote magazine from René Goscinny, Albert Uderzo, and Jean-Michel Charlier. Goscinny continued as editor of the magazine, and Charlier was comic album editor for a period. In October 1961, Dargaud published the first Asterix album.

In 1967, Dargaud entered the animation production services by launching a division named Dargaud Films with the movie Asterix the Gaul. Subsequently, the company produced or co-produced several Asterix, Lucky Luke and Tintin feature films. By 1972, Dargaud along with American production and distributor United Artists produced the movie Le Viager which was directed by Pierre Tchernia

In 1974, Dargaud wanted to diversify. Pilote became a monthly magazine and spawned two other monthly magazines. The new magazines were Lucky Luke (a Western themed magazine around the comics series Lucky Luke) and Achille Talon (a humor based magazine around the comics series Achille Talon). However, both magazines could not sustain a readership and folded within a year. The comics from these two magazines were put back into Pilote.

In that same year, Dargaud announced that they had joined forces with René Goscinny and Albert Uderzo to create the Idéfix Studios, which only produced two feature films The Twelve Tasks of Asterix and La Ballade des Dalton. The rights to these films are still controlled by Dargaud's Mediatoon division.

In 1988, after Georges Dargaud retired his company Dargaud was acquired by Média-Participations. Two years later, it sold the weekly gardening and do-it-yourself magazine Rustica to Média-Participations as well.

In 1992, the publisher Le Lombard became a part of Dargaud, followed in 1993 by Les Éditions Blake et Mortimer. Over the course of the 1990s, Dargaud subsequently acquired several audiovisual production companies, including Citel in 1994, Marina Productions in 1997, and Millésime Productions in 1998. The latter two, specialized in television animation, joined in 1999 to create Dargaud Marina, later renamed Dargaud Media.

Over the course of the 1990s Dargaud subsequently acquired several audiovisual production companies, including Citel in 1994 and in June 1997, Dargaud acquired French animation & production company Marina Productions which was founded by Claude Berthier, Dargaud's acquisition of Marina Productions had increaaed Dargaud's animation output & stregnthed the production activities of its parent Média-Participations with Marina Productions being placed under Dargaud's film & television production division Dargaud Films thrus becoming Dargaud's own animation subsidiary within Dargaud Films. One year later in June 1998 following Dargaud's acquisition of Marina Productions, Dargaud had expanded their animation and productions operations by acquiring a majority interest in French production company Millésime Productions which was headed by Gaspard de Chavagnac with Dargaud combining Marina and Millésime's functions into one group with Gaspard de Chavagnac heading Dargaud's two production companies. The following year at the start of 1999, Dargaud's film & television division Dargaud Film announced that they have merged their own animation production companies Marina Productions and Millésime Productions into one entity animation production division named Dargaud Marina with the merged group will handle their projects annually.

At the end of the 1990s, Dargaud created manga publisher Kana, followed by Lucky Comics, centered on the series Lucky Luke.

On July 22, 2003, Dargaud and its media entertainment conglomerate & parent Média-Participations had brought Paris-based animation production studio Ellipsanime from its previous parent company Canal+ through their division StudioExpand, the acquisition gave both Dargaud and its parent Média-Participations another animation production studio with Dargaud assuming all ownership of Ellipsanime's production activities alongside its animated programming portfolio (including Tintin and Babar), which further increased Dargaud's animated programming catalogue with its distribution division Dargaud Distribution (now Mediatoon Distribution) taking over Ellipsanime's production library along with their future production projects.

In 2008, Dargaud founded the foreign rights agency Mediatoon Licensing, and in 2015, it joined with twelve other European comics publishing actors to create Europe Comics, a digital initiative co-funded by the European Commission's Creative Europe program.

In 2014, Dargaud acquired the assets of the now defunct Moonscoop Group, which includes the rights to series such as Hero: 108 and Code Lyoko.

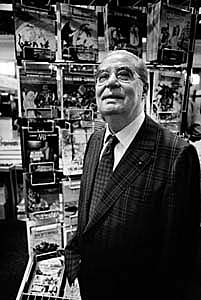
Georges Dargaud in 1988

=== Foreign imprints ===
Outside of France, imprints include Dargaud USA, Dargaud Canada, and Hodder-Dargaud in the United Kingdom.

== Selected titles ==
- Asterix - Albert Uderzo and René Goscinny
- Barbe rouge - Jean-Michel Charlier, Victor Hubinon etc.
- Black Moon Chronicles - Olivier Ledroit and François Marcela-Froideval
- Blacksad - Juan Diaz Canales and Juanjo Guarnido
- Blake and Mortimer - Edgar Pierre Jacobs etc.
- Blueberry - Jean-Michel Charlier, Jean Giraud etc.
- Djinn - Jean Dufaux and Ana Mirallès
- Lucky Luke - Morris, René Goscinny etc. (on Lucky Comics, joint venture between Lucky Productions and Dargaud)
- Philemon - Fred
- Tanguy et Laverdure - Jean-Michel Charlier, Albert Uderzo, Jijé etc.
- The Vagabond of Limbo - Christian Godard, Julio Ribera
- Valérian - Pierre Christin and Jean-Claude Mézières
- XIII - Jean van Hamme and William Vance
