= Pierre Tchernia =

French producer, screenwriter, presenter, animator and actor

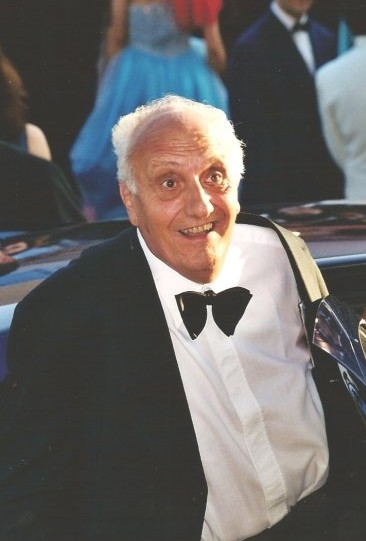
- Tchernia at the 2001 Cannes Film Festival
- Born: Pierre Tcherniakowski; 29 January 1928; Paris, France
- Died: 8 October 2016 (aged 88); Paris, France
- Occupations: Journalist; TV host Screenwriter; Director; Producer

Pierre Tcherniakowski (29 January 1928 – 8 October 2016), better known as Pierre Tchernia, was a French television journalist and filmmaker. A familiar media personality in France for several decades, he also worked in film as a screenwriter, director, producer, animator and occasional actor. He was known in France as "Magic" Tchernia and Monsieur Cinema.

== Early life ==
Born in Paris as Pierre Tcherniakowski, he was the youngest of four children. His father, a Ukrainian immigrant, was an engineer and his mother a seamstress. He grew up in Courbevoie. In 1940, at age 12, he saw John Ford's Western Stagecoach and was inspired to work in cinema. After graduation, he enrolled in a film and photography technical school, and then joined the Institute for Advanced Cinematographic Studies.

== Career ==
He was part of the creation of the first televised news in France in 1949 and was an early French news presenter. In 1955 he became a producer of animation (with a heavy influence from the early animation of Walt Disney). For many years he hosted a television game show of movie trivia, Monsieur Cinéma (in French). He was also host or presenter for various French talk, variety, quiz and music shows over the years such as La Clé des champs. Tchernia was the regular French commentator in the Eurovision Song Contest on 14 occasions from 1958 until 1974.

On 14 July 2011, he became Commandeur of the Legion of Honor.

== Asterix ==
A good friend of René Goscinny and Albert Uderzo, the creators of Asterix, he narrated many of the Asterix films in the original French, and wrote the screenplay for four of them. He was also caricatured numerous times in the series:

- initially in Pilote 306 he is shown interviewing Asterix about the upcoming story Asterix in Britain
- in Asterix the Legionary he is pictured as one of the Roman officers around Caesar's map table
- in Pilote 556 the announcement page for Asterix in Switzerland has him hosting a game show with Asterix as guest and Goscinny & Uderzo as contestants
- in Asterix in Corsica he is "Centurion Hippopotamus" of the Roman camp of Totorum (same character is used in "Asterix Versus Caesar” animated movie)
- in Asterix and Caesar's Gift he appears as one of the soldiers being demobbed
- in Obelix and Co. he is part of the demoralized troop being replaced at the start of the story—drinking from an amphora of wine, he is seen being carried out by caricatures of Goscinny and Uderzo
- in Asterix in Belgium he is a legionary who has no problem with being beaten up by Obelix after having been stationed in Belgium
- in The Twelve Tasks of Asterix he is the Roman Prefect in a bureaucratic office known as "The Place That Sends You Mad."

His caricature can also be found in the Lucky Luke animated film La Ballade des Dalton (1978), where he is depicted on a picture on the wall, when Luke visits the character Thaddeus Collins.

== Filmography (selected) ==
- 1949 part of the first French television news
- 1961 L'Ami Public n°1 — host of a series on the films of Walt Disney
- 1961 La Belle Américaine — screenwriter/cameo
- 1963 Carom Shots — screenwriter
- 1965 Pleins feux sur Stanislas — actor
- 1966 won the Rose d'Or (Golden Rose) at the Montreux festival
- 1966 Monsieur Cinéma television quiz show (host)
- 1968 Asterix and Cleopatra — screenwriter/film adaption
- 1971 Daisy Town (Lucky Luke) — lyrics
- 1976 The Twelve Tasks of Asterix — screenwriter/narrator in the original French
- 1978 The Ballad of the Dalton Gang (Lucky Luke) — screenwriter
- 1985 Asterix Versus Caesar — screenwriter
- 1986 Asterix in Britain — screenwriter/film adaption
- 2002 Asterix and Obelix: Mission Cleopatra — played "Caius Gaspachoandalus"/narrator in the original French
- 2006 Asterix and the Vikings — narrator in the original French
