= René Goscinny =

French comic book writer (1926–1977)

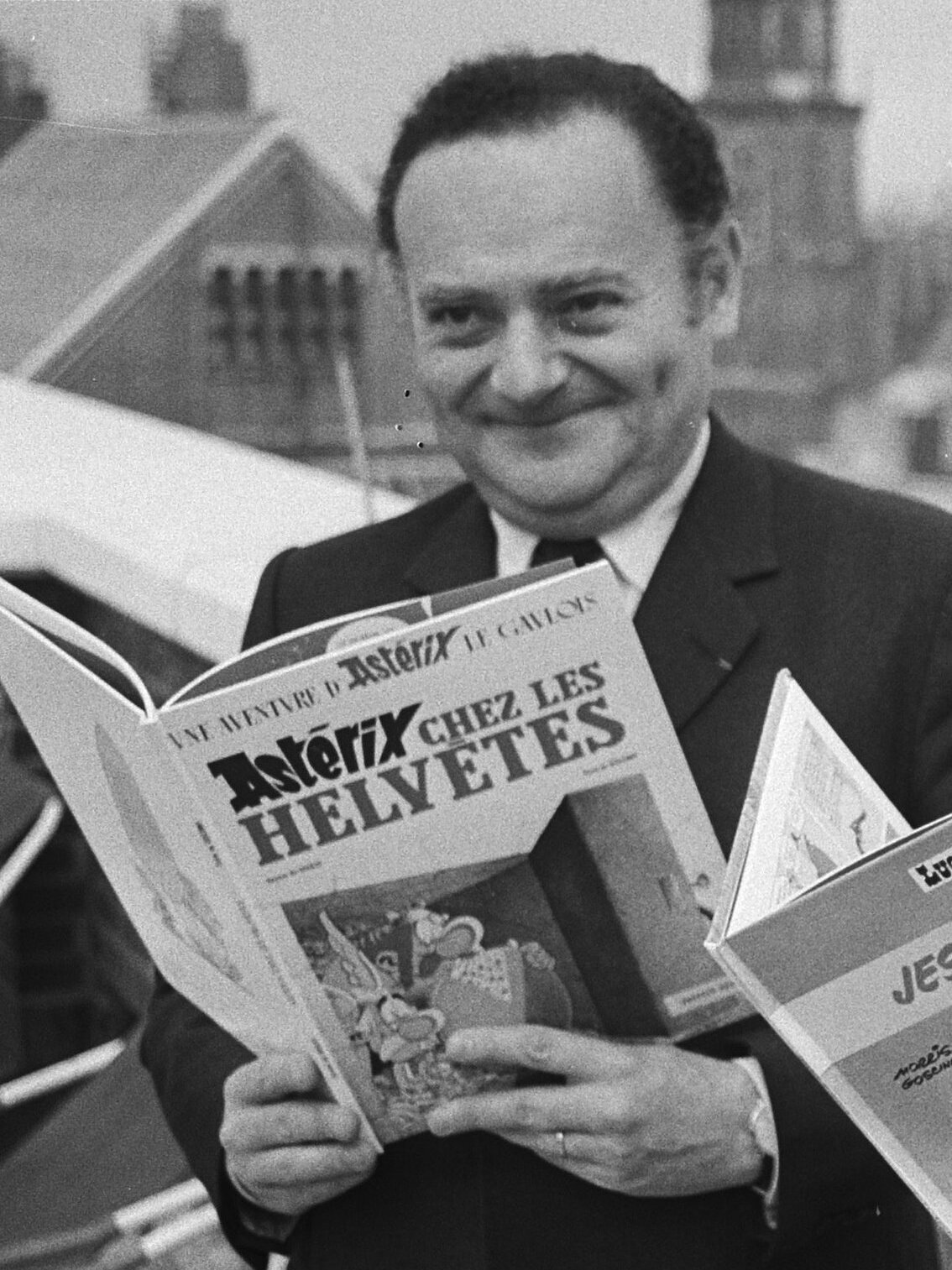
- Goscinny in 1971
- Born: 14 August 1926 Paris, France
- Died: 5 November 1977 (aged 51) Paris, France
- Areas: Cartoonist, Writer, Editor
- Pseudonyms: d'Agostini, Stanislas
- Notable works: Astérix; Iznogoud; Le Petit Nicolas; Lucky Luke; Oumpah-pah
- Collaborators: Albert Uderzo; Jean-Jacques Sempé; Morris; Marcel Gotlib; Jean Tabary
- Awards: Full list
- Spouse: Gilberte Pollaro-Millo (m. 1967)
- Children: 1

René Goscinny (French: [ʁəne ɡɔsini]; Polish: [ɡɔɕˈt͡ɕin.nɘ̟]; 14 August 1926 – 5 November 1977) was a French comic editor and writer, who created the Asterix comic book series with illustrator Albert Uderzo. Born in France to a Jewish family from Poland, he spent his childhood in Argentina where he attended French schools and later lived in the United States for a short period of time. There he met Belgian cartoonist Morris. After his return to France, they collaborated for more than 20 years on the comic series Lucky Luke (in what was considered the series' golden age).

He wrote Iznogoud with Jean Tabary. Goscinny also wrote a series of children's books known as Le Petit Nicolas ("Little Nicolas") illustrated by Jean-Jacques Sempé.

== Early life ==
Goscinny was born in Paris in 1926 to Jewish immigrants from Poland. His parents were Stanisław Simkha Gościnny, a chemical engineer from Warsaw, and Anna (Hanna) Bereśniak-Gościnna from Chodorków (modern-day Khodorkiv), a small village near Kiev in Ukraine. Goscinny's maternal grandfather, Abraham Lazare Berezniak, founded a printing company. Claude, Goscinny's older brother, was six years older, born on 10 December 1920.

Stanisław and Anna had met in Paris and married in 1919. When René was two, the Gościnnys moved to Buenos Aires, Argentina, where his father had been hired as a chemical engineer. René had a happy childhood in Buenos Aires and studied in French-language schools there. He was often the class clown, probably to compensate for a natural shyness. He started drawing very early on, inspired by the illustrated stories which he enjoyed reading. He used to spend his summer holidays in Piriápolis, Uruguay.

In December 1943, the year after Goscinny graduated from lycée, or high school, his father died of a cerebral hemorrhage (stroke). The youth had to go to work. The next year, he landed his first job as an assistant accountant in a tyre recovery factory. After being laid off the following year, Goscinny became a junior illustrator in an advertising agency.

Goscinny, along with his mother, left Argentina and immigrated to New York, United States, in 1945 to join her brother Boris. To avoid military service in the U.S. he travelled to France to enlist in the French Army in 1946. He served at Aubagne in the 141st Alpine Infantry Battalion. Promoted to senior corporal, he became the appointed artist of the regiment and drew illustrations and posters for the army.

== First works ==
The following year, Goscinny worked on an illustrated version of the Balzac novella The Girl with the Golden Eyes. In April of that year he returned to New York.

There he went through the most difficult period of his life. For a while, Goscinny was jobless, alone, and living in poverty. By 1948, though, he had begun working in a small studio, where he became friends with future MAD Magazine contributors Will Elder, Jack Davis, and Harvey Kurtzman. Goscinny became art director at Kunen Publishers, where he wrote four books for children.

Around this time he met two Belgian comic artists, Joseph Gillain, better known as Jijé, and Maurice de Bevere, also known as Morris. Morris lived in the US for six years, having already started his cartoon series Lucky Luke. (He and Goscinny collaborated on this, with Goscinny writing it from 1955 until his death in 1977, a period described as its golden age).

Georges Troisfontaines, chief of the World Press agency, convinced Goscinny to return to France in 1951 in order to work for his agency as the head of the Paris office. There he met Albert Uderzo, with whom he started a longtime collaboration. They started out with some work for Bonnes Soirées, a women's magazine for which Goscinny wrote Sylvie. Goscinny and Uderzo also launched the series Jehan Pistolet and Luc Junior, in the magazine La Libre Junior.

In 1955, Goscinny, together with Uderzo, Jean-Michel Charlier, and Jean Hébrad, founded the syndicate Edipress/Edifrance. The syndicate launched publications such as Clairon for the factory union and Pistolin for a chocolate company. Goscinny and Uderzo cooperated on the series Bill Blanchart in Jeannot, Pistolet in Pistolin, and Benjamin et Benjamine in the magazine of the same name. Under the pseudonym Agostini, Goscinny wrote Le Petit Nicolas for Jean-Jacques Sempé in Le Moustique. It was later published in Sud-Ouest and Pilote magazines.

In 1956, Goscinny began a collaboration with Tintin magazine. He wrote some short stories for Jo Angenot and Albert Weinberg, and worked on Signor Spaghetti with Dino Attanasio, Monsieur Tric with Bob de Moor, Prudence Petitpas with Maurice Maréchal, Globul le Martien and Alphonse with Tibet, Strapontin with Berck and Modeste et Pompon with André Franquin. An early creation with Uderzo, Oumpah-pah, was also adapted for serial publication in Tintin from 1958 to 1962. In addition, Goscinny appeared in the magazines Paris-Flirt (Lili Manequin with Will) and Vaillant (Boniface et Anatole with Jordom, Pipsi with Godard).

== Pilote and Astérix (1959) ==
In 1959, the Édifrance/Édipresse syndicate started the Franco-Belgian comics magazine Pilote. Goscinny became one of the most productive writers for the magazine. In the magazine's first issue, he launched Astérix, with Uderzo. The series was an instant hit and remains popular worldwide. Goscinny also restarted the series Le Petit Nicolas and Jehan Pistolet, now called Jehan Soupolet. Goscinny also began Jacquot le Mousse and Tromblon et Bottaclou with Godard.

The magazine was bought by Georges Dargaud in 1960, and Goscinny became editor-in-chief. He also began new series like Les Divagations de Monsieur Sait-Tout (with Martial), La Potachologie Illustrée (with Cabu), Les Dingodossiers (with Gotlib) and La Forêt de Chênebeau (with Mic Delinx). With Tabary, he launched Calife Haroun El Poussah in Record, a series that was later continued in Pilote as Iznogoud. With Raymond Macherot he created Pantoufle for Spirou.

== Family ==
Goscinny married Gilberte Pollaro-Millo in 1967. In 1968, their daughter Anne Goscinny was born. She also became an author.

Anne Goscinny co-wrote the screenplay for Little Nicholas: Happy As Can Be, a 2022 animation film with Michel Fessler and Massoubre based on the children's book series Le Petit Nicolas that her father created.

== Death ==
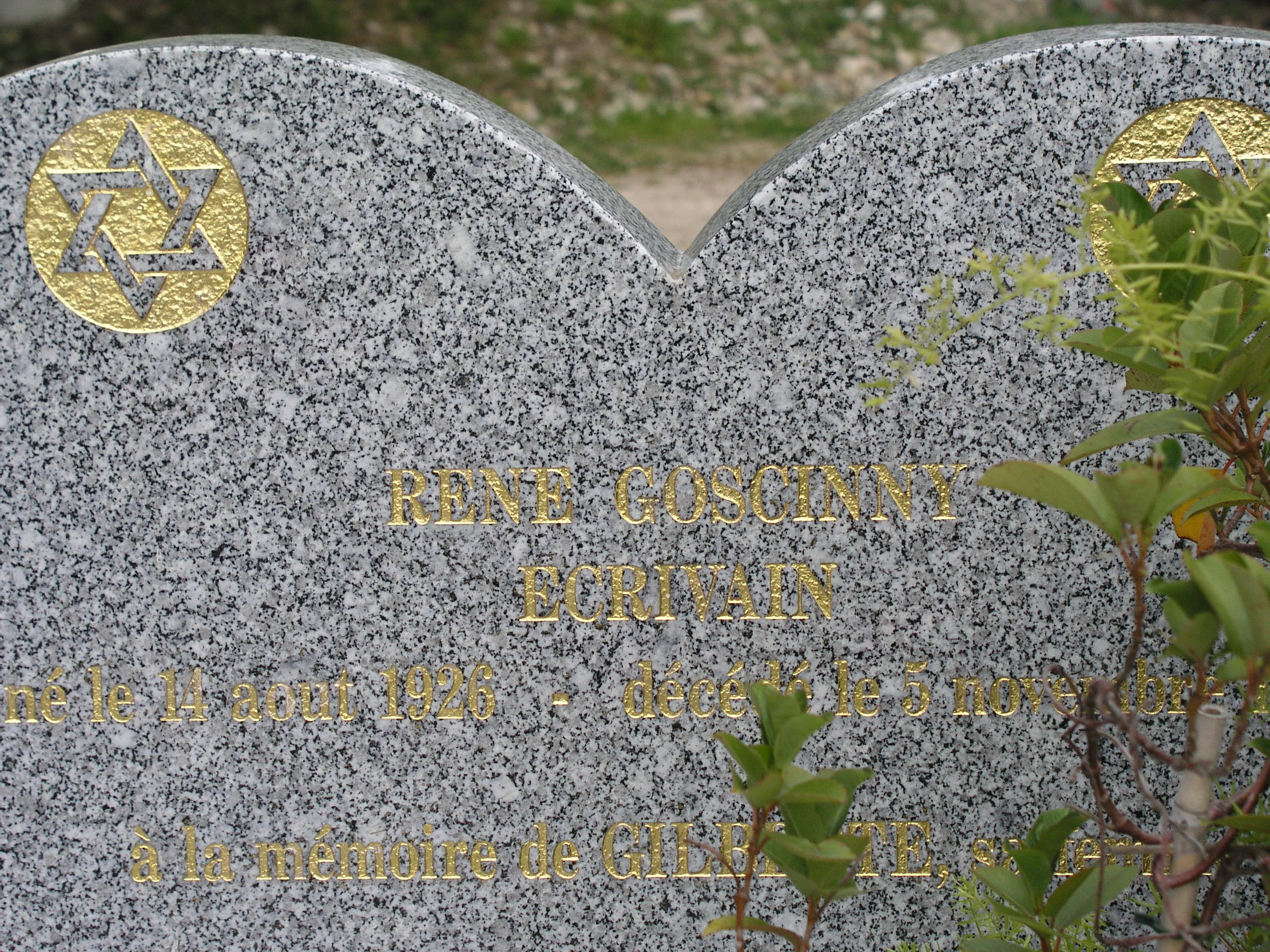
Goscinny's tombstone in Nice

Goscinny died at 51, in Paris of a heart attack on 5 November 1977, during a routine stress test at his doctor's office. He was buried in the Jewish Cemetery in Nice. In accordance with his will, most of his money was transferred to the chief rabbinate of France.

Goscinny's death occurred part-way through the writing of Asterix in Belgium (published in 1979, two years after his death). As a homage to Goscinny, Uderzo drew darkened skies and rain into the comic. The last panel on page 32 and all but the last panel on page 33 were drawn with grey skies and rain to mark the point at which Goscinny died. Most of the remaining panels in the book were drawn with leaden grey skies, but none have rain. There is a further tribute at the end of the book: near the lower left corner of the final panel, Uderzo drew a rabbit sadly looking over its shoulders towards Goscinny's signature. Regrettably, as printed (at least in the German edition) the outlines are too thick, even at 10X magnification, to make clear what the rabbit is doing.

After Goscinny's death, Uderzo began to write Asterix himself and continued the series, although at a much slower pace, until passing the series over in 2011 to writer Jean-Yves Ferri and illustrator Didier Conrad. Tabary similarly began to write Iznogoud himself, whereas Morris continued Lucky Luke with various other writers.

As a further tribute to Goscinny, Uderzo gave his late colleague's likeness to the Jewish character Saul ben Ephishul (a play on "it's all beneficial"; Saül Péhyé, a play on ça eût payé and therefore a sketch by Fernand Reynaud, in the original French, Saul Nizahle, a play on soll nicht zahlen, in the German edition) in the 1981 album L'Odyssée d'Astérix ("Asterix and the Black Gold"), which is dedicated to Goscinny's memory.

== Awards and honors ==
- 1974: Adamson Award for best international comic strip artist, Sweden
- 2005: Inducted in the Will Eisner Hall of Fame as a Judges' choice, U.S.

Since 1996, the René Goscinny Award is presented at the yearly Angoulême International Comics Festival in France as an encouragement for young comic writers.

According to UNESCO's Index Translationum, Goscinny, as of August 2017, was the 20th most-translated author, with 2,200 translations of his work.

On 23 January 2020, a life-sized bronze statue of Goscinny was unveiled near his former home in Paris. It was the first public statue in Paris dedicated to a comic book author.

== Filmography ==
Year	Title	Role	Notes
1968	Asterix and Cleopatra	Co-director	Also voiced Commentator (uncredited)
1976	The Twelve Tasks of Asterix	Co-director, co-writer, co-producer	
1978	La Ballade des Dalton	Jolly Jumper, Lucky Luke's horse	Voice, (final film role)

== Studios Idéfix ==
Studios Idéfix
- Founded: 1 April 1974
- Founders: René Goscinny; Georges Dargaud; Albert Uderzo; Morris
- Defunct: 1 April 1978
- Fate: Closed due to the death of Goscinny

Studios Idéfix was an animation studio founded on 1 April 1974 by Goscinny, Uderzo and Morris.

Its logo, designed by Uderzo, is a parody of MGM's logo, with Dogmatix (known in French as Idéfix) instead of Leo and a banner reading "Delirant Isti Romani", instead of "Ars Gratia Artis".

=== History ===
In the fall of 1973, Goscinny, Uderzo, Morris and their publisher Georges Dargaud joined forces to create their own animation studio, the Idéfix studios. At the time, launching the creation of a cartoon feature film in France was complex, considering that France no longer had a major animation studio ever since the closure in 1952 of Les Gémeaux, ruined by the project of The Shepherdess and the Chimney Sweep.

Prior to Idéfix, the works of the founders were animated and adapted to films by Belvision Studios, based at Brussels in Belgium. As the founders themselves said,

Goscinny and I were very unhappy watching the previous films, even if the public had followed them. The first two films were not a claim to fame for us. And we had to go through the premieres several times… By dint of seeing these flaws again and again, which we felt more and more because we knew them better, they had become enormous! For this one, we can avoid this kind of thing. Goscinny and I are doing the storyboarding and we hope to oversee everything. Because this time the cartoon will be produced in Paris, by a studio that we created ourselves. We will be both authors and directors, we will work really closely with the animators. If we're embarking on this adventure, it's because we've pulled out all the stops!

— Albert Uderzo

It's an old childhood dream that we had with Albert Uderzo, who actually started out in cartoons. It's the culmination of ten years of work, because we started making cartoons in other studios. It took ten years before we could have our own studios and make the films the way we wanted them. We did it, I must say, thanks to Asterix, who is a miracle character and who is our star, and who allowed us in many ways to realize this dream.

— René Goscinny

René Goscinny called Henri Gruel to constitute the technical and artistic teams of the Idéfix studios. The latter directed several animated short films and was responsible for the sound effects of Asterix the Gaul and Asterix and Cleopatra, as well as the two productions by Pierre Tchernia scripted by Goscinny, Le Viager and Les Gaspards. Gruel gets Goscinny to share the artistic direction of the studios with Pierre Watrin, whom he considers to be an excellent designer, one of Paul Grimault's best former animators. Over several months, Gruel and Watrin contacted former artists and animators, as well as promising young artists. Most of Paul Grimault's former animators then worked in small cartoon structures, and would be interested in the idea of working again in a real studio. However, the search for Pierre Watrin and Henri Gruel ultimately proved difficult, most of the former employees of the Les Gémeaux studios having converted to illustration and advertising. Talent was lacking and, at Goscinny's request, Henri Gruel sent his friend Serge Caillet, production director on live-action films, to the Paris Chamber of Commerce and Industry to demand the opening of an animated cinema section to supply the studios with young artists, who thus offer employment to students as soon as they leave school. Eventually, they managed to produce their first feature film, The Twelve Tasks of Asterix, with Halas and Batchelor and Dargaud.

However, in 1977, during the production of their second (and final) production, Goscinny died of a sudden heart attack. So, after the release of their second feature, The Ballad of the Daltons, a Lucky Luke feature, the studio ceased operations and closed shop permanently.

=== Films produced ===
Studio Idéfix produced only two feature films, namely,

- The Twelve Tasks of Asterix (1976)
- The Ballad of the Daltons (1978)

== Bibliography ==
Series	Years	Magazine	Albums	Editor	Artist
Lucky Luke^{[b]}	1955–1977	Spirou and Pilote	38	Dupuis and Dargaud	Morris
Modeste et Pompon^{[a]}^{[b]}	1955–1958	Tintin	2	Lombard	André Franquin
Prudence Petitpas	1957–1959	Tintin		Lombard	Maurice Maréchal
Signor Spaghetti	1957–1965	Tintin	15	Lombard	Dino Attanasio
Oumpah-pah	1958–1962	Tintin	3	Lombard	Albert Uderzo
Strapontin	1958–1964	Tintin	4	Lombard	Berck
Astérix^{[b]}	1959–1977	Pilote	24	Dargaud	Albert Uderzo
Le Petit Nicolas	1959–1965	Pilote	5	Denoël	Sempé
Iznogoud^{[b]}	1962–1977	Record and Pilote	14	Dargaud	Jean Tabary
Les Dingodossiers	1965–1967	Pilote	3	Dargaud	Gotlib

- a. As part of a writers' team coming up with gags.
- b. The series Lucky Luke, Modeste et Pompon, Asterix and Iznogoud were continued by other writers after Goscinny's death.
