= Albert Uderzo =

French comic book artist (1927–2020)

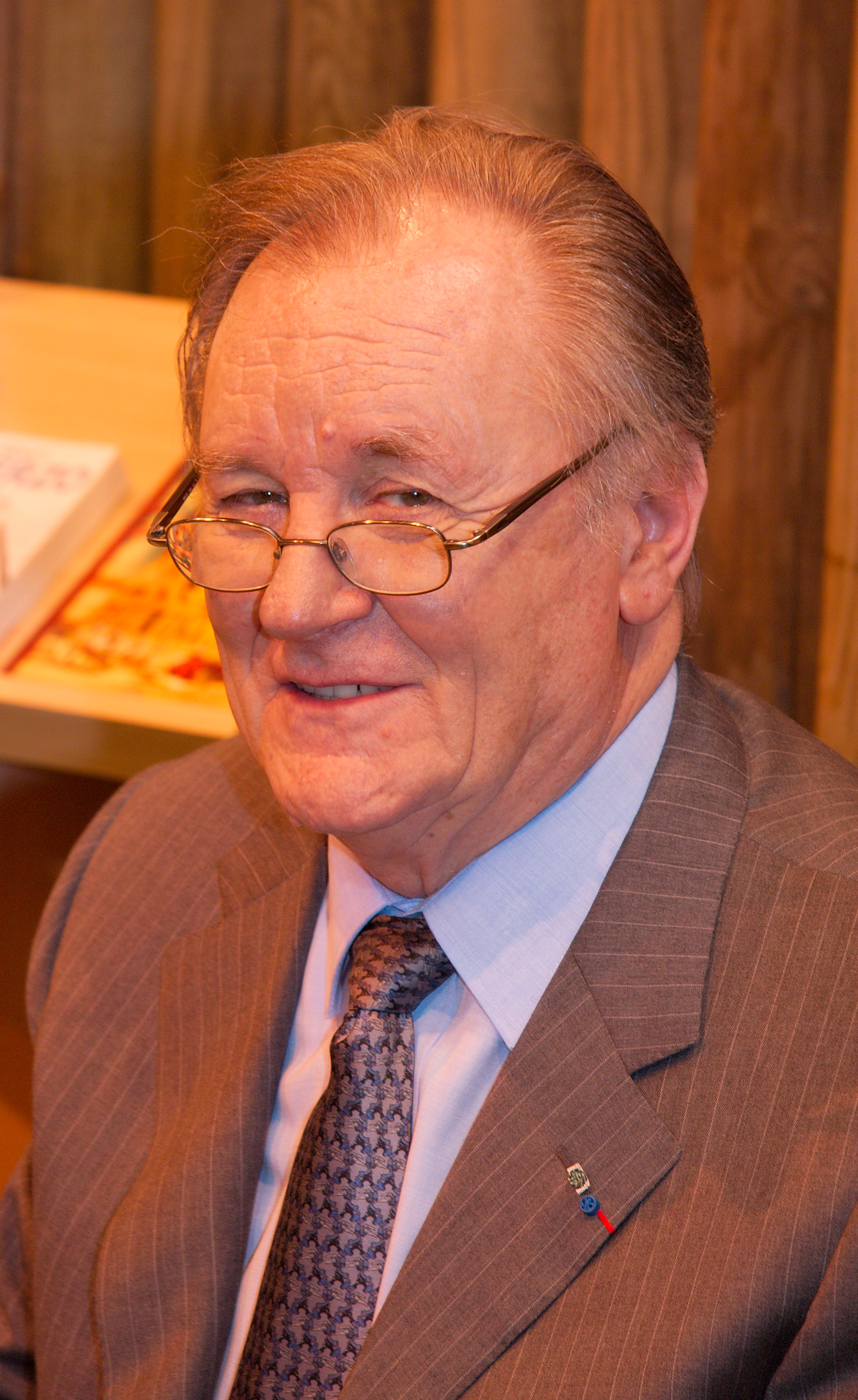
- Uderzo in 2008
- Born: Alberto Aleandro Uderzo; 25 April 1927 Fismes, France
- Died: 24 March 2020 (aged 92) Neuilly-sur-Seine, France
- Areas: Writer, Artist
- Notable works: Astérix; Tanguy et Laverdure; Oumpah-pah
- Collaborators: René Goscinny
- Awards: full list
- Relatives: Marcel Uderzo (brother)

Alberto Aleandro Uderzo (Italian: [alˈbɛrto aleˈandro uˈdɛrtso]; 25 April 1927 – 24 March 2020), better known as Albert Uderzo (French: [albɛʁ ydɛʁzo]), was a French comic book artist and scriptwriter. He is best known as the co-creator and illustrator of the Astérix series in collaboration with René Goscinny. He also drew other comics such as Oumpah-pah, again with Goscinny. Uderzo retired in September 2011.

== Early life ==
Uderzo was born in Fismes in the Marne department of France on 25 April 1927 as the fourth child of Italian immigrants Silvio Uderzo (1888–1985), a carpenter, and his wife Iria Uderzo (née Crestini, 1897–1997). His parents had met in 1915 in La Spezia, where Silvio Uderzo was recovering after being wounded while serving in the Royal Italian Army during World War I. Uderzo's mother, Iria Crestini, was working in the arsenals of La Spezia, along with many young Italian women at the time. Silvio was discharged from military service after the war, on 19 June 1919. The two became a couple and married shortly before the birth of their first child, Bruno (1920–2004). After Bruno, they had Rina in 1922. They moved from Italy to France with their then two children, first settling in Chauny in the Aisne departement. They changed location regularly. In Chauny, a son named Albert was born in 1925 but died of pneumonia at the age of 8 months. The Uderzos decided to name their next son in honor of the late brother. The name "Albert", that of the deceased brother, became the Italian "Alberto" because the registrar misunderstood Silvio Uderzo's heavy Italian accent. The name "Aleandro" is in honor of Uderzo's paternal grandfather.

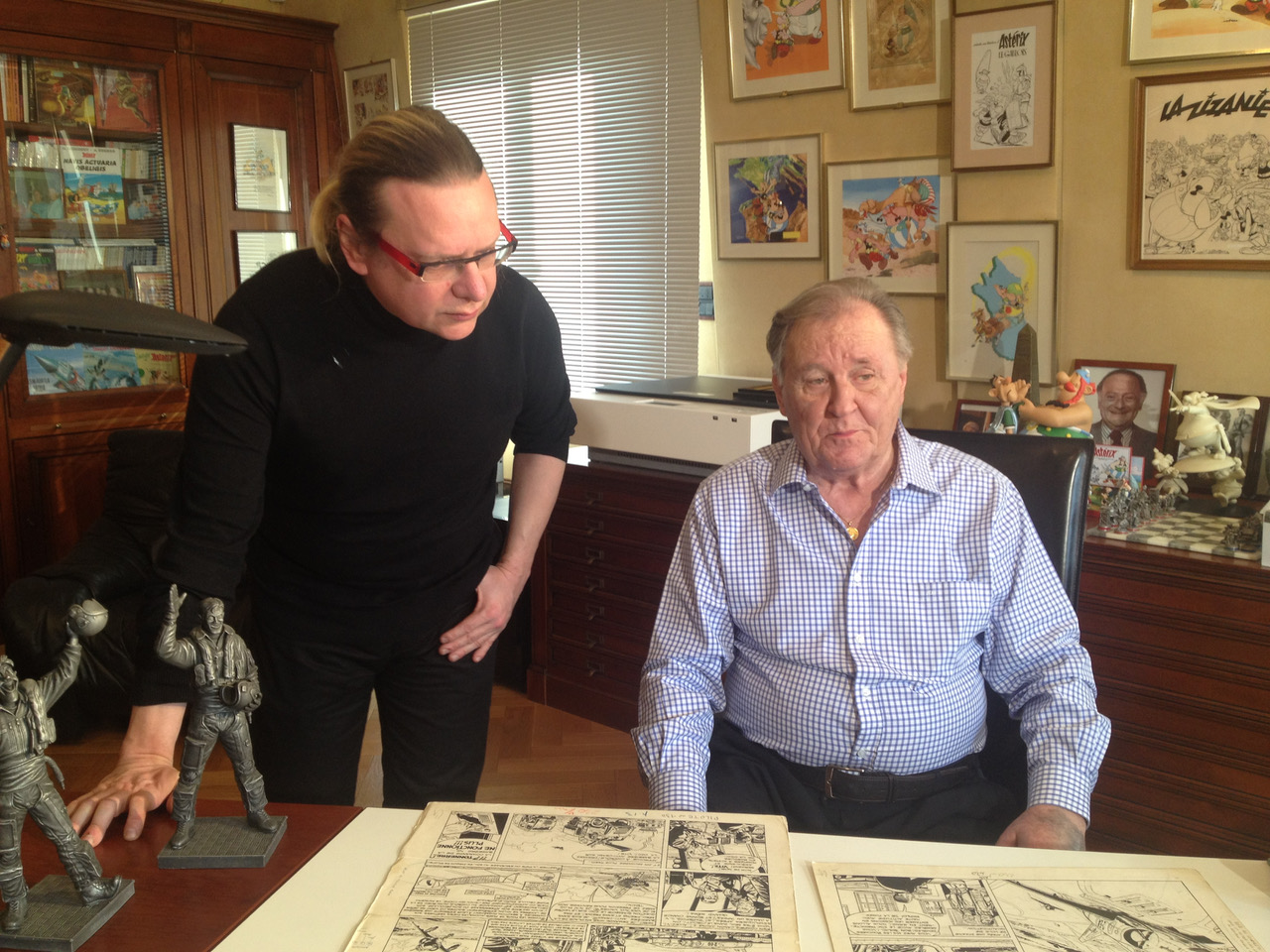
Uderzo in his home studio in Neuilly-sur-Seine near Paris, 2014

Uderzo was born on the morning of 25 April 1927 around 07:00. At this point, he was an Italian citizen rather than a French one. Uderzo was born with six fingers on each hand. The additional fingers were surgically removed early in childhood as a precaution, as the infant Uderzo would sometimes violently pull on them when enraged or annoyed.

In 1929, the Uderzos moved to Clichy-sous-Bois in the eastern suburbs of Paris, the capital city of France. Here, Uderzo experienced elements of xenophobia against Italian immigrants during his childhood, even though he gained French citizenship in the year 1934. Clichy-sous-Bois, at the time a very politically left-leaning political district, held deep popular sentiments against Mussolini's dictatorship and its involvement in the Spanish Civil War. Uderzo at one particular point became the target of the anger of a victim of Italian-German bombardment in the Spanish Civil War, and said a man spat in his face. However, apart from the occasional ethnic resentment against Italians, Uderzo viewed his childhood and education in Clichy-sous-Bois fondly in retrospect. His mother gave birth to two more children: Jeanne was born in 1932 and Marcel in 1933.

Uderzo came in touch with the arts for the first time during kindergarten, where he was noted as talented for his age. Most of his siblings also shared certain artistic talents, and their mother used sheets of paper and pencils to give the children, especially her oldest son Bruno, something to do. Bruno became an inspiration for Albert and in turn, soon noted the younger brother's talent. At this point, Albert did not yet aim to become a professional artist later in life and instead dreamt about a career as a clown and, after dropping that aspiration, aimed to follow Bruno into the craft of aircraft engineering. At the same time, he came in contact with the American comic and animated cartoon cultures, particularly with the early works of Walt Disney like Mickey Mouse and Donald Duck. The family moved to the Rue de Montreuil in the 11th arrondissement of Paris in October 1938, changing both schools and the social vicinity. Although Albert, now with a Parisian accent, was no longer easily recognized as of Italian heritage, he nonetheless had problems in school. His only successful area in his educational pursuits was sketching and the arts. It would take him until around the age of 11 or 12 to go from sketching to painting in colors, however, which was when his parents discovered that Uderzo was color blind. From then on, Uderzo would use labels on his colors, but as he mostly stuck with black-and-white sketching, it would not make a huge impact on his artistic career either way.

In September 1939, Germany invaded Poland and France declared war on Germany in response. Albert's father Silvio, by then 51, was too old to be conscripted into the French army, whereas Albert himself was too young at 12. Bruno, however, was of military age and was called to action, which he survived without injury. Albert soon finished his basic education at the age of 13 and decided to follow Bruno into aircraft engineering.

== Working with Goscinny ==
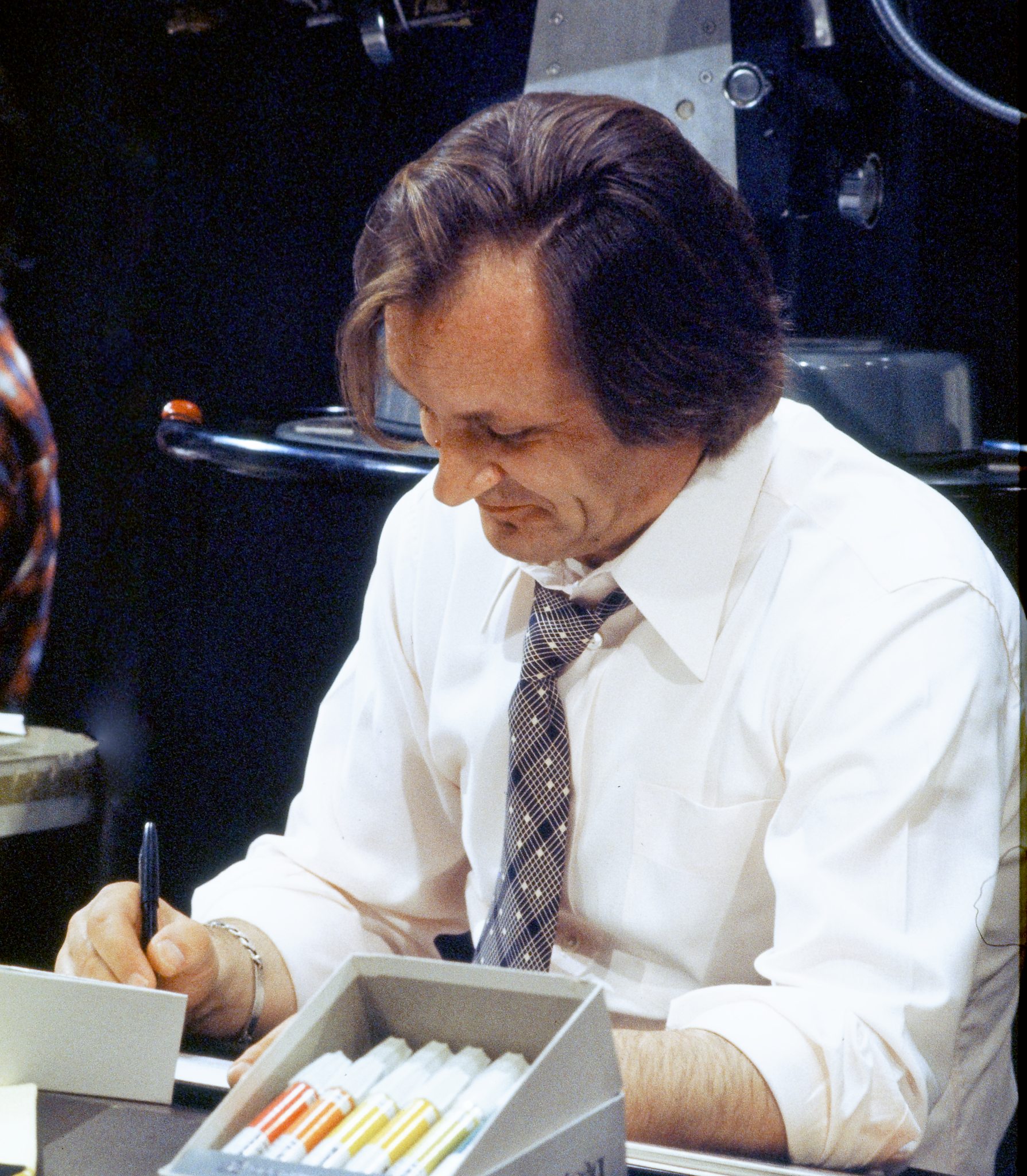
Uderzo in Montreal, 1973

After working on various creations and travelling for the next few years, Uderzo met René Goscinny in 1951. The two men quickly became good friends, and decided to work together in 1952 at the newly opened Paris office of the Belgian company, World Press. Their first creations were the characters Oumpah-pah, Jehan Pistolet and Luc Junior. In 1958 they adapted Oumpah-pah for serial publication in the Franco-Belgian comics magazine Tintin, where it ran until 1962. In 1959 Goscinny and Uderzo became editor and artistic director (respectively) of Pilote magazine, a new venture aimed at older children. The magazine's first issue introduced Astérix to the French world, and it was an instant hit. During this period Uderzo also collaborated with Jean-Michel Charlier on the realistic series Michel Tanguy, later named Les Aventures de Tanguy et Laverdure.

Astérix was serialised in Pilote, and in 1961 the first story Astérix le Gaulois (Asterix the Gaul) was published as an individual album. New Astérix albums were regularly published by the duo over the next sixteen years, until Goscinny’s sudden death in 1977. Thereafter Uderzo continued to write and illustrate the books on his own, published by his own publishing house "Albert René", though at a significantly slower pace (averaging one edition every three to five years compared to two editions a year when working with Goscinny).

== Family ==
Uderzo married Ada Milani in 1953 and had one daughter Sylvie Uderzo (b. 1956).

After Uderzo fired Sylvie and her husband in 2007 as managers of his estate and agreed to sell his share of Éditions Albert René to Hachette Livre, Sylvie accused him in a column in Le Monde, that with this sale to a corporation it was "as if the gates of the Gaulish village had been thrown open to the Roman Empire". Uderzo had previously stated in interviews that Asterix would end with his death; however, the terms of the sale to Hachette allowed the company to continue producing Asterix titles indefinitely with or without Uderzo's participation. Uderzo in 2013 sued his daughter and son-in-law for "psychological violence". Sylvie responded with a lawsuit claiming persons unnamed had abused her father's "frailty". Her case was thrown out of court in 2014 and the two reached an amicable settlement.

Upon Uderzo's retirement in 2011, Asterix was taken over by Jean-Yves Ferri (script) and Didier Conrad (art).

Sylvie owned 40% of Éditions Albert René before selling her parts to Hachette. The publishing group now owns 100%, after the remaining 60%, previously owned by Uderzo and by Goscinny's daughter, were also sold to Hachette Livre.

Uderzo's brother, Marcel, was also a cartoonist. Marcel Uderzo worked with his brother Albert for the drawing and coloring of about twelve Asterix albums.

== Death ==
On 24 March 2020, Uderzo died in his sleep at his home in Neuilly-sur-Seine, after suffering a heart attack, at the age of 92.

== Awards ==
- 1985: Awarded the Knight of the Legion of Honour
- 1999: Grand Prix de la ville d'Angoulême, special prize for the millennium
- 2003: Commandeur de l'Ordre des Arts et des Lettres
- 2004: Max & Moritz Prize Special Prize for outstanding life's work
- 2005: Inducted into the Eisner Award Hall of Fame, U.S.
- 2006: Awarded the Knight of the Order of the Netherlands Lion
- 2013: Awarded the Officer of the Legion of Honour

According to the UNESCO's Index Translationum, Uderzo is the 10th most often translated French language author (Goscinny being 4th) and the third most often translated French language comics author behind René Goscinny and Hergé.
