= Henri Attal =

French actor

- Born: 13 May 1936; Paris, France
- Died: 24 July 2003 (aged 67); Cucq, France
- Occupation: actor
- Years active: 1959-2003

Henri Attal (1936–2003) was a French actor.

== Selected filmography ==
- Asphalte (1959) - Bit Part (uncredited)
- Les Bonnes Femmes (1960) - Un ami de Jane et Jacqueline (uncredited)
- Les godelureaux (1961) - Un consommateur
- Goodbye Again (1961) - Man at Concert (uncredited)
- A Woman Is a Woman (1961) - Faux aveugle #2 (uncredited)
- Saint-Tropez Blues (1961) - Un marin (uncredited)
- Auguste (1961) - Un photographe (uncredited)
- Tales of Paris (1962) - Un passager du bus (segment "Sophie") (uncredited)
- L'assassin est dans l'annuaire (1962) - Un consommateur au café (uncredited)
- Girl on the Road (1962) - Un spectateur à la boxe (uncredited)
- Le Monte-charge (1962) - Un spectateur au cinéma (uncredited)
- Le Crime ne paie pas (1962) - Un inspecteur au cinéma (segment "L'homme de l'avenue") (uncredited)
- My Life to Live (1962) - Arthur
- Arsène Lupin Versus Arsène Lupin (1962) - Un gangster à l'enterrement (uncredited)
- Ophelia (1963) - Guard
- Vice and Virtue (1963) - Un civil de la gestapo
- Any Number Can Win (1963) - Le copain de Francis (uncredited)
- Les vierges (1963) - Le policier qui arrête le voyeur (uncredited)
- OSS 117 Is Unleashed (1963) - Manuel, un homme de main
- Méfiez-vous, mesdames (1963) - Jules
- Nutty, Naughty Chateau (1963) - Le policier #1
- L'assassin connaît la musique... (1963) - Un homme se promenant dans le magasin (uncredited)
- Let's Rob the Bank (1964) - Ramirez, un ouvrier (uncredited)
- Hardi Pardaillan! (1964) - Un homme du Duc de Guise
- La mort d'un tueur (1964)
- Du grabuge chez les veuves (1964) - Un bagagiste à Orly (uncredited)
- Les plus belles escroqueries du monde (1964) - (segment "L'homme qui vendit la Tour Eiffel") (uncredited)
- Backfire (1964) - Customer of Athens hotel (uncredited)
- Male Hunt (1964) - Un truand (uncredited)
- Fantômas (1964) - Un garde du corps / Bodyguard
- Le Tigre aime la chair fraiche (1964) - Le tueur de l'aéroport #2
- The Gorillas (1964) - La Tignasse (uncredited)
- The Vampire of Düsseldorf (1965) - Un ouvrier
- Furia à Bahia pour OSS 117 (1965) - Killer #1
- Marie-Chantal contre le docteur Kha (1965) - Dumont
- Pierrot le Fou (1965) - Gas station attendant #1 (uncredited)
- Pleins feux sur Stanislas (1965) - Un homme de main de James (uncredited)
- Fantômas se déchaîne (1965) - Le garde de Fantômas
- Paris in August (1966)
- Galia (1966) - Un employé de la morgue
- Masculin Féminin (1966) - L'autre lecteur du bouquin porno (uncredited)
- Your Money or Your Life (1966) - Le voyageur au chat
- Line of Demarcation (1966) - Un gendarme français
- Trap for the Assassin (1966) - Un policier / Un forçat
- Brigade antigangs (1966) - Le journaliste
- Fantômas contre Scotland Yard (1967) - Godfrey
- The Champagne Murders (1967) - Attacker in Dark Coat (uncredited)
- Mise à sac (1967) - Salsa
- Les grandes vacances (1967) - Un marin au bistrot (uncredited)
- Le pacha (1968) - (uncredited)
- Les Biches (1968) - Robègue
- Stephane (1969) - Man in cafe
- The Brain (1969) - Un homme de la bande
- Une veuve en or (1969) - Un membre de la bande à Rapha (uncredited)
- La Horse (1970) - Louis
- Borsalino (1970) - Le caissier du cercle (uncredited)
- Le gendarme en balade (1970)
- Le cinéma de papa (1971) - Un acteur
- Just Before Nightfall (1971) - Cavanna
- Jo (1971) - Grand Louis
- La grande maffia... (1971) - Un gangster (uncredited)
- Elle cause plus, elle flingue (1972) - L'affreux
- Dr. Popaul (1972) - La sourde
- Sex-shop (1972)
- Trop jolies pour être honnêtes (1972) - Un co-détenu
- The Hostage Gang (1973) - Prisonnier avec la soupe (uncredited)
- Don Juan, or If Don Juan Were a Woman (1973)
- Moi y'en a vouloir des sous (1973) - Un CRS
- The Train (1973) - Le chauffeur de la locomotive
- Ursule et Grelu (1974)
- Nada (1974)
- The Four Charlots Musketeers (1974)
- The Four Charlots Musketeers 2 (1974)
- Gross Paris (1974) - (uncredited)
- Borsalino & Co. (1974) - Un gardien à l'asile (uncredited)
- Pleasure Party (1975) - Le codétenu / The fellow
- Innocents with Dirty Hands (1975) - Un policier
- L'intrépide (1975)
- La Course à l'échalote (1975) - Le contrôleur
- The French Detective (1975) - Luigi
- Les grands moyens (1976)
- The Twist (1976) - Un consommateur / Customer
- Body of My Enemy Un agitateur (1976) - (uncredited)
- Bartleby (1976) - Un gardien de prison
- Le Gang (1977) - Un ami, client de La Belle Oseille, chez Cornélius
- Le roi des bricoleurs (1977) - L'ouvrier arabe
- Man in a Hurry (1977)
- Animal (1977) - Un assistant
- Le point de mire (1977)
- Et vive la liberté! (1978)
- Comment se faire réformer (1978) - Un médecin militaire
- La Zizanie (1978) - Un ouvrier
- Violette (1978)
- The Witness (1978) - Le garde-chasse
- La Carapate (1978) - Un détenu
- Les réformés se portent bien (1978)
- Once in Paris... (1978) - 2nd Chauffeur
- Plein les poches pour pas un rond... (1978) - Le pompiste
- Je vous ferai aimer la vie (1979) - Un employé du garage
- Cop or Hood (1979) - Le chef de transmission
- Le piège à cons (1979) - Le gardien de la propriété de Foron
- The Medic (1979) - Le soldat du convoi
- Les sous-doués (1980) - Mohammed
- The Umbrella Coup (1980) - (uncredited)
- Cherchez l'erreur (1980) - Le gardien du centre nucléaire
- Three Men to Kill (1980) - Le quidam à l'hôpital (uncredited)
- Pour la peau d'un flic (1981) - Le type au flipper (uncredited)
- Litan (1982) - Un infirmier
- Pour cent briques t'as plus rien (1982)
- Les Misérables (1982) - Le serveur à Saint-Cloud
- Plus beau que moi, tu meurs (1982) - Le sheikh
- Le marginal (1963)
- À mort l'arbitre (1984) - Voisin du 16e étage (scenes deleted)
- My New Partner (1984) - Ben Burger
- La vengeance du serpent à plumes (1984) - Un policier à l'aéroport
- Chicken with Vinegar (1985) - L'employé de la morgue
- Masks (1987) - Le surveillant
- Le Solitaire (1987) - Le greffier de la prison
- The Cry of the Owl (1987) - Cop #1
- Story of Women (1988) - Un policier au procès
- Quiet Days in Clichy (1990)
- L'Autrichienne (1990)
- Madame Bovary (1991) - Maltre Hareng
- La Totale! (1991) - Le concierge de l'hôtel
- Betty (1992)
- Ville à vendre (1992) - Un citoyen de Moussin
- Stranger in the House (1992) - Un policier au tribunal
- Bonsoir (1994) - Le chasseur
- Alliance cherche doigt (1997) - L'ivrogne
- The Swindle (1997) - Greek Vendor
- Robin des mers (1998) - Chômeur délateur
- Vidange (1998) - Dantin, le brocanteur
- Tout est calme (2000) - Member of the community
- La candide madame Duff (2000)
- Le glandeur (2000)
- Safe Conduct (2002) - Raoul
- The Flower of Evil (2003) - Fanny's Father-in-law
- Le Furet (2003) - Le sbire de Don Salvadore (final film role)
