= 21st César Awards =

1996 French film awards ceremony

- Date: 3 February 1996
- Site: Théâtre des Champs-Élysées, Paris, France
- Hosted by: Antoine de Caunes

Highlights
- Best Film: La Haine
- Best Actor: Michel Serrault
- Best Actress: Isabelle Huppert

Television coverage
- Network: Canal+

The 21st César Awards ceremony, presented by the Académie des Arts et Techniques du Cinéma, honoured the best French films of 1995 and took place on 3 February 1996 at the Théâtre des Champs-Élysées in Paris. The ceremony was chaired by Philippe Noiret and hosted by Antoine de Caunes. La Haine won the award for Best Film.

== Winners and nominees ==
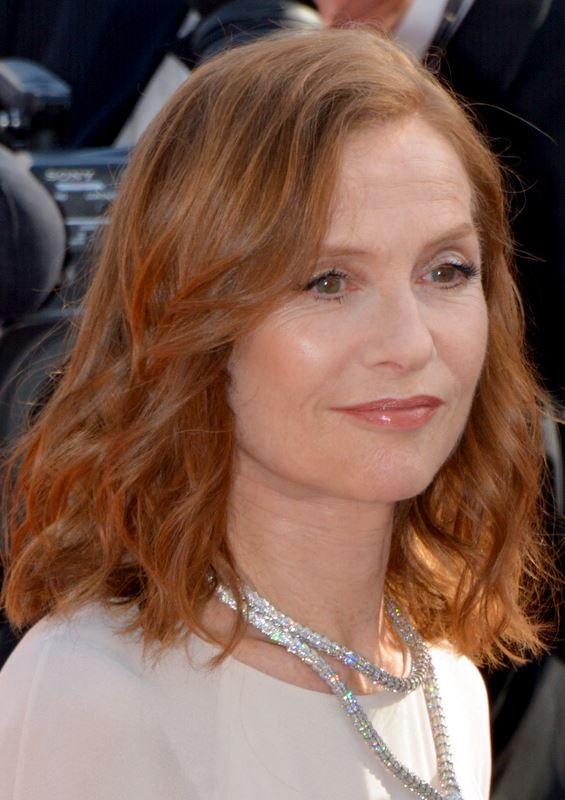
Isabelle Huppert, Best Actress winner

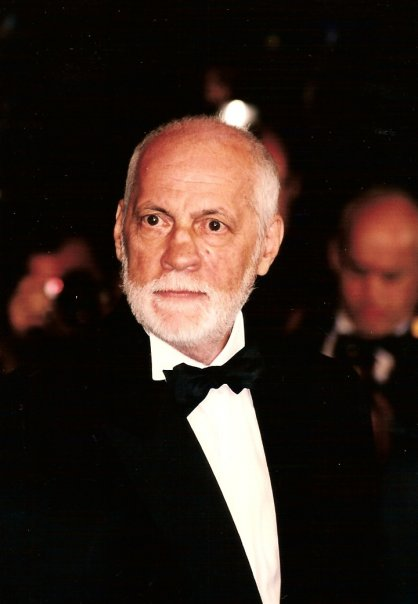
Michel Serrault, Best Actor winner

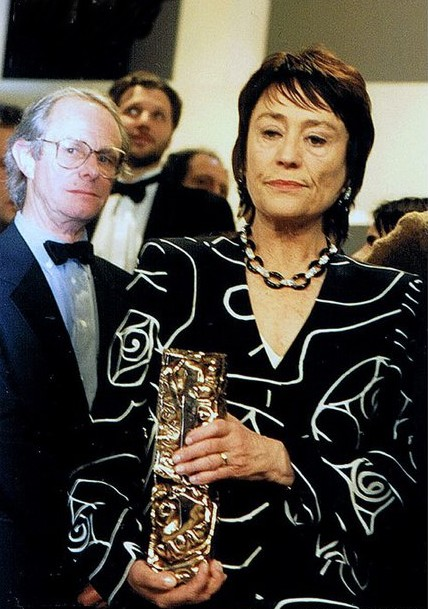
Annie Girardot, Best Supporting Actress winner

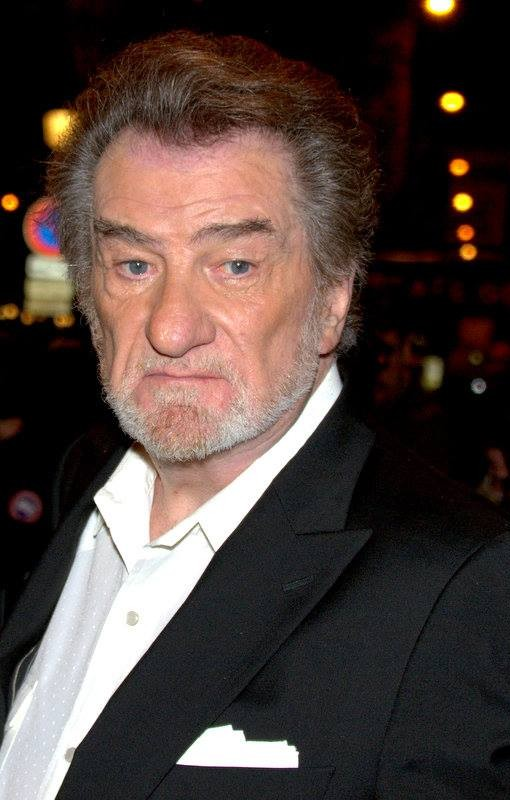
Eddy Mitchell, Best Supporting Actor winner

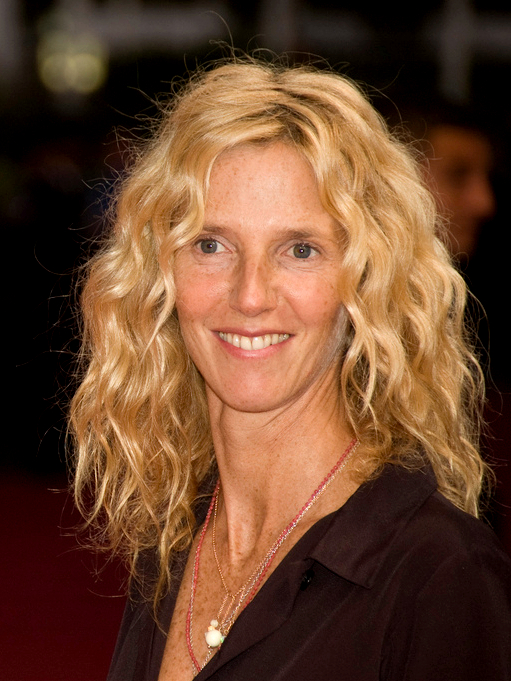
Sandrine Kiberlain, Most Promising Actress winner

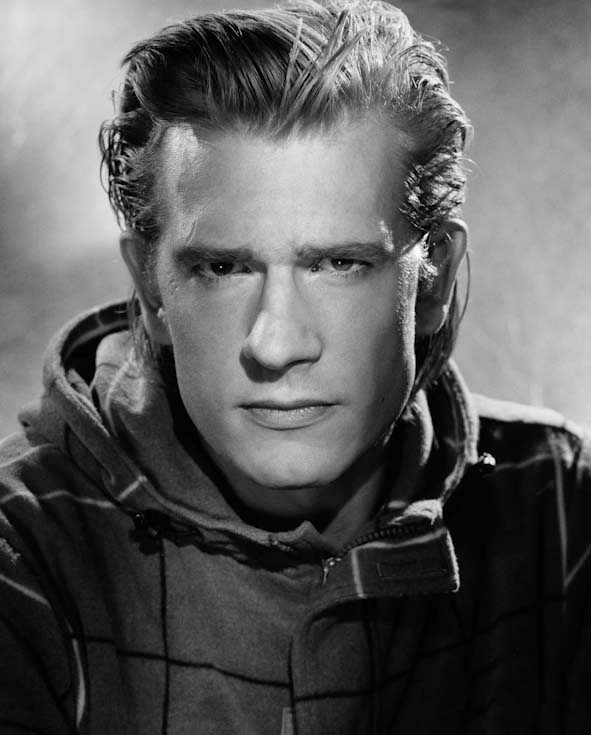
Guillaume Depardieu, Most Promising Actor winner

Best Film La Haine: Happiness Is in the Field; La Cérémonie; French Twist; The Horseman on the Roof; Nelly and Mr. Arnaud	Best Director Claude Sautet – Nelly and Mr. Arnaud: Étienne Chatiliez – Happiness Is in the Field; Claude Chabrol – La Cérémonie; Josiane Balasko – French Twist; Mathieu Kassovitz – La Haine; Jean-Paul Rappeneau – The Horseman on the Roof
Best Actor Michel Serrault – Nelly and Mr. Arnaud: François Cluzet – The Apprentices; Jean-Louis Trintignant – Fiesta; Alain Chabat – French Twist; Vincent Cassel – La Haine	Best Actress Isabelle Huppert – La Cérémonie: Sabine Azéma – Happiness Is in the Field; Sandrine Bonnaire – La Cérémonie; Juliette Binoche – The Horseman on the Roof; Emmanuelle Béart – Nelly and Mr. Arnaud
Best Supporting Actor Eddy Mitchell – Happiness Is in the Field: Jean-Pierre Cassel – La Cérémonie; Ticky Holgado – French Twist; Jean-Hugues Anglade – Nelly and Mr. Arnaud; Michael Lonsdale – Nelly and Mr. Arnaud	Best Supporting Actress Annie Girardot – Les Misérables: Carmen Maura – Happiness Is in the Field; Jacqueline Bisset – La Cérémonie; Claire Nadeau – Nelly and Mr. Arnaud; Clotilde Courau – Élisa
Most Promising Actor Guillaume Depardieu – The Apprentices: Olivier Sitruk – The Bait; Vincent Cassel – La Haine; Hubert Koundé – La Haine; Saïd Taghmaoui – La Haine	Most Promising Actress Sandrine Kiberlain – To Have (or Not): Marie Gillain – The Bait; Virginie Ledoyen – A Single Girl; Isabelle Carré – The Horseman on the Roof; Clotilde Courau – Élisa
Best Original Screenplay or Adaptation French Twist – Telsche Boorman and Josiane Balasko: Happiness Is in the Field – Florence Quentin; La Cérémonie – Caroline Eliacheff and Claude Chabrol; La Haine – Mathieu Kassovitz; Nelly and Mr. Arnaud – Jacques Fieschi and Claude Sautet	Best First Feature Film The Three Brothers: To Have (or Not); Pigalle; Rosine; Inner City
Best Cinematography Thierry Arbogast – The Horseman on the Roof: Darius Khondji – The City of Lost Children; Pierre Aïm – La Haine	Best Editing Mathieu Kassovitz and Scott Stevenson – La Haine: Noëlle Boisson – The Horseman on the Roof; Jacqueline Thiédot – Nelly and Mr. Arnaud
Best Sound Pierre Gamet, Jean Goudier and Dominique Hennequin – The Horseman on the Roof: Dominique Dalmasso and Vincent Tulli – La Haine; Pierre Lenoir and Jean-Paul Loublier – Nelly and Mr. Arnaud	Best Original Music Zbigniew Preisner, Serge Gainsbourg and Michel Colombier – Élisa: Angelo Badalamenti – The City of Lost Children; Jean-Claude Petit – The Horseman on the Roof; Philippe Sarde – Nelly and Mr. Arnaud
Best Costume Design Christian Gasc – Madame Butterfly: Jean-Paul Gaultier – The City of Lost Children; Franca Squarciapino – The Horseman on the Roof	Best Production Design Jean Rabasse – The City of Lost Children: Jacques Rouxel, Ezio Frigerio and Christian Marti – The Horseman on the Roof; Michèle Abbé-Vannier – Madame Butterfly
Best Short Film The Monk and the Fish: Le Bus; Roland; Corps inflammables	Best Foreign Film Land and Freedom: The Bridges of Madison County; Smoke; Underground; The Usual Suspects
Best Producer Christophe Rossignon: Claude Berri; René Cleitman; Charles Gassot; Alain Terzian
Honorary César Lauren Bacall; Henri Verneuil

== See also ==
- 68th Academy Awards
- 49th British Academy Film Awards
- 8th European Film Awards
- 1st Lumière Awards
