= Les Dragueurs =

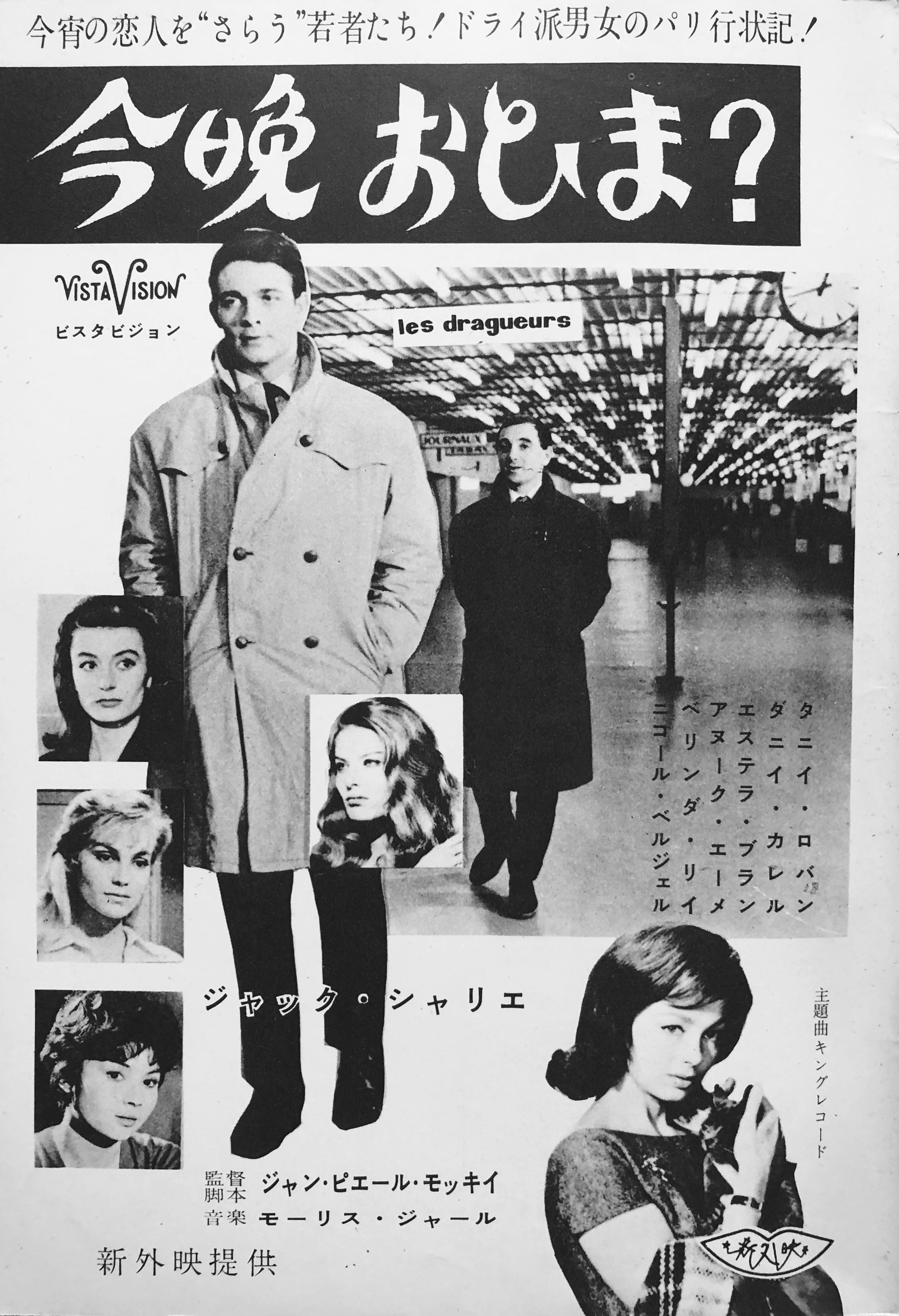
- Directed by: Jean-Pierre Mocky
- Written by: Jean-Pierre Mocky; Jean-Charles Pichon; Louis Sapin
- Starring: Jacques Charrier; Charles Aznavour
- Cinematography: Edmond Sechan
- Production company: Lisbon Films
- Distributed by: Fernand Rivers
- Release dates: 29 April 1959; (France); May 1960 (US)
- Running time: 78 minutes
- Country: France
- Language: French

Les Dragueurs is a 1959 French drama film directed by Jean-Pierre Mocky. British actor Belinda Lee plays a role.

It is also known as The Chasers (US title), The Girl Hunters, or The Young Have No Morals.

== Premise ==
Two young men, Freddy and Joseph, go out looking for girls one night, hoping to find the right girl. They go through a number of different experiences and encounters. Among the women they meet: Denise, who is married, but looking for romance; Sylviane, who clings to old dreams and boyfriends; Dadou, Sylviane's harsh roommate; Ghislaine; a disillusioned hard partier; a bobby soxer; Jeanne, a cripple.

== Cast ==
- Jacques Charrier as Freddy
- Charles Aznavour as Joseph Bouvier
- Dany Robin as Denise
- Dany Carrel as Dadou
- Estella Blain as Sylviane
- Anouk Aimée as Jeanne
- Belinda Lee as Ghislaine
- Nicole Berger as Françoise
- Véronique Nordey as La bobby-soxer
- Ingeborg Schöner as Monica
- Margit Saad as Ingrid
- Gérard Darrieu as Un ami de Freddy

== Production ==
It was one of a series of sexually aggressive characters Belinda Lee played in European movies.

== Reception ==
Variety said the director "has filled this with some fairly acute observation on pickups and Paris nightlife, with a wild party also thrown in. It is sometimes sketchy and one-track but has exploitation handles on its looksee of Paris at night." The reviewer added that he felt the two leads "give body to the roles of the two searchers. The women remain facets of the female psyche. However, they are all lookers and dress up the pic. Technical credits and production values are fine, with on-the-spot lensing a help. This is an offbeater with possibilities for offshore specialized programs.

The film was released in New York in 1960 as The Chasers. The New York Times called it "a bittersweet, faintly tragic and sardonic romantic drama. However, as inventive, striking fare it is, basically, just another ripple in the veritable inundation of 'new wave' of features turned out by France's youthful filmmakers."

The Monthly Film Bulletin said it "had its points of interest."

It was released in LA in 1963 as The Girl Chasers.
