= The Miracle (1987 film) =

1987 film

- Film poster
- Directed by: Jean-Pierre Mocky
- Written by: Patrick Granier; Jean-Claude Romer; Jean-Pierre Mocky
- Produced by: Jean-Pierre Mocky
- Starring: Michel Serrault
- Cinematography: Marcel Combes
- Edited by: Jean-Pierre Mocky
- Music by: Jorge Arriagada; Michael Nyman
- Distributed by: Cannon Films
- Release date: 18 February 1987
- Running time: 88 minutes
- Country: France
- Language: French

The Miracle (French: Le Miraculé) is a 1987 French comedy film directed by Jean-Pierre Mocky. It was entered into the 37th Berlin International Film Festival.

== Cast ==
- Michel Serrault as Ronald Fox Terrier
- Jean Poiret as Papu
- Jeanne Moreau as Sabine, dite 'La Major'
- Sylvie Joly as Mrs. Fox Terrier
- Jean Rougerie as Monseigneur
- Roland Blanche as Plombie
- Sophie Moyse as Angelica
- Marc Maury as L'abbé Humus / Father Humus
- Hervé Pauchon as Joulin
- Georges Lucas as Le miraculé Dulac
- Jean Abeillé as Victor
- Dominique Zardi as Rondolo
