= Un linceul n'a pas de poches =

- Theatrical release poster
- Directed by: Jean-Pierre Mocky
- Screenplay by: Jean-Pierre Mocky; Alain Moury
- Based on: the novel by Horace McCoy No pockets in a shroud
- Starring: Jean-Pierre Mocky; Myriam Mézières; Jean-Pierre Marielle; Jean Carmet
- Cinematography: Marcel Weiss
- Edited by: Marie-Louise Barberot
- Music by: Paul de Senneville; Olivier Toussaint
- Distributed by: SN Prodis
- Release date: 1974
- Running time: 125 minutes
- Country: France
- Language: French

Un linceul n'a pas de poches (English: No Pockets in a Shroud) is a French film directed by Jean-Pierre Mocky in 1974.

== Plot ==
A journalist, Michel Dolannes, decides to use his newspaper to denounce the corruption of the established system. One day, he discovers a number of scandals before being shot for attacking the mayor of the town.

== Technical details ==
- Director : Jean-Pierre Mocky
- Screenplay : After the novel by Horace McCoy No pockets in a shroud
- Adapted : Jean-Pierre Mocky, Alain Moury
- Script : Alain Moury
- Assistant director : Luc Andrieux, Eric Ferro
- Photographer : Marcel Weiss
- Camera : Paul Rodier, assisted by Christian Dupré
- Sound : Séverin Frankiel, assisted by Bernard Le Du
- Orchestration : Hervé Roy
- Editing : Marie-Louise Barberot, assisted by Michel Saintourens
- Scenery : René Loubet
- Costumes : Sylvie Jouffa - Claude Gilbert, for clothes - and Jocelyn, for shoes
- M. Mézières is dressed by Gudule and Dixieland Boutique, M. Mocky and S. Kristel are dressed by Sarah Shelburne and Delya Boutique, M. Sarcey is dressed by Pierre Balmain
- Make-up : Louis Dor
- Fight co-ordinator: Claude Carliez
- Waterfalls : Michel Norman
- Script-girl : Suzanne Ohanessian
- Runner : Catherine Lapoujade
- Landscape photography : Pierre Raffo
- Production : Balzac Films, S.N Prodis
- Production director : Robert Paillardon
- Distribution : S.N Prodis
- Filmed from 25 March 1974, External: Paris, the Paris region, Rouen
- 35mm film, colour
- Length : 125mn
- Genre : Drama
- Premiere: 11/10/1974
- Visa d'exploitation : 42606

== Starring ==
- Jean-Pierre Mocky: Michel Dolannes, journaliste
- Myriam Mézières: Mira Barnowski
- Jean-Pierre Marielle: Le docteur Carlille
- Jean Carmet: Le commissaire Bude
- Michel Constantin: Culli
- Michel Serrault: Justin Blesh
- Marisa Muxen/Mocky: Liliane Blesh
- Sylvia Kristel: Avril
- Paul Müller: Minecci
- Christian Duvaleix: Jo
- Michel Galabru: Thomas
- Daniel Gélin: Laurence
- Francis Blanche: Nathaël Grissom "F. Blanche décédé avant la post-synchronisation, fut doublé par Roger Carel qui imita sa voix"
- Martine Sarcey: Mme Mardène
- Michael Lonsdale: Raymond
- Pierre Gualdi: Ferdinand Blesh
- Samson Fainsilber: Gonzague
- Robert Berri: Le militant communiste
- Jess Hahn: Walter
- Jacques Duby: Eckmann
- Alain Adair: David
- Guy Denancy: Bernard
- Carl Studer: Raff
- Katia Romanoff: L'infirmière
- Gérard Hoffmann: Un homme de main
- Dominique Zardi: Un homme de main
- Betty Beckers: Mme Carlille
- Liza Braconnier: Mme Culli
- Jean-Claude Rémoleux: Le metteur en scène
- Georges Lucas: L'acteur maquillé
- Rudy Lenoir: Un journaliste
- Agostino Vasco: Doudou
- Percival Russel: Le boxeur
- Jean Cherlian: Un gros bras
- Louis Albanèse: Un gros bras
- Jean Abeillé: L'employé aux tables d'écoutes et l'huissier Raymond
- Luc Andrieux: Le tueur à la mitraillette
- Georges Bouvier: Un typographe
- Pierre Raffo: Un inspecteur
- Jean-Claude Romer: Un lecteur du "Cosmopolite"
- Lisa Livane: Anne-Marie Minecci
- Aline Alba
- Roxane de Montaignac
- Blanche Rayne
- Laurence Vincendon

== Reception ==
It was released in France in 1975 and recorded admissions of 249,022. The music was nominated for a César Award.
