= Litan (disambiguation) =

Litan may refer to:

== People ==
- Litan, 10th century Irish abbot

== Religion ==
- Lotan, servant of sea god Yam in Canaanite religion

== Places ==
- Litan, Manipur, village in Ukhrul district of Manipur, India
- Litan, Chandel district, village in Chandel district of Manipur, India

== Arts ==
- Litan (film), 1982 French horror film
