= André Djaoui =

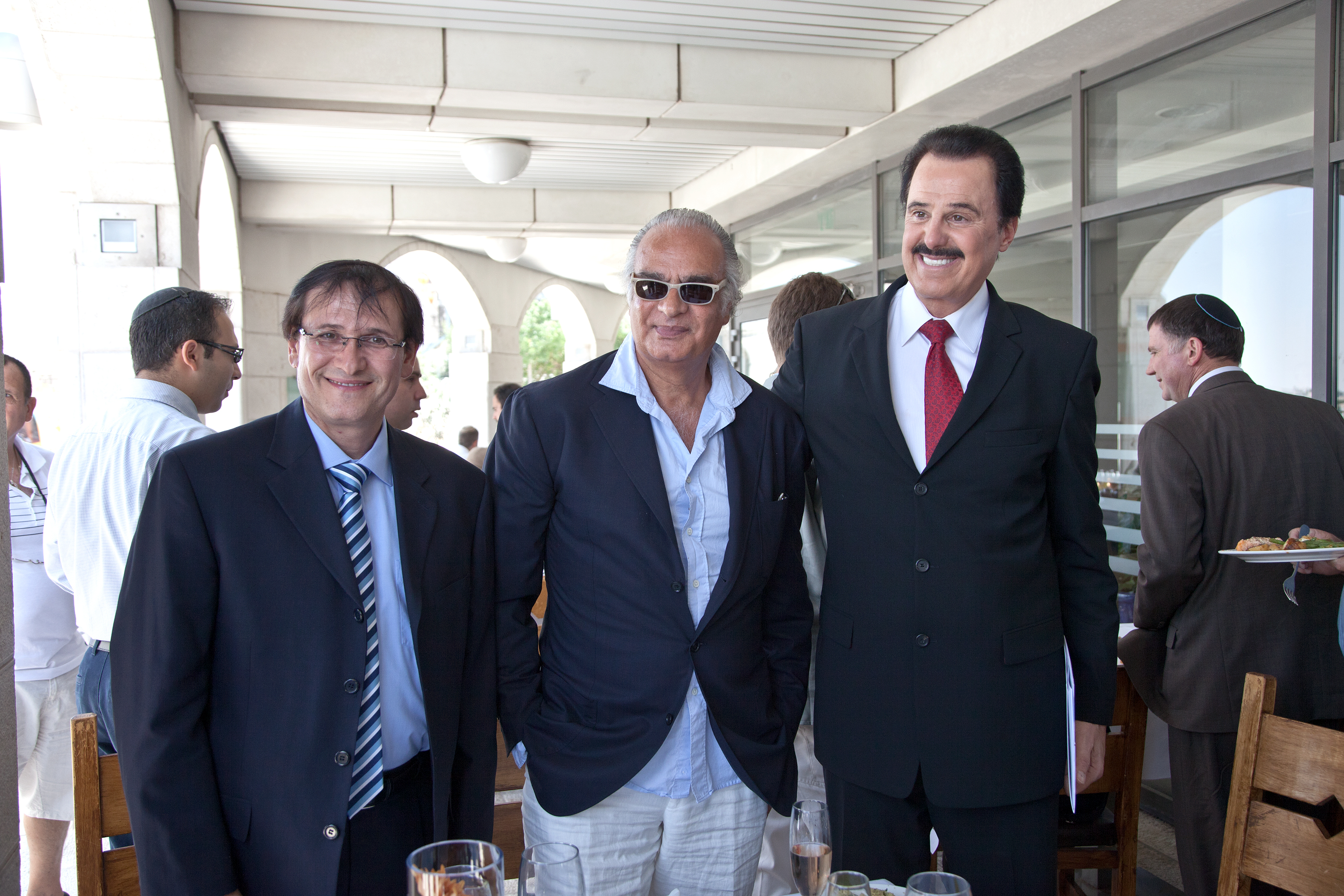
- Andre' Djaoui (in middle), with Michael D. Evans (right) and Benjamin Philip (in 2011) at Menachem Begin Heritage Museum in Jerusalem
- Citizenship: Tunisia
- Occupations: Film and stage producer, film director, screenplay writer, painter

André Djaoui is a Tunisian-born producer of film and stage, film director, screenplay writer, and painter. He was born in Tunis, Tunisia.

== Filmography ==
- 1981: L'Amant de Lady Chatterley de Just Jaeckin
- 1983: Au nom de tous les miens de Robert Enrico
- 1985: Liberté, égalité, choucroute de Jean Yanne
- 1986: La famille d'Ettore Scola
- 1986: Pourvu que ce soit une fille de Mario Monicelli
- 1987: Trois sœurs de Margarethe von Trotta
- 1988: Une nuit à l'Assemblée Nationale de Jean-Pierre Mocky
- 1990: Les 1001 nuits de Philippe de Broca
- 1990: La voce della luna de Federico Fellini
- 2005: Ô Jérusalem de Élie Chouraqui

== Audiovisual works ==
In 1992, Djaoui co-produced with Antenne 2, Rai 2, RTVE, NHK Japan, Channel 4 UK, USA Warner video, a series of seven portraits of scientists, writers, artists, politicians, and philosophers who changed the world. These films were made for television by leading filmmakers: Kafka by Zbigniew Rybczyński, Darwin by Peter Greenaway, Vivaldi by Lina Wertmüller, Ben Gurion by Jerry Schatzberg, Einstein by Michael Ritchie, Chekhov by Nikita Mikhalkov and Gershwin by Alain Resnais.

== Musical comedy ==
In 1994, Djaoui produced King David, a Broadway musical (lyrics by Tim Rice and music by Alan Menken). This is a work inspired by the Bible, especially the books of Samuel, the Book of Chronicles and the Book of Psalms. King David was designed as part of the celebration of the 3000 years of the foundation of Jerusalem.

== Theater ==
Djaoui also writes for the theater. After meeting Philippe Grimbert, they wrote a play named Back.

== Painting ==
In 2008, he decided to start a new life in Israel as an artist. His paintings were exhibited in Tel-Aviv in 2009. His artworks are also present in Miami since 2015.
