= Jean-Pierre Mocky =

French film director (1929–2019)

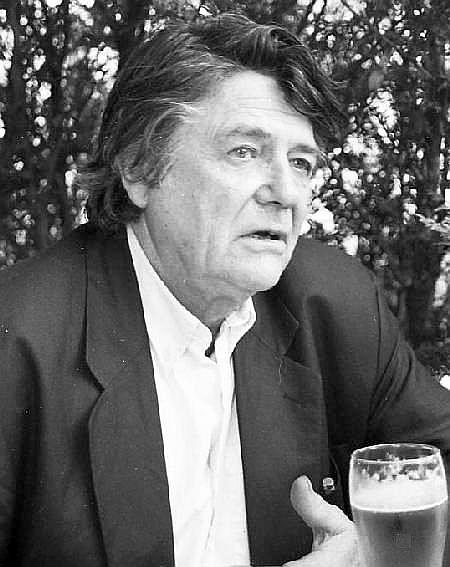
- Mocky at the "Sous les Projecteurs" festival in 1995
- Born: Jean-Paul Adam Mokiejewski; 6 July 1929; Nice, France
- Died: 8 August 2019 (aged 90); Paris, France
- Occupations: Director, actor, screenwriter, producer
- Years active: 1955–2019
- Spouse(s): Monique Baudin (1946); Véronique Nordey (divorced)
- Children: 1

Jean-Pierre Mocky (6 July 1929 – 8 August 2019), pseudonym of Jean-Paul Adam Mokiejewski, was a French film director, actor, screenwriter and producer.

== Early life and education ==
Mocky was born on 6 July 1929 in Nice, France, to Polish immigrant parents, Jeanne Zylinska and Adam Mokiejewski. His father was Jewish and his mother was Catholic.

== Career ==
Mocky appeared as an actor in the 1955 film Gli Sbandati and in many other movies, including some of those he also directed (Solo, L'albatros, L'Ombre d'une chance, Un Linceul n'a pas de poches). His 1987 film Le Miraculé was entered into the 37th Berlin International Film Festival.

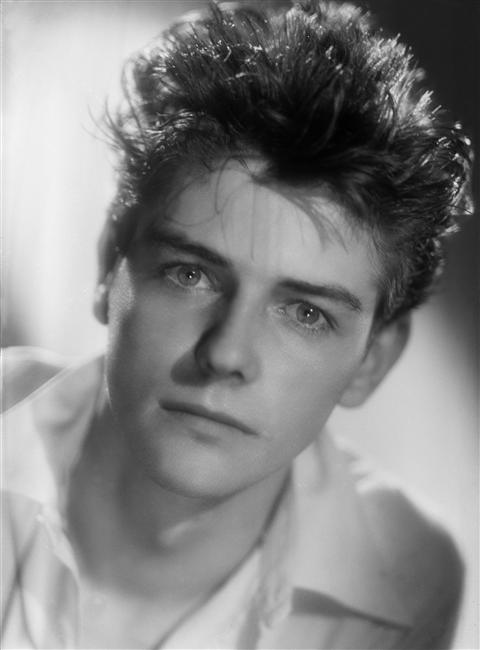
Mocky in 1948

He began as an actor in the cinema and theater. In particular, he played in Jean Dréville's Les Casse-pieds (1948), Jean Cocteau's Orphée (1950) and Bernard Borderie's The Mask of the Gorilla (1957). But it was especially in Italy that he became famous, thanks to his role in I vinti by Michelangelo Antonioni.

After working as an assistant with Luchino Visconti on Senso (1954) and Federico Fellini on La strada (1954), he wrote his first film, La Tête contre les murs (1959) and planned to direct it himself, but the producer preferred to entrust the task to Georges Franju. He went on to direct the following year with Les Dragueurs (1959).

As early as the 1960s, he was able to reach a wide audience with crazy comedies such as A Funny Parishioner (1963) and La Grande Lessive (1968). After May 1968, he turned to darker films with Solo (1969), in which he shows a group of young anarchists, then L'Albatros (1971) which shows the corruption of politicians.

In the 1980s, he returned to success with a film denouncing, a year before the drama of Heysel, the excesses of some football fans (À mort l'arbitre, 1984) and a comedy denouncing the hypocrisy around the pilgrimage to Lourdes (Le Miraculé, 1987). In the 1990s and 2000s, his films met with less success, but Mocky continued to shoot with much enthusiasm.

In the beginning, his films were dedicated to the uprising against the restrictions imposed by society. Later, he concentrated on farce, as in Bonsoir where the homeless Alex (Michel Serrault) pretends to be the lover of the lesbian Caroline (Claude Jade) in order to save her inheritance from her homophobic relatives.

Mocky's cinema, often satirical, is generally inspired by the truth of society. He worked with few resources and filmed very quickly. He worked with Bourvil (A Funny Parishioner, The City of Unspeakable Fear, La Grande Lessive and The Stallion), Fernandel (The Exchange and Life), Michel Simon (The Red Ibis), Michel Serrault (twelve films including Le Miraculé), Francis Blanche (five films including The City of Unspeakable Fear), Jacqueline Maillan (five films), Jean Poiret (eight films) and with the stars Catherine Deneuve (Agent Trouble), Claude Jade (Bonsoir), Jane Birkin (Noir comme le souvenir), Jeanne Moreau (Le Miraculé) and Stéphane Audran (The Seasons of Pleasure).

== Awards and recognition ==
In 2010, he received the Prix Henri-Langlois for his entire career, and in 2013 was awarded the Alphonse Allais Prize.

The International Festival of Film Entrevues in Belfort in 2012 and the Cinémathèque française in 2014 dedicated full retrospectives to him.

Mocky was described as a "perpetual guest" of the Festival Polar de Cognac, and was given a Polar lifetime achievement award in 2015.

== Death ==
He died on 8 August 2019.

== Filmography (as director) ==
=== 1960s ===
- 1960 : Les Dragueurs starring Jacques Charrier, Charles Aznavour
- 1960 : Un couple starring Juliette Mayniel, Francis Blanche
- 1961 : Snobs ! starring Véronique Nordey, Francis Blanche
- 1962 : Les Vierges starring Charles Aznavour, Jean Poiret
- 1963 : Un drôle de paroissien starring Bourvil, Jean Poiret
- 1964 : La Grande Frousse / La Cité de l'Indicible Peur starring Bourvil, Francis Blanche
- 1966 : Your Money or Your Life starring Fernandel, Heinz Rühmann
- 1966 : Les Compagnons de la marguerite starring Claude Rich, Michel Serrault
- 1968 : La Grande Lessive starring Bourvil, Francis Blanche

=== 1970s ===
- 1970 : L'Étalon starring Bourvil, Francis Blanche
- 1970 : Solo starring Jean-Pierre Mocky, Anne Deleuze
- 1971 : Love Hate starring Jean-Pierre Mocky, Marion Game
- 1972 : Chut starring Jacques Dufilho, Michael Lonsdale
- 1973 : L'Ombre d'une chance starring Jean-Pierre Mocky, Robert Benoit
- 1974 : Un Linceul n'a pas de poches starring Jean-Pierre Mocky, Myriam Mézières
- 1975 : L'Ibis rouge starring Michel Serrault, Michel Simon
- 1976 : Le Roi des bricoleurs starring Sim, Michel Serrault
- 1978 : Le Témoin starring Alberto Sordi, Philippe Noiret
- 1979 : Le Piège à cons starring Jean-Pierre Mocky, Catherine Leprince

=== 1980s ===
- 1982 : Litan starring Jean-Pierre Mocky, Marie-José Nat
- 1982 : Y a-t-il un Français dans la salle ? starring Victor Lanoux, Jacques Dutronc
- 1983 : À mort l'arbitre starring Michel Serrault, Eddy Mitchell
- 1985 : Le Pactole starring Richard Bohringer, Patrick Sébastien
- 1986 : La Machine à découdre
- 1986 : Le Miraculé starring Michel Serrault, Jeanne Moreau
- 1987 : Agent trouble starring Catherine Deneuve, Richard Bohringer
- 1987 : Les Saisons du plaisir starring Charles Vanel, Denise Grey
- 1988 : Une nuit à l'Assemblée Nationale starring Michel Blanc, Jacqueline Maillan
- 1988 : Nice is Nice (short movie)
- 1988 : Méliès 88
- 1988 : Divine enfant starring Laura Martel, Jean-Pierre Mocky

=== 1990s ===
- 1990 : Il gèle en enfer starring Jean-Pierre Mocky, Laura Grandt
- 1991 : La Méthode Barnol (short movie)
- 1991 : La vérité qui tue (short movie)
- 1991 : Dis-moi qui tu hais (short movie)
- 1991 : Ville à vendre starring Tom Novembre, Michel Serrault
- 1992 : Le Mari de Léon
- 1992 : Bonsoir starring Michel Serrault, Claude Jade
- 1995 : Noir comme le souvenir (Black for Remembrance) with Jane Birkin, Sabine Azema, Mattias Habich
- 1997 : Robin des mers
- 1997 : Alliance cherche doigt
- 1998 : Vidange
- 1999 : Tout est calme
- 1999 : La candide madame Duff

=== 2000s ===
- 2000 : Le Glandeur
- 2001 : La Bête de miséricorde
- 2002 : Les Araignées de la nuit
- 2003 : Le Furet starring Michel Serrault, Jacques Villeret
- 2004 : Touristes, oh yes !
- 2004 : Les Ballets écarlates
- 2005 : Grabuge! starring Michel Serrault, Charles Berling
- 2006 : Le Deal
- 2007 : Le Bénévole starring Michel Serrault, Jean-Claude Dreyfus
- 2007 : 13 French Street
- 2007 : Le Diable en embuscade (short movie)

=== 2010s ===
- 2011 : Crédit pour tous
- 2011 : Les Insomniaques
- 2011 : Le dossier Toroto
- 2013 : Le Mentor
- 2012 : À votre bon cœur, mesdames
- 2013 : Dors mon lapin
- 2013 : Le Renard jaune
- 2014 : Le Mystère des jonquilles
- 2014 : Calomnies
- 2015 : Tu es si jolie ce soir
- 2015 : Les Compagnons de la pomponette
- 2015 : Monsieur Cauchemar
- 2016 : Le Cabanon rose
- 2016 : Rouges étaient les lilas
- 2017 : Vénéneuses
- 2017 : Votez pour moi
- 2019 : Tous flics !

== Filmography (as actor) ==
- The Eternal Husband (1946)
- God Needs Men (1950)
- Wedding Night (1950)
- I vinti (1953)
- Stain in the Snow (1954)
- The Big Flag (1954)
- Le Comte de Monte-Cristo (1954)
- Gli Sbandati (1955)
- Le rouge est mis (1957)
- La Tête contre les murs (1959)
- Solo (1970)
- À mort l'arbitre! (1984)
- Vidange (1998)
- Americano (2011)

== Bibliography ==
- Prédal, René (1988). Jean-Pierre Mocky. Lherminier/Quatre-Vents.
- Haustrate, Gaston (1989). Entretiens avec Jean-Pierre Mocky. Édilig.
- Le Roy, Éric (2000). Jean-Pierre Mocky. Ciné-regards. Bibliothèque du film/Durante.
