= Luc Andrieux =

French actor and assistant director

- Born: 17 February 1917; Agon-Coutainville, France
- Died: 26 November 1977 (aged 60); Paris, France
- Occupations: Actor, assistant director
- Years active: 1950–1974

Luc Andrieux (1917–1977) was a French actor and assistant director.

== Partial filmography ==
- The Queen's Necklace (1946) - Un geôlier (uncredited)
- Le Bataillon du ciel (1947)
- Les aventures des pieds nickeles (1948) - Hector
- The Cupboard Was Bare (1948) - Le troisième habitué
- Five Red Tulips (1949) - Charles Brugeat
- Le trésor des Pieds-Nickelés (1950) - Hector
- The Girl from Maxim's (1950) - Etienne
- Uniformes et grandes manoeuvres (1950) - Le Parachutiste
- Street Without a King (1950) - Le cambrioleur (uncredited)
- La grande vie (1951) - Le voleur
- The Crime of Bouif (1952) - Le premier policier
- Three Women (1952) - Un employé
- Bille de clown (1952)
- The Respectful Prostitute (1952) - Le barman
- My Priest Among the Rich (1952) - Brochut
- A Hundred Francs a Second (1952) - Le mauvais garçon (uncredited)
- Quitte ou double (1952)
- The Last Robin Hood (1953) - Un complice
- Follow That Man (1953) - Le régisseur du studio de cinéma (uncredited)
- Le gang des pianos à bretelles (1953)
- Le Chevalier de la nuit (1953) - Le cocher
- This Man Is Dangerous (1953) - Maurice
- Les révoltés de Lomanach (1954) - Un soldat qui veut dormir (uncredited)
- Service Entrance (1954) - Le serrurier
- Le fil à la patte (1954) - Le serrurier (uncredited)
- The Infiltrator (1955) - Max (uncredited)
- Pas de coup dur pour Johnny (1955)
- Les évadés (1955) - Un prisonnier
- Papa, maman, ma femme et moi (1955) - Le déménageur (uncredited)
- Eighteen Hour Stopover (1955) - Le barman
- Cherchez la femme (1955)
- The Hotshot (1955) - Willy
- Four Days in Paris (1955) - Le gendarme
- La Madelon (1955) - Un adjudant (uncredited)
- Une fille épatante (1955) - Le barman
- Ce soir les jupons volent... (1956) - Legris le fils de la bouchère
- Miss Catastrophe (1957)
- A Friend of the Family (1957)
- Comme un cheveu sur la soupe (1957) - L'éclusier (uncredited)
- Les Misérables (1958) - Henri - un ouvrier insurgé
- Head Against the Wall (1959) - Un infirmier
- The 400 Blows (1959) - Le professeur de gym
- Un couple (1960) - (uncredited)
- Le caïd (1960) - Un agent de stationnement (uncredited)
- Snobs! (1962) - Le gendarme sur l'échelle (uncredited)
- La salamandre d'or (1962) - Un convoyeur d'or (uncredited)
- Heaven Sent (1963) - Un clochard au landeau (uncredited)
- Les compagnons de la marguerite (1967) - Le technicien (uncredited)
- Mise à sac (1967) - L'agent Albert
- La grande lessive! (1968) - Le chauffeur du fourgon de police (uncredited)
- L'étalon (1970) - Brig. Zorba
- Solo (1970) - Le pompiste (uncredited)
- L'Albatros (1971) - Un gendarme
- No Pockets in a Shroud (1974) - Le tueur à la mitraillette (uncredited) (final film role)
