= Girl on the Road =

- Directed by: Jacqueline Audry
- Written by: Stella Kersová; Pierre Laroche; Pierre Pelegri
- Produced by: Eugène Tucherer
- Starring: Darry Cowl; Pierre Mondy; Lino Ventura
- Cinematography: Robert Lefebvre
- Edited by: Suzanne de Troeye
- Music by: Georges Van Parys
- Production companies: Les Films Metzger; Paris Elysées Films
- Distributed by: Gaumont
- Release date: 16 March 1962
- Running time: 95 minutes
- Country: France
- Language: French

Girl on the Road or Hitch-Hike (French: Les petits matins) is a 1962 French comedy film directed by Jacqueline Audry and starring Darry Cowl, Pierre Mondy, and Lino Ventura.

== Cast ==
- Darry Cowl as Le journaliste
- Pierre Mondy as Le manager
- Lino Ventura as Le conducteur de car
- Daniel Gélin as Le comédien
- Robert Hossein as Le fou
- Arletty as Gabrielle, maîtresse de Rameau
- Pierre Brasseur as Achille Pipermint
- Andréa Parisy as Une autostoppeuse
- Fernand Gravey as L'homme à la cadillac
- Claude Rich as L'homme de 30 ans
- François Périer as L'homme de 40 ans
- Agathe Aëms as Agathe
- Gilbert Bécaud as Le pilote d'air france
- Noël-Noël as Le baron
- Bernard Blier as Rameau
- Michel Le Royer as Le champion de tennis
- Jean-Claude Brialy as Jean-Claude, le marchand de brosses
- Francis Blanche as Le douanier
- Joé Davray as Le motard #1
- Philippe Clair as Le motard #2
- Roger Coggio as Bobby, le boxeur
- Huguette Duflos as La mère d'Édouard
- Yves Gabrielli as Le camionneur
- Jean Parédès as Le maître d'hôtel
- Christian Pezey as Le scootériste
- Pierre Repp as Le satyre
- Véra Valmont as La barmaid
- Henri Attal as Un spectateur à la boxe
- Maurice Auzel as Un boxeur
- Michèle Bardollet as La serveuse
- Claude Caroll as La serveuse au restauroute
- Dominique Zardi as Un spectateur à la boxe

== Bibliography ==
- Sharon Smith. Women who Make Movies. Hopkinson and Blake, 1975.
