= Your Money or Your Life (1966 film) =

1966 film

- Directed by: Jean-Pierre Mocky
- Written by: Jean-Pierre Mocky; Fernand Marzelle; Alain Moury; Marcel Aymé
- Produced by: Claude Ganz; Jean-Pierre Mocky
- Starring: Fernandel; Heinz Rühmann; Jean Poiret
- Cinematography: Jean Tournier
- Edited by: Janette Kronegger; Gabriel Rongier
- Music by: Bernard Kesslair
- Production companies: Orsay Films; Balzac Films; Vides Cinematografica; Société d'Expansion du Spectacle; Bavaria Film
- Distributed by: Columbia Pictures
- Release date: 27 April 1966
- Running time: 90 minutes
- Countries: France; Italy; West Germany
- Language: French

Your Money or Your Life (French: La bourse et la vie) is a 1966 comedy film directed by Jean-Pierre Mocky and starring Fernandel, Heinz Rühmann and Jean Poiret. It was made as a co-production between France, Italy and West Germany. It is a loose remake of the 1931 German film The Virtuous Sinner in which Rühmann had also appeared.

It was shot at the Billancourt Studios in Paris and the Bavaria Studios in Munich. Location shooting also took place across France including Toulouse.

== Partial cast ==
- Fernandel as Charles Migue
- Heinz Rühmann as Henry Schmidt
- Jean Poiret as Lucien Pélépan
- Marilù Tolo as Violette
- Jean Carmet as Le curé
- André Gabriello as Pierre Robinhoude
- Jacques Legras as Tapu
- Claude Piéplu as Un surveillant de l'agence de Paris
- Darry Cowl as Marquy
- Michel Galabru as Maître Laprise
- Simone Duhart as Madame le P.-d.g.
- Andrex as Le chef de convoi
- Krista Nell as Geneviève
- Roger Legris as Dumoulin, le pharmacien
- Colette Teissèdre as Ursula
- Henri Poirier as Un parieur
- Claude Mansard as Un parieur
- Marcel Pérès as Le gardien de l'agence de Toulouse
- Raymond Jourdan as Un parieur
- Maryse Martin as La femme à la valise
- Michael Lonsdale as Le conférencier au club des timides
- Pierre Gualdi as Jean Ronbinhoude
- Rudy Lenoir as Un surveillant de l'agence de Paris
- Jean-Claude Rémoleux as Paul Robinhoude / Un chauffeur de camion
- Léonce Corne as Un employé de la SNCF
- Françoise Arnaud as Une timide
- Gilbert Robin as Un voyageur
- Dominique Zardi as Un convoyeur
- Henri Attal as Le voyageur au chat

== Bibliography ==
- James Monaco. The Encyclopedia of Film. Perigee Books, 1991.
