= Jean Poiret =

French actor, director, and screenwriter

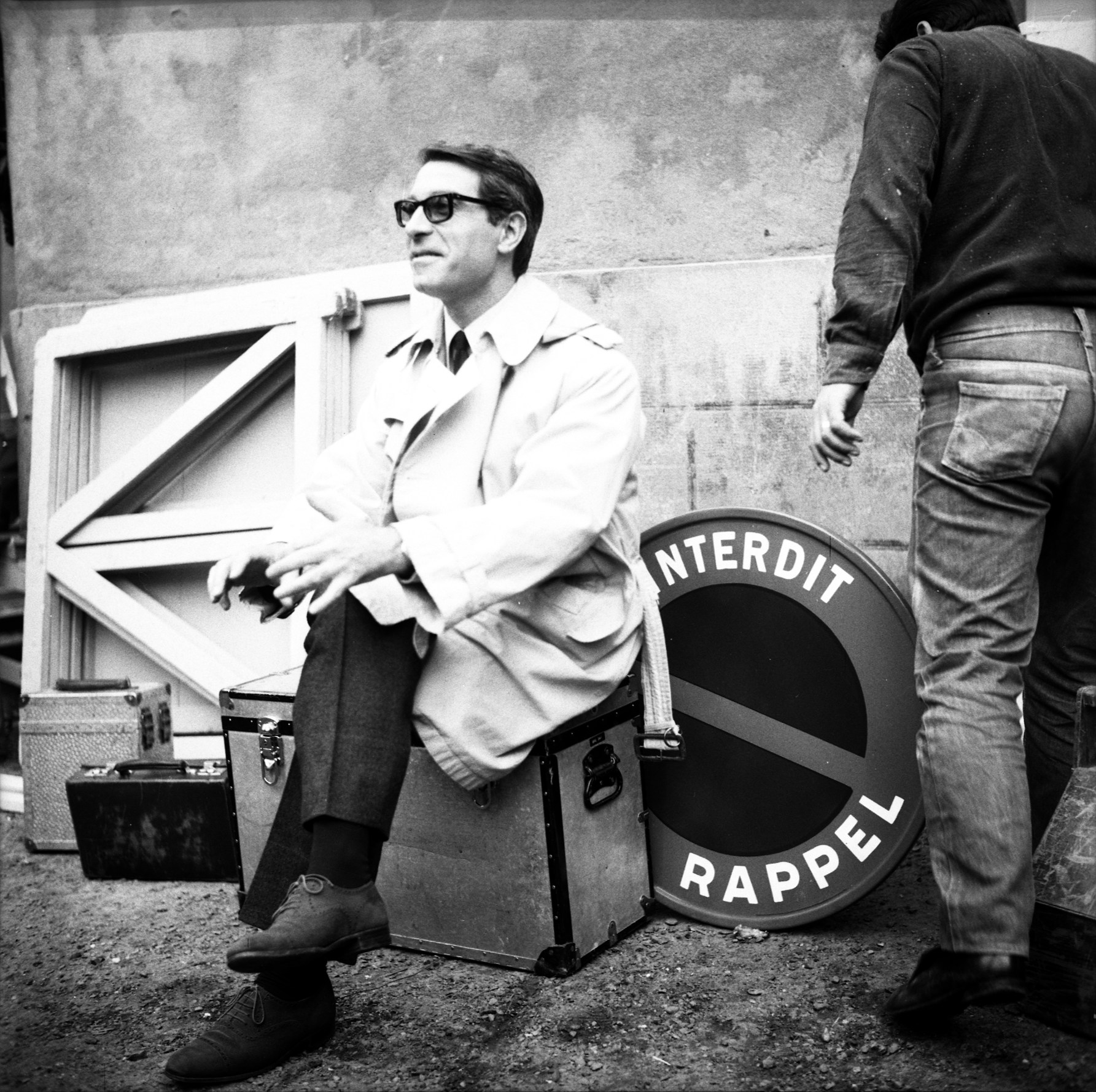
- Born: Jean Poiré; 17 August 1926; Paris, France
- Died: 14 March 1992 (aged 65); Suresnes, France
- Occupations: Actor, director, screenwriter, and playwright
- Known for: La Cage aux Folles

Jean Poiret, born Jean Poiré (17 August 1926 – 14 March 1992), was a French actor, director, and screenwriter. He is primarily known as the author of the original play La Cage aux Folles.

== Early career ==
Poiret was born in Paris, and first rose to prominence in 1951 playing the role of Fred Transport, one of the heroes of Pierre Dac and Francis Blanche's radio series Malheur aux Barbus. In 1952, he met his future co-star of La Cage Michel Serrault at the Sarah Bernhardt Theatre. They starred in the sketch "Jerry Scott, Vedette Internationale".

In 1961, Poiret, as a member of the French cinematic society Pathé, wrote and recorded "La Vache à Mille Francs", a parody of "La Valse à Mille Temps" by Jacques Brel.

In 1973, he married actress Caroline Cellier, with whom he had one child.

== La Cage aux Folles ==
In 1973, Poiret wrote and starred in the stage play La Cage aux Folles. Its film adaptation in 1978 brought Poiret immense success. Although Poiret was replaced by Italian actor Ugo Tognazzi in the role of Renato Baldi, Serrault reprised his stage-role of Zaza Napoli and won a César Award for his work.

== Later career ==
In 1992, Poiret directed Le Zèbre (The Zebra). his only film, an adaptation of Alexandre Jardin's novel. It starred Thierry Lhermitte and Caroline Cellier, and it was one of the top grossing films in France for the year and the highest-grossing debut European film for the year (with a gross of $12 million).

Poiret died of a heart attack in Suresnes on 14 March 1992, three months before the film's premiere. He is buried at the Cimetière du Montparnasse in Paris.

== Filmography ==
- 1953: Le Gang des pianos à bretelles (by Gilles de Turenne) - Le présentateur de 'La nuit brune' (uncredited)
- 1953: Les 3 Mousquetaires (by André Hunebelle)
- 1956: Cette sacrée gamine (by Michel Boisrond) - first inspector
- 1956: La Vie est belle (by Roger Pierre and Jean-Marc Thibault) - maracas player
- 1956: Assassins et voleurs (by Sacha Guitry) - Philippe d'Artois
- 1956: The Terror with Women (by Jean Boyer) - gendarme
- 1957: Adorables démons (by Maurice Cloche) - Julien Willis Jr
- 1957: The Innocent with Forty Children (by Philippe Agostini) - Master Bardine
- 1957: Ça aussi c'est Paris (Short, by Maurice Cloche) - reporter
- 1957: Clara et les méchants (by Raoul André) - Chantuer - un gangster
- 1959: Nina (by Jean Boyer) - Adolphe Tessier
- 1959: Oh ! Qué Mambo (by John Berry) - inspector Sapin
- 1959: Messieurs les ronds de cuir (by Henri Diamant-Berger) - René Lahrier
- 1959: Vous n'avez rien à déclarer ? (by Clément Duhour) - Robert de Trivelin
- 1960: La française et l'amour (by Charles Spaak) - Michel's lawyer (sketch Le divorce)
- 1960: Candide ou l'optimisme du XXe siècle (by Norbert Carbonnaux) - 1st policeman
- 1961: Ma femme est une panthère (by Raymond Bailly) - psychiatrist
- 1961: Auguste (by Pierre Chevalier) - Georges Flower
- 1962: Les parisiennes (by Michel Boisrond, Francis Cosne and Annette Wademant) - Jean-Pierre Leroy (segment "Antonia")
- 1962: The Dance (by Norbert Carbonnaux) - Old man
- 1962: It's Not My Business (by Jean Boyer) - Jean Duroc
- 1962: How to Succeed in Love (by Michel Boisrond) - Bernard Monod
- 1962: Les quatre vérités (by Hervé Bromberger) - Renard (Fox) (segment "Le corbeau et le renard")
- 1963: Les vierges (by Jean-Pierre Mocky) - the banker Marchaix
- 1963: Un drôle de paroissien (by Jean-Pierre Mocky) - Raoul
- 1963: La foire aux cancres (by Louis Daquin) - Collin
- 1964: Les durs à cuire ou comment supprimer son prochain sans perdre l'appétit (by Jacques Pinoteau) - Louis
- 1964: Jealous as a Tiger (by Darry Cowl) - doctor Raymond
- 1964: La grande frousse (by Jean-Pierre Mocky) - Loupiac
- 1965: Les baratineurs (by Francis Rigaud) - André
- 1965: La bonne occase (by Michel Drach) - Grégoire
- 1965: La tête du client (by Jacques Poitrenaud) - Philippe / Monsieur Paul
- 1965: Le petit monstre (by Jean-Paul Sassy) - the godfather
- 1966: Your Money or Your Life (by Jean-Pierre Mocky) - Lucien Pélépan
- 1967: Le grand bidule by Raoul André) - Verdier
- 1967: Ces messieurs de la famille (by Raoul André) - Bernard Le Gall
- 1968: La grande lessive (!) (by Jean-Pierre Mocky) - Jean-Michel Lavalette
- 1969: Aux frais de la princesse (by Roland Quignon) - Santos
- 1969: Trois hommes sur un cheval (by Marcel Moussy) - Tout / Freddy
- 1969: Ces messieurs de la gâchette (by Raoul André) - Bernard Le Gall
- 1970: Le Mur de l'Atlantique (by Marcel Camus) - Armand
- 1971: Mais qu'est-ce qui fait courir les crocodiles ? (by Jacques Poitrenaud) - Gontran
- 1979: La Gueule de l'autre (by Pierre Tchernia) - Jean-Louis Constant
- 1980: Le Dernier Métro (by François Truffaut) - Jean-Loup Cottins
- 1982: Que les gros salaires lèvent le doigt ! (by Denys Granier-Deferre) - André Joeuf
- 1984: La Septième Cible (by Claude Pinoteau) - Jean Michelis
- 1985: Poulet au vinaigre (by Claude Chabrol) - Inspector Jean Lavardin
- 1985: Liberté, Égalité, Choucroute (by Jean Yanne) - the caliph
- 1986: Inspecteur Lavardin (by Claude Chabrol) - Inspector Jean Lavardin
- 1986: Je hais les acteurs (by Gérard Krawczyk) - Orlando Higgin
- 1987: Le Miraculé (by Jean-Pierre Mocky) - Papu
- 1988: Les saisons du plaisir (by Jean-Pierre Mocky) - Bernard Germain
- 1988: Corentin (by Jean Marboeuf) - the exorcist
- 1988: Une nuit à l'Assemblée Nationale (by Jean-Pierre Mocky) - Octave Leroy
- 1988: La petite amie (by Luc Béraud) - Martin Morel
- 1990: Lacenaire (by Francis Girod) - Aliard
- 1991: Sissi la valse des cœurs (by Christoph Böll) - Herzog Max
- 1992: Rumeurs (by André Flédérick) - Alain
- 1992: Sup de fric (by Christian Gion) - Cyril Dujardin
- 2007: La méthode Barnol (by Jean-Pierre Mocky) - M. Hubert
