= Une nuit à l'Assemblée Nationale =

- Directed by: Jean-Pierre Mocky
- Written by: Jean-Pierre Mocky; Patrick Rambaud
- Produced by: Jean-Pierre Mocky; André Djaoui
- Starring: Jean Poiret; Michel Blanc; Jacqueline Maillan; Roland Blanche; Bernadette Lafont; Isabelle Mergault; Jean Benguigui; Darry Cowl
- Cinematography: Marcel Combes
- Edited by: Jean-Pierre Mocky; Marielle Guichard; Sophie Moyse; Hélène Sicard
- Music by: Gabriel Yared
- Production companies: Cinémax; Koala Films; SGGC
- Distributed by: BAC Films
- Release date: 8 June 1988
- Running time: 88 minutes
- Country: France
- Language: French
- Box office: $1.7 million

Une nuit à l'Assemblée Nationale (A Night at the National Assembly) is a 1988 French comedy film directed by Jean-Pierre Mocky.

== Plot ==
Walter Arbeit, an ecologist practising naturism, accompanies his mayor and MP, Dugland, to Paris where he is to be awarded the Legion of Honour. Soon after their arrival, Walter discovers that Dugland committed fraud in order to obtain this distinction. Annoyed, he walks the halls of the National Assembly, causing panic among the service staff.

== Cast ==
- Jean Poiret as Octave Leroy
- Michel Blanc as Walter Arbeit
- Jacqueline Maillan as Henriette Brulard
- Roland Blanche as Marius Agnello
- Bernadette Lafont as Madame Dugland
- Luc Delhumeau as Aimé Dugland
- Michel Francini as Colonel Raoul Dugommier
- Martyne Visciano as Marie-Hermine Leroy
- Isabelle Mergault as Fernande
- Dominique Zardi as Fricasset
- Jean Benguigui as Marcel
- Darry Cowl as Kayser
- Jean Abeillé as Plumet
- Jean-Pierre Clami as Delapine
- François Toumarkine as Tutti-Frutti
- Sophie Moyse as Olympe
- Louis Sautelet as Jean-François
- Marjorie Godin as Madame Boulet
- Josiane Balasko as The journalist
- Vadim Cotlenko as The President of the National Assembly
