= The Swindle (1997 film) =

1997 film

- Film poster
- Directed by: Claude Chabrol
- Written by: Claude Chabrol
- Produced by: Marin Karmitz
- Starring: Isabelle Huppert; Michel Serrault; François Cluzet; Jean-François Balmer; Jackie Berroyer; Jean Benguigui
- Cinematography: Eduardo Serra
- Edited by: Monique Fardoulis
- Distributed by: MK2 Diffusion
- Release date: 15 October 1997
- Running time: 104 minutes
- Country: France
- Language: French
- Budget: $9.1 million
- Box office: $7.9 million

The Swindle (French: Rien ne va plus) is a 1997 French crime comedy film, directed by Claude Chabrol that stars Isabelle Huppert and Michel Serrault.

The film initially focuses on a duo of con-artists who habitually prey on delegates in business conventions. They satisfy themselves with stealing only small amounts of each victim's property. The woman of the pair eventually decides to perform a more ambitious heist, and the duo steals millions from money launderers. When apprehended by the gangsters, they fool them by returning only part of the stolen money. The con-artists now have to face each other for possession of the remaining money.

== Plot ==
Victor and Betty are small-time confidence tricksters operating from a camper van who specialise in business conventions. Betty lures a delegate to a hotel room, where she slips him knock-out drops. Victor then joins her and they go through his cash, cheques, credit cards and passport. Victor's golden rule is never to be greedy, instead taking just a bit from each victim.

Betty enjoys exercising her powers of attraction, however, and gets more ambitious. She starts an affair with Maurice, who is a courier for money launderers and has to deliver an attaché case to the Caribbean. Victor reluctantly joins her plot, and they switch Maurice's case, which contains 5 million Swiss francs, for an identical case they have filled with newspaper. When Maurice's contacts find they have been swindled, they first torture him to death and then go looking for Victor and Betty. After the two have undergone some brutal questioning, they hand over the right case with 2.8 million Swiss francs in it. Fooled by Victor's golden rule, the gangsters let the pair go.

Victor, cross with Betty for stepping out of their league and endangering their lives, disappears with the 2.2 million Swiss francs he kept. She tracks him down at his Swiss hideaway and in the end the two make up.

== Cast ==
- Isabelle Huppert as Elizabeth / Betty
- Michel Serrault as Victor
- François Cluzet as Maurice Biagini
- Jean-François Balmer as Monsieur K
- Jackie Berroyer as Robert Chatillon
- Jean Benguigui as Guadeloupe Gangster
- Mony Dalmès as Signora Trotti (as Mony Dalmes)
- Thomas Chabrol as Swiss Desk Clerk
- Yves Verhoeven as Pickpocket
- Henri Attal as Greek Vendor
