= César Award for Best Producer =

French film award

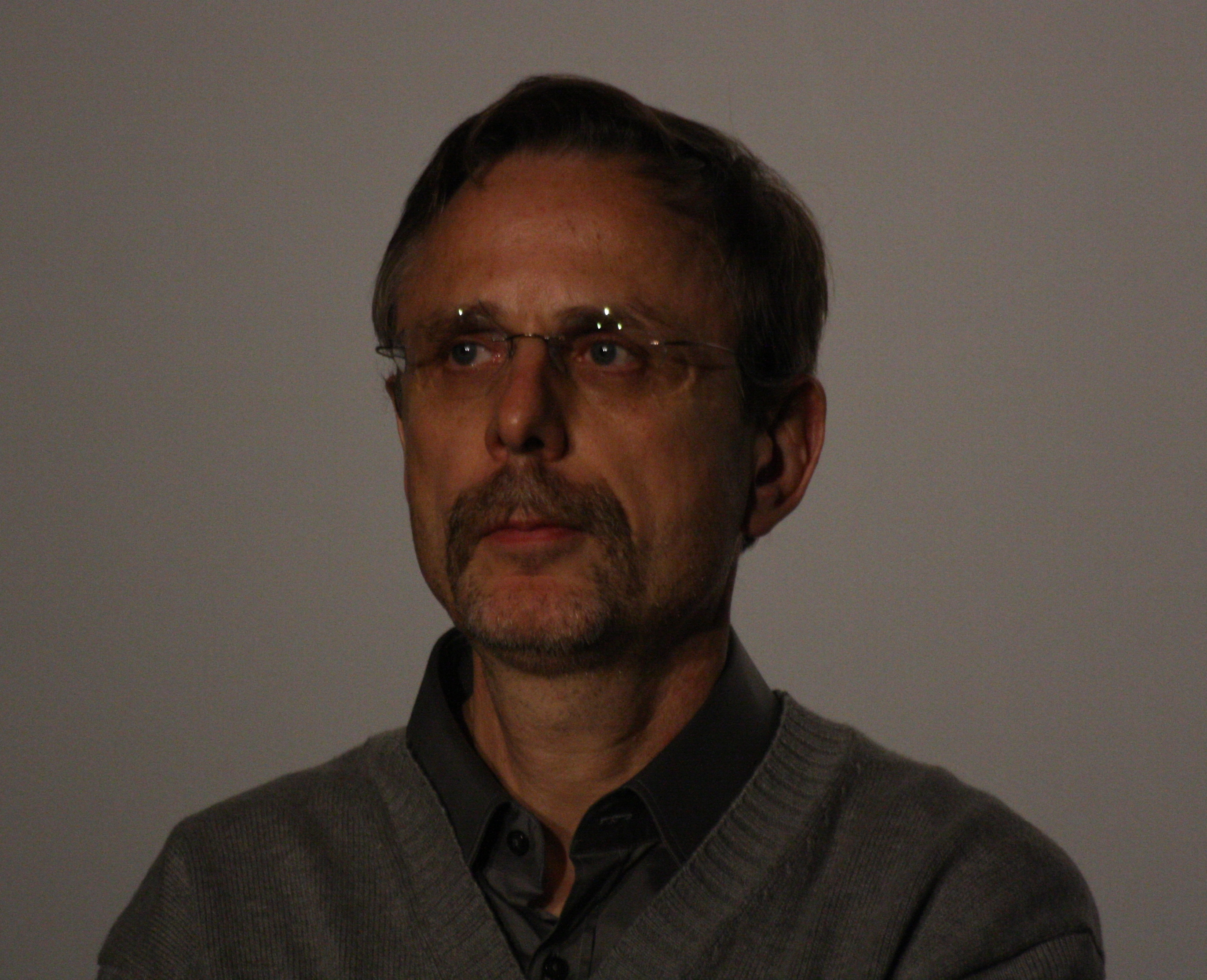
Christophe Rossignon received the award in 1996

The César Award for the Best Producer (French: César du meilleur producteur) was one of the César Awards but it was awarded only twice, in 1996 and in 1997. This award is now given at a sister ceremony, the Prix Daniel Toscan du Plantier.

== Winners and nominees ==
Year	Winner	Original title	Cinematographer
1996 (21st)	Hate	La haine	Christophe Rossignon
1997 (22nd)	Microcosmos	Microcosmos: Le peuple de l'herbe	Jacques Perrin
