= Jealous as a Tiger =

1964 film

- Directed by: Maurice Delbez; Darry Cowl
- Written by: Darry Cowl; Serge de Boissac; Jean-Marie Pelaprat; Jacques Vilfrid
- Produced by: Jules Borkon
- Starring: Darry Cowl; Francis Blanche; Jean Poiret
- Cinematography: Jean Fontenelle
- Edited by: Geneviève Vaury
- Music by: Darry Cowl; Jean-Michel Defaye
- Production companies: Champs-Élysées Productions; Lambor Films
- Distributed by: Société Nouvelle de Cinématographie
- Release date: 9 October 1964
- Running time: 86 minutes
- Country: France
- Language: French

Jealous as a Tiger (French: Jaloux comme un tigre) is a 1964 French comedy film directed by Darry Cowl and Maurice Delbez and starring Darry Cowl, Francis Blanche and Jean Poiret.

== Cast ==
- Darry Cowl as Henri
- Francis Blanche a Le chauffeur
- Jean Poiret as Le docteur Raymond
- Michel Serrault as M. Lurot
- Jean Richard as Le monsieur à la voiture accidentée
- Dany Saval as Jeanine
- Rolande Kalis as Sophie
- Jean Yanne as Alphonse
- Denise Provence as Mme Lurot
- Michael Lonsdale as L'automobiliste qui grimace
- France Rumilly as La secrétaire
- Françoise Dorin as Mme Raymond
- René-Jean Chauffard as le bijoutier qui cherche des escargots
- Jeannette Batti as Dame Toilette

== Bibliography ==
- Martin, Yves. Le cinéma français, 1946-1966: un jeune homme au fil des vagues. Editions Méréal, 1998.
