= À mort l'arbitre =

Kill the Referee
- Theatrical Release Poster
- Directed by: Jean-Pierre Mocky
- Screenplay by: Jacques Dreux
- Based on: The Death Penalty by Alfred Draper
- Produced by: Raymond Danon
- Starring: Michel Serrault; Eddy Mitchell; Carole Laure; Laurent Malet; Jean-Pierre Mocky; Claude Brosset
- Cinematography: Edmond Richard
- Edited by: Catherine Renault
- Music by: Alain Chamfort
- Production companies: Lira-Eléphant; R.T.Z. Production; TF1 Films Production
- Distributed by: Planfilm
- Release date: 22 February 1984 (France)
- Running time: 82 minutes
- Country: France
- Language: French

À mort l'arbitre (English translation: Kill the Referee) is a 1984 French thriller film, directed by Jean-Pierre Mocky. Based on the 1972 novel The Death Penalty by Alfred Draper, the film won Best Original Idea at the 1984 Mystfest and was nominated for Best Film in the same event.

== Plot ==
In the run-up to an important football match, police mount an operation to prevent trouble breaking out between rival fans. The operation is led by inspector Granowski and a young trainee, Philippon. The supporters of one of the teams, the violent and racist jaunes et noirs (yellow and blacks), arrive at the stadium, led by their leader Rico. During the game, the referee, Maurice Bruno (whose journalist girlfriend, Martine, is watching from the stands, next to Rico and his gang), awards a penalty, resulting in the jaunes et noirs losing the match, and leading to fighting between the two sets of supporters.

With the defeated and angry fans waiting for Maurice after the game, the team's physical therapist manages to sneak him and Martine out of the stadium in a van. The couple go to the local studios of FR3 (a fictionalized depiction of the real television channel: France 3) where Maurice takes part in a round table discussing football. Rico and his gang go to a pizza restaurant, where they see Maurice on the television. Hearing what Maurice is saying, they becoming increasingly agitated, shouting insults at his image on the television. Angrily, they set off to the TV studio to find him.

Maurice and his girlfriend manage to flee to a shopping center. The gang follow them into the center, then spread out to search, using an alarm signal to keep in touch. During the search Rico accidentally kills Béru, a fellow gang member, and blames the murder on Maurice. Determined to avenge their friend, Rico and the gang comb the stadium entrance for any trace of the referee. Their search eventually leads them to Martine's home.

When they arrive at her home, they find Martine and Maurice inside. The gang cut the power to the house and set about trying to gain entrance using any means possible, with Rico attacking the door with a blowtorch. Martine alerts the neighbors, and manages to injure Rico's hand. She is then able to flee the house with Maurice, who has managed to stop two of the gang members from gaining entry, and the couple climb to the top of the building to escape the attack.

As the assault continues, Martine's sister is attacked, but is rescued by Maurice. One of the supporters dies from a fall after coming to the realization that it was in fact Rico who had killed Béru. The gang continues to ransack the neighbors' apartments, going so far as to attack some of them. The pursuit continues into a factory, where the gang beats up a security guard, while Maurice gets rid of two of their supporters.

Rico catches up with the couple, in the factory, and threatens them with an axe, but Granowski arrives with other police personnel before he can carry out his threat. One of the supporters, Mayor, is armed with a gun. He shoots at Maurice, then refuses to give himself up and is killed by Granowski. Maurice and Martine flee in a car, with Rico hot on their heels in his gang's bus. After a pursuit around a large construction site, Rico knocks the couple's car off a ledge with his bus. The car falls a few meters to the ground, apparently killing its two occupants. Granowski arrives at the scene moments later in his car.

With his mission accomplished, Rico walks away from the scene, gleefully ranting, raving, gesturing, and proffering insults to the excavation workers around him. A police car is seen catching up with him just as the film ends.

== Cast ==
- Michel Serrault as Rico
- Carole Laure as Martine Vannier
- Eddy Mitchell as Maurice Bruno
- Laurent Malet as Teddy
- Claude Brosset as Albert
- Jean-Pierre Mocky as Inspector Granowski
- Géraldine Danon as Cathy, Martine's sister

== Reception ==
À mort l'arbitre wasn't as successful as hoped for in French cinemas (box office figures of 359,972 - 103,804 of those in Paris) though it did receive largely favorable reviews, with Jacques Morice of Télérama describing Michel Serrault as impeccable and chilling in his role as a belligerent proletarian.

Not until it was seen on French television by 17 million viewers in 1989, as part of a series called Dossiers de l'écran (literally "screen files": each episode consisted of the broadcast of a film dealing with a chosen theme followed by discussions with studio guests on the same theme) and after the Hillsborough and Heysel disasters, did À mort l'arbitre become a success and begin to establish itself as a cult film and one of director Jean-Pierre Mocky's classics.

In 2006 French newspaper Libération described the film as a disturbing, and still relevant, satire on the fanaticism of football supporters, and the director Jean-Pierre Mocky as one of the rare French film makers capable of making such a high-caliber, risk-taking social drama.
