= The Double Bed =

Le Lit à deux places
- Directed by: Jean Delannoy; François Dupont-Midi
- Written by: Darry Cowl; Jean-Loup Dabadie
- Produced by: Jacques-Paul Bertrand
- Cinematography: Gaston Muller
- Edited by: Henri Taverna
- Music by: Georges Garvarentz
- Release date: 1965
- Running time: 120 minutes
- Countries: France, Italy
- Language: French

The Double Bed or Le Lit à deux places is a 1965 French and Italian film directed by Jean Delannoy and François Dupont-Midi.

== Cast ==
- France Anglade ... Wife
- Jacques Audoux ... (segment 3 "La répétition")
- Dominique Boschero ... Colette - the fiancée (segment 3 "La répétition")
- Lando Buzzanca
- Carla Calò ... Mother
- Jacques Charon ... the fiancé (segment 3 "La répétition")
- Darry Cowl ... the fiancée's brother (segment 3 "La répétition")
- Denise Gence ... Mamounette (segment 3 "La répétition")
- Margaret Lee ... Carmela
- Clément Michu ... (segment 3 "La répétition")
- Jean Parédès ... the antiquary (segment 3 "La répétition")
- Jean Richard ... Father
- Michel Sardou ... (segment 3 "La répétition")
- Michel Serrault ... Albert
