= Head Against the Wall =

1959 French film

- Directed by: Georges Franju
- Screenplay by: Jean-Pierre Mocky (adaptation); Jean-Charles Pichon (dialogue)
- Based on: La Tête contre les murs; Herve Bazin
- Produced by: Jean Velter
- Starring: Pierre Brasseur; Paul Meurisse; Jean-Pierre Mocky; Anouk Aimée; Charles Aznavour; Jean Galland
- Cinematography: Eugen Schüfftan
- Edited by: Suzanne Sandberg
- Music by: Maurice Jarre
- Production companies: La Société des films Sirius; ATICA; Elpénor Films
- Distributed by: La Société des films Sirius
- Release date: 20 March 1959 (France)
- Running time: 92 minutes
- Country: France
- Language: French

Head Against the Wall (French: La Tête contre les murs), also titled The Keepers, is a 1959 French drama film directed by Georges Franju starring Pierre Brasseur, Paul Meurisse, Jean-Pierre Mocky, Anouk Aimée, and Charles Aznavour. It was director Franju's debut feature film. The story follows an aimless young man who is institutionalized for defying his wealthy father, and in the process airs several questions about how society defines and treats mental illness.

== Plot ==
François, the carefree son of an influential lawyer, has no qualifications and no job. To mix with rich and superficial friends, he has borrowed money that he cannot repay. In search of money, he breaks into his father's desk, steals his cash, and wantonly burns one of his legal documents. Rather than call the police, his father has him committed to an isolated psychiatric hospital in the country. François discovers that many of the inmates are not seriously deranged, but Dr. Varmont, senior doctor of the ward where he is interned, is of the opinion that the mentally ill should be locked away from society.

François befriends Lenoir, a criminal hiding from gangland revenge, and Heurtevent, a gentle epileptic. To his joy, Stéphanie, a girl he met on his last night of freedom, pays him a visit. She knows that he is not insane and urges him to get a grip on his life. At the end of the visiting hour, François tries to sneak out with the other people leaving the hospital, but is caught by one of the wardens. Under the influence of pentobarbital, François tells Varmont that he blames his father for his mother's suicide when he was still a boy.

From Heurtevent François learns of the ward of Dr. Emery, whose methods of treatment are more progressive than Varmont's, but Emery does not have the capacities to accept new patients. After telling Dr. Varmont he wants to be reconciled, François is paid a visit by his father, but the meeting is a failure, and release seems remote. Together with Heurtevent, he makes an escape attempt, but his friend collapses in an epileptic seizure while he himself is wounded by a local with his gun. In despair, Heurtevent later hangs himself.

François plans another escape during Heurtevent's funeral, as the hospital cemetery is located outside the walls of the institution. Lenoir gives him an address in Paris where he can find a job and a place to sleep. Making a successful getaway, François finds out that the given address is an illegal gambling den. Unsure if this is a milieu he wants to enter, he goes unannounced to Stéphanie's room, who lets him stay at her place and spends the night with him. In the morning, two plainclothes men looking for François appear at Stéphanie's door, but she pretends not to know his whereabouts. François makes preparations to escape, refusing Stéphanie's offer to accompany him. He slips out and, caught in the stairway by the two men who had been waiting for him, is rushed back to the asylum.

== Cast ==
- Pierre Brasseur as Dr. Varmont
- Paul Meurisse as Dr. Emery
- Jean-Pierre Mocky as François Gérane
- Anouk Aimée as Stéphanie
- Jean Galland as Maître Gérane
- Thomy Bourdelle as Colonel Donnadieu
- Jean Ozenne as Comte Elzéar de Chambrelle
- Charles Aznavour as Heurtevent
- Rudy Lenoir as the stashed
- Roger Legris as Decauville the driver
- Henri San Juan as the patron of the pool
- Édith Scob as the crazy singer
- Max Montavon as internal to the refectory
- Luis Masson as the internal
- Luc Andrieux as a nurse
- Jacques Mancier as the man with the gun
- Pierre Mirat as a guard
- Henri Poirier as the priest
- Jacques Seiler as a nurse

== Reception ==
Upon its release, Head Against the Wall received praise by the critics of Cahiers du Cinéma, especially by Jean-Luc Godard, who noted that Franju "seeks the madness behind reality, because it is for him the only way to rediscover the true face of reality behind this madness […] Franju demonstrates the necessity of Surrealism if one considers it as a pilgrimage to the sources."

== Soundtrack ==
In February 2005, the French soundtrack record label Play Time released Maurice Jarre's film music on Compact Disc, along with other scores Jarre composed for films by Franju.
