= The Indestructible (film) =

1959 film

- Directed by: Jean Boyer
- Written by: Robert Goffin (story); Henri Torrès; Jacques Vilfrid; Jean Boyer
- Produced by: Roland Girard
- Starring: Fernandel; Line Renaud; Michel Galabru
- Cinematography: Charles Suin
- Edited by: Jacqueline Brachet
- Music by: Louis Gasté
- Production company: Les Films du Cyclope
- Distributed by: Columbia Films
- Release date: 29 April 1959
- Running time: 84 minutes
- Country: France
- Language: French

The Indestructible (French: L'increvable) is a 1959 French comedy film directed by Jean Boyer and starring Darry Cowl, Line Renaud and Michel Galabru.

The film's sets were designed by the art director, Robert Giordani.

== Cast ==
- Darry Cowl as Hippolyte
- Line Renaud as Liliane Robustal
- Michel Galabru as Augustin Robustal
- René Havard as Loulou
- Patricia Karim as L'aviatrice
- Robert Rollis as L'agent d'assurances
- Lucien Raimbourg as Mr. Boudoux
- Roland Armontel as Pivois
- Francis Blanche as Francis Blanchard
- François Marié
- Jacques Mancier
- Tania Miller
- Gisèle André
- Jack Ary

== Bibliography ==
- Goble, Alan. The Complete Index to Literary Sources in Film. Walter de Gruyter, 1999.
