= Deux heures moins le quart avant Jésus-Christ =

Deux heures moins le quart avant Jésus-Christ (Quarter to Two B.C.)
- Directed by: Jean Yanne
- Written by: Jean Yanne
- Produced by: Tarak Ben Ammar; Claude Berri
- Starring: Coluche, Michel Serrault, Jean Yanne
- Cinematography: Mario Vulpiani
- Edited by: Hervé de Luze
- Music by: Raymond Alessandrini and Jean Yanne
- Distributed by: AMLF
- Release date: 6 October 1982
- Running time: 110 minutes
- Country: France
- Language: French
- Box office: $34,509,292

Deux heures moins le quart avant Jésus-Christ (Quarter to Two B.C.) is a 1982 French comedy film directed by Jean Yanne. The film relates the story of the garage mechanic Ben-Hur Marcel, also known as Aminemephet (Coluche), who gets wrapped up organizing a plot against Caesar (Michel Serrault). The picture is an anachronistic parody of Bible films like Ben-Hur, somewhat comparable to Monty Python's Life of Brian (1979). It has become a cult film in France.

== Plot ==
During the Roman Empire, a modest cart maker found himself the victim of a political plot targeting Julius Caesar.

In this parody of peplum, peopled with anachronisms, a garage mechanic for carts, Ben-Hur Marcel finds himself unwillingly representative of the union against the Roman army. Caught up in a story of a plot against a homosexual Caesar and interested only in his hairstyle and the drape of his toga, Ben-Hur Marcel finds himself embroiled in a political embarrassment towards ancient Egypt and its queen, Cleopatra VII, decked out in an accent of the Parisian suburbs. He will get by thanks to the talent of his friend Paulus.

At first glance, the satire is aimed first at state power which presents all the usual flaws: liar, cynical, manipulator, contemptuous, hateful, but also fearful: "Citizens, we can do nothing for the moment ... But as soon as possible as we can, we will do double! The people, cowardly and submissive (cf. the final speech of Ben-Hur Marcel to all the protagonists), and the operetta revolutionaries also take it for their rank: if things are going so badly, it is because, in the end, they let it go. And, in the end, everyone forgets while watching the silliness of the television news during which the birth of a child is announced in a stable in Bethlehem.

The film ends with an involuntary ironic retort from Ben-Hur Marcel: "The birth of a child in a stable won't change the face of the world!" At this moment we hear the first three fortissimo notes of the music written by Miklós Rósza for the film Ben-Hur (1959) by William Wyler.

== Cast ==
- Coluche as Ben-Hur Marcel / Aminemephet
- Michel Serrault as César
- Jean Yanne as Paulus
- Françoise Fabian as Laetitia
- Michel Auclair as Consul Demetrius
- Mimi Coutelier as Cleopatra
- Darry Cowl as Faucuius
- Paul Préboist as The Lion Keeper
- Daniel Emilfork as Tatouius
- Valérie Mairesse as A Prostitute
- André Pousse as A centurion
- Michel Constantin as Secutor
- José Artur as Reginus

== Discography ==
The CD soundtrack composed by Raymond Alessandrini and Jean Yanne was released on the Music Box Records label.
