= Le Mentor =

- Directed by: Jean-Pierre Mocky
- Written by: Jean-Pierre Mocky; André Ruellan
- Starring: Jean-Pierre Mocky; Solène Hebert; Clovis Fouin; Simon Coutret
- Cinematography: Jean-Paul Sergent
- Edited by: Jean-Pierre Mocky
- Music by: Vladimir Cosma
- Production company: Mocky Delicious Products
- Release date: 10 April 2013 (France)
- Running time: 83 minutes
- Country: France
- Language: French

Le Mentor is a 2013 French film directed by Jean-Pierre Mocky.

== Plot ==
The film portrays a family and follows in particular a young woman on a journey of discovery and love.

== Cast ==
- Jean-Pierre Mocky (Ludovic)
- Solène Hebert (Annette)
- Clovis Fouin (Christian)
- Simon Coutret (Alexandre)
- Marina Monmirel (Caroline)
- Freddy Bournane (Joe "la limace")
- Paméla Ravassard (the lady with the buggy)
- Jean Abeillé (Mr Béchamin)
- Cyrille Dobbels (Huissier)
- Alain Kruger (Banquier)
- Noëlle Leiris (the blonde)
- Fabrice Colson (the big man)
- Gilles Lecoq (the hotel manager)
- Pascal Lagrandeur (the waiter)
- Christian Chauvaud (Claverie)
- Christophe Bier (the clerk)
- Marie-Philomène Nga (Krishna)
- Michel Vaniglia (the tramp who plays the guitar)
- Cédric Tuffier (a tramp)
- Michel Stobac (a young tramp)
- Guillaume Delaunay (the giant in the locker room)
- Catherine Berriane (the lady in the locker room)
- Emmanuel Nakach (the cheesemonger in the supermarket)
- Sarah Bensoussan (the lady in the park)
- Frédéric Buret (the waiter who serves the trout)
- Alain Schlosberg (Fripier)
- David Blanc (the presenter)
- Olivier Defrocourt (inspector C&A)
- Catherine Van Hecke (Gisèle)
- Olivier Hémon (doctor)
- Joelle Hélary (the female dog owner)
- Nathan Agüero (the beggar)
- Jess Liaudin (the barker)
- Jean-Michel Moulhac (the manager at the porch)
- Noël Simsolo (Mr Troublot)
- Patrick Diwen (the guy at the porch)
- Aude Roman (the young woman)
- Dominique Boissel (the advocat)
- Serge Bos (the priest)
- Alain Vettese (Annette's father)
- Michel Fréret-Roy (the jeweller)
- José Exposito (prison guard)
- Martin Delavenne (prison guard)
- Antoine Delelis (the man at the ballon)

== Release ==
The film was released in Paris on 10 April 2013. As of 2014 it is not yet available in the US on DVD or Blu-ray.

== See also ==
- Cinema of France
- List of French language films
