= Litan (film) =

- Original French theatrical release poster
- Directed by: Jean-Pierre Mocky
- Written by: Jean-Pierre Mocky; Jean-Claude Romer; Patrick Granier; Scott Baker; Suzy Baker
- Produced by: Jean-Pierre Mocky
- Starring: Marie-José Nat; Jean-Pierre Mocky; Nino Ferrer; Marisa Muxen
- Cinematography: Edmond Richard
- Edited by: Jean-Pierre Mocky; Catherine Renault
- Music by: Nino Ferrer
- Production companies: Films A2; M. Films
- Distributed by: Coline; Océanic Films
- Release date: 24 February 1982
- Running time: 88 minutes
- Country: France
- Language: French

Litan is a 1982 French horror film produced, edited and directed by Jean-Pierre Mocky and co-written with Jean-Claude Romer. It stars Marie-José Nat, Jean-Pierre Mocky, Nino Ferrer, and Marisa Muxen.

“Litan” is also recognised under alternate titles, including “La cité des spectres verts” and “Le voleur de visages,” which may vary by region.

== Plot summary ==
A young couple passes through the village of Litan as the locals hold a Festival of the Dead. As the festival progresses, strange, and eerie events occur that reveals something sinister at work. Fearing for their lives, the couple decided to flee the village before they too become overtaken by the dark implications of the celebration and become shadows of their former selves.

== Cast ==
- Marie-José Nat - Nora
- Jean-Pierre Mocky - Jock
- Nino Ferrer - Le docteur Steve Julien
- Marisa Muxen - Estelle Servais
- Bill Dunn - Cornell
- Georges Wod - Bohr
- Dominique Zardi - Le chef des fous

== Release ==
Litan, was released in France on February 24, 1982. The film was recently re-released in a 4K restoration on May 4, 2022.

== Reception ==
=== Awards and nominations ===
Litan won the Critics Award at the Avoriaz Fantastic Film Festival. It also won the award for Best Screenplay at the Catalonian International Film Festival.
