= Heaven Sent (film) =

1963 film

- Directed by: Jean-Pierre Mocky
- Written by: Jean-Pierre Mocky; Michel Servin
- Produced by: Henri Diamant-Berger; Jérôme Goulven
- Starring: Bourvil
- Cinematography: Léonce-Henri Burel
- Edited by: Marguerite Renoir
- Music by: Joseph Kosma
- Distributed by: Société Nouvelle de Cinématographie (SNC)
- Release date: 28 August 1963
- Running time: 92 minutes
- Country: France
- Language: French

Heaven Sent (French: Un drôle de paroissien) is a 1963 French comedy film directed by Jean-Pierre Mocky. It was entered into the 13th Berlin International Film Festival. The film has been released under the name Heaven Sent in the English speaking world.

== Plot ==
Georges Lachaunaye is a young member of an impoverished family of ancient nobility. His lack of financial means and his disdain for labour make him a thief who helps himself by robbing the collection boxes of churches.

== Cast ==
- Bourvil as Georges Lachaunaye
- Francis Blanche as Chief Insp. Cucherat
- Jean Poiret as Raoul
- Jean Yonnel as Mattieu Lachesnaye, Georges' father
- Jean Tissier as Brigadier Bridoux
- Véronique Nordey as Françoise Lachaunaye
- Bernard Lavalette as the Police Prefect
- Marcel Pérès as Raillargaud (as Marcel Perez)
- Jean Galland as the college principal / the bishop
- Solange Certain as Juliette Lachaunaye, Georges's wife
- Denise Péronne as Aunt Clair
- Roger Legris as the beadle at the church of Saint-Étienne du Mont
