= Happiness Is in the Field =

Happiness Is in the Field (Le bonheur est dans le pré)
- Directed by: Étienne Chatiliez
- Written by: Florence Quentin
- Produced by: Charles Gassot
- Starring: Michel Serrault; Eddy Mitchell; Sabine Azéma; Carmen Maura
- Cinematography: Philippe Welt
- Edited by: Anne Lafarge
- Music by: Pascal Andreacchio
- Distributed by: BAC Films
- Release date: 1995
- Running time: 106 min
- Country: France
- Language: French
- Budget: $10.2 million
- Box office: $32.9 million

Happiness Is in the Field (French: Le bonheur est dans le pré) is a French comedy directed by Étienne Chatiliez in 1995.

== Plot ==
Francis Bergeade, owner of a small plumbing supply company in Dole, has just turned 65 and his life is a misery. Tax services are harassing him, his snobby wife Nicole despises him, and his daughter wants an expensive wedding. Francis knows only moments of relief while lunching and dining in fancy restaurants with his best friend, car dealer Gérard. Stress becomes overwhelming and he suffers an attack from a blocked nerve.

During his convalescence, his family watch a reality television show about long-lost relationships and disappearances called Où es-tu? (Where are you?) featuring Spanish-born Dolorès Thivart and her daughters "Zig" and "Puce", producers of foie gras from Condom, who seek their husband and father, Michel, who vanished 27 years ago appears to be an exact lookalike of Francis…

== Cast ==
- Michel Serrault as Francis Bergeade
- Eddy Mitchell as Gérard Thulliez
- Sabine Azéma as Nicole Bergeade
- Carmen Maura as Dolores Thivart
- François Morel as Pouillaud
- Guilaine Londez as Zig Thivart
- Daniel Russo as André
- Catherine Jacob as Lolotte André
- Alexandra London as Géraldine Bergeade
- Eric Cantona as Lionel
- Joël Cantona as Nono
- Roger Gicquel as Charles
- Yolande Moreau as Lucette
- Serge Hazanavicius as Alexis Legoff
- Virginie Darmon as Puce Thivart
- Christophe Kourotchkine as Rémi
- Jean Bousquet as Father Léonard
- Isabelle Nanty as A Worker
- Olivier Saladin as Car Showroom Customer

== Filming ==
Happiness Is in the Field was filmed largely in the Gers department, particularly in Vic-Fezensac.

== Reception ==
The film grossed $30.9 million in France, $0.6 million in the United States and Canada and $1.4 million in other markets for a worldwide gross of $32.9 million.

== Awards ==
Eddy Mitchell received the 1996 César Award for Best Actor in a Supporting Role for his role in the film.
