= Darry Cowl =

French actor (1925–2006)

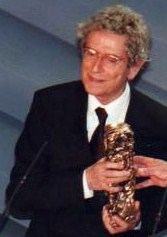
- Cowl at 2001 César ceremony
- Born: André Darricau; 27 August 1925; Vittel, France
- Died: 14 February 2006 (aged 80); Neuilly-sur-Seine, France
- Occupations: Actor, musician

Darry Cowl (born André Darricau; 27 August 1925 – 14 February 2006) was a French comedian, actor and musician. In 2001, he was honoured with an Honorary César before winning a César Award for Best Actor in a Supporting Role three years later (in 2004) for his role as a concierge in Pas sur la bouche (Not on the lips), which was his last appearance.

He was born in Vittel and came to prominence when he was cast by Sacha Guitry in Assassins et voleurs (1956) (Assassins and Robbers). Following this he turned to acting in cinema roles and soon gained celebrity status with his role as Antoine Péralou in Le Triporteur (1957) (The Tricycle).

A game addict, he often acted only for money in films that did not stretch his acting ability. He explained this by noting he did not read the script (or, on occasion, know the title) of the work in which he was to act.

He had hoped to return to theatre acting in Hold Up in September 2005 but ill-health prevented this. At age 80, he died in Neuilly-sur-Seine from complications of lung cancer.

== Selected filmography ==
- Four Days in Paris (1955) - L'aviculteur
- The Duratons (1955) - M. Mathieu - le surveillant général
- Maid in Paris (1956) - Daniel, le casseur d'assiettes
- Bonjour sourire (1956) - Le médecin
- Naughty Girl (1956) - Man with Suitcase
- Ces sacrées vacances (1956) - Un voisin
- La joyeuse prison (1956) - Maître Larigot
- Plucking the Daisy (1956) - Hubert Dumont
- Short Head (1956) - Le réceptionniste de l'hôtel
- Paris, Palace Hotel (1956) - Jules Hoyoyo
- Lovers and Thieves (1956) - Jean-Henri Lardenois - le faux témoin
- Les lumières du soir (1956) - (uncredited)
- L'amour descend du ciel (1957) - Dédé
- Love in Jamaica (1957) - Pater Noster
- Cinq millions comptant (1957) - Philémon de Montfilet
- Les 3 font la paire (1957) - Henri Valpreux, le metteur en scène
- A Friend of the Family (1957) - Pierre Bernicaud
- Fric-frac en dentelles (1957) - Le détective amateur
- Les Lavandières du Portugal (1957) - Paul
- On Foot, on Horse, and on Wheels (1957) - Hubert
- This Pretty World (1957) - Gaston
- Fumée blonde (1957) - Emile Gachit
- The Tricyclist (1957) - Antoine Peyralout
- Le naïf aux 40 enfants (1957) - Le marchand d'échelles
- The Lady Doctor (1957) - Egisto
- Le temps des oeufs durs (1958) - Louis Stainval
- Chéri, fais-moi peur (1958) - Jérôme Lenoir
- Be Beautiful But Shut Up (1958) - L'inspecteur Jerome
- School for Coquettes (1958) - Gégène
- A Dog, a Mouse, and a Sputnik (1958) - Hubert
- Le petit prof (1959) - Jérôme Aubin
- Archimède le clochard (1959) - Arsène
- The Indestructible (1959) - Hippolyte
- Vous n'avez rien à déclarer? (1959) - Labaule
- Les affreux (1959) - Fernand Mouchette
- Monsieur Robinson Crusoe (1960) - Antoine Peyralout
- Bouche cousue (1960) - Martin
- Les pique-assiette (1960) - Edouard
- Love and the Frenchwoman (1960) - Dr. Dufieux (segment "Enfance, L'")
- Les fortiches (1961) - Riri et JoJo
- Les amours de Paris (1961) - Gimenez
- Un Martien à Paris (1961) - Pierre Dubois
- Les moutons de Panurge (1961) - Charles Renard
- Les livreurs (1961) - Édouard
- The Lions Are Loose (1961) - Richard (uncredited)
- Tales of Paris (1962) - Hubert Parker (segment "Ella")
- Girl on the Road (1962) - Le journaliste
- Tartarin of Tarascon (1962) - L'homme en panne dans le désert
- Les Bricoleurs (1963) - Félix
- L'abominable homme des douanes (1963) - Campo Santos
- People in Luck (1963) - Simon Taquet (segment "Une nuit avec une vedette")
- Strip Tease (1963) - Paul
- Les Saintes-Nitouches (1963)
- Le bon roi Dagobert (1963) - Le maître- bourreau Richardic
- Salad by the Roots (1964) - Gratiopoulos
- Jealous as a Tiger (1964) - Henri
- The Gorillas (1964) - Edouard
- Les gros bras (1964) - Ludovic Gabasse
- I magnifici brutos del West (1964) - Jackson
- Les baratineurs (1965) - César Brandini
- Déclic et des claques (1965) - Un invité
- La bonne occase (1965) - Le polytechnicien
- The Double Bed (1965) - Le frère de la fiancée (segment 3 "La répétition")
- La tête du client (1965) - L'agent André
- How to Keep the Red Lamp Burning (1965) - L'avocat de la défense (Léonard) (segment "Le procès")
- Up to His Ears (1965) - Biscoton
- Les combinards (1966) - Léo
- Les malabars sont au parfum (1966) - Cassius 0001
- Your Money or Your Life (1966) - Marquy
- Le grand bidule (1967) - Barratier
- Ces messieurs de la famille (1968) - Albert Pelletier
- Salut Berthe! (1968) - Didier
- Le bourgeois gentil mec (1969) - Perrugo
- Poussez pas grand-père dans les cactus (1969) - Doctor Biraque
- Ces messieurs de la gâchette (1970) - Albert Pelletier
- Elle cause plus, elle flingue (1972) - Le commissaire Adrien Bondu
- Oh, If Only My Monk Would Want (Ah! Si mon moine voulait...) (1973) - L'apothicaire
- Don't Touch the White Woman! (1974) - Maj. Archibald
- La gueule de l'emploi (1974) - Le patron de l'Arquebuse
- Y'a un os dans la moulinette (1974) - Gaston
- There's Nothing Wrong with Being Good to Yourself (C'est jeune et ça sait tout) (1974) - Le livreur
- Trop c'est trop (1975) - Lucifer
- Le jour de gloire (1976) - Le curé
- Arrête ton char... bidasse! (1977) - Colonel Lessard
- Un oursin dans la poche (1977) - Howard Bachs
- Général... nous voilà! (1978) - Le Père Blanc
- Les Borsalini (1980) - Pépé
- Voulez-vous un bébé Nobel? (1980) - Professor Joseph Menzano
- Les surdoués de la première compagnie (1981) - Colonel Boussardon
- Le bahut va craquer (1981) - Le prof de maths
- T'es folle ou quoi? (1982) - Himself
- Pour cent briques, t'as plus rien... (1982) - Le concierge flic
- On s'en fout... nous on s'aime (1982) - Le père de Julien
- Qu'est-ce qui fait craquer les filles... (1982) - The journalist
- Deux heures moins le quart avant Jésus-Christ (1982) - Faucuius
- Ça va pas être triste (1983) - Jack Renard, the Mayor
- On l'appelle Catastrophe (1983) - Le juge d'instruction
- Mon curé chez les Thaïlandaises (1983) - Tête-de-fer, le pirate
- Le téléphone sonne toujours deux fois!! (1985) - L'agent de police
- Liberté, égalité, choucroute (1985) - Rouget de l'Isle
- Suivez mon regard (1986) - Le cafetier
- Les Saisons du plaisir (1988) - Daniel D.
- Une nuit à l'Assemblée Nationale (1988) - Kayser
- Ville à vendre (1992) - Emilio Bingo - le vétérinaire
- Les Misérables (1995) - Le bouquiniste / Bookseller
- Ma femme me quitte (1996) - Stéphane Lasser
- Straight into the Wall (1997) - Le patient
- Augustin, King of Kung-Fu (1999) - René
- Drug Scenes (2000)
- Le nouveau Jean-Claude (2002) - Jeff
- If I Were a Rich Man (2002) - M. Sylvain
- Les Marins perdus (2003) - Falco
- Not on the Lips (2003) - Madame Foin
- Le Cou de la girafe (2004) - Léo
- Les Dalton (2004) - Le Vieil Homme
- L'homme qui rêvait d'un enfant (2006) - Jules K.
- La vie privée (2006) - Mr. Mellifond (final film role)
