= Francis Blanche =

French actor

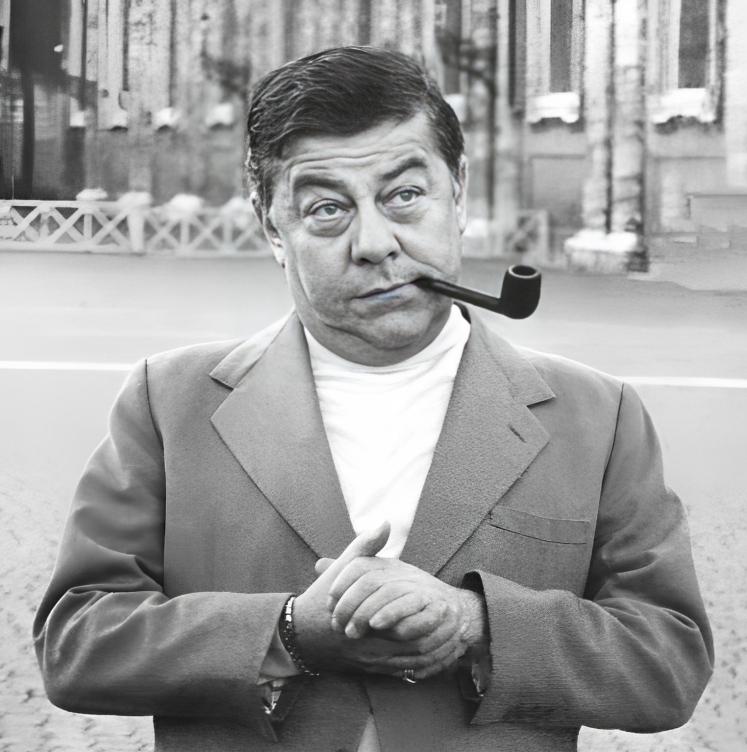
- Blanche in 1970
- Born: François Jean Blanche; July 21, 1921; 11th arrondissement of Paris
- Died: July 6, 1974 (aged 52); 15th arrondissement of Paris
- Occupation: Actor

François Jean Blanche, known as "Francis Blanche" (French pronunciation: [fʁɑ̃sis blɑ̃ʃ]; 20 July 1921 – 6 July 1974) was a French actor, singer, humorist and author. He was a very popular figure on stage, radio and in films, during the 1950s and 1960s.

== Early life ==
Blanche was born in an artistic family, mainly of stage actors—including his father Louis Blanche—and his uncle, Emmanuel Blanche, who was a painter. He completed his secondary schooling at fourteen, the youngest in France to do so at the time.

== Career ==
In the 1940s and 1950s, Blanche was part of Robert Dhéry's theatrical company Les Branquignols, with whom he played in the film Ah! Les belles bacchantes, starring Robert Dhéry, Colette Brosset (Dhéry's then-wife), and Louis de Funès; directed by Jean Loubignac in 1954.

Blanche teamed up with Pierre Dac to form a comic duo best remembered for Le Sâr Rabindranath Duval, a sketch about a phony and nonsensical Indian clairvoyant and guru (1957). They also created a popular and equally nonsensical radiophonic series, loosely based on a highly improbable espionage and conspiration plot, Malheur aux barbus, which was broadcast on Paris Inter in 213 episodes from 1951 to 1952. The same plot and characters were revived on Europe 1 in a series called Signé Furax, enjoying no less than 1,034 daily episodes between 1956 and 1960. Both broadcasts were phenomenal audience successes in the pre-television era. Blanche was also renowned for broadcasting phone pranks, in which he entertained listeners by making the most improbable situations sound plausible.

He wrote poems, and the lyrics of 673 songs. On stage, he acted in Tartuffe and Néron and, in 1955, Chevalier du Ciel, an operetta by Luis Mariano at the Gaîté-Lyrique theatre.

Blanche also enjoyed a successful cinematographic career, both as an actor and scriptwriter. He appeared as a hard-headed German colonel ("Obersturmführer Schulz") opposite Brigitte Bardot in Babette s'en va-t-en guerre (1959). He was one of the favourite actors of French filmmaker Georges Lautner, and played Maître Folace (a shady solicitor counselling a colourful gangster mob) in Les Tontons flingueurs (1963). Blanche also appeared in Boris Vassilief's Les Barbouzes (1964).

He delighted in parodying classical music, adapting famous works such as Schubert's "Die Forelle" (The Trout) into a crazy and slightly risqué piece about a 16-year-old romantic girl obsessed with Schubert's song to the point of giving birth to a live trout while performing it on her piano. Similarly, he turned Beethoven's 5th Symphony into a lengthy and quite repetitive musical glorification of the clothes peg and its fictitious inventor, Jérémie-Victor Opdebec.

== Death and burial ==
Blanche died at the age of 52, from a heart attack with a background of untreated Type 1 diabetes. He is buried in Èze cemetery.

== Selected filmography ==
- Frederica (1942)
- They Are Twenty (1950)
- Good Enough to Eat (1951)
- Ah! Les belles bacchantes (1954)
- Anyone Can Kill Me (1957)
- The Green Mare (1959)
- Babette Goes to War (1959)
- The Indestructible (1959)
- Operation Gold Ingot (1962)
- The Seventh Juror (1962)
- Tartarin of Tarascon (1962)
- Girl on the Road (1962)
- Un drôle de paroissien (1963)
- Les Tontons flingueurs (1963)
- The Black Tulip (1964)
- Champagne for Savages (1964)
- Jealous as a Tiger (1964)
- The Gorillas (1964)
- Belle de Jour (1966)
- The Senator Likes Women (1972)
- The Edifying and Joyous Story of Colinot (1973)
- La dernière bourrée à Paris (1973)
- Enuff Is Enuff (J'ai mon voyage!) - 1973
- Un linceul n'a pas de poches (1974)
- By the Blood of Others (1974)

== Selected discography ==
Blanche released several albums:
