= Eddy Mitchell =

French singer and actor

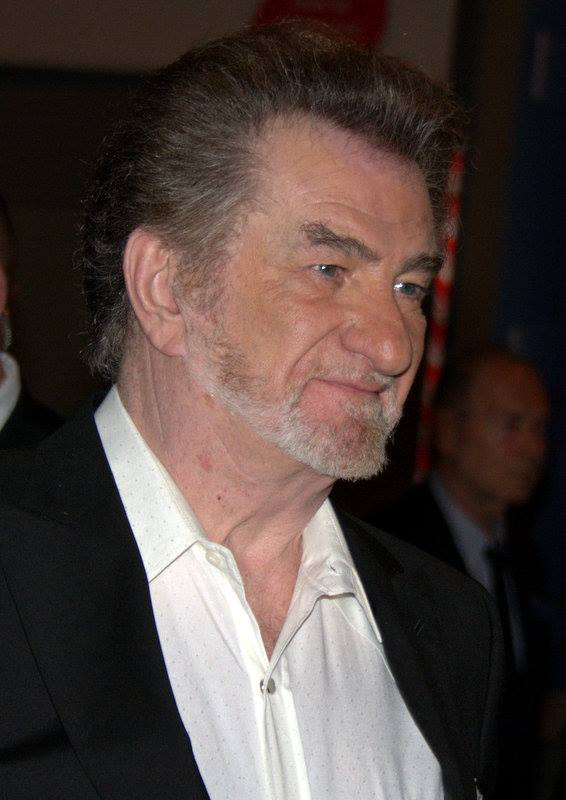
- Eddy Mitchell in 2014

Background information
- Born: Claude Moine; 3 July 1942 (age 84); Paris, France
- Genres: Rock, R&B, country
- Occupations: Singer-songwriter, actor
- Labels: Barclay, Polydor

Claude Moine (French pronunciation: [klod mwan]; born 3 July 1942), known professionally as Eddy Mitchell, is a French singer and actor. He began his career in the late 1950s, with the group Les Chaussettes Noires (The Black Socks). He took the name Eddy from the American expatriate tough-guy actor Eddie Constantine (later the star of Jean-Luc Godard's Alphaville), and chose Mitchell as his last name simply because it sounds American. The band performed at the Parisian nightclub Golf-Drouot before signing to Barclay Records and finding almost instant success; in 1961 it sold two million records.

Heavily influenced by American rock and roll, Mitchell (who went solo in 1963) has often recorded outside France, at first in London, but later in Memphis and Nashville, Tennessee. Guitarists Big Jim Sullivan and Jimmy Page and drummer Bobby Graham were among the British session musicians who regularly supported him in London. For his American recordings he employed session men such as Roger Hawkins, David Hood, Jimmy Johnson, Kenneth Buttrey, Reggie Young, David Briggs, Charlie McCoy, Leland Sklar, Booker T. Jones, Steve Cropper and others.

He received a César Award for Best Supporting Actor in 1996 for his role in the French comedy Le bonheur est dans le pré (1996) directed by Étienne Chatiliez.

A great lover of American films, Mitchell hosted La Dernière Séance, a TV show about American cinema from 1981 to 1998 on FR3 (later France 3). Its format was like an old-fashioned double-feature picture show, with two movies, cartoons, newsreels, and stage attractions. The title was taken from the name of one of Mitchell's albums, which in turn took it from the French title of the movie The Last Picture Show.

He is also the voice of Dylan (Flappy) in the French version of the 2005 film of The Magic Roundabout, as well as the voice of Chanticleer in the French version of Rock-a-Doodle.

== Discography ==
=== Albums ===
==== with Les 5 Rocks ====
- 1960 – Les 5 Rocks (remained unreleased until 1996)

with Les Chaussettes noires

- 1961 : 100% rock
- 1961 : Rock'n'Twist
- 1962 : Le 2 000 000e disque des Chaussettes noires (1st official studio album)
- 1962 : Comment réussir en amour (soundtrack of film with same title)
- 1963 : Chaussettes Noires Party (2nd and last studio album)

==== Solo studio albums ====
- 1963 : Voici Eddy... c'était le soldat Mitchell
- 1963 : Eddy in London
- 1964 : Panorama
- 1964 : Toute la ville en parle... Eddy est formidable
- 1965 : Du rock 'n' roll au rhythm 'n' blues
- 1966 : Perspective 66
- 1966 : Seul
- 1967 : De Londres à Memphis
- 1968 : Sept Colts pour Schmoll
- 1969 : Mitchellville
- 1971 : Rock n'Roll
- 1972 : Zig-zag
- 1972 : Dieu bénisse le rock'n'roll
- 1974 : Ketchup électrique
- 1974 : Rocking in Nashville
- 1975 : Made in USA
- 1976 : Sur la route de Memphis
- 1977 : La Dernière Séance
- 1978 : Après minuit
- 1979 : C'est bien fait
- 1980 : Happy Birthday
- 1982 : Le Cimetière des éléphants
- 1984 : Fan Album
- 1984 : Racines
- 1986 : Eddy Paris Mitchell
- 1987 : Mitchell
- 1989 : Ici Londres
- 1993 : Rio Grande
- 1996 : Mr. Eddy
- 1999 : Les Nouvelles Aventures d'Eddy Mitchell
- 2003 : Frenchy
- 2006 : Jambalaya
- 2009 : Grand écran
- 2010 : Come Back
- 2013 : Héros
- 2015 : Big Band
- 2017 : La Même Tribu (Volume 1)
- 2018 : La Même Tribu (Volume 2)
- 2021 : Country Rock
- 2024 : Amigos

==== Live albums ====
- 1969 : Olympia 69
- 1975 : Rocking in Olympia 1975
- 1978 : Palais des Sports 77
- 1981 : 20 ans : Eddy Mitchell Olympia
- 1984 : Palais des Sports 84
- 1991 : Casino de Paris 90
- 1994 : Retrouvons notre héros Eddy Mitchell à Bercy
- 1995 : Big Band au Casino de Paris
- 1995 : Country-Rock à l'Olympia
- 1995 : Show 94 au Zénith
- 1997 : Mr. Eddy à Bercy 97
- 2001 : Live 2000
- 2004 : Frenchy Tour
- 2007 : Jambalaya Tour
- 2011 : Ma Dernière Séance

==== Eddy Mitchell (Sessions outside France) ====
Eddy Mitchell recorded many albums mainly in the UK and in the United States, in the following locations:

- London (England):
  - 1967 – De Londres à Memphis
  - 1993 – Rio Grande (in London and in Muscle Shoals (Alabama))
- Nashville (Tennessee):
  - 1974 – Rocking in Nashville
  - 1975 – Made in USA
  - 1976 – Sur la route de Memphis
  - 1977 – La Dernière Séance
  - 1978 – Après minuit
  - 1979 – C'est bien fait (also in Muscle Shoals Alabama)
  - 1980 – Happy Birthday (also in Muscle Shoals Alabama)
  - 1981 – Le cimetière des éléphants (also in Los Angeles and New York City)
  - 1984 – Fan Album (également à Paris)
  - 1984 – Racines
  - 1987 – Mitchell
- Memphis and Nashville (Tennessee):
  - 1996 – Mr. Eddy
- Memphis, Tennessee, Los Angeles, California and New Orleans, Louisiana:
  - 1999 – Les nouvelles aventures d'Eddy Mitchell
- Los Angeles (California) :
  - 2003 – Frenchy
- Burbank (California):
  - 2007 – Jambalaya
  - 2009 – Grand Écran
  - 2010 – Comeback (also in Paris, France)

== Filmography ==
- Les Parisiennes, in the segment Ella (Jacques Poitrenaud,1962)
- Comment réussir en amour (Michel Boisrond, 1963)
- Nanou, TV series (Georges Régnier, 1970)
- Ça va plaire, TV musical (Jean-Pierre Cassel et Bernard Lion, 1980)
- Gaston Lapouge, TV film (Frank Apprederis, 1981)
- Coup de torchon (Bertrand Tavernier, 1981)
- My Other Husband (Georges Lautner, 1983)
- Ronde de nuit (Jean-Claude Missiaen, 1984)
- À mort l'arbitre (Jean-Pierre Mocky, 1983)
- Frankenstein 90 (Alain Jessua, 1984)
- La Galette du roi (Jean-Michel Ribes, 1986)
- I Love You (Marco Ferreri, 1986)
- Autour de minuit (Round Midnight) (cameo) (Bertrand Tavernier, 1986)
- Un père et passe (Sébastien Grall, 1989)
- Promotion canapé (Didier Kaminka, 1990)
- Until the end of the World (Bis ans Ende der Welt) (Wim Wenders, 1991)
- La Totale! (Claude Zidi, 1991)
- Ville à vendre (Jean-Pierre Mocky, 1992)
- La Cité de la peur (Alain Berbérian, 1994)
- Le bonheur est dans le pré (Étienne Chatiliez, 1995)
- Cuisine américaine (Jean-Yves Pitoun, 1998)
- Kitchendales (Chantal Lauby, 2000)
- Lovely Rita, sainte patronne des cas désespérés (Stéphane Clavier, 2003)
- Les Clefs de bagnole (Laurent Baffie, 2003)
- Frank Passingham, (2005)
- Un printemps à Paris (Springtime in Paris) (Jacques Bral, 2006)
- Populaire (Régis Roinsard, 2012)
- The Dream Kids (Vianney Lebasque, 2013)
- Salaud, on t'aime (Claude Lelouch, 2014)

== Bibliography ==
=== by Eddy Mitchell ===
- Galas, galères, autobiography (Éditions Jacques Grancher, 1979)
- Cocktail Story, recipes and anecdotes (R.M.C. Éditions, 1986)
- P'tit Claude, novel (L'Arbre à cames, 1994)
