= Michel Serrault =

French actor (1928–2007)

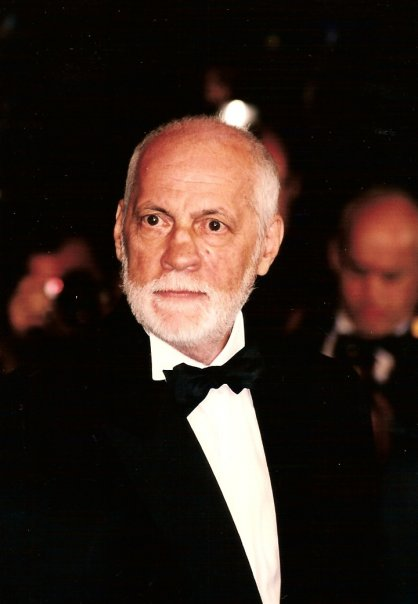
- Serrault at the 1997 Cannes Film Festival
- Born: Michel Lucien Serrault; 24 January 1928; Brunoy, France
- Died: 29 July 2007 (aged 79); Honfleur, France
- Occupation: actor
- Spouse: Juanita Saint-Peyron
- Awards: Full list

Michel Serrault (24 January 1928 – 29 July 2007) was a French stage and film actor who appeared from 1954 until 2007 in more than 130 films.

== Life and career ==
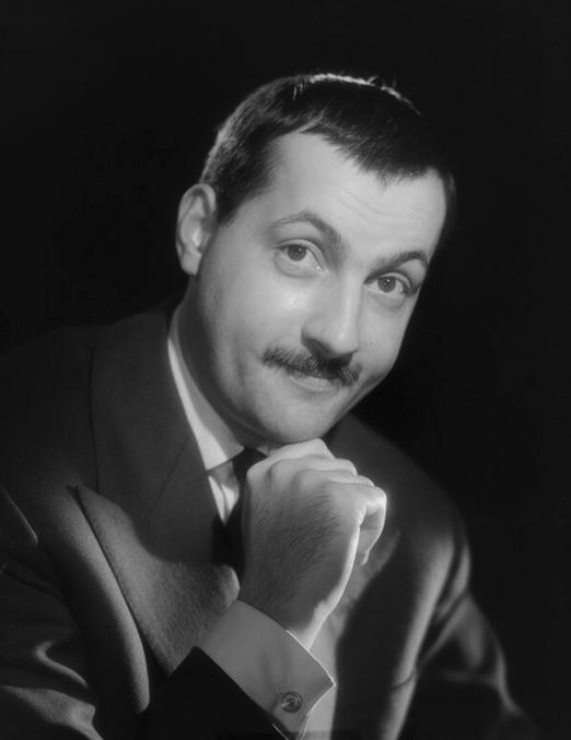
Michel Serrault (1955)

His first professional job was in a touring production in Germany of Molière's Les Fourberies de Scapin.

In 1948, he began his career in the theatre with Robert Dhéry in Les Branquignols. His first film was Ah! Les belles bacchantes, starring Dhéry, Colette Brosset (Dhéry's then-wife), and Louis de Funès; directed by Jean Loubignac in 1954. Serrault appeared in the 1955 suspense thriller Les diaboliques, starring Simone Signoret and directed by Henri-Georges Clouzot. Throughout the 1950s, Serrault gained popularity in his comedy double act with Jean Poiret.

From February 1973 through 1978, he portrayed the role of Albin/Zaza opposite Poiret in the play La cage aux folles, written by Poiret. He recreated the role for the film version of the play, which was released in 1978. In 1977-1978 he played the composer Jacques Offenbach in a six-part series of one-hour episodes about the musician's life, each one focusing on a specific aspect or work. The success of the film version of La Cage aux folles helped Serrault, who had been primarily known for his comedy roles, establish himself as a leading actor in French cinema, and eventually as a dramatic performer. He later appeared in sinister roles in Claude Miller's Garde à Vue (1981) and Deadly Circuit (1982), and Claude Chabrol's The Hatter's Ghost (1982).

Serrault died from relapsing polychondritis at his home in Équemauville on 29 July 2007 at age 79. He was buried in Sainte-Catherine's cemetery in Honfleur and was transferred in 2009 to the cemetery of Neuilly-sur-Seine near his wife Juanita Saint-Peyron and daughter Caroline, who died in 1977. He had another daughter, actress Nathalie Serrault.

== Theatre (partial) ==
- Knock
- L'Avare
- La cage aux folles
- Le tombeur
- Gugusse
- Pour avoir Adrienne
- Quand épousez-vous ma femme
- On purge bébé

== Filmography ==
Year	Title	Role	Director	Notes
1954	Ah ! les belles bacchantes	Michel Serrault, le trompettiste	Robert Dhéry	
1955	Les diaboliques ("Diabolique")	Monsieur Raymond, the teacher	Henri-Georges Clouzot	
1956	Cette sacrée gamine ("Mademoiselle Pigalle")	the second inspector	Michel Boisrond	
1956	La vie est belle	Le démarcheur	Roger Pierre	
1956	The Terror with Women	Un gendarme	Jean Boyer	
1956	Assassins et voleurs ("Murderers and Thieves")	Albert Le Cagneux, the burglar	Sacha Guitry	
1957	Adorables démons	Jacques Willis Senior	Maurice Cloche	
1957	Le Naïf aux quarante enfants ("The Innocent with Forty Children")	Jean-François Robignac, the new French teacher	Philippe Agostini	
1958	Clara et les Méchants	La Parole	Raoul André	
1959	Nina	Gérard Blonville	Jean Boyer	
1959	Oh! Qué mambo	Inspecteur Sapin	John Berry	
1959	Messieurs les ronds-de-cuir	Le conservateur du Musée / Son petit-fils	Henri Diamant-Berger	
1959	Vous n'avez rien à déclarer ?	Dr. Couzan	Clément Duhour	
1960	Love and the Frenchwoman	Danielle's lawyer	Various directors	(segment "Divorce, Le")
1960	Candide ou l'optimisme au XXe siècle ("Candide, or the Optimist of the Twentieth Century")	the second policeman	Norbert Carbonnaux	
1961	Ma femme est une panthère	Butcher	Raymond Bailly	
1961	La Belle Américaine ("The American Beauty")	Chauveau	Robert Dhéry	
1962	La gamberge ("The Dance")	Pétrarque	Norbert Carbonnaux	
1962	Le repos du guerrier ("Warrior's Rest")	Maître Varange	Roger Vadim	
1962	How to Succeed in Love	Le commissaire	Michel Boisrond	
1962	Un clair de lune à Maubeuge ("Moonlight in Maubeuge")	Monsieur Charpentier, the lecturer	Jean Chérasse	
1962	Les quatre vérités ("Three Fables of Love")	the Raven	Hervé Bromberger	(segment "Le corbeau et le renard")
1962	Nous irons à Deauville ("We Will Go to Deauville")	Lucien Moreau	Francis Rigaud	
1963	Carambolages ("Carom Shots")	Baudu, the investigating police inspector	Marcel Bluwal	
1963	Bebert das Arábias	Barthoin - l'inspecteur des transports	Yves Robert	
1964	How Do You Like My Sister?	Varangeot	Michel Boisrond	
1964	Des pissenlits par la racine ("Salad by the Roots")	Jérôme	Georges Lautner	
1964	Les Durs à cuire	Rossignol, private detective	Jack Pinoteau	
1964	Clémentine chérie	L'huissier	Pierre Chevalier	
1964	La chasse à l'homme	Gaston Lartois	Édouard Molinaro	
1964	Jealous as a Tiger	M. Lurot	Darry Cowl	
1965	Les baratineurs	Henri	Francis Rigaud	
1965	La bonne occase	Hutin	Michel Drach	
1965	Me and the Forty Year Old Man	Bénéchol	Jack Pinoteau	
1965	Cent briques et des tuiles ("How Not to Rob a Department Store")	Méloune	Pierre Grimblat	
1965	Le lit à deux places ("The Double Bed", episode "Un monsieur de passage")	Albert	François Dupont-Midi	
1965	La tête du client	Gaston Bérrien, alias "Monsieur Max"	Jacques Poitrenaud	
1965	When the Pheasants Pass	Ribero	Édouard Molinaro	
1965	Le Petit Monstre	Valet	Jean-Paul Sassy	
1966	Les Combinards	Le père de Lucile	Jean-Claude Roy	
1966	Le Caïd de Champignol	Hector	Jean Bastia	
1966	Le roi de cœur ("King of Hearts")	Marcel, the hairdresser	Philippe de Broca	
1966	King of Hearts	Monsieur Marcel	Philipe de Broca	
1967	Les compagnons de la marguerite	Inspector Papin	Jean-Pierre Mocky	
1967	Le grand bidule	Pounet	Raoul André	
1967	Du mou dans la gâchette	L'armurier	Louis Grospierre	
1967	Le fou du labo IV	Granger	Bernard Gérard	
1968	Ces messieurs de la famille	Gabriel Pelletier	Raoul André	
1968	À tout casser	Aldo Morelli	John Berry	
1969	Un merveilleux parfum d'oseille	Commissaire Le Gac	Rinaldo Bassi	
1969	Appelez-moi Mathilde	François	Pierre Mondy	
1970	Ces messieurs de la gâchette	Gabriel Pelletier	Raoul André	
1970	La liberté en croupe	Paul Cérès	Édouard Molinaro	
1971	Le Cri du cormoran, le soir au-dessus des jonques	Alfred Mullanet	Michel Audiard	
1971	Qu'est-ce qui fait courir les crocodiles?	Achille	Jacques Poitrenaud	
1972	Le Viager	Louis Martinet	Pierre Tchernia	
1972	Tout le monde il est beau, tout le monde il est gentil	Marcel Jolin	Jean Yanne	
1972	Un meurtre est un meurtre	Plouvier	Étienne Périer	
1973	Moi y'en a vouloir des sous	Léon	Jean Yanne	
1973	La belle affaire	Paul	Jacques Besnard	
1973	Le grand bazar ("The Big Store")	Félix Boucan	Claude Zidi	
1974	Les Gaspards ("The Holes")	Jean-Paul Rondin	Pierre Tchernia	
1974	Les Chinois à Paris ("Chinese in Paris")	Grégoire Montclair	Jean Yanne	
1974	La main à couper	Edouard Henricot	Étienne Périer	
1974	La Gueule de l'emploi	La dame au chapeau vert / L'antiquaire / L'aveugle / Le taxi moustachu / Inspecteur Robillon	Jacques Rouland	
1974	Un linceul n'a pas de poches ("No Pockets in a Shroud")	Justin Blesch	Jean-Pierre Mocky	
1975	C'est pas parce qu'on a rien à dire qu'il faut fermer sa gueule	Max	Jacques Besnard	
1975	L'Ibis rouge ("The Red Ibis")	Jérémie	Jean-Pierre Mocky	
1975	Opération Lady Marlène	Paulo	Robert Lamoureux	
1976	La situation est grave… mais pas désespérée	Jean-Pierre Mazard	Jacques Besnard	
1977	Le roi des bricoleurs	Bordin	Jean-Pierre Mocky	
1978	Préparez vos mouchoirs ("Get Out Your Handkerchiefs")	the neighbour	Bertrand Blier	
1978	L'argent des autres	Monsieur Miremont	Christian de Chalonge	
1978	La cage aux folles	Albin Mougeotte, alias "Zaza Napoli"	Édouard Molinaro	
1979	L'esprit de famille	Doctor Charles Moreau	Jean-Pierre Blanc	
1979	L'Associé ("The Associate")	Julien Pardot	René Gainville	
1979	La gueule de l'autre	Martial Perrin / Gilbert Brossard	Pierre Tchernia	
1979	Buffet froid	Le quidam / Man in the first scene	Bertrand Blier	cameo appearance
1980	Il lupo e l'agnello ("Le coucou")	Léon	Francesco Massaro	
1980	Pile ou Face ("Heads or Tails")	Édouard Morlaix	Robert Enrico	
1980	La Cage aux Folles II	Albin Mougeotte, alias "Zaza Napoli"	Edouard Molinaro	
1981	Malevil	Count Charles-Emile Emmanuel	Christian de Chalonge	
1981	Garde à vue	Jerome / Charles / Emile Martinaud	Claude Miller	
1982	Nestor Burma, détective de choc	Nestor Burma	Jean-Luc Miesch	
1982	Les fantômes du chapelier ("The Hatter's Ghost")	Léon Labbé, the "chapelier"	Claude Chabrol	
1982	Les quarantièmes rugissants ("The Roaring Forties")	Sébastien Barral	Christian de Chalonge	
1982	Deux heures moins le quart avant Jésus-Christ ("Quarter to Two Before Jesus Christ")	Julius Caesar	Jean Yanne	
1983	Mortelle randonnée ("Deadly Circuit")	privat detective "the eye" Beauvoir	Claude Miller	
1984	Le bon plaisir	Minister	Francis Girod	
1984	A mort l'arbitre ("Kill the Referee")	Rico	Jean-Pierre Mocky	
1984	Le bon roi Dagobert ("Good King Dagobert")	Otarius	Dino Risi	
1985	Les Rois du gag	Gaëtan / Robert Wellson	Claude Zidi	
1985	Liberté, égalité, choucroute	Louis XVI	Jean Yanne	
1985	On ne meurt que deux fois	Robert Staniland	Jacques Deray	
1985	La Cage aux Folles 3: The Wedding	Albin Mougeotte, alias "Zaza Napoli"	Georges Lautner	
1986	Mon beau-frère a tué ma sœur ("My Brother-in-Law Killed My Sister")	Octave Clapoteau	Jacques Rouffio	
1987	Le miraculé ("The Miracle")	Ronald Fox Terrier	Jean-Pierre Mocky	
1987	Ennemis intimes	Baudin	Denis Amar	
1988	En toute innocence	Paul Duchêne	Alain Jessua	
1988	Bonjour l'angoisse	Michaud	Pierre Tchernia	
1988	Ne réveillez pas un flic qui dort ("Let Sleeping Cops Lie")	Roger Scatti	José Pinheiro	
1989	Comédie d'amour	Paul Léautaud	Jean-Pierre Rawson	
1989	Buon natale, buonanno Luigi ("Merry Christmas... Happy New Year")	Gino	Luigi Comencini	
1990	Docteur Petiot	Doctor Marcel Petiot	Christian de Chalonge	
1991	La vieille qui marchait dans la mer ("The Old Lady Who Walked in the Sea")	Pompilius	Laurent Heynemann	
1992	Ville à vendre	Rousselot	Jean-Pierre Mocky	
1992	Room Service	Monsieur Luc	Georges Lautner	
1992	Vieille canaille	Darius Caunes	Gérard Jourd'hui	
1994	Bonsoir	Alex Ponttin	Jean-Pierre Mocky	
1995	Nelly et Monsieur Arnaud ("Nelly and Mr. Arnaud")	Monsieur Pierre Arnaud	Claude Sautet	
1995	Le bonheur est dans le pré ("Happiness Is in the Field")	Francis Bergeade	Étienne Chatiliez	
1996	Beaumarchais, l’insolent ("Beaumarchais")	Louis XV	Edouard Molinaro	
1997	Assassin(s)	Mr Wagner	Mathieu Kassovitz	
1997	Artemisia	Orazio Gentileschi	Agnès Merlet	
1997	Rien ne va plus ("The Swindle")	Victor	Claude Chabrol	
1997	Le comédien ("The Comedian")	The Comedian	Christian de Chalonge	
1999	Les enfants du marais ("The Children of the Marshland")	Pépé la Rainette	Jean Becker	
2000	Le monde de Marty	Antoine Berrant	Denis Bardiau	
2000	Le Libertin ("The Libertine")	the Cardinal	Gabriel Aghion	
2000	Les acteurs ("The Actors")	Himself	Bertrand Blier	
2001	Belphégor, le fantôme du Louvre ("Belphegor, Phantom of the Louvre")	Verlac	Jean-Paul Salomé	
2001	Une hirondelle a fait le printemps ("The Girl From Paris")	Adrien	Christian Carion	
2001	Vajont - La diga del disonore ("Vajont")	Carlo Semenza	Renzo Martinelli	
2002	24 heures de la vie d’une femme ("24 Hours in the Life of a Woman")	Louis	Laurent Bouhnik	
2002	Le papillon ("The Butterfly")	Julien	Philippe Muyl	
2003	Le furet	Anzio	Jean-Pierre Mocky	
2004	Albert est méchant	Albert Moulineau	Hervé Palud	
2004	Ne quittez pas!	Lucien Mandel	Arthur Joffé	Voice
2005	Joyeux Noël ("Merry Christmas")	the Lord of the castle	Christian Carion	
2005	Grabuge!	Inspector Lancret	Jean-Pierre Mocky	
2006	Les enfants du pays	Gustave	Pierre Javaux	
2006	Le bénévole	Max Birgos	Jean-Pierre Mocky	
2006	Monsieur Léon ("Grandpa's Secret", TV)	Monsieur Léon	Pierre Boutron	TV movie
2006	Antonio Vivaldi	the Doge of Venice	Jean-Louis Guillermou	
2007	Pars vite et reviens tard ("Have Mercy on Us All")	Hervé Decambrais / Hervé Ducouëdic	Régis Wargnier	

== Awards ==
Year	Award	Category	Film	Result
1979	César Award	Best Supporting Actor	L'argent des autres	Nominated
1979	César Award	Best Actor	La Cage aux Folles	Won
1979	David di Donatello Awards	Best Foreign Actor (Migliore attore straniero)	La Cage aux Folles	Won
1981	César Award	Best Actor	La Cage aux Folles II	Nominated
1982	César Award	Best Actor	Garde à Vue	Won
1984	César Award	Best Actor	Mortelle Randonnée	Nominated
1986	César Award	Best Actor	On ne meurt que deux fois	Nominated
1987	Molière Award	Best Actor	L'Avare	Nominated
1991	César Award	Best Actor	Docteur Petiot	Nominated
1993	Molière Award	Best Actor	Knock	Nominated
1996	Lumière Awards	Best Actor	Nelly et Monsieur Arnaud	Won
1996	César Award	Best Actor	Nelly et Monsieur Arnaud	Won
1998	Lumière Awards	Best Actor	Rien ne va plus	Won
2006	Prix du public des palmarès du Festival de la fiction TV de Saint-Tropez	Best actor	Monsieur Léon	Won
2008	Prix du public des palmarès du Festival de la fiction TV de La Rochelle 2008	Best actor	Monsieur Léon	Won
