= Auguste (film) =

1961 film

Kolka, My Friend
- Theatrical release poster
- Directed by: Pierre Chevalier
- Written by: Raymond Castans
- Starring: Fernand Raynaud; Valérie Lagrange; Jean Poiret; Roger Carel
- Cinematography: Marcel Grignon
- Edited by: Gabriel Rongier
- Music by: Franck Barcellini
- Production company: Les Films Marceau
- Distributed by: Cocinor
- Release date: 1961
- Running time: 90 minutes
- Country: France
- Language: French

Auguste or Kolka, My Friend is a 1961 French comedy film directed by Pierre Chevalier. It stars Fernand Raynaud, Valérie Lagrange and Jean Poiret.

== Cast ==
- Fernand Raynaud as Auguste Roussel
- Valérie Lagrange as Françoise
- Jean Poiret as Georges Flower
- Roger Carel as Albert, the stepbrother
- Pierre Palau as Boyer de l'Ain
- Paul Préboist as Dupont
- Simone Berthier as Auguste's servant
