= Edmond Richard (cinematographer) =

French cinematographer (1927–2018)

Edmond Richard (6 January 1927, Paris – 5 June 2018) was a French cinematographer.

== Selected works ==
- The Trial (1962)
- Chimes at Midnight (1965)
- Manon 70 (1968)
- The Discreet Charm of the Bourgeoisie (1972)
- The Phantom of Liberty (1974)
- That Obscure Object of Desire (1977)
- Les Misérables (1982) - for which he was nominated for a César Award
- Mayrig (1991)
- A Star for Two (1991)
- Bonsoir (1994)
