= L'albatros =

L'albatros may refer to:

- Albatross, a sea bird
- L'albatros, a poem by Charles Baudelaire
- L'Albatros, a 1971 French film released as Love Hate on its English release
