= Bonsoir =

- Movie Poster
- Directed by: Jean-Pierre Mocky
- Written by: André Ruellan (novel)
- Produced by: Jean-Pierre Mocky
- Starring: Michel Serrault; Claude Jade; Marie-Christine Barrault; Jean-Claude Dreyfus; Corinne Le Poulain; Jean-Pierre Bisson
- Cinematography: Edmond Richard
- Music by: Vladimir Cosma
- Distributed by: MC4 Productions
- Release date: 1994
- Running time: 85 min.
- Country: France
- Language: French
- Box office: $71.000

Bonsoir is a 1994 French film directed by Jean-Pierre Mocky.

== Plot ==
Having first lost his wife, then his job as a tweed tailor, Alex Ponttin (Michel Serrault) has devised a novel way to keep himself in touch with society. He admits himself into people's homes by pretending to be a relative or an official and persuading his victims to give him a night's free board. He finds at first a lunch with the horrible couple Dumont (Jean-Pierre Bisson and Maike Jansen), where a thief follows him for a robbery. Alex spent an evening in front of TV at Marie (Marie-Christine Barrault), mother of seven children. He runs from Marie to find an evening and a new bed at the home of charming but shy lesbian Caroline (Claude Jade) and her funny lover Gloria (Corinne Le Poulain). To save her inheritance, Caroline - accused for her homosexuality by her horrible sister Catherine (Laurence Vincendon) - tells her aunt Amélie (Monique Darpy) that Gloria is her secretary and Alex her lover. Alex has to present himself nude in Caroline's bed. He saves Caroline's inheritance. The police officers (Jean-Claude Dreyfus) investigating the case are so terminally stupid that Alex has little chance of being arrested.

As in many of Jean-Pierre Mocky's films, there is a strong anti-establishment, almost anarchist subtext. This is manifested in the way that the self-proclaimed moral figures (the police, the clergy, even the President of the Republic) are presented in this film, but also in the elevation of Alex Ponttin to the status of a public hero at the end of the film. Whilst society and state sink into a numbing inertia, bereft of integrity and humanity, it is left to the eccentrics, the outsiders like worried Caroline, who is attacked by her sister and her aunt because the secret of her homosexuality, to build a more cohesive society and a better world. Michel Serrault excels in this off-the-wall satirical comedy which makes a bizarre assessment of modern life. He plays an impish vagrant who uses his new-found freedom to improve the lives of his fellow man, by briefly insinuating himself into their lives. Bonsoir goes much further and suggests that whole of modern society, not only the police, is culpable of mediocrity and moral laxity. It takes an outsider like Alex Ponttin, free from the bonds of modern living, to point the way to a better future.

== Cast ==
- Michel Serrault as Alex Ponttin
- Claude Jade as Caroline Winberg
- Marie-Christine Barrault as Marie
- Corinne Le Poulain as Gloria
- Jean-Claude Dreyfus as Bruneau
- Jean-Pierre Bisson as Marcel Dumont
- Maike Jansen as Yvonne Dumont
- Laura Grandt as Greta
- Catherine Mouchet as Eugénie
- Serge Riaboukine as Father Bonfils
- Laurence Vincendon as Caroline's sister
- Monique Darpy as Caroline's aunt
- Dominique Zardi as Caroline's neighbour

== See also ==
- Cinema of France
- List of French language films
