= Véronique Nordey =

French actress (1939–2017)

Véronique Nordey (15 June 1939 – 29 November 2017) was a French actress. Her son, Stanislas Nordey, is the director of the Théâtre national de Strasbourg.

She trained under Tania Balachova, and made her first film, Sorcières de Salem, directed by Raymond Rouleau, as a teenager. She married the director Jean-Pierre Mocky, and they made several films together, but divorced after fourteen years. Their son Stanislas was born in 1966.

After her son's birth, Nordey did not appear again in films until 2004, though she did continue her stage career after a break, and appeared on television a few times during the 1970s. When Stanislas had become a well-known director, she appeared in several of his productions.

Nordey was born in Paris and died in Lyon, aged 78, of cancer.

== Films ==
- Un drôle de paroissien
- Un couple
- Snobs
- Les Dragueurs
- La Cité de l’indicible peur
