= Jean-Claude Romer =

French actor and film critic (1933–2021)

Jean-Claude Romer (Paris, 19 January 1933 – 8 May 2021) was a French actor, film critic, and film historian.
