= Dominique Zardi =

French actor (1930–2009)

- Born: Emile Jean Cohen-Zardi; 2 March 1930; Paris, France
- Died: 13 December 2009 (aged 79); Paris, France
- Occupation: Actor
- Years active: 1942–2009
- Notable work: Fantômas (with Louis de Funès and Jean Marais)
- Relatives: Agnès Jaoui (first cousin once removed)

Dominique Zardi (born Emile Jean Cohen-Zardi; 2 March 1930 – 13 December 2009) was a French actor from Paris. He acted in more than 600 feature films, including Fantômas with Louis De Funès and Jean Marais. He died of cancer at the age of 79. He was the first cousin once removed of actress and film director Agnès Jaoui.

== Filmography ==
| Year | Title | Role | Notes |
|---|---|---|---|
| 1959 | Eyes of Love | Un badaud à la gare | |
| 1960 | Le Trou | A prisoner | |
| 1961 | A Woman Is a Woman | | |
| 1961 | Paris Blues | | |
| 1962 | Arsène Lupin Versus Arsène Lupin | | |
| 1962 | Bluebeard | | |
| 1963 | The Bamboo Stroke | | |
| 1964 | Faites sauter la banque! | Zapato | |
| 1964 | Fantômas | | |
| 1965 | The Sleeping Car Murders | | |
| 1965 | Pierrot le Fou | | |
| 1965 | Le gendarme à New York | An Italian gendarme | |
| 1968 | The Unfaithful Wife | | |
| 1968 | Les Biches | | |
| 1968 | Le gendarme se marie | | |
| 1969 | This Man Must Die | | |
| 1970 | Le gendarme en balade | | |
| 1970 | Jo | | |
| 1970 | The Things of Life | | |
| 1971 | Le Cinéma de papa | An actor | |
| 1971 | Max et les Ferrailleurs | Baraduch | |
| 1971 | Just Before Nightfall | | |
| 1972 | Dr. Popaul | | |
| 1974 | Un linceul n'a pas de poches | | |
| 1976 | Bartleby | | |
| 1978 | Violette Nozière | | |
| 1980 | Mais qu'est ce que j'ai fait au bon dieu pour avoir une femme qui boit dans les cafés avec les hommes ? | Auguste | |
| 1981 | Strange Affair | | |
| 1982 | Les Misérables | Chenildieu | |
| 1985 | Chicken with Vinegar | | |
| 1987 | Agent trouble | | |
| 1987 | The Miracle | | |
| 1988 | Une nuit à l'Assemblée Nationale | Fricasset | |
| 1991 | Madame Bovary | | |
| 1991 | Delicatessen | Taxi driver | |
| 1994 | Bonsoir | | |
