= Lucky Luke – The Complete Collection =

2019 collection of Lucky Luke comics

- Volume 1 book cover

Publication information
- Publisher: Cinebook
- Format: Hardcover; Digital comic
- Genre: Western fiction Historical fiction Humor
- Publication date: June 26, 2019
- No. of issues: 5 to date
- Main character(s): Lucky Luke; Jolly Jumper; Rantanplan; The Dalton Brothers

Creative team
- Written by: Morris; René Goscinny
- Artist: Morris

Lucky Luke – The Complete Collection is a series of books collecting the complete output of the Belgian comic title Lucky Luke, a comic title that was first published and introduced in the Belgian magazine Spirou during the late 1940s, and later continuing in Pilote before finally switching back to Spirou and being collected in the album format. The comic title was created by Morris in 1949, and later also written by René Goscinny. The publisher behind this reprint book collection is Cinebook Ltd. The first volume of the series was released in June 2019.

== Background ==
Jerome Saincantin of Cinebook stated in an interview in April 2019 that they would release a complete hardcover collection of Lucky Luke.

Seventy years after the Lucky Luke series original debut in French language version of the magazine Spirou in 1949, the first volume of the first-ever hardcover book collection of Lucky Luke translated to the english language was released in late June 2019 by the U.K. publishing company Cinebook Ltd. Before this hardcover collection series, Cinebook had since 2006 until this hardcover collection's debut published about seventy translated Lucky Luke softcover albums, each one featuring a single Lucky Luke album (bande dessinée).

The Cinebook hardcover collection is very similar to the editions of the French collection Lucky Luke - L'Integrale, the original model of the collection series and it's later translated collections., a joint venture by the company Lucky Productions and the French publisher Dargaud.

Other translated versions of this work are:

- Lucky Luke - Nouvelle Intégrale — a Belgian series published by Dupuis since 2016.
- Lucky Luke - Samling — a Swedish equivalent from the publisher Albumförlaget, a series published since 2017.

== Format ==
The books of this series measure 8.5 inches × 11.3 inches (217 mm × 287 mm), are of the hardcover kind and are printed in full color. The paper stock used in the volumes is of thick, matte quality. The binding type used for the volumes is sewn binding.

The volumes are published in chronological order and the stories featured in them are arranged in chronological order as well. Each hardcover volume contains several of the original standalone bande dessinée albums. The original French album covers are showcased before each album reprint together with the first publication date and place for each original album story in the collected volumes and each album story is ended with the original corresponding album back cover as well.

The extras include a thorough introduction written by Christelle and Bertand Pissavy-Yvernualt contains biographical material about the writers, photos of material related to the Lucky Luke comic, facts about the comic's characters, and information about the work and the people behind this collected edition itself, which in total amounts to about 50 pages of extras per volume.

In the earliest volumes, the readers are able to follow the style evolution of the comic from cartoon style to a more realistic drawing style of the characters and environments. Volumes of the series are sold separately and the MSRP per hardcover volume is set at $29.99 or £24.99, the collection is also available as a digital comic.

== Volumes ==
Volumes
Volume	Release date	Title	Original publication years	Collected albums	Artist	Writer	Page count	ISBN
1	2019-06-27	Lucky Luke - The Complete Collection Vol. 1	1949–1951	Dick Digger's Gold Mine, Rodeo, Arizona	Morris	Morris	216	978-1-84918-454-0
2	2019-08-01	Lucky Luke - The Complete Collection Vol. 2	1952–1954	Under a Western Sky, Lucky Luke versus Pat Poker, Outlaws	Morris	Morris	216	978-1-84918-455-7
3	2019-10-17	Lucky Luke - The Complete Collection Vol. 3	1955–1956	Doc Doxey's Elixir, Phil Wire, Rails on the Prairie	Morris	Morris & René Goscinny	216	978-1-84918-359-8
4	2022-02-01	Lucky Luke - The Complete Collection Vol. 4	1956-1957	The Bluefeet are Coming!, Lucky Luke vs Joss Jamon, The Dalton Cousins	Morris	Morris & René Goscinny	144	978-1-80044-047-0
5	2022-02-01	Lucky Luke - The Complete Collection Vol. 5	1957–1959	The Judge, The Oklahoma Land Rush, The Daltons' Escape	Morris	Morris & René Goscinny	144	978-1-80044-048-7
6	2026-01-08	Lucky Luke - The Complete Collection Vol. 6	1959-1960	Steaming Up the Mississippi, On the Daltons' Trail, In the Shadow of the Derricks	Morris	Morris & René Goscinny	216	978-1-80044-171-2
