= Los Hermanos Dalton =

Spanish pop-rock indie band

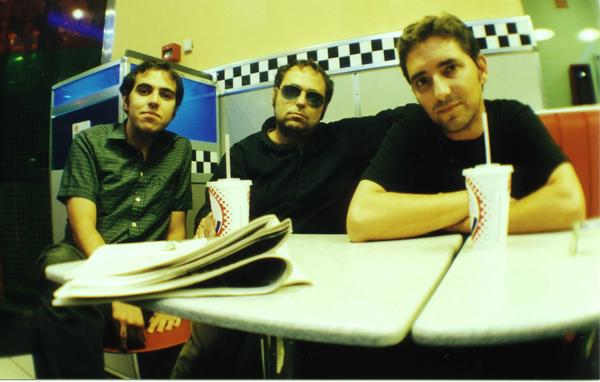
Los Hermanos Dalton (The Dalton Brothers) from left to right, Jesús, Josema and Carlos

Los Hermanos Dalton is a Spanish pop-rock indie band from San Fernando, Cadiz. The name comes from the Lucky Luke's characters, The Dalton's brothers.

== Discography ==
- Luces de Hollywood (MiniLP Covers). Mad Man Records, 1991.
- Ya están aquí. Dro, 1992.
- Nada suena igual (MiniLP). Dro East West, 1994.
- Vitamina D. Dro East West, 1996.
- Crash. Dro East West, 1998.
- Una noche más (en directo). Dro East West, 2000.
- Esperando una señal, Mad Man Records 2009.

== Singles ==
- Los latidos de siempre. Dro East West, 1993.
- El crimen del siglo. Dro East West, 1993.
- El mejor lugar. Dro East West, 1993.
- Nada suena igual. Dro East West, 1994.
- Pink Panter. Dro East West, 1994.
- Canciones Animadas. Dro East West, 1995.
- Provitamina D. Dro East West, 1996.
- Qué gran día. Dro East West, 1996.
- Fred Flintstone. Dro East West, 1996.
- Sin moverte del sillón. Dro East West, 1996.
- Perdiendo el tiempo. Dro East West, 1998.
- Espejos que no devuelven las miradas. Dro East West, 1999.
- Mucho mejor. Dro East West, 2000.
