= Lucky Luke (1991 film) =

Italian-American Western-comedy

- Film poster
- Directed by: Terence Hill
- Written by: Terence Hill; Carl Sautter; Lori Hill
- Based on: Lucky Luke by Morris and René Goscinny
- Produced by: Lucio Bompani
- Starring: Terence Hill; Nancy Morgan; Roger Miller; Fritz Sperberg; Dominic Barto; Bo Greigh; Ron Carey; Arsenio Trinidad; Mark Hardwick; Neil Summers; Buff Douthitt
- Cinematography: Carlo Tafani; Gianfranco Transunto
- Edited by: Eugenio Alabiso
- Music by: Aaron Schroeder; David Grover
- Distributed by: Paloma Films; Reteitalia
- Release date: 1991
- Running time: 92 minutes
- Countries: Italy; United States
- Languages: Italian; German

Lucky Luke is a 1991 Italian-American Western comedy film directed by and starring Terence Hill and based on the Belgian comic book of the same name. It is also the pilot episode of the Lucky Luke television series. It was shot in Bonanza Creek Ranch and Santa Fe (New Mexico), Zia Pueblo, Valles Caldera National Preserve, White Sands National Monument and La Junta (Colorado), and Tucson, Arizona.

== Plot ==
Lucky Luke becomes the sheriff of Daisy Town and runs out all the criminals. Then the Dalton brothers arrive and try to get the Indians to break the peace treaty and attack the town.

== Cast ==
- Terence Hill as Lucky Luke
- Nancy Morgan as Lotta Legs
- Roger Miller as Jolly Jumper (voice)
- Fritz Sperberg as Averell Dalton
- Dominic Barto as William Dalton
- Bo Greigh as Jack Dalton
- Ron Carey as Joe Dalton
- Arsenio Trinidad as Ming Li Fu
- Neil Summers as Virgil
- Mark Hardwick as Hank
- Buff Douthitt as the mayor

== Soundtrack ==
The opening theme of the movie is the song "Lucky Luke Rides Again", performed by Roger Miller. The main theme is the song "The Lonesomest Cowboy in the West", performed by Arlo Guthrie.

== Reception ==
CineMagazine rated the film 2 stars.
