= Achdé =

French comic book writer and artist (born 1961)

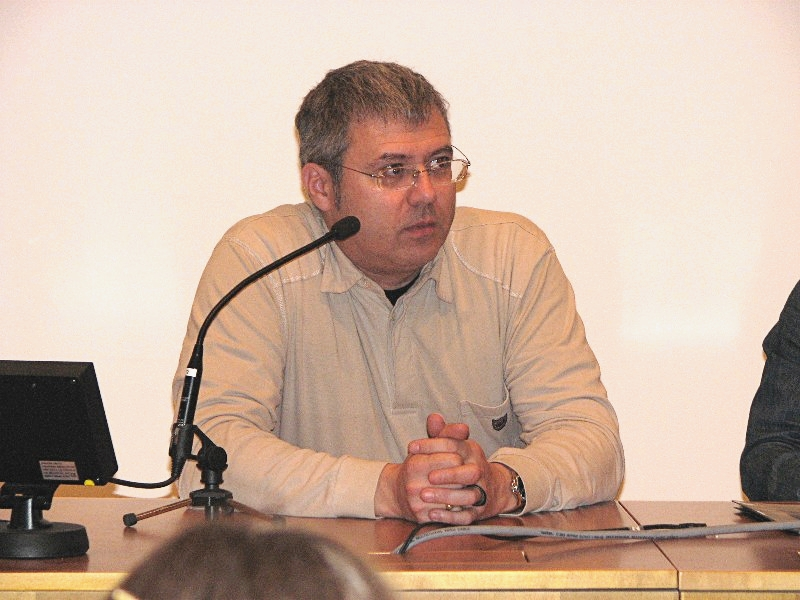
- Achdé at the comic festival in Tampere Finland 31 March 2007
- Born: Hervé Darmenton; 30 July 1961 (age 65) Lyon, France
- Areas: Writer, Artist
- Notable works: CRS=Détresse; Les Damnés de la route Lucky Luke

Achdé (French: [aʃde]), the pseudonym of Hervé Darmenton ([daʁmɑ̃tɔ̃]; born July 30, 1961), is a French comic book writer and artist. The pseudonym is based on the French pronunciation of his initials, "H.D." (similar to Hergé and Jijé). After the death of Morris, the creator of Lucky Luke, Achdé continued the task of drawing new Lucky Luke stories from 2003 onwards.

== Career ==
Before dedicating himself to his craft, Achdé worked as a doctor with a specialty in radiology, but abandoned a career in medicine in 1985 to dedicate himself fully to drawing. He began illustrating newspapers and self-published Destins Croisés, his first comic book, in 1988. He joined the French publishing house Dargaud in 1991 and created several new series, alone and in partnership, including Fort Braillard, Woker (which concerns an interplanetary Tarzan), and Doc Véto. In 1993, he launched the series CRS=Détresse, CRS being a reference to the Compagnies Républicaines de Sécurité, the French security forces attached to the national police force, who are deployed during riots and demonstrations.

Following the death of Morris, Achdé was given the assignment to carry on the Lucky Luke series in collaboration with writer Laurent Gerra, and has stated, "For me it's been a childhood dream; when I was little, Lucky Luke was my favorite hero, and when I was young I knew I wanted to be a cartoonist."
