= List of Lucky Luke comics albums =

This is a list of Belgian comics albums featuring the character Lucky Luke, written and drawn by Morris.

== La Mine d'or de Dick Digger ==
La Mine d'or de Dick Digger contains two stories published in Le Journal de Spirou in 1947: namely "La Mine d'or de Dick Digger" and "Le Sosie de Lucky Luke". They were published as the first Lucky Luke hardcover collection in 1949, and in English by Cinebook in 2014 as Dick Digger's Gold Mine.

=== "La Mine d'or de Dick Digger" ===
Lucky Luke and his faithful horse, Jolly Jumper, reunite with an old friend: prospector Dick Digger, who is overjoyed after discovering a rich gold vein in the West Hills. On his way to Nugget City to register his claim, Digger hides his map in a rum bottle.

While celebrating at a saloon, Digger attracts the attention of two criminals who decide to rob him. That night, sleeping in a room above the saloon, he is attacked by the bandits, who steal his gold and his map. Digger tries to fight back, is hit on the head and loses his memory.

The following day, Luke and Jolly Jumper pursue the thieves. Luke tracks them down and steals the bottle with the map. The bandits give chase, and reclaim the bottle; however, Luke has replaced the map with a fake one which leads them into a trap.

With the help of the Nugget City sheriff, Luke captures the criminals. During an encounter with the gang’s leader, Dick Digger regains his memory. Reunited with his family, he sets off to dig for gold and claim his fortune.

=== "Le Sosie de Lucky Luke" ===
Luke discovers that the residents of a town fear him due to his resemblance to Mad Jim, a notorious outlaw who is imprisoned and awaiting execution. Two criminals ambush Luke, knock him out and swap him with Mad Jim, placing him in a drunken sheriff’s jail cell. Their goal is to free Mad Jim and claim a share of his hidden loot.

When Luke regains consciousness, he vainly tries to convince the sheriff of his true identity. His execution is botched, giving him time to escape. Determined to bring Mad Jim and accomplices Stan Strangler and Charley Chick to justice, he sets off in pursuit.

Luke captures the criminals, but they escape with the help of two Native Americans who are offended by Luke’s attempt to give them a harmonica and take him prisoner. When a dispute breaks out between them, Luke escapes and recaptures the outlaws.

Mad Jim again escapes, leading to a showdown in the local saloon. Luke uncharacteristically has no choice but to shoot and kill Mad Jim. He never again takes a life, relying on his sharpshooting skills to disarm his opponents.

== Rodéo ==
Rodéo contains three stories published in Spirou in 1948–49: "Grand rodéo" ("Grand Rodeo"), "Lucky Luke à Desperado City" ("Lucky Luke in Desperado City") and "La ruée vers l'or de Buffalo Creek" ("The Buffalo Creek Gold Rush"). They were published as the second Lucky Luke hardcover album in 1951, and in English by Cinebook as the 54th in 2015.

=== "Grand Rodéo" ===
Luke arrives in Navajo City as it prepares to host a rodeo. In the local saloon he encounters Cactus Kid, who picks a fight with him but is quickly overpowered.

The rodeo is the next day, and Cactus Kid is favored to win. Realizing that Lucky Luke is a serious contender, he resorts to cheating. He sabotages Luke’s lasso, and tries to cut his saddle girth. Luke catches him in the act, and beats him. He win the rodeo, but Cactus Kid steals the prize money and makes a run for it; Luke tracks him down and captures him.

=== "Lucky Luke à Desperado City" ===
Luke arrives in Desperado City, where the Pistol Brothers seem to be terrorizing its residents. They confront Luke, who captures them during a stagecoach attack. The town is full of bandits, however, and Luke is attacked from every direction. The undertaker is boss of the bandits, who free the Pistol Brothers and capture Luke. Luke is saved from hanging by a panicked herd of cattle, neutralizes the undertaker and the Pistol Brothers, and renames the town "Justice City".

=== "La ruée vers l'or de Buffalo Creek" ===
Luke sees a sleeping prospector and plays a practical joke on him, planting a gold nugget in his pan. The prospector awakes to his dream come true and, when Luke tries to admit his joke, shoots at him. A gold rush follows, and Luke is arrested when he tries to explain the truth. An expert examines the gold nugget, and says that it was discovered in California fifty years earlier. Buffalo Creek then becomes a ghost town.

== Arizona ==
Arizona, the series' third album, was published by Dupuis in 1951 and in English by Cinebook in 2015. It contains two stories: "Arizona 1880" and "Lucky Luke contre Cigarette Cæsar".

=== "Arizona 1880" ===
Two bandits attack a stagecoach, and Luke sets out on their trail. In the Nugget City saloon he faces Big Belly, a tough guy who cheats at cards. Big Belly runs away, leaving a spur which indicates that he is probably one of the stagecoach's attackers. Luke follows him, and arrives at a hut guarded by a Mexican sentinel. He neutralizes him and attacks the two men (including Big Belly) who held the stagecoach up. The two bandits defeat Luke and take him prisoner. Cheat, who appears to be the chief, betrays Big Belly and his Mexican accomplice and flees after tying them up. With Jolly Jumper's help, Luke escapes and captures Cheat.

=== "Lucky Luke contre Cigarette Cæsar" ===
Lucky Luke pursues Cigarette Cæsar, who has escaped from prison and crossed the Mexican border. Cigarette Cæsar is charged with armed robbery and murder. The bandit struggles to get rid of his pursuer, who manages to find him. He arms himself and finds an accomplice, a Mexican knife thrower who puts a message signed by Cigarette Cæsar on the door of Luke's room to meet the next day at 5 a.m. in the plaza. Luke goes to the plaza, where bullfights take place. The bullfighters are incompetent, and Luke also enters the arena. Cigarette Cæsar shoots him in the back, but Luke had made a bulletproof vest. Luke captures Cæsar and brings him back to the American border.

== Sous le ciel de l'Ouest ==
Sous le ciel de l'Ouest, the series' fourth album, was published by Dupuis in 1952 and in English by Cinebook in 2015 as Under a Western Sky. It contains three stories: "Le Retour de Joe la Gachette" ("The Return of Joe the Trigger"), "Jours de round–up" ("Round-up days"), and "Le Grand combat" ("The Great Fight").

=== "Le Retour de Joe la Gachette" ===
Luke meets a man calling himself John the Philanthropist. When he arrives in town, he hears about a horse race with $5,000 in prize money. Luke enters Jolly Jumper, who is stolen on race day. During the race, John the Philanthropist passes one competitor after another; it is raining, and John's black horse is Jolly Jumper painted black. Luke chases John, who has fled with the race bets. He catches him and has him shaved by the barber, who reveals him as bandit Joe the Trigger.

=== "Jours de round-up" ===
Arriving near a ranch, Lucky Luke hears about a round-up. When the entire herd is captured, the owner of the "-3" brand ranch is missing 200 head of cattle. Luke investigates, and learns that two bandits stole the cattle and changed their brands to "4B". He stops them, and the missing cattle are returned to the ranch.

=== "Le Grand combat" ===
A strong, illiterate man escapes from a bull and meets Luke, who offers to enter him in a boxing match against Killer Kelly. The challenger, whom Luke calls "Battling Belden", trains hard for the match. Slippery Nelson, a dishonest bookmaker, wants to make Belden lose the match by kidnapping his fiancée Rosita. Luke finds her and brings her back to Belden, who wins the match and the $10,000 prize; Nelson goes to jail.

== Lucky Luke contre Pat Poker ==
Lucky Luke contre Pat Poker, the series' fifth album, was published by Dupuis in 1953 and Cinebook in English in 2013 as Lucky Luke versus Pat Poker. It contains two Pat Poker stories: "Nettoyage à Red City" ("Cleanup in Red City") and "Tumulte à Tumbleweed" ("Tumult in Tumbleweed").

=== "Nettoyage à Red City" ===
Luke, sheriff of Red City, is not at his best when he arrives. Shortly before, he had his clothes and Jolly Jumper stolen while swimming in a river and must ride in the stagecoach in the clothes of a 10-year-old. Red City is dominated by Pat Poker, a dishonest card player who leads a gang of outlaws. They receive Luke like a kid, offering him a sheriff's badge, a toy gun and a small wooden horse. A skunk prevents a citizen from being hanged by Pat Poker's men. Luke finds Jolly Jumper (who has been stolen by Pat Poker), and wins him back in a card game; Poker advises him to leave before sunset. Luke returns at night, hidden in a cart of hay. He captures two of Pat Poker's men as they rob the bank, and tackles Pat Poker in his saloon. Poker escapes with help from the undertaker, but Luke catches him.

=== "Tumulte à Tumbleweed" ===
Luke arrives in Tumbleweed after a rough ride. He is well-received at the local saloon until Angelface, a tough guy who hates foreigners, shepherds and sheep, threatens him if he does not leave. Angelface is distracted by the arrival of a dog, which heralds the arrival of a shepherd. He follows the dog, who leads him to a shepherd and a flock of sheep. Luke keeps Angelface from hanging the shepherd, who quickly leaves with his sheep.

Pat Poker, recently released from prison, arrives in Tumbleweed and takes over the town. He is frightened when he sees Luke, and tries to trap him. Luke, with no arrest warrant, lets him go. Angelface allies himself with Pat Poker, who pays him to kill Luke. Pat Poker invites Luke to a card game, when Angelface will shoot him through his hotel-room window, but Luke distracts Angelface and sabotages his rifle.

A sheriff arrives in Tumbleweed to catch Pat Poker, and is beaten up by Angelface. Luke finds an arrest warrant for Pat Poker, takes the place of the sheriff and whips Angelface. Pat Poker flees, but Luke captures him.

== Hors-la-loi ==
Hors-la-loi, the series' sixth album, was published by Dupuis in 1954 and by Cinebook in English in 2014 as Outlaws. It is the first Lucky Luke story which is loosely based on historical events in the Old West. In it, Luke is pitted against a fictionalized version of the Dalton brothers.

The four brothers (Bob, Grant, Bill and Emmet Dalton) are introduced. Their first bank attack, in 1889 in El Reno, Oklahoma, began their criminal careers and was followed by a stagecoach attack. The Daltons' growing reputation worries the government, which sends Luke to stop them. Money is transported on a train. Luke later meets the bandits in a saloon and presents them with a show of force, but they escape. The Daltons continue their misdeeds, forcing them to remain on guard. They find Lucky Luke in a saloon and flee, unsuccessfully trying to have cosmetic surgery. Believing that Luke is gone for good, they decide to attack Coffeyville on October 5, 1892, at 9:00 a.m. Luke ambushes them in front of the bank, and they are imprisoned and hanged.

== L'Élixir du Dr Doxey ==
L'Élixir du Dr Doxey, the seventh title in the original series, was published by Dupuis in 1955 and by Cinebook in English in 2012 as Doc Doxey's Elixir. The album, about quackery, has two Doc Doxey stories: "Lucky Luke et le Docteur Doxey" ("Lucky Luke and Doctor Doxey") and "Chasse à l'homme" ("Manhunt").

=== "Lucky Luke et le Docteur Doxey" ===
Doctor Doxey is an unscrupulous charlatan who will do anything to sell his worthless elixir. With the help of his henchman, Scraggy, he tries to persuade people in the cities he visits that his medicine cures everything. Scraggy disguises himself as a helpless old man or a disabled old woman, swallows the elixir, and begins to frolic and jump like a 20-year-old. Doxey poisons a village's water to make its inhabitants sick so he can cure them with his elixir, and kidnaps a sheriff who wanted to stop him. When Doxey and Scraggy meet Luke, they steal Jolly Jumper. Luke decides to trap Doxey, publishing a newspaper article saying that the sheriff had $5,000 when he disappeared. Doxey and Scraggy go to the cabin where they put the sheriff, and Luke follows and catches them.

=== "Chasse à l'homme" ===
Doctor Doxey escapes from prison, and Luke sets off in pursuit. After a rough desert crossing during which he loses his horse, Doxey arrives in Coyoteville. After quenching his thirst (with a keg of beer), he shaves his beard to disguise himself; Luke does not recognize him. Doxey resumes his quack trade as Doctor Oxide in front of Luke, who still does not recognize him. When a child draws a beard on Doxey's poster, however, Luke immediately makes the connection. He goes to arrest Doxey, who escapes thanks to an explosive. Momentarily rid of Luke, Doxey unsuccessfully tries to sell his elixir in La Siesta. In the neighboring village, Luke catches him.

== Phil Defer ==
Phil Defer, the eighth title in the original series, was published by Dupuis in 1956 and in English by Cinebook in 2013 as Phil Wire. The album contains two stories: "Lucky Luke contre Phil Defer 'the Faucheux'" ("Lucky Luke versus Phil Wire 'The Spider'") and "Lucky Luke et Pilule" ("Lucky Luke and Pill").

=== "Lucky Luke contre Phil Defer" ===
In the town of Bottleneck Gulch, the only saloon for miles around is the Ace of Spades. It belongs to a crook named O'Sullivan, who sells adulterated whiskey. The Ace of Spades does a good business, however, thanks to thirsty cowboys passing by.

A man named O'Hara opens another saloon, the Ace of Hearts. Failing to take over his rival and on the verge of bankruptcy, O'Sullivan hires professional hitman Phil Wire to get rid of O'Hara. Lucky Luke, a friend of O'Hara, impersonates Phil and he and O'Hara pretend that he is dead. As O'Sullivan prepares to leave, the real Phil Wire arrives and they try to get rid of Luke and O'Hara. Phil provokes Luke into a duel which Luke wins, shooting Phil in the shoulder and ending his career as a hitman. O'Sullivan is chased away; O'Hara merges his rival's saloon with his own as the 2 Aces Saloon, with the longest bar in the west.

=== "Lucky Luke et Pilule" ===
Luke tells the other cowboys a story about a little man, nicknamed Pill (because he regularly takes pills), who looked like a weed from a big city. He arrives in Smokey Town, a city full of criminals and revolver fights. After contributing (involuntarily) to the arrest of a bandit, Pill is named sheriff and must stop all the criminals. His clumsiness and myopia (after losing his glasses) help Pill to kill the criminals after his pill box stops a bullet.

== Des rails sur la Prairie ==
Des rails sur la Prairie, written by Goscinny and Morris, is the ninth album in the series and Goscinny's first. It is the first in which Luke, heading towards the setting sun in the last panel, sings "I'm a Poor Lonesome Cowboy". The album was published by Dupuis in 1957 and in English by Cinebook in 2011 as Rails on the Prairie. Luke protects construction of the western railway from a crooked stagecoach shareholder, who sees the end of his business in the train's arrival.

== Alerte aux Pieds Bleus ==
Alerte aux Pieds Bleus, the tenth title in the original series, was published by Dupuis in 1958 and by Cinebook in English as The Bluefeet are coming!. It was Morris' only solo story after beginning his collaboration with René Goscinny.

Convinced that they will find firewater among the palefaces, Bluefoot Indians besiege the town. In Rattlesnake Valley, Arizona, Pedro Cucaracha is defrauding the locals at poker. Luke, who had stopped there, catches him playing against Sheriff Jerry Grindstone and drives him away. Pedro appeals to the Bluefeet, in return for alcohol. They besiege the city before being defeated by the cavalry.

== Lucky Luke contre Joss Jamon ==
Lucky Luke contre Joss Jamon, written by Goscinny and Morris, is the eleventh album in the series and the second on which Goscinny worked. The comic was printed by Dupuis in 1958 and in English by Cinebook in 2011, under the title Lucky Luke versus Joss Jamon.

Joss Jamon and his gang plunder the town of Los Palitos while having Lucky Luke hanged. Nevertheless, the latter manages to obtain freedom in return for catching the bandits and bringing them back to Los Palitos; he promises to come back to be hanged if he fails.

Jamon and his gang arrive at Frontier City. There, they gradually take ownership of all the establishments of the city starting with the bank by threats. In the same way, Jamon manages to be elected mayor of the city and appoints his acolytes to key positions.

Nevertheless, Luke opposes Joss and his gang and does everything to make their lives difficult. He is captured and sentenced to hanging after a rigged trial.

Finally, the inhabitants rebel against Joss and his accomplices. They free Lucky Luke and fight the bandits entrenched in the saloon. Making them believe that the Army is here, they surrender. Joss Jamon tries to escape the city. Lucky Luke catches him in the desert and he delivers him with his accomplices to Los Palitos just when as deadline expires.

== Les Cousins Dalton ==
Les Cousins Dalton, written by Goscinny and Morris is the twelfth book in the series. The comic was printed by Dupuis in 1958 and by Cinebook in 2011 as The Dalton Cousins. This album is the first of many Lucky Luke albums to feature the brothers Joe, William, Jack and Averell Dalton as significant characters (they appear briefly in the previous album Lucky Luke contre Joss Jamon as part of the jury set out to convict Lucky Luke). Within the Lucky Luke universe, they are cousins of the real-life Dalton Gang. (The "real" Daltons appeared in, and were killed off, in the earlier album Hors-la-loi.) As the story begins, the Dalton cousins are rather inept outlaws who aspire to become as notorious as their cousins, and vow to get even with Lucky Luke, the man responsible for their cousins' demise.

Joe, William, Jack and Averell Dalton, the cousins of the authentic Dalton Brothers, dream of avenging the dead by killing Lucky Luke and becoming desperados as famous as their famous cousins. As they are bad as bandits, they follow an intensive training and become dreaded outlaws.

The Daltons turn to their vendetta against Lucky Luke, whom they find at Killer Gulch. The latter fools them when they play cards that the winner will have the pleasure of killing the cowboy: Luke provides them with cards (which only has aces) and the four brothers each have four aces. They start fighting each other, each believing that another is cheating. Luke meanwhile escapes. Then they go in pursuit of Luke before understanding that the latter is still in the town of Killer Gulch. To get him out, they blockade the city, preventing anyone from entering or exiting, and Luke agrees to a fight. Luke fights each Dalton with his bare hands and beats them one after the other. Impressed, the Daltons offer to Lucky Luke to become their accomplice. Luke apparently agrees and arranges to prevent the Daltons from committing crimes.

When the Daltons understand that they have been deceived, they separate and leave each other on their own to find Lucky Luke. Thus, Luke confronts and captures each Dalton one by one (going from Averell, the first to find him, to ending with Joe) and the four brothers go to jail.

== Le Juge ==
Le Juge, written by Goscinny and Morris, is the thirteenth album in the series. The comic was printed by Dupuis in 1959 and by Cinebook in 2010 as The Judge. The story is inspired by the historical Justice of the peace Roy Bean. As usual, Lucky Luke does not interfere unless injustice is done, or one party acquires an unfair advantage over the other. Siding with Bean takes place only for that reason, to the level that things are fair game again. The unsung side-kick of the Judge is Jacinto, a diminutive Mexican, who lightens up several details of the story.

While driving a.herd to Pecos, Luke is arrested by pseudo-judge Roy Bean, aided by his bear Joe.

Judge Roy Bean uses an old outdated Civil Code to apply the law in his own way. He gives everyone fines for stupid reasons (for example, he sentenced a Mexican named Jacinto to a month of forced labor simply because he had shaded him by the way). He also encourages people to make bets on the outcome, before confiscating the bets saying that betting and gambling are prohibited by law.

After a mock trial, the judge confiscates the cattle from Luke. The latter escapes and decides to ally himself with Bad Ticket, a man who also settles as a judge in Langtry. A war begins between the two judges and Luke decides to decide between them during a game of poker. Finally, Roy Bean capitulates after a game fraught with cheating and leaves Langtry.

However, Bad Ticket is even worse than Roy Bean and decides to hang Lucky Luke who only escapes with the help of Joe the bear. Finally, Luke, Roy Bean and Joe decide to team up against Bad Ticket. The latter locks them up. The prisoners manage nevertheless to escape, not without flooding the cellar where they were locked by digging a tunnel which lets in the water of the river.

Bad Ticket believes that they drowned. Some citizens, including Jacinto, see Luke and Roy Bean covered in flour, and take them for ghosts. This causes panic in Langtry while almost everyone believes that the city is haunted.

The citizens, discovering the responsibility of Bad Ticket, want to hang him with the undertaker (his accomplice). But Luke and Roy Bean (reluctant, but forced by Luke) come back to town and prove they are alive.

Roy Bean judges Bad Ticket and the undertaker and condemns them to leave Langtry and never return.

The army, called by Luke, arrives to arrest Roy Bean. However, there is no one in Langtry to judge him. Then, at Luke's request, Roy Bean judges himself and condemns himself to no longer be a judge.

Civilization and education arrive in Langtry and bandits leave. Lucky Luke recovers his cattle and takes them to Silver City.

== Ruée sur l'Oklahoma ==
Ruée sur l'Oklahoma, the fourteenth album in the series, was published by Dupuis in 1960 and by Cinebook in 2009 as The Oklahoma Land Rush. The story is based on the Land Rush of 1889.

The American government had given Oklahoma to the Indians, where they were bored, by 1830. Several years later, they bought the land back for glass beads to promote colonization. It was decided that the territory would open to colonization on April 22, 1889, with Luke responsible for monitoring the operation. Before the rush begins, some (including Beastly Blubber) are easily detected by Luke. Coyote Will and Dopey, his simple-minded accomplice, is also trying to cross the border and is quickly overtaken by Luke. The day before the rush, some have doped their horses and others have sabotaged competing carriages.

The next day at noon, the rush begins. A city is created, Boomville, where houses are quickly built. Speculation is rife, and some do business in gold. Coyote Will, Beastly Blubber and Dopey arrive and, after taking over the saloon, they sell illegal alcohol and establish a secret gambling den. Luke stops them.

Town elections are organized, and three-quarters of the population are candidates. The three bandits are released to vote, and Dopey decides to campaign. To the surprise of all (including his accomplices), he is elected mayor; with Luke's help, he is a good one. A drought begins; Coyote Will organizes a demonstration against the mayor, but a sandstorm ruins everything. People leave Oklahoma, and it is the end of Boomville. Dopey chases his former accomplices, saying that he now leads an honest life. Oklahoma is finally returned to the Indians for the same glass beads they had accepted at the beginning.

== L'Évasion des Dalton ==
L'Évasion des Dalton, written by Goscinny and Morris, is the fifteenth album in the series. It was published by Dupuis in 1960 and by Cinebook in English in 2011 as The Daltons' Escape.

The Daltons escape from the penitentiary, with Luke on their trail. The four brothers place fake search notices and publish fake newspaper articles to make Luke look like a criminal. He finds the Daltons, who capture him and force him to work for them. Luke escapes with the aid of the cavalry and, after winning a duel with Joe, brings the four brothers back to the penitentiary.

== En remontant le Mississippi ==
En remontant le Mississippi, written by Goscinny and Morris, is the sixteenth title in the series. It was published by Dupuis in 1961 and by Cinebook in English in 2021 as Steaming Up the Mississippi. Goscinny and Morris were avid readers of frontier tales (particularly Mark Twain's books), and this album is related to Twain's experience as a Mississippi steamboat pilot before the American Civil War. The plot and a number of details are borrowed from the 1870 race between the paddle steamers Robert E. Lee and Natchez IV.

Competition is fierce among steamboat captains plying the Mississippi River. The sleazy and devious Captain Lowriver (master of the paddle steamer Abestos D. Plover) is trying to establish a monopoly on the New Orleans-Minneapolis line, and wants arch-rival Captain Barrows (master of the Daisy Belle) out of the way. Both captains arrange a race from New Orleans to Minneapolis to settle the matter; whoever wins the race will be the sole operator of steamboats on the Mississippi. Confident in his ship and crew capabilities but fearing foul play from his opponent, Captain Barrows hires Luke as a supervisor and bodyguard. Lowriver hires a professional gambler, who almost wins Barrows' ship in a rigged poker game which is foiled by Luke.

The race continues, with floods, droughts and snag tree-trunks impeding both ships' progress. Luke gauges the river depth, preventing the Daisy Belle from running aground.

Lowriver hires a gunman (who is no match for Luke) and Ironhead Wilson, a bald bully whose bullet-proof head is a deadly weapon. Wilson batters the Daisy Belle's boiler with his head, allowing Lowriver's ship to take the lead during the final stage to Minneapolis.

Luke punches Wilson in the ribs, which feels like a tickle. Laughing uncontrollably, Wilson jumps overboard and is attacked by alligators. He overcomes the alligators and escapes. Barrows and his crew patch up the boiler and gain on the rival ship as the finish line in Minneapolis is in sight. Both ships' engineers and stokers try to raise the steam pressure, and the safety valves open. Lowriver sits on the valve counterweight (allowing his ship to regain the lead), and Barrows admits defeat. However, the boiler of Lowriver's ship explodes and sends Lowriver and his crew into the water and the waiting alligators. A dejected (and alligator-bitten) Lowriver is fished out by Luke and admits defeat, but a magnanimous Barrows tells him that there is room on the river for them both. Luke makes his usual exit into the sunset, singing his favorite song.

== Sur la piste des Dalton ==
Sur la piste des Dalton, written by Goscinny and Morris, is the seventeenth title in the series. Published by Dupuis in 1962 and by Cinebook in English in 2009 as On the Daltons' Trail, it contains the first appearance of the dog Rantanplan.

The Daltons escape, followed by Rantanplan. Reluctant to capture them again, Luke is forced to do so after they steal horses and a cow from a friend's house. Aided by Rantanplan, he catches up to them. Luke is taken prisoner by the Daltons, who use him as a bargaining chip for the release of Joe Dalton (who had been arrested in Rightful Bend). Averell Dalton (who is fond of Rantanplan) looks for him, leading to the capture of him and his brothers.

== À l'ombre des derricks ==
À l'ombre des derricks, written by Goscinny and illustrated by Morris, is the eighteenth title in the series. It was originally published by Dupuis in 1962, in French. English editions of this French series were published by Cinebook Ltd in 2007 as In the Shadow of the Derricks. The story is based on the historical oil rush in Titusville, Pennsylvania in 1859.

In 1859, Colonel Edwin Drake discovers oil in Titusville, Pennsylvania. There is an unprecedented rush to the small town. Everyone wants to have their share of oil and become rich. The Mayor, who fears overflows, telegraphs Lucky Luke for help. If he accepts, he will be appointed sheriff. At first, he thinks to refuse but he soon realizes that this rush to oil will lead to chaos if it is not controlled and he finally accepts, to the chagrin of Jolly Jumper .

Lucky Luke finds Titusville in chaos. Even the mayor has gone to drill. From the first day, Luke is threatened by a man named Bingle who does not want a law in Titusville. In fact, Bingle is the henchman of a certain Barry Blunt. Bingle is no match for Luke who arrests him. Blunt is quick to arrive and his avowed goal is to seize the city and all the nearby oil fields. He starts by paying Bingle's bail (who does not want to get out of jail because he found oil in his cell). Bingle is thrown out the gang.

In the weeks that followed, Barry Blunt and his men manage, by terror and threat, to seize all the oil wells, except that of Colonel Drake who holds out. Lucky Luke, who needs help, is allied with Colonel Drake. He organizes a plan with Bingle (who always wants to go back to his cell), which provokes Blunt who ends up beating him. Immediately, Luke puts him in prison. The judge refuses to judge him and resigns. Colonel Drake is elected judge and sentences Blunt to twenty years in prison. His men then take advantage of the night to burn the oil wells and help him escape. By court decision, the oil wells returned to their legitimate owners who manage to extinguish the fire. Blunt hides in Titusville where, disguised as an old man, he gets employed by Drake. He wants to kill Lucky Luke, but a gush of oil manages to neutralize him.

With law and order restored in Titusville, Lucky Luke hurries back to Texas, "where there is no oil!"

== Les Rivaux de Painful Gulch ==
Les Rivaux de Painful Gulch, written by Goscinny and illustrated by Morris, is the nineteenth book in the series. Originally published in French in 1962, English editions have been published by Dargaud and Cinebook as The Rivals of Painful Gulch. The story was inspired by the Hatfield–McCoy feud.

Luke tries to resolve a bitter feud between two families: the big-eared O'Haras and the big-nosed O'Timminses, whose rivalry causes mayhem in the town of Painful Gulch and ruins the local economy. The O'Timmins and O'Hara families have been fighting for decades, and no longer remember why. Luke is named mayor of the town to try and solve the problem. He tries to reconcile the families with a big party, with competitions rigged so that only an O'Timmins or O'Hara win, but the party ends in a fistfight. Luke decides to put the men of both families in prison until they make peace. The women of the families, tired of the war, force them to work together to put out a fire on the O'Hara ranch. Painful Gulch is finally at peace, and the families become friends.

== Billy the Kid ==
Billy the Kid, written by Goscinny and illustrated by Morris, is the twentieth book in the series. The original French-language version was printed in 1962 by Dupuis. It is the first in the English versions published by Cinebook Ltd.

In 1878, the town of Fort Weakling is "terrorized" by the notorious criminal Billy the Kid - or, more accurately, the citizens cower in fear of the things Billy, a bullying type, could supposedly do to them. Lucky Luke arrives at Fort Weakling, surprised at the deserted streets and the overly nervous welcome by the local hotel manager. He meets Billy, who finds him funny and invites him to drink hot chocolate in the saloon. As a result of a 'joke' of Billy's, Luke crushes a cake on his face. Billy finds it funny. When he learns that Luke has stood up to Billy, Josh Belly, the editor of the local newspaper and the only man in town determined to see Billy jailed, has Luke made assistant sheriff.

However, the fight against the bandit is more difficult than expected. Billy's victims are so terrified that they refuse to testify against him. Luke manages to find a local citizen to testify against him - Foster Rawson, the grocer, from whom Billy regularly steals red caramels - but Rawson attempts to flee the town to not have to testify. Lucky Luke retrieves him, but at the trial itself the members of the jury refuse to convict Billy, who leaves the court to the applause of the judge, the witness and the jury.

After these failed attempts, Lucky Luke decides to teach the people that desperados are not as bad as they pretend to be. With the help of Belly, he pretends to turn into a desperado and begins to terrorize the town, including with a staged stagecoach attack and a bank robbery. Citizens start demonstrating for Billy the Kid to defend them against Lucky Luke. Completely taken aback, Billy proposes an alliance with Luke, who rejects it with contempt. A duel is organized between the two in the main street, but the support of the population for Billy makes him break down, and Luke captures him. After some encouragement and recompensation by Luke and Belly, the citizens finally testify at Billy's trial, and Billy is sentenced to 1,247 years in prison.

== Les Dalton dans le blizzard ==
Les Dalton dans le blizzard, written by Goscinny and illustrated by Morris, is the twenty-second book in the series. It was originally published in French in 1963, and was published in English by Cinebook in 2009 as The Daltons in the Blizzard.

The Daltons again escape. This time, Joe has an idea to avoid Luke: they will cross the border and settle in Canada. To ensure that Luke will not follow their lead, they pretend to be the Jones brothers: Frank, Louis, Robert and Jim Jones. Everyone recognizes the Daltons, however; Luke has no trouble following their lead, especially since a witness told him that they were going to Canada. The Daltons cross the border in midwinter, attack a local saloon and learn that the only police officer in the area is Corporal Winston Pendergast. Pendergast, who lives with a man named Grospierre, has just met Luke (who has also crossed the border). Both men learn about the saloon attack (which makes the Daltons criminals in Canada), and decide to join forces to stop them. The Daltons are easy to track because they attack banks. Luke arrests William, Jack and Averell (who are soon released by Joe), and the Daltons decide to flee north.

They arrive in Golden Glow, where night is six months long. Joe's first goal is to buy the saloon where prospectors come to spend their gold, and they arrange a boxing match between Joe and Averell. Jack and William will bet for Joe, and he will win. Averell does not agree, however, and knocks Joe out. When William makes him listen to reason and Joe wins, spectators ransack the saloon. Disgusted, the owner leaves the country and the saloon becomes the property of the Daltons. Luke and Corporal Pendergast arrive in town and, with the local population against the Daltons, they flee. They surrender to Luke, who returns them to the U.S.

== Les Dalton courent toujours ==
Les Dalton courent toujours, written by Goscinny and illustrated by Morris, is the 23rd book in the series. A combination of two short stories featuring the Daltons, it was originally published in French in 1964 and by Cinebook in English in 2012 as The Daltons: Always on the Run.

The new president of the United States decrees a general amnesty. All prisoners are released, including the Daltons. They settle in a nearby town, Awful Gulch, and rent space next to the bank so they can tunnel in and steal money. Luke quickly moves the bank, and installs the sheriff's office there instead.

Joe Dalton changes his mind and attacks the stagecoach after Averell knocks Luke out. They spend time in Pocopoco Pueblo and, after their crimes become known, try to cross the desert. Luke then catches them and brings them back to the penitentiary.

== La Caravane ==
La Caravane, written by Goscinny and illustrated by Morris, was originally published in French by Dupuis in 1964. English editions of the album, The Wagon Train, were published by Dargaud and Cinebook. The story was loosely adapted into the film, Go West! A Lucky Luke Adventure.

A caravan arrives at Nothing Gulch. The guide, Frank Malone, does not want to drive it further if he is not given an extra $1,000. Caravan leader Andrew Boston persuades Luke to replace Malone. Luke meets caravan members Miss Littletown, Mr. Pierre, Ugly Barrow, Zachary Martins, and others. The day after they leave, a saboteur within the caravan strikes: the wheel of a wagon is sawed off; the following day, the harness of Andrew Boston's horses is cut. Their water barrels are drained when they arrive in the desert, but the caravan crosses anyway.

After a stop in Crazy Town (which the caravan's women burn before their men lose everything to cards), the expedition enters Sioux territory and most of their weapons mysteriously explode. The next night, a fire (forbidden by Luke) is lit in the camp. The following day, Luke and Ugly Barrow catch a Sioux (Head of Calf) who does not want to talk. The saboteur knocks out Andrew Boston the next night and frees Head of Calf, who reports to his boss (Enraged Dog). The Sioux besiege the caravan, enjoy a hearty meal and fall asleep, and the caravan members besiege the Indians in turn. Enraged Dog promises to stop the war if Mr. Pierre, the French hairdresser, will hand over his "scalps" (wigs).

On the eve of their arrival in California, a feeble old woman disappears from the caravan. Luke guesses that this is Frank Malone in disguise, and he is the saboteur; he finds Frank, and wins their duel. In California, the pioneers celebrate the end of their journey.

== La Ville fantôme ==
La Ville fantôme, written by Goscinny and illustrated by Morris, was published in 1965 by Dupuis. English editions of the album were published by Dargaud and Cinebook in 2006 as Ghost Town.

Luke encounters Denver Miles and Colorado Bill, who accompany him on his journey across a mountain. They reach Gold Hill, a town that has been abandoned for years. Its only resident is Powell, an old, bitter, delusional miner who threatens them with a shotgun. When he was young, Powell was tricked into buying a gold mine that was salted by its previous owner. When rumors spread that there was gold in the mountain, Gold Hill sprang up; when no gold was found, the town was abandoned. Powell refused to accept reality, and still believes that there is gold in his worthless mine. Luke, Miles and Bill leave for the town of Bingo Creek.

Miles and Bill are scammers who plan to buy Powell's mine, salt it and sell it for a high price. Luke is sympathetic with Powell, and decides to help him. The con men are thwarted at every turn, but Powell realizes the futility of his pursuit and agrees to sell them the mine in a few days after the authorities arrive in Bingo Creek. Miles and Bill salt the mine; Bill quickly has a newspaper article published about its value of the mine, beginning another gold rush. Powell, excited, returns to his mine. No one finds anything, however, and people believe that Powell is hiding the gold for himself. Luke forces Miles and Bill to confess; they are tarred and feathered and run out of town. The people again prepare to leave Gold Hill, but Luke says passionately that the true value of land is more than the riches it can hold. Powell agrees with Luke, and convinces many people to stay and help Gold Hill return to its former glory (without the gold mining).

Shortly before Luke leaves to continue his travels, Powell reveals that he has discovered a real vein of gold in his mine. Luke points out that if this is revealed to the public, Gold Hill would return to its old ways and probably never revive. Powell agrees and blows up his mine, ensuring that no one will know the truth and allowing Gold Hill to be a normal town.

== Les Dalton se rachètent ==
Les Dalton se rachètent, written by Goscinny and illustrated by Morris, is the 26th book in the series. Originally published in French in 1965, it was published in English by Cinebook in 2012 as The Daltons Redeem Themselves.

After a new law is enacted, the Daltons are paroled. If they commit a crime within 30 days of release, however, they will be returned to prison. The Daltons settle in the town of Tortilla Gulch to start their new life, and Luke is responsible for seeing that they remain really quiet during this probationary period.

== Le Vingtième de cavalerie ==
Le Vingtième de cavalerie, written by Goscinny and illustrated by Morris, is the twenty-seventh book in the series. Originally published in French in 1965, it was published in English in 2010 as The Twentieth Cavalry. The character Colonel McStraggle is a nod to actor Randolph Scott.

Due to illegal buffalo hunting on their land, the Cheyenne break their treaty authorizing the free movement of whites and are being provided firearms. Luke is sent to find a solution to the crisis and get a new treaty signed between Yellow Dog and McStraggle, colonel of the 20th Cavalry Regiment. He volunteers as a cavalry scout and, visiting Yellow Dog, learns that former cavalryman Derek Flood is hatching a plot against McStraggle for kicking him out of the army. The situation for the beleaguered soldiers becomes more desperate as Flood exploits his inside knowledge of the fort to starve out his ex-comrades. Luke and Grover McStraggle, the colonel's perpetually put-upon son, escape the siege to fetch reinforcements to rescue their comrades. They arrive as McStraggle leads a potentially-suicidal charge from the fort and force the Indians to surrender. Flood is arrested.

== L'Escorte ==
L'Escorte, written by Goscinny and illustrated by Morris, is the twenty-eighth book in the series. Originally published in French in 1966, it was published in English in 2009 by Cinebook as The Escort.

Four years after the clash between Luke and Billy the Kid which resulted in a 1,247-year prison sentence for Billy, Luke is asked to escort Billy to New Mexico to face trial for crimes he committed there. Billy's enduring reputation and his repeated attempts at escape (with the inept assistance of felon Bert Malloy) offer Luke and Jolly Jumper excitement along the way.

== Des barbelés sur la prairie ==
Des barbelés sur la prairie, written by Goscinny and illustrated by Morris, was originally published in French by Dupuis in 1967. An English edition, Barbed Wire on the Prairie, was published by Cinebook in 2007.

Luke involves himself in a quarrel between peaceful farmers and unscrupulous, fattened-up ranchers, led by Cass Casey, who drive their cattle across the farmers' crops in search of new pastures. The only way the farmers can see to stop the rampage is to use barbed wire to protect their land. With Luke's help, both sides eventually realize that without vegetation there is no meat and the story ends happily.

== Calamity Jane ==
Calamity Jane, written by Goscinny and illustrated by Morris, is the 30th book in the series. It was originally published in French by Dupuis in 1967. English editions of this French series have been published by Dargaud, and Cinebook in 2007.

While taking a wash in a river, Luke is attacked by some Apaches. Gunshots scare the attackers away, and when Luke meets his mysterious savior, it turns out to be none other than the legendary Calamity Jane. After telling Luke her life's story (which ends at this point with the death of her husband, Wild Bill Hickok), she relates that she has recently struck gold and is now ready to settle down again. Despite being slightly unnerved by her rugged, man-like manners, Luke invites her to accompany him to the town of El Plomo to investigate illegal arms trafficking to the local Apaches.

In El Plomo, Luke and Jane encounter August Oyster, owner of the local saloon, whom Jane challenges to an arm-wrestling match for her gold and his saloon. After Oyster's henchman and stand-in Baby Sam loses the match, Janes proceeds to convert the saloon into a place where the local women can also convene. Meanwhile, it is revealed that Oyster is the arms trafficker and his saloon served as a storage and transshipment place for his weapon deliveries. He tasks Baby Sam with driving Jane out of the saloon; after the latter fails twice, Oyster rallies the local Ladies' Guild against Jane. After convincing the ladies that Jane can be a respectful lady herself, Luke goes to great lengths to achieve this, even hiring an etiquette coach for the task.

While Jane undergoes ladyship training (and in turn converts her instructor to her rough ways), Luke follows a clue he found in the saloon's cellar to a nearby lead mine (from which the town has derived its name), and there discovers a stash of weapons and a secret tunnel to the saloon. He ambushes and captures Oyster and Baby Sam when they attempt to retrieve the weapons, but this pushes the patience of Oyster's business partner, Apache chief Gomino. As a result, the Apaches attack the town, but are driven away by Luke and Jane, winning the Ladies' Guild's respect. However, upon realizing that it is adventure she is living for, Jane decides to give up the quiet life and leaves the town after sharing a respectful farewell with Luke.

== Tortillas pour les Daltons ==
Tortillas pour les Daltons, written by Goscinny and illustrated by Morris, was published by Dupuis in 1967. An English translation, Tortillas for the Daltons, was published by Cinebook in 2008.

Moving from their regular prison to a newer one near the Rio Grande, the wagon containing the Dalton gang is hijacked by Mexican bandit Emílio Espuelas and his men. The two gangs team up to kidnap the local mayor, disguising the Daltons as mariachi musicians. The Mexican ambassador to the United States has threatened reduced diplomatic relations and, ultimately, war unless the Daltons are returned to the US. Luke is ordered by the president to leave for Mexico. He switches places with the mayor, and a drunk-on-tequila Averell reveals the Daltons' plan to double-cross the Mexicans. Back in the US, Luke receives a medal and Averell asks: "¿Cuando se come aqui?" ("When did I get here?").

== La Diligence ==
La Diligence, written by Goscinny and illustrated by Morris, is the 32nd book in the series. It was originally published in French in 1968, and in English by Cinebook in 2010 as The Stagecoach.

Due to its increasing number of stagecoach holdups, Wells Fargo decides to conduct a special trip with a load of gold from Denver to San Francisco (with Luke as an escort) to improve the company's failing public image and demonstrate the safety of its transport. A large advertising campaign is organized around the event. Some passengers join the trip: a photographer, a professional card player, a priest, a couple, and a gold-digger.

The stagecoach becomes the target for hold-up attempts, an Indian attack, an encounter with outlaw poet Black Bart, on-board gambling sessions, a traitor (Reverend Rawlins, the priest) among the passengers, and a diet of potatoes and lard (bacon and beans in some earlier translations). The gold arrives safely in San Francisco, and the passengers gain new personal insights from the trip.

== Le Pied-tendre ==
Le Pied-tendre, written by Goscinny and illustrated by Morris, was published in French by Dargaud in 1968. English translations, entitled The Tenderfoot, were published by Dargaud and Cinebook.

When Baddy (who owns a rich piece of land) dies, his heir (tenderfoot Waldo Badminton) leaves England to take possession of his ranch. The newcomer is unwelcome to Jack Ready, who was waiting to buy Baddy's ranch and tries to bully the newcomer. Waldo makes his way in the Far West aided by Lucky Luke, his butler Jasper and Sam, an Indian who served Baddy after he saved him from a massacre. Jack Ready fakes his death, and frames Waldo. Luke quickly discovers the ruse and defeats Ready in a European-style pistol duel; Ready and his sidekick leave town. Another tenderfoot arrives from England; Waldo dislikes him, and treats him the way he was treated.

== Dalton City ==
Dalton City, written by Goscinny and illustrated by Morris, was originally published in French by Dargaud in 1969. English editions were published by Dargaud, and by Cinebook in 2006.

Luke closes the corrupt Fenton Town, Texas, and arrests "mayor" Dean Fenton. Fenton brags about his town to the Daltons in prison. A mixup with the newly-installed telegraph results in Joe Dalton's release for good behavior. He breaks out the others and they decide to fix up Fenton Town, renaming it Dalton City. They capture Luke, who agrees to help them. They hire dancing girls, and Luke suggests staging a wedding of Joe and singer Lulu Breechloader to attract people. The guests arrive, but when the wedding is announced Lulu is unaware and is already married to pianist Wallace. The guests shoot at Luke before turning on Joe. The cavalry arrives to round up the criminals after being alerted by Wild Trout, an Indian who was cheated out of his roulette winnings. After everyone has left, Belle (one of the dancing girls) jumps out of the cake. Dalton City eventually becomes Angel Junction, a city with a population of 243,000.

== Jesse James ==
Jesse James, written by Goscinny and illustrated by Morris, was published in French in 1969 by Dargaud. English editions were published by Dargaud, Cinebook, and Brockhampton Press. It is loosely based on the life of Jesse James (1847–1882), who had previously made a cameo debut in Billy the Kid.

In 1880, Jesse James admires Robin Hood but cannot clearly define the line between the rich he is supposed to rob and the poor he is supposed to help. With the help of his brother Frank (depicted as a quasi-intellectual who quotes Shakespeare, Jesse redefines the term "poor" for his own benefit. With Cole Younger, their gang begins robbing trains en masse; this forces Luke to stop them with the somewhat-inept assistance of two Pinkerton detectives.

== Western Circus ==
Western Circus, the 36th title in the series, was written by Goscinny and illustrated by Morris. It was originally published in French in 1970 by Dargaud, which also published English-language editions.

Circus performers leave New York City due to enmity with entrepreneur P. T. Barnum, but their lovable, gambling, drunkard manager Captain Mulligan loses more and more of the circus during their tour until they meet Luke.

Zilch, wealthy organizer of a large annual rodeo, sees harmful competition in the Western Circus' arrival and hires hit man Rattlesnake Joe. However, Zilch and Mulligan become partners and successfully tour Europe.

== Canyon Apache ==
Canyon Apache, by Goscinny and Morris, was first published by Dargaud in French in 1971. English editions were published by Knight Books in 1977 and Cinebook in 2009 as Apache Canyon.

Luke is responsible for bringing peace to Colonel O'Nolan's cavalry and Patronimo's Apache tribe; there had been war since the Apaches kidnapped O'Nolan's son. Luke, considered a traitor to the cavalry, joins the Apaches as Lucky Luko but is also considered a traitor to the Apaches. When O'Nolan is captured, it is learned that the medicine man scheduled to execute him and Luke is O'Nolan's son. Patronimo is not a real Apache; his father, Bisteco (the previous chief, who disappeared years ago), is Lazlo Bystek and lives in New York.

== Ma Dalton ==
Ma Dalton, written by Goscinny and illustrated by Morris, was first published in French in 1971 by Dargaud. English editions have been published by Cinebooks and Tara Press.

Mrs. Dalton, mother of the Dalton Brothers, has a relatively quiet life in retirement until she invites her four sons to visit; Joe uses Ma's reputation with her fellow citizens to commit robberies. Ma later decides to return to the family business for the love of her sons (Averell in particular), and Luke must also deal with her.

== Chasseur de primes ==
Chasseur de primes, written by Goscinny and illustrated by Morris. The thirty-ninth book in the series, it was originally published in French in 1972 and in English by Cinebook in 2010 as The Bounty Hunter.

Elliot Belt is a notorious, unscrupulous bounty hunter. Luke is searching for His Highness, a stallion who has been stolen from wealthy rancher Bronco Fortworth. Fortworth, convinced that Wet Blanket (a Cheyenne former farmhand) is the thief, offers a $100,000 reward to whoever captures the Indian. Belt is interested and repeatedly asks Luke to join him, but the lone cowboy declines.

Luke (concerned about an Indian war) tries to find Wet Blanket first; Elliot Belt, obsessed with the reward, brings together several other bounty hunters to attack the Cheyenne village. Luke is captured by the Cheyenne; Wet Blanket, proclaiming his innocence, frees him and agrees to stand trial. A protest by Fortworth and the bounty hunters is deflected by Luke; Belt kidnaps the Indian to collect the bounty, but Wet Blanket walks away and is collected by Luke when the other bounty hunters ambush Belt.

On the way back to the town of Cheyenne Pass (where the trial will be held), Luke and Wet Blanket find His Highness and bring him to the courthouse. Thelma (Fortworth's estranged wife) testifies at the trial that she released the stallion because she was jealous of Fortworth's affection for the horse. The Fortworths reconcile; Wet Blanket is exonerated, and Fortworth gives the reward to the Cheyenne.

As Luke leaves the court, Belt unsuccessfully tries to kill him. Luke learns that Belt is wanted for trying to cause an Indian war. He persuades the sheriff to release Belt but the federal warrant is still posted, and Belt is chased by his fellow bounty hunters. The Cheyenne use Fortworth's money to open an amusement park.

== Le Grand Duc ==
Le Grand Duc, written by René Goscinny and illustrated by Morris, is the fortieth book in the series. Originally published in French in 1973, it was published in English by Cinebook in 2011 as The Grand Duke. The story is loosely based on Grand Duke Alexei Alexandrovich of Russia, son of Emperor Alexander II and ambassador to the United States, who visited the U.S. from 1871 to 1872 and hunted buffalo with Buffalo Bill.

In the story, Russian Grand Duke Leonid pays a diplomatic visit to the United States. He enjoys reading James Fenimore Cooper, and wants to travel through the West (experiencing bandits and Indian attacks) before signing an important treaty. Luke, his bodyguard, is targeted by a Russian anarchist who tries to assassinate the grand duke. They travel the country with the duke's interpreter, chased by the mysterious terrorist. Their journey begins in Abilene, Kansas, where cowboys meet.

== L'Héritage de Rantanplan ==
L'Héritage de Rantanplan, written by Goscinny and illustrated by Morris, is the forty-first book in the series. It was published in French in 1973 and in English by Cinebook in 2020 as Rin Tin Can's Inheritance. Mark Twain appears in two panels on page 13.

Oggie Svenson (a former inmate of Rantanplan's penitentiary) bequeaths his real-estate fortune in to the dog, who leaves prison to live in his Virginia City, Nevada hotel under Luke's protection. Svenson's will stipulates that if Rantanplan dies, everything will go to Joe Dalton; the Daltons escape, and try to kill the dog.

== Le Cavalier blanc ==
Le Cavalier blanc, by Goscinny and Morris, was published in English as The Dashing White Cowboy by Dargaud and Cinebook. Luke encounters a wandering theater troupe whose specialty is the dramatic play, The Dashing White Cowboy. In each town where they perform, however, a robbery takes place during the climactic end scene. Luke keeps a sharp eye on the group, but is framed twice. With the help of Gladys, a repentant member of the troupe, he brings the culprits to justice.

== La Guérison des Dalton ==
La Guérison des Dalton, written by Goscinny and illustrated by Morris, is the forty-fourth book in the series. Originally published in French in 1975, it was published in English by Cinebook in 2010 as A Cure for the Daltons.

Psychologist Otto Von Himbeergeist announces that crime is a psychologically-based personal problem which can be cured by therapy, and chooses the Dalton brothers as his test subjects. The doctor brings them to a farm as a better environment for treatment, and Luke has to watch them. The Daltons escapes with the professor, who allies with them. They develop a special method for their robberies: Otto psychoanalyses the director of the bank, who gives them the money. The treatment worked on Averell, however, who does not want to commit crimes anymore. Using this against the others, Luke captures the gang and takes them to jail.

== L'Empereur Smith ==
L'Empereur Smith, written by Goscinny and illustrated by Morris, is the forty fifth book in the series. It was originally published in French by Dargaud in the year 1976 and in English by Cinebook in 2010 as Emperor Smith. The story is loosely based on the life of the historical Emperor Norton of San Francisco.

In the small town of Grass Town, Lucky Luke meets Dean Smith, a wealthy rancher in the area who has lost his mind and imagines himself to be the Emperor of the United States. Thanks to his fortune, Smith was able to afford to hire a small army, equipped with cannons, and to put on a whole apparatus. Amused by this character who they consider harmless, the people of Grass Town play the game and pretend to take Smith seriously.

The situation escalates when Buck Ritchie, a notorious bandit of the region, gets to meet Smith, and convinces him to use his army to occupy the city. Terrorized, the locals rank on the side of Smith, who sets out to reconquer all the United States, making Grass Town the new capital of the country.

Judged for high treason, Sheriff Linen and Whitman, the editor of the newspaper, cowardly plead their case, and are pardoned by Emperor Smith who gives a title and a ministry to each. Convicted, Barney, the judge, is sentenced to death, commuted to life in prison, while Lucky Luke manages to escape, and plans to neutralize Smith, and free Grass Town. He does this by infiltrating a ball and kidnapping Smith. Gates, his second-in-command, and former cook, attempts to lead them, but with no-one to pay them, his soldiers quit. Luke arrests Gates. Richie duels Luke, cannon versus pistol, with Luke firing a bullet down the cannon, exploding it.

Luke goes to Smith, locked in a small hut nearby, and advises him to cross the nearby Rio Grande into Mexico.

== Le Fil qui chante ==
Le Fil qui chante, written by Goscinny and illustrated by Morris, is the forty-sixth book in the series. Originally published in French in 1977 by Dargaud, it was published in English by Cinebook in 2012 as The Singing Wire. The story is based on the 1861 construction of the first transcontinental telegraph line connecting the West and East Coast of the United States. It was an episode of the 1984 animated series, Lucky Luke.

One hundred thousand dollars is offered to the city which first builds a telegraph line to Salt Lake City: Carson City, Nevada in the west or Omaha, Nebraska in the east. Sabotage and Indian attacks slow progress, of which Lucky Luke is a part after his resignation from the Pony Express.

== Le Magot des Dalton ==
Le Magot des Dalton, written by Goscinny, illustrated by Morris and texted by Vicq, is the forty-seventh book in the series. Originally published in French in 1980 by Dargaud, it was published in English by Cinebook in 2016 as the 58th album, titled The Daltons' Stash.

The Daltons are transferred to a new penitentiary and are made to share a cell with bumbling counterfeiter Fennimore Buttercup. When the Daltons prove too noisy for him to bear, Buttercup devises a plan to make them break out of jail and chase after a made-up stash of $100,000 buried at the foot of a huge boulder in the town of Red Rock Junction. Arriving there, the Daltons find to their dismay that the rock is located inside another, heavily guarded penitentiary, so they try everything they can think of to make local judge Poindexter put them into that jail, to no avail, thus they resort to digging their way inside.

When Luke chases after the Daltons, he notices that Poindexter is strangely lenient to minor offenders but willingly arrests heavy-duty criminals. As he follows the Daltons into the jail, he finds it a literal robber's den; Poindexter is running the facility as a safe haven for outlaws in exchange for their ill-begotten gains. With the help of the local sheriff and the cavalry, Luke puts an end to this scheme, and the Daltons, arrested in the clean-up, arrange for another breakout to take their revenge on Buttercup.

== Sarah Bernhardt ==
Sarah Bernhardt was written by Xavier Fauche and Jean Léturgie and illustrated by Morris. The first Lucky Luke story after René Goscinny's death, it was published in French in 1982 and by Cinebook in English in 2017. The plot features actress Sarah Bernhardt. The story was adapted as an episode of the animated Lucky Luke series, with a fictional singer and actress instead of Bernhardt.

In 1880, French actress Sarah Bernhardt plans a visit to the United States. U.S. President Rutherford B. Hayes asks Luke to protect her during her tour from the League for Virtue and his wife. Bernhardt indeed visited the United States in 1880. Some preachers warning people against her debauchery is also authentic, as is Bernhardt's posing for a photograph on top of a dead whale in Boston.

== La Corde du pendu ==
La Corde du pendu et autres histoires (The Hangman's Rope and Other Stories), written by Goscinny and Morris and illustrated by Morris, was originally published in French in 1982. The album contains seven short stories. Its title is the same as La Corde du Pendu (1870), the last, incomplete novel featuring Rocambole.

In "La Corde du pendu", a small-town rope merchant encourages the local mob to hang every culprit for the smallest of offenses – a practice Luke decides to end. In "Les Dalton prennent le train" ("The Daltons Take the Train"), the Daltons escape again and decide to rob trains; they are hindered by competing bandits and, in the end, Luke. In "Le Justicier" ("The Justiciary"), Luke arrives in Coyote Gulch and meets Zozzo, a hapless vigilante. After failing to train him, Luke disguises himself as Zozzo and walks around the town to frighten passing troublemakers; this earns Zozzo a reputation as a hero. In "La Mine du chameau" ("The Camel Mine") Luke meets Hadji Ali, a Muslim who tries to prove the worth of his camels and becomes a legend in Arizona after discovering a gold mine and relinquishing it to the locals. The story was inspired by the experimental United States Camel Corps.

In "Règlement de comptes" ("Gunfight"), Luke re-encounters saloon dancer Laura Legs from Le Grand Duc. The son of a rich rancher, who has a crush on Laura, is jealous and challenges Luke to a duel. The rancher's son eventually finds his true match with the blacksmith's daughter, who is genuinely in love with him. In "La Bonne parole" ("The Good Word"), dedicated and stubborn preacher Absestos Misbeliever travels to Apache territory to bring them the word of God. With Misbeliever's incautious approach, Luke finds himself the preacher's escort. In "Li-Chi's Story", Luke's Chinese acquaintance rises from sheriff of a Chinese-immigrant town to an unsuccessful candidacy for the U.S. presidency.

== Daisy Town ==
Daisy Town, written by Goscinny and Morris and illustrated by Morris, was published in French in 1983 and in English by Cinebook in 2016. The album is an adaptation of the 1971 Lucky Luke film, Daisy Town.

Daisy Town, a new town in the Far West, attracts criminals who spread fear and chaos in its streets. Recently arrived in town, and preceded by his reputation, Luke agrees to be the sheriff. The Dalton brothers arrive and decide to make Daisy Town their own, aiming to terrorize the population. Luke systematically defeats them, driving them out of town covered in tar and feathers. The Daltons are captured by the Indians; Joe Dalton inspires the chief to hate Daisy Town, and he digs up the hatchet. The Indians go into battle, keeping the Daltons prisoner. Luke defends Daisy Town with the aid of the cavalry, and the Indians flee. The story ends with the discovery of gold in the mountains; this sparks a gold rush, making Daisy Town a ghost town.

== Sources ==
- Morris publications in Spirou BDoubliées (in French)
