= Daisy Town =

Daisy Town may refer to:

- Daisy Town (film), a 1971 French-Belgian film based upon the comic book character Lucky Luke
- Daisy Town (comics), a 1983 Lucky Luke comic, adapted from the film
