= The Daltons (Lucky Luke) =

Fictional characters

- The Daltons, from the top to the bottom: Averell, Jack, William and Joe. In earlier appearances (as well as the Xilam animated series), William and Jack swap sizes, making the order Averell, William, Jack and Joe.

Publication information
- Publisher: Dupuis, Dargaud, Lucky Comics
- First appearance: 1958
- Created by: Morris and René Goscinny

Joe, William, Jack and Averell Dalton, known together as The Daltons or the Dalton brothers, are fictional characters in the Lucky Luke Western comics series. Four brothers and outlaws acting as the most recurring enemies to protagonist Lucky Luke, they were created by artist Morris and writer René Goscinny. Loosely inspired by the real-life Dalton Gang active in the United States in early 1890s (who themselves appeared in the 1954 Lucky Luke story "Outlaws"), The Daltons first had a one-panel cameo appearance in the 1958 comic Lucky Luke versus Joss Jamon, before being prominently featured later that year in the comic The Dalton Cousins (named as such because the four are billed as the cousins of their real-life counterparts within the Lucky Luke universe).

While Morris depicted the real-life Dalton brothers as evil and successful, the fictional Dalton cousins are dysfunctional, messy and less skillful. They are strictly identical except for height: Joe, the oldest and shortest brother, is the smartest and most cunning, while Averell, the youngest and tallest, is dumb and wholly incompetent; William and Jack, the middle brothers, have relatively colorless personalities and less dialogue than their other siblings. Their storylines often begin with the gang escaping from prison, followed by prison dog Rantanplan, and later Lucky Luke, as they try to carry out whatever plans Joe, or their mother Ma Dalton, has in mind; they are traditionally captured or back in jail by the end of the story.

The characters have appeared in a variety of adaptations, including the 1984 animated TV series, the 1991 film, and the 1992 TV series; they even acted as protagonists of several derived works, such as the 2004 film Les Dalton and the 2010-15 TV series The Daltons.

== The original gang's appearance ==
The Dalton Gang's Cousins in their first appearance

The "real" Daltons—Bob, Grat, Bill and Emmett—appear in the Lucky Luke adventure "Hors-la-loi" written and drawn by Morris in 1951. Morris drew them absolutely identical in everything but height: Bob was the shortest and also portrayed as most dangerous (he led the historical gang), and Emmett was the tallest (also the youngest, historically).

At the end of this adventure, all the Daltons are killed in an attempted double bank robbery in Coffeyville, Kansas. Historically, Bob and Grat were killed there, but Emmett survived severe wounds and was imprisoned for 14 years, while Bill did not take part at all.

In a later Lucky Luke story, "The Dalton Uncles" (2014), Emmett is shown as having survived the Coffeyville shoot-out, and has since fathered a son which the cousins Daltons are now laying claim to. Emmett Jr. is characterized as taking after Averell in his gluttony and childish nature.

== The fictional cousins ==
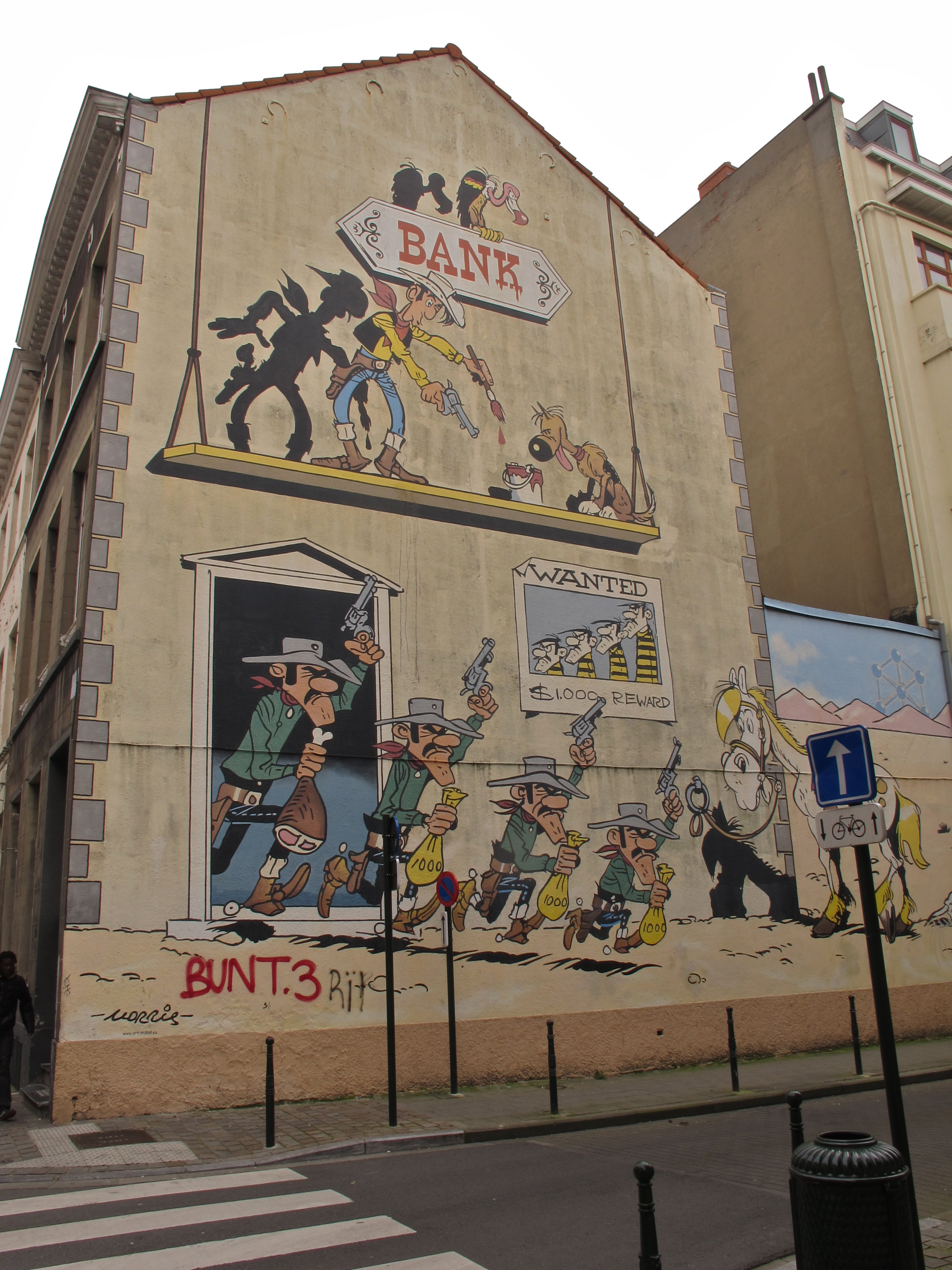
The Daltons and Lucky Luke portrayed on a mural at the Rue de la Buanderie, as part of the Brussels' Comic Book Route

Morris regretted killing off the Dalton gang, who were popular with readers. Thus, he created a second quartet, introduced as cousins of the historic persons. By this point, he had made the series more humorous, with violence featured as slapstick and less lethal. The entirely fictional brothers are Joe, Jack, William and Averell. They look just like their "cousins". Each is taller than the previous one, though they vary in personality: from Joe the hot-tempered leader to the goofy, dim-witted, childlike Averell who thinks chiefly about food. These Daltons are featured in many of Lucky Luke's adventures, typically breaking out of jail at the beginning and being sent back by Luke at the end. The prison dog Rantanplan is often assigned to help Luke in tracking them down.

The Daltons also appear in a spin-off series, Rantanplan, as well as many episodes of various Lucky Luke animated series. In another spin-off, Lucky Kid, they appeared in a story titled "Oklahoma Jim," in which they meet Lucky Luke for the first time as kids.

=== Joe Dalton ===
The shortest, oldest, angriest, evilest, and least stupid of the brothers, Joseph "Joe" Dalton, is the leader of the gang who frequently masterminds their prison breaks and various schemes. Perpetually furious and motivated chiefly by a consuming hatred of Lucky Luke and Rantanplan, Joe frequently beats up his youngest brother Averell for his dim-wittedness. Joe is quick to draw his gun but is fortunately not much of a shooter.

When the brothers split up in "Cavalier seul", Joe is the only one who continues robbing banks, stagecoaches and trains; he settled in a ghost town to revel in his new wealth. He sometimes sings a parody of Lucky Luke's signature tune. Instead of "I'm a poor lonesome cowboy and a long, long way from home," he sings, "I'm a rich lonesome outlaw and a long, long way from home".

=== William and Jack Dalton ===
The middle of the quartet, William Dalton and John "Jack" Dalton are the middle brothers. They have somewhat colorless personalities and mostly act as buffers between Joe and Averell, calming down the former and shutting up the latter. They often repeat the same sentence: "Calm down, Joe" and "Joe, calm down". In their first appearance, Jack was a trigger-happy arms maniac and William a master of disguise, but those characteristics were not kept in subsequent albums. When Morris created the brothers, William was usually the shorter of the two, but in some stories, as well as animated series, William becomes the taller of the two. Yet their personalities stay the same.

In "Cavalier seul", William becomes the boss of an illegal gambling hole, while Jack becomes a corrupt politician. In both cases when Lucky Luke arrives with warrants for their arrest, he finds that each brother has made use of his new status to gain legal impunity.

In the Xilam Animated Series, Jack is Joe's right-hand brother, often questioning and agreeing with Joe's schemes while William becomes the Bookworm of the gang, being knowledgeable about topics that the gang usually ignores and sometimes breaking the fourth wall to explain some facts to the viewer (The Diving Bell Concept, Women's rights in the 19th century, etc.).

=== Averell Dalton ===
Averell Dalton is the tallest, youngest and most dim-witted of the Daltons. Obsessed chiefly with food, Averell is sometimes prone to eating various non-edible items such as soap bars and candles, which he finds delicious. His very limited understanding of any situation and tendency to goof make him the weakest link of the gang. Averell is actually rather good-natured and not particularly interested in criminal activities, but he has almost no will of his own and simply follows his brothers. He likes rather girlish things such as sewing and dancing. As a result of his good behavior and his idiocy, his rewards for his capture are often very low unlike his brothers.

However, as shown in several albums, Averell is perfectly capable of taking care of himself when out on his own. He boldly calls Lucky Luke out for hand-to-hand combat in the album in which he is introduced (and inadvertently triggers a brawl in the street outside the saloon he and Luke are in). And after the brothers split up in "Cavalier seul", Averell befriends an Italian chef who he helps by working in the kitchen, expanding the line of dishes and later becomes involved with extortion of other surrounding restaurants and Mafia practices to expand the brand. Again as Lucky Luke arrives with a warrant for his arrest, he finds that largely thanks to Averell, his new "family" has gotten legal impunity. In "La corde au cou" Averell is shown to be quite content with married life, much unlike his brothers (although the personal traits of their respective Indian wives could also be a contributing factor).

Despite usually being tender-hearted, Averell sometimes is quite nasty. He also has a changing relationship with Rantanplan. In some books, he seems to like him, but in others he hates him, swears about him and kicks him. Notably, despite his enormous affinity for food, Averell is a mediocre cook at best, but hates having the quality of his food questioned as seen in Dalton City, where he asks for Joe's gun when Lucky Luke criticizes his speciality, curry and eggs (though the virtually omnivorous Rantanplan still likes the dish).

=== Other Daltons ===
There were other Daltons that either appear or are mentioned where they are the fictional relatives of the historic Daltons:

- Never appeared, but was once mentioned in a Dalton episode, is an uncle Abigail. Before his unknown death, he left the boys a cow.
- Later stories of Lucky Luke also feature the mother of the Daltons named Ma Dalton who was the fictional aunt of the historical Daltons. Unlike her sons, Ma Dalton was a popular character in her area and the locals agreed to keep her well stocked in food. Not wanting to appear to be an object of charity, Ma would do her shopping with an old gun, the way her male relatives would rob a bank. Customers and staff would just raise their arms and serve her with a smile. Ma later returned to actual crime, allowing her sons to dress up as her in order to rob the banks more easily (the bank managers hesitate to admit that they had been robbed by an old woman). Of all her sons, she appears to prefer Averell but has said that Joe is the one she loves the most. She treats her grown-up sons as if they were still children: washing the mouth of one of them with soap when he uses abusive language and even spanking Joe. In La Ballade des Dalton, it's commented she used to remind Jack to put on his sweater whenever she took them to raids. Ma Dalton was somewhat inspired by real-life Ma Barker. But its also clear she was married once has she is a widow but almost got married again.
- Never appearing himself, but often mentioned is the Daltons' father. Joe is supposed to be very much like him. He was a safe-cracker, but decided to try out dynamite in his job and was killed in the explosion.
- One story features Marcel Dalton, a bank owner living in Switzerland, a disgrace to the Dalton family because of his honesty. He is Pa Dalton's only brother and the Dalton Brothers' uncle.
- In the animated movie La Ballade des Dalton (and the adaptation comic album of the same name), an Uncle Henry Dalton is mentioned. He is only seen on a "Wanted" poster and a statue of him is also shown near the end (he looks much like Joe). He is referred to as a great bandit, inspiration and idol to Joe, Jack, William and Averell. In the movie, the boys are told that Henry was hanged. His will stipulates that the boys inherit his fortune if they will kill the judge and jury who convicted him, under the eye of Lucky Luke, the 'only honest and trustworthy man' Henry ever met. Henry is said to look like the Daltons' father who was mentioned to have stayed in prison for 40 years. After the Daltons are arrested, Henry's fortune is given away to charity.
- Another uncle named Jim is mentioned once in La Guérison des Dalton where he is mentioned to have been hanged.
- The Xilam Series introduces Bill Dalton, Ma's missing brother who stole a suitcase that contained something valuable.
- Also from the Xilam series, the Daltons are introduced to their female Cousins from Boston, Joana Dalton, Jacqueline Dalton, Wilhemina Dalton and Eva Dalton, who break out their cousins in order to get an inheritance from their late father, Jason Dalton.
- A grandfather is mentioned once in La Guérison des Dalton whose name is Franky Dalton. He is Ma Dalton's father.
- Emmett Jr., as the name implies is the son of Emmett Dalton. He is very much like Averell, a glutton and a fun loving goofball.
- In La Guérison des Dalton, Averell mentions an Uncle Zeke, briefly when reminiscing how, on the day of his hanging, Ma Dalton butchered a pig in honour of him. It is unknown, however, which side of the family Zeke came from, so it is not clarified whether Zeke was the brother of the brothers' father or of Ma Dalton.

=== Appearance in albums ===
The Dalton brothers appeared in the following Lucky Luke albums:

1. Lucky Luke contre Joss Jamon (11) (one-panel cameo)
2. Les Cousins Dalton (12) (proper introduction)
3. L'Évasion des Dalton (15)
4. Sur la piste des Dalton (17)
5. Billy the Kid (20) (cameo)
6. Les Collines noires (21)
7. Les Dalton dans le blizzard (22)
8. Les Dalton courent toujours (23)
9. Les Dalton se rachètent (26)
10. L'Escorte (28) (cameo)
11. Tortillas pour les Dalton (31)
12. Dalton City (34)
13. Jesse James (35) (cameo)
14. Ma Dalton (38)
15. L'Héritage de Rantanplan (41)
16. Le Cavalier blanc (43)
17. La Guérison des Dalton (44)
18. Le Magot des Dalton (47)
19. La Ballade des Dalton et autres histoires (48)
20. "Les Dalton prennent le train" in La corde du pendu et autres histoires (50)
21. Daisy Town (51)
22. Fingers (52)
23. La Fiancée de Lucky Luke (54)
24. Nitroglycérine (57)
25. "Olé Daltonitos" and "Un cheval disparaît" in "L'alibi" (58)
26. Le Pony Express (59)
27. L'Amnésie des Dalton (60)
28. Les Dalton à la noce (62)
29. Belle Starr (Lucky Luke) (65)
30. Oklahoma Jim (Lucky Luke) (68)
31. Marcel Dalton (69)
32. Le Prophète (70)
33. La légende de l'ouest (72)
34. La Corde au cou (74)
35. Lucky Luke contre Pinkerton (76)
36. Cavalier seul (77)
37. Les Tontons Dalton (78)

== Film and television adaptations ==
Several animated Lucky Luke films feature the Daltons, including:

- Lucky Luke (1971)
- La Ballade des Dalton (1978)
- Les Dalton en cavale (1983, an anthology film with episodes of the Hanna-Barbera Lucky Luke TV series)

The Hanna-Barbera cartoon in the 80s called Lucky Luke featured the fictional Dalton Brothers with Joe Dalton voiced by Frank Welker, Jack Dalton voiced by Rick Dees, William Dalton voiced by Fred Travalena, Averell Dalton voiced by Bob Holt, and Ma Dalton voiced by Mitzi McCall.

The animated TV series of the early 1990s, which closely adapted the comics, also featured the Daltons, including in "Hors-la-loi" in place of the original Daltons.

The Daltons appeared also in the first Italian live action movie Lucky Luke (1991) and the follow-up TV series, in which they were portrayed by Ron Carey, Dominic Barto, Bo Greigh and Fritz Sperberg. Note that "Averell" was constantly misspelled as "Averill".

The Daltons also starred in a 2004 movie titled simply Les Dalton, in which Luke barely appeared and which got poor reviews.

The TV animation series The New Adventures of Lucky Luke (started in 2001) includes the four Dalton brothers in most episodes.

The 2007 animated film Go West! A Lucky Luke Adventure produced by Xilam stars the Daltons as the main characters, even though the comic The caravan that served as inspiration to the film does not.

Xilam has also produced an animated television series titled The Daltons, focusing on the characters of the Daltons. The series contains 78 episodes each lasting for 8 minutes and premiered in fall 2010 in France.

== In other media ==
- Joe Dassin had a 1967 hit record, "Les Dalton", inspired by the characters.
- The book story "Les Dalton prennent le train" was released as a vinyl in 1967.
- The Walibi leisure park in Belgium features a "Dalton Terror" drop ride loosely themed upon the Daltons.
- The "Dalton Channel" was introduced on YouTube in 2019.
- An escape room in Brussels, The Daltons' Escape, has a set completely in the comic books style in which visitors get a Dalton outfit.
