= Rantanplan =

Fictional Lucky Luke dog

Publication information
- Publisher: Dargaud, Lucky Comics
- First appearance: Spirou magazine
- Created by: Morris, René Goscinny

In-story information
- Notable aliases: Rin-Tin-Can; Rintindumb; Bushwack

Rantanplan (French: [ʁɑ̃tɑ̃ˈplɑ̃]; alternatively spelled Ran-Tan-Plan and Ran Tan Plan) is a fictional hound dog created by a Belgian cartoonist Morris and French writer René Goscinny. Originally a supporting character in the Lucky Luke series, Rantanplan later starred in self-titled series. Rantanplan is a spoof of the male German Shepherd Rin Tin Tin. In the Turkish translations of the series, he is indeed named Rin Tin Tin. English versions of the books have renamed him "Rin-Tin-Can" and "Bushwack" in the 1983 Hanna-Barbera animated television series Lucky Luke, as well as "Rintindumb" in the French comedy animated TV series The Daltons produced by French animation studio Xilam.

== Publication history ==
The character first appeared in the earliest panels of the story Sur la piste des Dalton, published on 4 February 1960 in the Franco-Belgian comics magazine Spirou, and later as an album in 1962.

Rantanplan portrayed on the front cover of L'Héritage de Rantanplan (1973)

The character remained a fixture over a long series of Lucky Luke publications, resulting in a series of its own spin-off publications starting in 1987. Ten years after the death of Goscinny, for the production of the Rantanplan series, Morris collaborated with scenarists such as Jean Léturgie, Bob de Groot and Vittorio Leonardo.

== Personality ==
Rantanplan is a prison guard dog, often tasked with watching over the Daltons or assisting Lucky Luke track them down when they escape. However, he is unable to understand this and often mistakes Joe Dalton, who hates him psychotically, for a beloved owner. As well as being stupid, Rantanplan is extremely slow and accident-prone. However, he is usually very good-natured and loyal. Like Averell Dalton, he has a huge appetite and will devour everything put in front of him, whether it is food or not, which has ranged from bars of soap to dishwater. Due to his stupidity and general incompetence as a guard dog, all kinds of villains in the series always manage to break out of the prison at the end of every volume.

Lucky Luke's horse, Jolly Jumper, a very intelligent animal, holds Rantanplan in contempt, regarding him as one of nature's great mistakes.

== Animated series ==
In 2006, French animation studio Xilam produced an animated television series of Morris's Rantanplan stories in 90-second episodes, broadcast on the French television network France 3. It is broadcast on Canadian television network YTV in Canada under the name Rintindumb, and distributed by Mediatoon. It featured the voices of Maurice LaMarche and Rob Paulsen. It was on the Finnish family-friendly streaming service Toons.TV until 2015.

== Bibliography ==
Dargaud

- La Mascotte, 1987, written by Léturgie and Fauche, drawn by Morris (The Mascot)
- Le Parrain, 1988, written by Léturgie and Fauche, drawn by Morris (The Godfather)

Lucky Productions

- Rantanplan otage, 1992, written by Léturgie, Janiver and Fauche, drawn by Morris (Rantanplan hostage)
- Le Clown, 1993, written by Léturgie, Janiver and Fauche, drawn by Morris (The Clown)
- Bêtisier 1, 1993, written by Léturgie, Janiver and Fauche, drawn by Morris (Bloopers 1)
- Bêtisier 2, 1993, written by Léturgie and Fauche, drawn by Janiver (Bloopers 2)
- Le Fugitif, 1994, written by Léturgie and Fauche, drawn by Janiver (The Fugitive)
- Bêtisier 3, 1995, written by Leonardo, drawn by Morris (Bloopers 3)
- Le Messager, 1995, written by Léturgie and Fauche (The Messenger)
- Les Cerveaux, 1996, written by de Groot, drawn by Morris (The Brains)
- Le Chameau, 1997, written by Léturgie, Adam and Fauche, drawn by Morris (The Camel)
- Bêtisier 4, 1998, written by de Groot, drawn by Morris (Bloopers 4)
- Le Grand Voyage, 1998, written by de Groot, drawn by Morris (The Big Trip)

Lucky Comics

- Bêtisier 5, 2000, written by Leonardo, drawn by Morris (Bloopers 5)
- La Belle et le Bête, 2000, written by Leonardo and de Groot, drawn by Morris (Beauty and the Beast)
- Le Chien plus bête que son ombre, 2000, written by de Groot, drawn by Morris (The Dog more stupid than his shadow)
- Bêtisier 6: Le Noël de Rantanplan, 2001, written by Léturgie and Fauche, drawn by Janiver (Bloopers 6: Rantanplan's Christmas)
- Chien perché!, 2002, written by Léturgie and Fauche, drawn by Janiver (Perched dog!)
- Haut les pattes!, 2003, written by Léturgie and Fauche, drawn by Janiver (High legs!)
- Le Joli Cœur, 2003, written by Léturgie and Fauche, drawn by Janiver (The Pretty Heart)
- Bêtisier 7: Sur le Pied de Guerre, 2008, written by Léturgie and Fauche, drawn by Janiver (Bloopers 7: On the Warparth)
- Bêtisier 8: Chien D'arrêt, 2009, written by Léturgie and Fauche, drawn by Janiver (Bloopers 8: Stop Dog)
- Morts de Rire, 2010, written by Léturgie and Fauche, drawn by Janiver (Deaths of Laughing)
- Carré D'os, 2011, written by Léturgie and Fauche, drawn by Janiver (Bone Square)
