= Lucky Luke (1992 TV series) =

- Genre: Western; Comedy
- Based on: Lucky Luke by: Morris; René Goscinny
- Directed by: Terence Hill; Ted Nicolaou; Richard Schlesinger
- Starring: Terence Hill; Nancy Morgan; Ron Carey; Ruth Buzzi; John Saxon
- Composers: Aaron Schroeder; David Grover
- Countries of origin: Italy; United States
- Original language: English
- No. of seasons: 1
- No. of episodes: 8

Production
- Executive producer: Lucio Bompani
- Running time: 50 minutes
- Production companies: Paloma Films; Reteitalia

Original release
- Network: Canale 5
- Release: March 20 – May 22, 1992

Lucky Luke is a Western-comedy television miniseries starring Terence Hill that aired in 1992, and was based on the Belgian comic book series Lucky Luke and on a movie with the same title directed and produced by the same Hill in 1991. Eight episodes were produced.

== Production ==
The series was a co-production by Paloma Films and Reteitalia, and was directed, produced by and starring Terence Hill. It is a live-action adaptation of the comic book series Lucky Luke by Morris and René Goscinny, and on the movie with the same title directed and produced by the same Hill in 1991.

It was shot in: Bonanza Creek Ranch and Santa Fe (New Mexico), Zia Pueblo, Valles Caldera National Preserve, White Sands National Monument and La Junta (Colorado), Tucson (Arizona)

Eight episodes were produced, each with the running time of 50 minutes. Originally, 13 episodes were planned, but Terence Hill became depressed after his adopted son Ross lost his life in a road accident in Stockbridge, Massachusetts. Ross was scheduled to appear as Billy the Kid in the series.

The series was originally aired on Canale 5 on 20 March 1992.

== Episodes ==
1. Una notte di mezza estate a Daisy Town / Midsummer in Daisy Town (20 March 1992)
2. La mamma dei Dalton / Ma Dalton (27 March 1992)
3. Ghost Train / Ghost Train (10 April 1992)
4. Chi è Mr. Josephs? / Who is Mr. Josephs (3 April 1992)
5. Caffè Olè / Cafe Olé (10 April 1992)
6. Pescen D'Aprile / Nobody's Fool (17 April 1992)
7. Magia Indiana / Grand Delusion (24 April 1992)
8. Le fidanzate di Lucky Luke / Lucky's Fiancée (22 May 1992)

== Soundtrack ==
The opening theme to the series is the song "Lucky Luke Rides Again", performed by Roger Miller, who also performed the voice of Luke's horse. The main theme is the song "The Lonesomest Cowboy in the West", performed by Arlo Guthrie.
