= Lucky Luke =

Belgian comics series

- Sous le Ciel de l'Ouest (1952), cover of an early softcovered issue

Character information
- First appearance: Spirou (October 1946)

In-story information
- Full name: Lucky Luke (The man who shot faster than his shadow)
- Place of origin: United States
- Partnerships: Jolly Jumper, Rantanplan

Publication information
- Publisher: Dupuis (1949–1967); Dargaud (1968–1988); Lucky Productions (1989–1998); Lucky Comics (1999–present)
Title(s)
Full list
- Formats: Comics album
- Original language: French
- Genre: Western

Creative team
- Writer(s): Morris (1946–1958, 2001); René Goscinny (1955–1977); Various (1980–present)
- Artist(s): Morris (1946–2001); Achdé (2001–present)
- Colorist(s): Vittorio Leonardo (1986–2014); Anne-Marie Ducasse (2003–2010); Mel (2011–present)

Lucky Luke is a Western comic album series created by Belgian cartoonist, Maurice De Bevere, best known by the pen name Morris, in 1946. Morris drew the series and wrote some of the early adventures while his brother, Louis, wrote and co-wrote some other ones until 1955, after which he started collaborating with French writer René Goscinny. Their partnership lasted until Goscinny's death in 1977. Afterwards, Morris collaborated with several other writers until his own death in 2001. Since Morris's death, French artist Achdé has drawn the series, scripted by several successive writers.

The series takes place in the American Old West, and starring the titular Lucky Luke, a street-smart gunslinger known as the "man who shoots faster than his shadow", and his intelligent horse Jolly Jumper. Lucky Luke is pitted against various villains, either fictional or inspired by American history or folklore. The most famous of these are the Dalton Brothers, loosely based on the Dalton Gang of the early 1890s and claimed to be their cousins. The stories are filled with humorous elements parodying the Western genre and satirizing both American and European culture.

Lucky Luke is one of the best-known and best-selling comics series in Europe. It has been translated into 30 languages. 83 albums have appeared in the series as of 2024, and 3 special editions/homages, at first published by Dupuis. From 1968 to 1998 they were published by Dargaud and then by Lucky Productions. Since 2000 they have been published by Lucky Comics. Each story was first serialized in a magazine: in Spirou from 1946 to 1967, in Pilote from 1968 to 1973, in Lucky Luke in 1974–75, in the French edition of Tintin in 1975–76, and in various other magazines since.

The series has also had adaptations in other media, such as animated films and television series, live-action films, video games, toys, and board games. As of 2022, all 82 books in the series' regular albums are available in English.

== Publication history ==
First appearance of Lucky Luke and Jolly Jumper in Arizona 1880 (1946)

Simultaneously a tribute to the mythic Old West and an affectionate parody, the comics were created by Belgian artist Morris (born Kortrijk, 1923), who drew Lucky Luke from 1946 until his death in 2001. The first Lucky Luke adventure, Arizona 1880, appeared in the French version of the Franco-Belgian comics magazine Spirou in October 1946. It later appeared in the Almanach issue of Spirou on 7 December 1946.

After several years of writing the strip himself, Morris began a collaboration with René Goscinny. He was the series writer during what is considered its golden age, starting with the story "Des rails sur la Prairie", published on 25 August 1955 in Spirou, until his death in 1977 (with the exception of "Alerte aux Pieds Bleus"), being usually considered the definitive co-creator of the series. Ending a long run of serial publications in Spirou, the series was shifted to Goscinny's Pilote magazine in 1967 with the story "La Diligence". Later it was taken to Dargaud publisher.

After the death of Goscinny in 1977, several writers succeeded him: including Raymond "Vicq" Antoine, Bob de Groot, Jean Léturgie and Lo Hartog van Banda. At the 1993 Angoulême International Comics Festival, Lucky Luke was given an honorary exhibition.

After Morris' death in 2001, French artist Achdé continued drawing new Lucky Luke stories in collaboration with writers Laurent Gerra, Daniel Pennac and Tonino Benacquista. Since 2016, new albums are scripted by writer Jul.

Lucky Luke comics have been translated into: Afrikaans, Arabic, Bengali, Catalan, Croatian, Czech, Danish, Dutch, English, Estonian, Finnish, German, Greek, Hebrew, Hungarian, Icelandic, Indonesian, Italian, Norwegian, Persian, Polish, Portuguese, Serbian, Slovene, Spanish, Swedish, Tamil, Turkish, Vietnamese, Welsh and Bulgarian.

== Stories ==
=== Overview ===
Although always described as a cowboy, Luke generally acts as a righter of wrongs or bodyguard of some sort, where he excels thanks to his on-hand resourcefulness and incredible gun prowess. A recurring task is that of capturing the bumbling but menacing gangsters the Dalton brothers, Joe, William, Jack and Averell. He rides Jolly Jumper, "the smartest horse in the world" and is often accompanied by prison guard dog Rin Tin Can, "the stupidest dog in the universe", a spoof of Rin Tin Tin.

Luke meets many historical Western figures such as Calamity Jane, Billy the Kid, Judge Roy Bean and Jesse James's gang, and takes part in events such as the guarding of Wells Fargo stagecoaches, the Pony Express, the building of the First Transcontinental Telegraph, the Rush into the Unassigned Lands of Oklahoma, the building of the Statue of liberty, and a tour by French actress Sarah Bernhardt. Some of the books feature a one-page article on the background to the events featured. Goscinny once said that he and Morris tried to base the Lucky Luke adventures on real events whenever possible, but that they would not let the facts get in the way of a funny story.

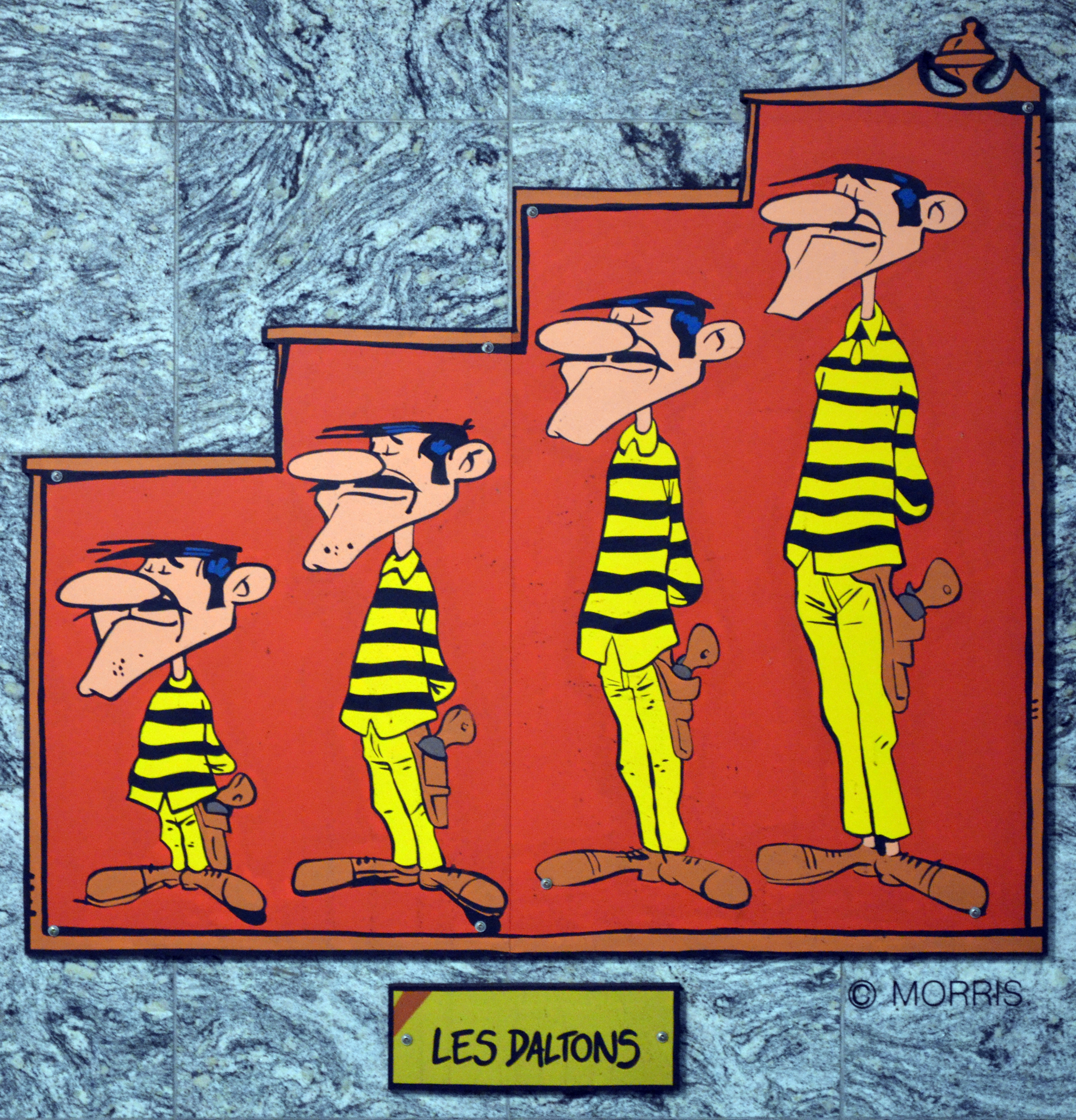
The Dalton gang

The chronology of the albums is deliberately murky, and in most albums no particular year is given. The villains and incidental characters based on real persons lived over most of the mid-to-late-19th century. For example, in the album Daily Star, Lucky Luke meets a young Horace Greeley, prior to his moving to New York in 1831. Judge Roy Bean, who was appointed judge in 1882, appears in another album, and in another album yet, Lucky Luke takes part in the 1892 Coffeyville shootout against the Dalton gang. Lucky Luke himself appears unchanged in all stories.

Except in the first few stories, where he shoots and kills Mad Jim and the old Dalton brothers gang in Coffeyville, Luke is never seen to kill anyone, preferring to disarm people by simply shooting weapons out of their hands.

Phil Defer was killed in the first publication in Le Moustique, but in the later album collection, this was changed into a debilitating shoulder wound.

In the final panel of each story, except the earliest, Lucky Luke rides off alone on Jolly Jumper into the sunset, singing (in English) "I'm a poor lonesome cowboy, and a long way from home...". Luke first said this line in 1949 and it became a tradition afterwards. The song itself is based on a real life cowboy song, collected by John Lomax in Cowboy Songs and Other Frontier Ballads.

=== Historical figures who have appeared in Lucky Luke ===
- Hadji Ali
- P. T. Barnum
- Black Bart
- Frédéric Auguste Bartholdi
- Roy Bean
- Sarah Bernhardt
- Alexei Alexandrovich – fictionalized as Grand Duke Leonid in Le Grand Duc (1973)
- Billy the Kid
- Buffalo Bill
- Newman Haynes Clanton
- Ike, Billy and Phineas Clanton
- The Dalton Gang, who are subsequently replaced by their fictional cousins
- Edwin Drake
- James Buchanan Eads
- Gustave Eiffel
- Virgil, Morgan and Wyatt Earp
- Ulysses S. Grant
- Horace Greeley
- Hatfield and McCoy – fictionalized as O'Haras and O'Timmins in Les Rivaux de Painful Gulch (1962)
- Rutherford B. Hayes
- Doc Holliday
- Victor Hugo
- Frank James
- Jesse James
- Calamity Jane
- Scott Joplin
- Abraham Lincoln
- Jack London
- Albert Londres
- George Maledon
- Emperor Norton – fictionalized as Dean Smith in L'Empereur Smith (1976)
- Annie Oakley
- Caille Brothers
- Isaac C. Parker
- Allan Pinkerton
- Bass Reeves
- Frederic Remington
- Mattie Silks
- Upton Sinclair
- Soapy Smith
- Belle Starr
- Levi Strauss
- Mark Twain
- Brigham Young
- Cole Younger

=== Smoking controversy ===
Lucky Luke's cigarette was replaced with a wisp of straw in 1983.

Morris, who had been criticized over Lucky Luke's cigarette for a long time, answered his critics: "the cigarette is part of the character's profile, just like the pipe of Popeye or Maigret". It is claimed that Morris was forced to remove the cigarettes Lucky Luke smokes from his strip and Lucky Luke who "used to be a heavy smoker", had to give up smoking for "commercial reasons", apparently to "gain access to the American market".

Morris received an award from the World Health Organization in 1988 for replacing Luke's omnipresent cigarette with a wisp of straw in the story Fingers (1983). In the 2007 animated film Tous à l'Ouest: Une aventure de Lucky Luke, Lucky Luke is seen using what appears to be a nicotine patch and mentions that before that he had to "chew on a piece of straw for a while" right after he quit smoking. In the 1994 story Le Pont sur le Mississippi (The Bridge Over the Mississippi), he is seen rolling a cigarette again, although he claims it was just to hide his boredom. And in Sarah Bernhardt (1982), when Bernhardt's cook lights a fire to make a cake, despite Luke's strict orders not to, Luke is seen rolling a cigarette in an irate mood. He then strikes a match, only for it to be blown out by Jolly Jumper, who reminds him of his own "no fire" orders.

== Spin-off series ==
A spin-off series called Rantanplan and starring Luke's dimwitted canine sidekick began in 1987. It has been written over the years by several successive teams of writers and artists. The character also got a 76-episode animated television series in 2006.

A second spin-off series called Kid Lucky was created in 1995, aimed at attracting a younger readership. This starred Luke as a little boy, a format that had been very popular with Spirou. Two albums starring this version of the character were released as part of the main series: Kid Lucky and Oklahoma Jim. These were credited to veteran writer Jean Léturgie and unknown artist Pearce, who was later revealed to be a joint pen name for Yann Lepennetier and Didier Conrad. The series was scrapped due to poor sales and the two albums removed from the official list of Lucky Luke albums. The series was however re-launched in 2011 as Les aventures de Kid Lucky d'après Morris, with Achdé now solely in charge of it. To date, Achdé has written four Kid Lucky albums, L'apprenti Cow-boy, Lasso périlleux, Statue Squaw and Suivez la flèche, released in 2011, 2013, 2015 and 2017, respectively. In June 2020, It was announced Kid Lucky will be adapted into an animated series.

== Collected editions ==
=== By Morris (1949–1958) ===
==== Dupuis Publishing ====
- 1. La Mine d'or de Dick Digger, 1949 (Dick Digger's Gold Mine)
- 2. Rodéo, 1951
- 3. Arizona, 1951
- 4. Sous le ciel de l'Ouest, 1952 (Under the Western Sky)
- 5. Lucky Luke contre Pat Poker, 1953 (Lucky Luke versus Pat Poker)
- 6. Hors-la-loi, 1954 (Outlaws)
- 7. L'Élixir du Dr Doxey, 1955 (Doc Doxey's Elixir)
- 8. Lucky Luke contre Phil Defer, 1956 (Phil Wire)
- 10. Alerte aux Pieds Bleus, 1958 (The Bluefeet are Coming)

=== By Morris & Goscinny (1955–1977) ===
==== Dupuis Publishing ====
- 9. Des rails sur la Prairie, 1957 (Rails on the Prairie)
- 11. Lucky Luke contre Joss Jamon, 1958 (Lucky Luke versus Joss Jamon)
- 12. Les Cousins Dalton, 1958 (The Dalton Cousins)
- 13. Le Juge, 1959 (The Judge)
- 14. Ruée sur l'Oklahoma, 1960 (The Oklahoma Land Rush)
- 15. L'Évasion des Dalton, 1960 (The Daltons' Escape)
- 16. En remontant le Mississippi, 1961 (Travelling Up the Mississippi or Steaming Up the Mississippi)
- 17. Sur la piste des Dalton, 1962 (On the Daltons' Trail)
- 18. À l'ombre des derricks, 1962 (In the Shadow of the Derricks)
- 19. Les Rivaux de Painful Gulch, 1962 (The Rivals of Painful Gulch)
- 20. Billy the Kid, 1962
- 21. Les Collines noires, 1963 (The Black Hills)
- 22. Les Dalton dans le blizzard, 1963 (The Daltons in the Blizzard)
- 23. Les Dalton courent toujours, 1964 (The Daltons Always On The Run)
- 24. La Caravane, 1964 (The Wagon Train)
- 25. La Ville fantôme, 1965 (Ghost Town)
- 26. Les Dalton se rachètent, 1965 (The Daltons Redeem Themselves)
- 27. Le Vingtième de cavalerie, 1965 (The 20th Cavalry)
- 28. L'Escorte, 1966 (The Escort)
- 29. Des barbelés sur la prairie, 1967 (Barbed Wire on the Prairie)
- 30. Calamity Jane, 1967
- 31. Tortillas pour les Dalton, 1967 (Tortillas for the Daltons)

==== Dargaud Publishing ====
- 32. La Diligence, 1968 (The Stagecoach)
- 33. Le Pied-tendre, 1968 (The Tenderfoot)
- 34. Dalton City, 1969
- 35. Jesse James, 1969
- 36. Western Circus, 1970
- 37. Canyon Apache, 1971 (Apache Canyon)
- 38. Ma Dalton, 1971
- 39. Chasseur de primes, 1972 (The Bounty Hunter)
- 40. Le Grand Duc, 1973 (The Grand Duke)
- 41. L'Héritage de Rantanplan, 1973 (Rantanplan's Inheritance or Rin-Tin-Can's Inheritance)
- 42. 7 histoires complètes, 1974 (7 Full Stories or 7 Stories)
- 43. Le Cavalier blanc, 1975 (The Dashing White Cowboy)
- 44. La Guérison des Dalton, 1975 (A Cure for the Daltons)
- 45. L'Empereur Smith, 1976 (Emperor Smith)
- 46. Le Fil qui chante, 1977 (The Singing Wire)
- 50. La Corde du pendu, 1982 (The Hanged Man's Rope or The Hanged Man's Noose)
- 51. Daisy Town, 1983
- 55. La Ballade des Dalton et autres histoires, 1986 (The Daltons' Ballad and Other Stories or The Ballad Of The Daltons And Other Stories).

Between Le Fil qui chante and La Corde du pendu is La Ballade des Dalton, 1978 (The Daltons' Ballad or The Ballad of the Daltons), an adaptation from the animated film.

=== By Morris and various writers (1980–2002) ===
==== Dargaud Publishing ====
- 47. Le Magot des Dalton, 1980, by Vicq (The Daltons' Stash or The Daltons' Loot)
- 48. Le Bandit manchot, 1981, by Bob de Groot (The One-Armed Bandit)
- 49. Sarah Bernhardt, 1982, by Jean Léturgie and Xavier Fauche
- 52. Fingers, 1983, by Lo Hartog Van Banda
- 53. Le Daily Star, 1983, by Jean Léturgie and Xavier Fauche (The Daily Star)
- 54. La Fiancée de Lucky Luke, 1985, by Guy Vidal (Bride of Lucky Luke or Lucky Luke's Fiancee)
- 56. Le Ranch maudit, 1986, by Jean Léturgie, Xavier Fauche and Claude Guylouis (The Cursed Ranch)
- 57. Nitroglycérine, 1987, by Lo Hartog Van Banda (Nitroglycerine)
- 58. L'Alibi, 1987, by Claude Guylouis (The Alibi)
- 59. Le Pony Express, 1988, by Jean Léturgie and Xavier Fauche (The Pony Express)

==== Lucky Productions ====
- 60. L'Amnésie des Dalton, 1991, by Jean Léturgie and Xavier Fauche (The Daltons' Amnesia)
- 61. Chasse aux fantômes, 1992, by Lo Hartog Van Banda (Ghost Hunt)
- 62. Les Dalton à la noce, 1993, by Jean Léturgie and Xavier Fauche (The Wedding Crashers)
- 63. Le Pont sur le Mississippi, 1994, by Jean Léturgie and Xavier Fauche (The Bridge on the Mississippi or Bridge Over the Mississippi)
- 64. Kid Lucky, 1995, by Pearce and Jean Léturgie
- 65. Belle Star, 1995, by Xavier Fauche
- 66. Le Klondike, 1996, by Yann and Jean Léturgie (The Klondike)
- 67. O.K. Corral, 1997, by Eric Adam and Xavier Fauche
- 68. Oklahoma Jim, 1997, by Pearce and Jean Léturgie
- 69. Marcel Dalton, 1998, by Bob de Groot

==== Lucky Comics ====
- 70. Le Prophète, 2000, by Patrick Nordmann (The Prophet)
- 71. L'Artiste peintre, 2001, by Bob de Groot (The Painter or The Artist)
- 72. La Légende de l'Ouest, 2002, by Patrick Nordmann (Legends of the West)

=== By Achdé and various writers (since 2004) ===
==== Lucky Comics ====
- 73. La Belle Province, 2004, by Laurent Gerra (The Beautiful Province)
- 74. La Corde au cou, 2006, by Laurent Gerra (Tying the Knot or From the Gallows to the Altar)
- 75. L'Homme de Washington, 2008, by Laurent Gerra (The Man from Washington)
- 76. Lucky Luke contre Pinkerton, 2010, by Daniel Pennac and Tonino Benacquista (Lucky Luke versus The Pinkertons)
- 77. Cavalier seul, 2012, by Daniel Pennac and Tonino Benacquista (Lone Riders)
- 78. Les tontons Dalton, 2014, by Laurent Gerra and Jacques Pessis (The Dalton Uncles)
- 79. La Terre promise, 2016, by Jul (The Promised Land)
- 80. Un cow-boy à Paris, 2018, by Jul (Cowboy in Paris)
- 81. Un cow-boy dans le Coton, 2020, by Jul (A Cowboy in High Cotton)
- 82. L'Arche de Rantanplan, 2022, by Jul (Rintincan's Ark)
- 83. Un cow-boy sous pression, 2024, by Jul (Trouble Brewing)
- 84. Saint Lucky Luke, 2026, by de Jul & Achdé (Saint Lucky Luke)

==== Kid Lucky spin-off ====
1. L'apprenti Cow-boy, 2011 (Cowboy in Training)
2. Lasso périlleux, 2013 (The Dangerous Lasso)
3. Statue Squaw, 2015
4. Suivez la flèche, 2017 (Follow the Arrow)
5. Kid ou double, 2019 (Kid or Double)

=== Special editions and homages ===
- L' homme qui tua Lucky Luke, 2016, by Matthieu Bonhomme (The Man Who Shot Lucky Luke)
- Jolly Jumper ne répond plus, 2017, by Guillaume Bouzard (Jolly Jumper Stops Responding)
- Lucky Luke sattelt um, 2019, by Mawil (Lucky Luke Saddles Up)
- Lucky Luke: Wanted, 2021, by Matthieu Bonhomme (Wanted Lucky Luke)
- Zarter Schmelz, 2021, by Ralf König (Swiss Bliss).
- Les Indomptés, 2023, by Blutch (Untamed).
- Dakota 1880, 2025, by Brüno (Dakota 1880).
- La longue marche de Lucky Luke, 2026, by Matthieu Bonhomme (The Long Walk of Lucky Luke).

=== English translations ===
Apart from the collections mentioned below, Lucky Luke comics were published in British comic book magazines such as Film Fun Comic or Giggle (in 1967). The Giggle version had Luke's name changed to "Buck Bingo".

Brockhampton Press Ltd, Leicester, began publishing the books in hardcover and softcover, with six titles from 1972 to 1974, translated by Frederick W Nolan. Brockhampton became part of Hodder & Stoughton Ltd in 1976, and under their children's imprint, Knight Books, Hodder published mini-sized paperback editions of the first six books, in 1976 to 1977. In 1980 and 1982, Hodder & Stoughton published three new titles as Hodder Dargaud, as well as reprints of the previous six.

Cinebook Ltd have been publishing English language translations of Lucky Luke in softcover album format since 2006. One new volume is released every two months. In India only, Euro Books, a division of Euro Kids International Ltd. published English versions of 24 Lucky Luke titles in 2009.

In 2019, Cinebook began releasing a hardcover collection of Lucky Luke, published in chronological order featuring three to four original albums per volume together with a vast amount of extras included, titled Lucky Luke – The Complete Collection.

Cinebook also published translations of the two Matthieu Bonhomme homages: Wanted Lucky Luke (2016) and The Man Who Shot Lucky Luke (2021). Untamed by Blutch was published in 2024. Brüno's Dakota 1880 and The Long Walk of Lucky Luke by Bonhomme were both published in 2026.

List of single albums in English

Brockhampton Press (UK)

- Jesse James, 1972
- The Stagecoach, 1972
- Dalton City, 1973
- The Tenderfoot, 1974
- Western Circus, 1974
- Apache Canyon, 1974

Knight Books (UK)

- The Stagecoach, 1976
- Dalton City, 1976
- Jesse James, 1976
- The Tenderfoot, 1976
- Apache Canyon, 1977
- Western Circus, 1977

Hodder Dargaud (UK)

- Ma Dalton, 1980
- Curing the Daltons, 1982
- The Dashing White Cowboy, 1982

Dargaud USA and Canada

- The Stage Coach, US, 1980s
- The Greenhorn, US, 1980s
- Dalton City, US, 1980s
- Jesse James, US, 1980s
- Western Circus, US, 1980s
- Ma Dalton, US, 1980s
- The Dalton Brothers' Analyst, Canada, 1982
- Curing the Daltons, Canada, 1982

Fantasy Flight (US)

- The Stage Coach, 1990s
- Jesse James, 1990s

Ravette Books (UK)

- The Dalton Brothers Memory Game, 1991

Glo'worm (UK)

- Calamity Jane, 1998
- Dalton City, 1998
- Ma Dalton, 1999
- Jesse James, 1998
- The Tenderfoot, 1999
- Western Circus, 2000
- The Dashing White Cowboy, 2000

Cinebook Ltd

1. Billy The Kid, 2006, ISBN 1-905460-11-2
2. Ghost Town, 2006, ISBN 1-905460-12-0
3. Dalton City, 2006, ISBN 1-905460-13-9
4. Jesse James, 2006, ISBN 1-905460-14-7
5. In the Shadow of the Derricks, 2007, ISBN 1-905460-17-1
6. Ma Dalton, 2007, ISBN 978-1-905460-18-2
7. Barbed Wire on the Prairie, 2007, ISBN 978-1-905460-24-3
8. Calamity Jane, 2007, ISBN 978-1-905460-25-0
9. The Wagon Train, 2008, ISBN 978-1-905460-40-3
10. Tortillas for the Daltons, 2008, ISBN 978-1-905460-49-6
11. Western Circus, 2008, ISBN 978-1-905460-55-7
12. The Rivals of Painful Gulch, 2008, ISBN 978-1-905460-60-1
13. The Tenderfoot, 2008, ISBN 978-1-905460-65-6
14. The Dashing White Cowboy, 2008, ISBN 978-1-905460-66-3
15. The Daltons in the Blizzard, 2009, ISBN 978-1-905460-76-2
16. The Black Hills, 2009, ISBN 978-1-905460-83-0
17. Apache Canyon, 2009, ISBN 978-1-905460-92-2
18. The Escort, 2009, ISBN 978-1-905460-98-4
19. On the Daltons' Trail, 2009, ISBN 978-1-84918-007-8
20. The Oklahoma Land Rush, 2009, ISBN 978-1-84918-008-5
21. The 20th Cavalry, 2010, ISBN 978-1-84918-016-0
22. Emperor Smith, 2010, ISBN 978-1-84918-026-9
23. A Cure for the Daltons, 2010, ISBN 978-1-84918-034-4
24. The Judge, 2010, ISBN 978-1-84918-045-0
25. The Stagecoach, 2010, ISBN 978-1-84918-052-8
26. The Bounty Hunter, 2010, ISBN 978-1-84918-059-7
27. Lucky Luke versus Joss Jamon, 2011, ISBN 978-1-84918-071-9
28. The Dalton Cousins, 2011, ISBN 978-1-84918-076-4
29. The Grand Duke, 2011, ISBN 978-1-84918-083-2
30. The Daltons' Escape, 2011, ISBN 978-1-84918-091-7
31. Lucky Luke versus the Pinkertons, 2011, ISBN 978-1-84918-098-6
32. Rails on the Prairie, 2011, ISBN 978-1-84918-104-4
33. The One-Armed Bandit, 2012, ISBN 978-1-84918-111-2
34. The Daltons Always On The Run, 2012, ISBN 978-1-84918-119-8
35. The Singing Wire, 2012, ISBN 978-1-84918-123-5
36. The Daltons Redeem Themselves, 2012, ISBN 978-1-84918-132-7
37. Fingers, 2012, ISBN 978-1-849181389
38. Doc Doxey's Elixir, 2012, ISBN 978-1-849181419
39. The Man from Washington, 2013, ISBN 978-1-849181495
40. Phil Wire, 2013, ISBN 978-1-849181556
41. The Daily Star, 2013, ISBN 978-1-849181600
42. Lone Riders, 2013, ISBN 978-1-849181686
43. The Bluefeet are coming!, 2013, ISBN 978-1-849181730
44. Lucky Luke versus Pat Poker, 2013, ISBN 978-1-849181792
45. Tying the Knot, 2014, ISBN 978-1-849181884
46. The Pony Express, 2014, ISBN 978-1-849181945
47. Outlaws, 2014, ISBN 978-1-849182010
48. Dick Digger's Gold Mine, 2014, ISBN 9781849182089
49. The Daltons' Amnesia, 2014, ISBN 9781849182195
50. Seven Stories, 2014, ISBN 9781849182263
51. The Painter, 2015, ISBN 9781849182416
52. The Beautiful Province, 2015, ISBN 9781849182492
53. Nitroglycerin, 2015, ISBN 9781849182546
54. Rodeo, 2015, ISBN 9781849182591
55. Arizona, 2015, ISBN 9781849182683
56. Under a Western Sky, 2015, ISBN 9781849182737
57. Legends of the West, 2016, ISBN 9781849182911
58. The Daltons' Stash, 2016, ISBN 9781849182980
59. Bride of Lucky Luke, 2016, ISBN 9781849183055
60. The Ballad of the Daltons and other stories, 2016, ISBN 9781849183093
61. Daisy Town, 2016, ISBN 9781849183161
62. The Cursed Ranch, 2016, ISBN 9781849183208
63. Sarah Bernhardt, 2017, ISBN 9781849183444
64. The Wedding Crashers, 2017, ISBN 9781849183482
65. Ghost Hunt, 2017, ISBN 9781849183536
66. The Promised Land, 2017, ISBN 9781849183666
67. Belle Starr, 2018, ISBN 9781849183888
68. Bridge Over the Mississippi, 2018, ISBN 9781849183901
69. Kid Lucky, 2018, ISBN 9781849184069
70. The O.K. Corral, 2018, ISBN 9781849184175
71. A Cowboy in Paris, 2018, ISBN 9781849184311
72. Marcel Dalton, 2019, ISBN 9781849184328
73. The Prophet, 2019, ISBN 9781849184403
74. The Klondike, 2020, ISBN 9781849184960
75. Rin Tin Can's Inheritance, 2020, ISBN 9781849185349
76. Oklahoma Jim, 2020, ISBN 9781849185370
77. A Cowboy in High Cotton, 2020, ISBN 9781849185950
78. The Dalton Uncles, 2021, ISBN 9781800440098
79. Steaming up the Mississippi, 2021, ISBN 9781800440173
80. The Alibi, 2021, ISBN 9781800440388
81. The Hanged Man's Rope and Other Stories, 2022, ISBN 9781800440678
82. Rin Tin Can's Ark, 2022, ISBN 9781800440845
83. Trouble Brewing, 2024, ISBN 9781800441514
84. Saint Lucky Luke, 2027, ISBN 9781800442108

Eurokids (India)

1. The Alibi, 2009, ISBN 978-81-286-2033-1
2. Ghost Hunt, 2009, ISBN 978-81-286-2035-5
3. Kid Lucky, 2009, ISBN 978-81-286-2037-9
4. Oklahoma Jim, 2009, ISBN 978-81-286-2040-9
5. The Prophet, 2009, ISBN 978-81-286-2041-6
6. Belle Star, 2009, ISBN 978-81-286-2038-6
7. The Klondike, 2009, ISBN 978-81-286-2039-3
8. The Pony Express, 2009, ISBN 978-81-286-2034-8
9. Sarah Bernardt, 2009, ISBN 978-81-286-2042-3
10. The bridge on the Mississippi, 2009, ISBN 978-81-286-2036-2
11. The Hanged Man's Rope and other stories, 2009, ISBN 978-81-286-2043-0
12. The Ballad of the Daltons and other stories, 2009, ISBN 978-81-286-2056-0
13. Daisy Town, 2009, ISBN 978-81-286-2044-7
14. Fingers, 2009, ISBN 978-81-286-2045-4
15. Marcel Dalton, 2009, ISBN 978-81-286-2046-1
16. The Artist, 2009, ISBN 978-81-286-2047-8
17. The legend of the west, 2009, ISBN 978-81-286-2048-5
18. The Daily Star, 2009, ISBN 978-81-286-2049-2
19. Lucky Luke's fiancé, 2009, ISBN 978-81-286-2050-8
20. Nitroglycerine, 2009, ISBN 978-81-286-2051-5
21. The Cursed Ranch, 2009, ISBN 978-81-286-2052-2
22. The Beautiful Province, 2009, ISBN 978-81-286-2053-9
23. From the Gallows to the Altar, 2009, ISBN 978-81-286-2054-6
24. The Dalton's Loot, 2009, ISBN 978-81-286-2055-3

Europe Comics

1. The Man Who Shot Lucky Luke, 2016
2. Cowboy in Training, 2017
3. Dangerous Lasso, 2017
4. Statue Squaw, 2017
5. Follow the Arrow, 2019

== In other media ==
DVD cover for the live-action film Lucky Luke, directed by and starring Italian actor Terence Hill

=== Films ===
==== Animation ====
- Goscinny directed and co-produced two animated Lucky Luke films:
  - Daisy Town (1971)
  - La Ballade des Dalton (1978)
- The French company Xilam produced a theatrical animated film: Go West! A Lucky Luke Adventure (5 December 2007)
- In 2026, it was announced that Pan Animation, Ellipse Animation and Belvision Studios are co-developing this new computer-animated film Lucky Luke in Welcome to Fanga Town, with a release planned for 2029.

==== Live-action ====
There are a number of feature adaptations from various countries, including:

- Turkish films:
  - Ret Kid (1970), starring Izzet Günay
  - Atını Seven Kovboy (1975), starring Sadri Alışık
- Italian films, both starring Terence Hill:
  - Lucky Luke (1991)
  - Lucky Luke 2 (1991)
- French films, both produced by Saïd Ben Saïd and Yves Marmion:
  - Les Dalton (2004), featuring Til Schweiger as Lucky Luke (one of the most expensive European films ever made)
  - Lucky Luke (2009), starring French actor Jean Dujardin as Lucky Luke

=== Television ===
In 1983, Hanna-Barbera Productions, France 3, Gaumont, Extrafilm Berlin and Morris collaborated to produce the animated TV series Lucky Luke, which ran for 26 episodes and was based on original album stories. The series' main voice actors were William Callaway as Lucky Luke, Robert Ridgely as Jolly Jumper, Paul Reubens as Bushwack, Frank Welker as Joe Dalton, Rick Dees as Jack Dalton, Fred Travalena as William Dalton, Bob Holt as Averell Dalton, and Mitzi McCall as Ma Dalton. Additional voices were provided by Peter Cullen, Pat Fraley, Barbara Goodson, and Mona Marshall.

In 1991, a new animated series of 26 episodes was produced by IDDH, with the collaboration of Morris, based on album stories not adapted in the prior series.

The 1992 live-action Italian television series, Lucky Luke, also known as The Adventures of Lucky Luke, was based on the films of the previous year and again starred Terence Hill.

In 2001, Xilam produced the 52-episode animated series Les Nouvelles aventures de Lucky Luke (The New Adventures of Lucky Luke). It was made available on an eight-disc DVD set with French and English audio tracks. This series also featured Colonel Custer, who is an Indian-hater and a dwarf in this incarnation. Unlike the two earlier animated series, this series featured original stories.

Xilam produced two further animated series involving Lucky Luke: Rintindumb (2006) and The Daltons (2010).

In June 2020, Dargaud Media (whom previously produced The New Adventures of Lucky Luke and The Daltons) announced a new preschool animated series that following a young version of the comic book character entitled Kid Lucky which is based on the comic strip spin-off of the same name, marking Dargaud Media's in-house Lucky Luke adaptation without the involvement of Xilam with them co-producing alongside Paris-based animation studio Ellipsanime Productions and fellow Belgian animation company Belvision. Dargaud Media and Ellipsanime Productions' fellow Angoulême-based animation unit Ellipse Studio Angoulême and Belgian animation studio DreamWall handled animation & storyboard services alongside Paris-based animation production company Caribara Animation via its Annecy-based building.

A live-action French television series produced by Disney+ and France Télévisions, premiered on Disney+ on March 23, 2026. It consists of 8 episodes.

=== Video games ===
Lucky Luke video games have been released for many platforms, most of them by Infogrames for the European market. Only Game Boy Color and PlayStation versions were released in North America.

A Lucky Luke game was developed for mobile phones by The Mighty Troglodytes. Lucky Luke: Go West was released in Europe for Windows, Wii, and Nintendo DS in late 2007.

In 2013, French publishers Dupuis and Anuman Interactive announced the development of a new Time Management game: Lucky Luke: Transcontinental Railroad (set in the 1860s) for Windows, Mac, iOS, and Android.

- Lucky Luke – Tiger Handheld – 1984
- Lucky Luke: Nitroglycerine – Coktel Vision, C64, Amstrad CPC, Atari ST, MS-DOS, Thomson TO – 1987
- Lucky Luke: The Video Game – Philips Interactive, Philips CD-i – 1996
- Lucky Luke – Infogrames, Game Boy (Europe only) – 1996 and Game Boy Color – May 1999
- Lucky Luke – SNES, MS-DOS, and Windows (Europe only) – October 1997
- Lucky Luke – Infogrames, PlayStation – 1998 and Windows (Europe only) – 2000 as Lucky Luke: On the Dalton's Trail
- Lucky Luke: Desperado Train – Game Boy Color (Europe Only) – 2000 (Infogrames)
- Lucky Luke: Western Fever – Windows and PlayStation (Europe only) – 2001
- Lucky Luke: Wanted! – Game Boy Advance (Europe only) – 11 February 2001 (Infogrames)
- Go West! A Lucky Luke Adventure – DS, Windows, Wii – 2007
- Lucky Luke - Clock — Nintendo Switch — 2026
- Lucky Luke: The Lonesome Cowboy Collection – PlayStation 4, PlayStation 5, Xbox One, Xbox Series X/S, Nintendo Switch, Nintendo Switch 2, Windows – 2027

== Tributes ==
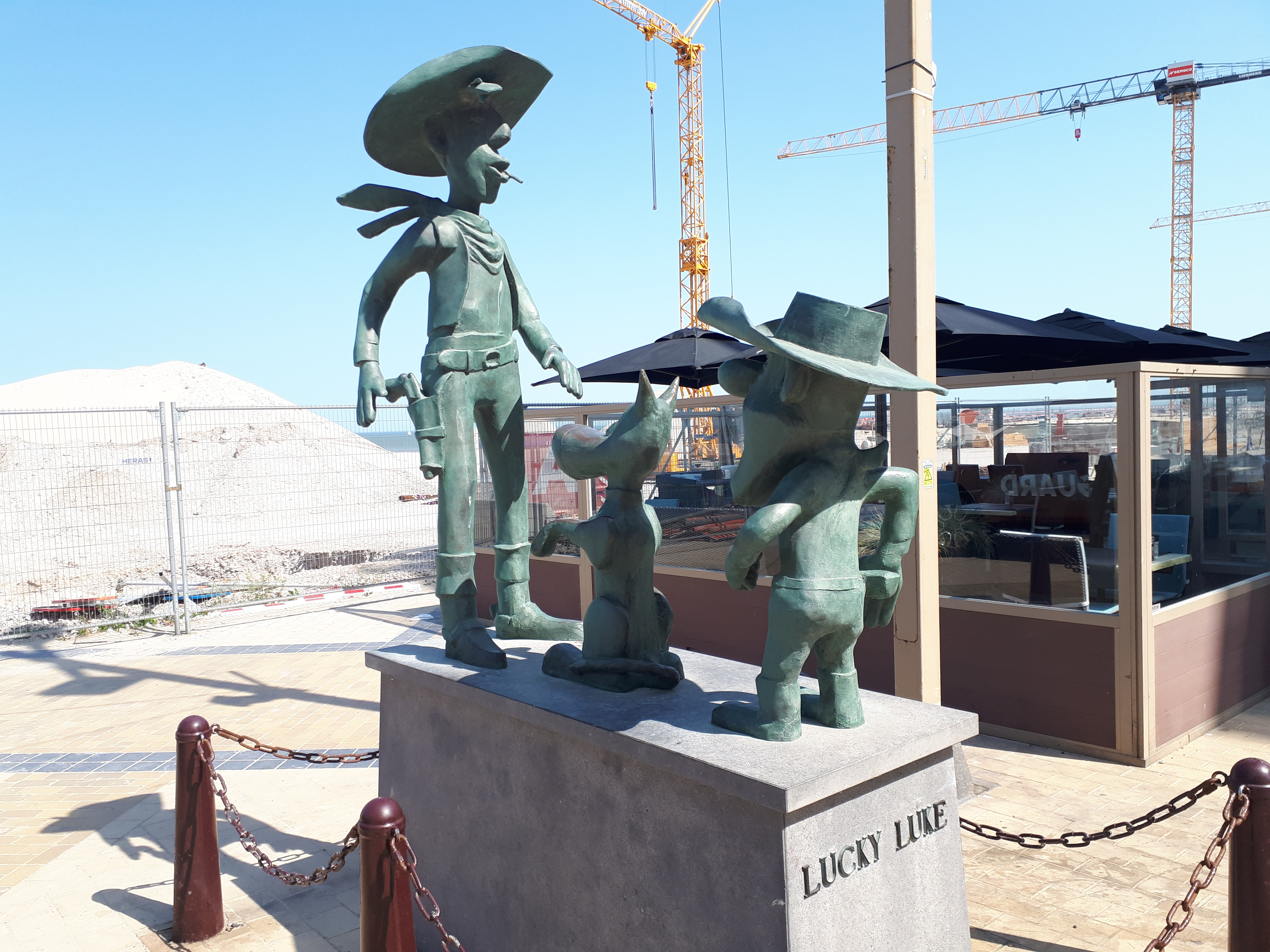
Lucky Luke and Joe Dalton statues in Middelkerke

In the Belgian Comic Strip Center in Brussels, the permanent exhibition pays homage to the pioneers of Belgian comics, with Morris being among them. In the room dedicated to his work, the entry has saloon doors and Luke's shadow can be seen on the floor and on the wall.

In 1992, as part of Brussels' Comic Book Route, a wall in the Rue de la Buandrie/ Washuisstraat in Brussels was dedicated to Lucky Luke. It was designed by D. Vandegeerde and G. Oreopoulos.

Since 2007, the Rue des Pierres/ Steenstraat in Brussels has a commemorative plaque with the name Rue Lucky Luke / Lucky Luke straat placed under the actual street sign.

In Charleroi, Belgium, a statue of Lucky Luke can be seen in Astrid Park. The nearby Charleroi Metro station Parc is also decorated with scenes of Lucky Luke.

In 2000, statues of Lucky Luke, Ratanplan and Joe Dalton were erected in the Jules Van den Heuvelstraat, Middelkerke, Belgium. They were designed by Luc Madou.

In 1993, French rapper MC Solaar released his song "Nouveau Western" with references to Lucky Luke and the Daltons.

Lucky Luke is also referenced in the 2010 Obsidian Entertainment-developed and Bethesda Softworks-published video game Fallout: New Vegas. Posters appear in the game, as well as in some loading screens, stating "There's a new sheriff in town and he's looking for deputies ... Become a part of the human dignity bloc". Accompanying this text is an image of a frontier-era sheriff doing a finger gun motion with both hands. Aside from the star-shaped sheriff badge he wears, the sheriff is dressed identically to Lucky Luke, sporting his trademark white hat, yellow shirt, black vest, and red bandana tied around his neck.

In 2015, Danish reggaeton band Camilo & Grande released a single titled "Lucky Luke", in which they liken their lives to that of Lucky Luke.

In 2022, the Belgian government included a tribute to Lucky Luke in the visa pages of its newly redesigned passport. It features a blank silhouette of Luke and Jolly Jumper in Monument Valley, with the full detail of the characters being revealed under UV light.

== See also ==
- Brussels' Comic Book Route
- Cocco Bill
