= Jolly Jumper =

Horse character in Lucky Luke's comics

Publication information
- First appearance: Arizona 1880 (1946)
- Created by: Morris

In-story information
- Species: Horse

Jolly Jumper is a horse character in the Franco-Belgian comics series Lucky Luke, created by Belgian artist Morris. Described as "the smartest horse in the west" and able to perform tasks such as chess-playing and tightrope walking, Jolly Jumper accompanies his cowboy in their travels across the Wild West, and delivers frequent quips.

Much like Lucky Luke, the English-language alliterating Jolly Jumper is rarely renamed in translated versions. Although in the Greek version of the series, Jolly Jumper is female and is called "Dolly". In the Turkish version the character is called "Düldül".

First appearance of Lucky Luke and Jolly Jumper in Arizona 1880 (1946)

== Publication history ==
Jolly Jumper first appeared alongside Lucky Luke in the story Arizona 1880, published in the Almanach issue of the Franco-Belgian comics magazine Spirou on December 7, 1946. In his earlier appearances, he was more like a real horse, which started to change after René Goscinny became the series' main writer.

== Analysis and reception ==
The absurdity of the intelligent talking horse Jolly Jumper juxtaposed against the appearances of many real historical figures has been described as contributing to the humor and charm of the comic series.

Nándor Bokor described Jolly Jumper as the "true soulmate" of the main character Lucky Luke.

== See also ==
- List of fictional horses

== Sources ==
- Lucky Luke publications in Spirou Archived 2016-03-03 at the Wayback Machine and Pilote Archived 2011-09-17 at the Wayback Machine BDoubliées (in French)
