= Morris (cartoonist) =

Belgian comics artist

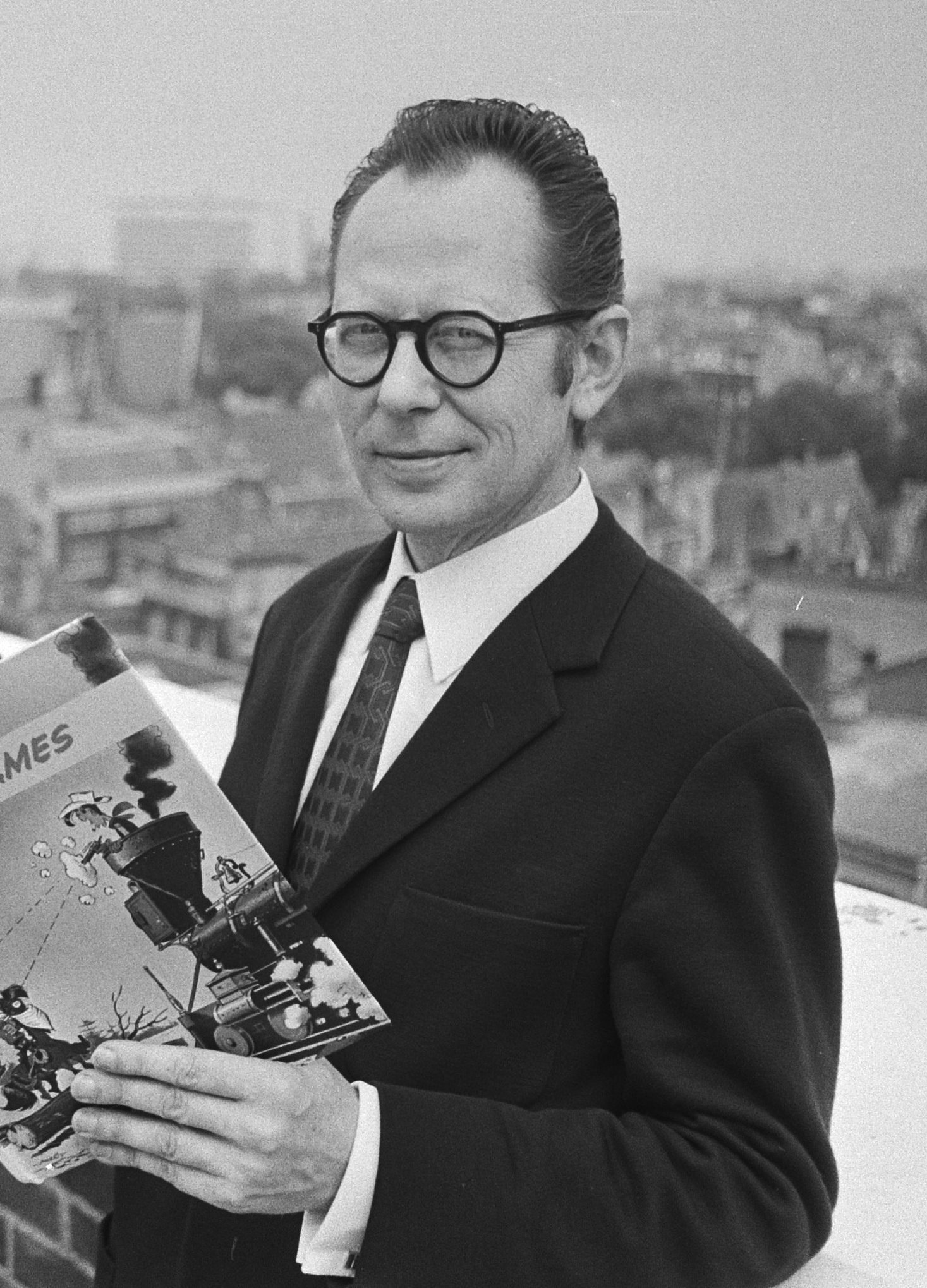
- Morris in 1971
- Born: Maurice De Bevere; 1 December 1923 Kortrijk, Belgium
- Died: 16 July 2001 (aged 77) Brussels, Belgium
- Areas: Cartoonist, Writer, Artist
- Notable works: Lucky Luke
- Awards: Full list

Maurice De Bevere (Dutch: [moːˈriz də ˈbeːvərə]; French: [mɔʁis də bəvɛʁ, moʁ-]; 1 December 1923 – 16 July 2001), better known as Morris, was a Belgian comics artist, illustrator, and the creator of Lucky Luke, a best-selling comic series about a gunslinger in the American Wild West. He was inspired by the adventures of the historic Dalton Gang and other outlaws. It was a best-selling series for more than 50 years, published internationally and translated into 23 languages. He collaborated for two decades with French writer René Goscinny on the series. Morris's pen name is an Anglicized version of Maurice.

== Biography ==
Born in Kortrijk, Belgium, Morris attended the well-known Jesuit college in Aalst. His math teacher told his parents the youth would unfortunately never succeed in life, as he passed the time in class doodling in the margins of his math books. The school uniforms inspired his choices for those of the undertakers in his Lucky Luke cartoon series.

Morris started his career after college drawing at the Compagnie Belge d'Actualités (CBA) animation studios. This short-lived Belgian animation studio is where he met fellow artists Peyo, André Franquin, and Eddy Paape.

After World War II the company folded. Morris worked as an illustrator for Het Laatste Nieuws (The Latest News), a Flemish newspaper, and Le Moustique (The Mosquito), a French-language weekly magazine published by Dupuis. He created some 250 covers and numerous other illustrations for the latter magazine, mainly caricatures of movie stars.

Morris died in 2001 of an embolism following an accidental fall.

=== Lucky Luke ===
In 1946 Morris created Lucky Luke for Spirou, the Franco-Belgian comics magazine published by Dupuis. Lucky Luke is a solitary cowboy who travels across the Wild West helping those in need and aided by his faithful horse, Jolly Jumper. The first adventure, "Arizona 1880", was published in L'Almanach Spirou 1947, released on 7 December 1946.

Morris became one of the central artists of the publication. He was one of the so-called La bande des quatre (Gang of Four), with Jijé, André Franquin, and Will. All four lived and worked for a couple of years at Jijé's studio in Waterloo and became very good friends, inspiring each other artistically.

In 1948 Morris, Jijé, and Franquin travelled to the United States (Will was still too young and had to remain in Belgium). They wanted to get to know the country, see what was left of the Wild West, and meet some American comic artists. Morris stayed the longest of the three, for six years. During his six-year stay in the U.S. Morris met Jack Davis and Harvey Kurtzman and assisted them with founding their Mad magazine at EC Comics. In the U.S. he also met René Goscinny, a French comic artist and writer.

They developed a long professional relationship, with Goscinny having written nearly all the Lucky Luke stories between 1955 and his death in 1977. In the 1950s Goscinny was still fairly unknown, but he would become the most successful comic writer in Europe, first with Lucky Luke and a few years later with his Asterix series. Louis De Bevere, Maurice's brother, a teacher of French at the state school in Veurne, wrote one or more of the Lucky Luke stories.

Aside from his collaboration with Goscinny, Morris's time in the United States was integral to his development, an enormous influence on his later work. He became familiar with American films of the time, and in the following years, Morris introduced many cinematic techniques in his comics, such as freeze-frames and close-ups. Walt Disney's style also influenced him, as evidenced by the very round lines that characterize the early Lucky Luke issues. Many of his characters are clearly based on famous American actors such as Jack Palance, Gary Cooper, W.C. Fields, and William Hart. He also caricatured unexpected figures like actor Louis de Funès and French singer Serge Gainsbourg.

The first 31 Lucky Luke adventures were published by Dupuis. In the late 1960s Morris left Dupuis and Spirou and went to Dargaud and Pilote magazine, which his friend and collaborator Goscinny launched.

In 1983 Hanna-Barbera created 52 Lucky Luke cartoons, increasing the popularity of the series. Fifty-two more animated cartoons were made in the early 1990s, and three live-action films followed. A few video games based on the series were also released, e.g. for PlayStation and Game Boy Color. Lucky Luke is the best-selling European comics series ever, with more than 300 million copies sold, and published in more than thirty languages.

Unlike many of his contemporaries, Morris never worked on several series. He made numerous illustrations for stories in the 1940s and 1950s. In the 1990s he created Rantanplan, a spin-off from Lucky Luke, starring the dumbest dog in the West.

In 2005 Morris was ranked 79th for The Greatest Belgian in the French-speaking community.

== Awards ==
- 1972: Grand Prix Saint-Michel, Brussels, Belgium
- 1992: Angoulême International Comics Festival, 20th anniversary Grand Prix de la ville d'Angoulême
