= Pierre Olaf =

French actor (1928–1995)

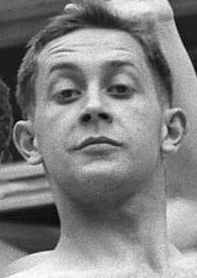
Image of Pierre Olaf

Pierre Olaf (né Pierre-Olaf Trivier; 14 July 1928 – 16 September 1995) was a French actor, cabaret artist, and clown. He first achieved success as a stage actor in Paris in the musical revues of Robert Dhéry. He achieved particular acclaim in Dhéry's Jupon Volé (1954) and La Plume de Ma Tante (1955); the latter of which served as an international vehicle for him with productions in Paris, London's West End (1955-1958), and in New York City on Broadway (1958-1960). In 1959 he and the rest of the cast of La Plume de Ma Tante were awarded a non-competitive Special Tony Award. In 1962 he was nominated for a competitive Tony Award for his portrayal of Jacquot in the original Broadway production of Bob Merrill's Carnival! (1961).

Olaf began his career in French cinema in the 1950s. A friend of French director and writer Jean Renoir, he appeared in stage, television, and film works written and directed by him. He was a featured interviewee in the 1993 documentary film on Renoir. He also appeared in many films associated with Dhéry, and performed in both French and American films and television programs during the 1960s, 1970s, and 1980s. In 1962 he was a regular performer on Perry Como's Kraft Music Hall. Some of his notable Hollywood film credits include the Tony Curtis comedy Wild and Wonderful (1964), the James Garner and Dick Van Dyke comedy The Art of Love, and the Academy Award winning musical film Camelot (1967). One of his final screen credits was as Captain Rondicherry in the 1989 television miniseries Around the World in 80 Days made for CBS television.

== Early career in French cinema and theatre ==
Born Pierre-Olaf Trivier in Caudéran in the Gironde department of Bordeaux, he began his professional acting career on the stage in his late teens. He excelled in comedy roles; aided in that capacity by his small stature and an "owlish face". He first appeared in French cinema in his early 20s, beginning with the role of Sanchez in Marcel Aboulker's Le Trésor des Pieds-Nickelés (1950). Other French films he appeared in during his early career included Miquette et sa mère (1950), Trois femmes (1952), Soyez les bienvenus (1953), Mam'zelle Nitouche (1954), and Ah ! les belles bacchantes (1954).

On the stage, Olaf was frequently used in the comedic musical revues of Robert Dhéry in Paris during his early career. The French director Jean Renoir cast Olaf as Roberto, a whistling pierrot, in his 1955 film French Cancan, after seeing his performance in Dhéry's 1954 Paris revue Jupon Volé. Renoir became a close friend with Olaf during the making of this film, a friendship which lasted until Renoir's death in 1979. Olaf starred as Philippe in Renoir's 1955 play Orvet at the Théâtre de la Renaissance.

Of Dhéry musical reviews, the most highly regarded on the international stage was La Plume de Ma Tante; which was adapted for the West End's Garrick Theatre from its original French language Paris production by English songwriter Ross Parker. Premiering in London in 1955, the production ran for two and a half years before transferring to Broadway's Royale Theatre in 1958. Olaf portrayed multiple comedic roles in both the West End and Broadway productions, and was one of the production's main comedic talents. In 1957 he appeared on BBC Television in "Jack Hylton presents The Robert Dhéry Show" which included adaptations from the West End musical among other material by Dhéry. The entire cast of La Plume de Ma Tante, including Olaf, was awarded a Special Tony Award in 1959.

== Carnival! ==
Following the Broadway production of La Plume de Ma Tante closed in December 1960, Dhéry remained in the United States and took the part of Jacquot in the original Broadway production of Bob Merrill's Carnival! starring Anna Maria Alberghetti, Jerry Orbach, and Kaye Ballard. The musical premiered at the National Theatre in Washington, D.C. for out of town tryout performances in March 1961. After further tryouts in Philadelphia, the production moved to Broadway's Imperial Theatre where it opened on April 12, 1961. The part of Jacquot was a critical success for Olaf who received a nomination for the Tony Award for Best Featured Actor in a Musical in 1962. A review in Billboard magazine stated the following about his performance:

"The real showman of the group is Pierre Olaf, the great French clown from 'La Plume de Ma Tante'. Olaf contribute's 'Carnival's' most effective production number, a bright exhilarating turn titled 'Grand Imperial Cirque de Paris'."

Olaf recorded the role of Jacquot on the 1961 original cast album of the musical. That Broadway cast recording reached No. 1 on the Billboard album chart, dated 17 July 1961. Olaf later reprised the role of Jacquot at New York City Center in 1968 with the New York City Center Light Opera Company.

== Work in American television and film ==
In late 1961 Olaf went to Hollywood to make his first appearances on American television and film; beginning with the role of a clown in a television adaptation of Leonid Andreyev's He Who Gets Slapped, starring Richard Basehart and Julie Harris. He portrayed the title role in the December 1961 television film The Enchanted Nutcracker, co-starring Carol Lawrence and Robert Goulet. In 1962, he had a recurring role in comedy sketches in Perry Como's television program Kraft Music Hall. In 1966, he portrayed the recurring role of Milan Petros in the television series The Trials of O'Brien. He portrayed roles in multiple television miniseries, including Lace (1984, as Serge), The Free Frenchman (1989, Georges Auget), and Around the World in 80 Days (1989, as Captain Rondicherry).

His film roles include Jacquot in Wild and Wonderful (1964), Inspector Carnot in The Art of Love (1965), Petros in Too Many Thieves (1967), Dap in Camelot (1967), Chef in Don't Drink the Water (1969), Cozzier in The Gamblers (1970), Lacoste in Irish Whiskey Rebellion (1972), a Courtier in Cheech & Chong's The Corsican Brothers (1984), and the priest in American Dreamer (1984). He also starred in the 1966 Warner Brothers short film By the Sea.

== Other stage work in the United States ==
Olaf remained involved with theatre while venturing into television and film. He starred as Passepartout in the world premiere of Sig Herzig, Sammy Fain and Victor Young's musical adaptation of Around the World in Eighty Days at the Saint Louis Municipal Opera in June 1962. That production co-starred Cyril Ritchard, and it transferred to the Starlight Theatre in Kansas City, Missouri after its Saint Louis run the following August. In between those production, Olaf starred in Frank Lowe's stage adaptation of James Thurber's The 13 Clocks at the Barter Theatre in Abingdon, Virginia in July 1962.

Olaf was a featured entertainer at the 1964 New York World's Fair. That same year he returned to Broadway as Jerome Lahutte in Yves Jamiaque's play A Murderer Among Us, and appeared Off-Broadway as Ferdinand Goddard in Cy Young's That Hat!, a musical adaptation of the farce The Italian Straw Hat. Neither work was well received, with critics blaming the scripts for not giving Olaf material to display his comedic talent. In 1965 he starred as Raphael Bonnardon in the world premiere of Jean-Pierre Aumont's Madame Mousse with Molly Picon in the title role at the Westport Country Playhouse.

== Other work in French cinema, television, and theatre ==
In 1964, Olaf reunited with Robert Dhéry to make the film Allez France!, which screened in the United States two years later with the English language title The Counterfeit Constable. He worked with Dhery again a decade later on Vos gueules, les mouettes!

In 1970, he reunited with Renoir to make the 1970 television film-series The Little Theatre of Jean Renoir; portraying Gustave in "La Cireuse électrique". He was a featured interviewee in the 1993 documentary film on Renoir.

In 1984, Olaf portrayed Bob Cratchit in a French language adaptation of Charles Dickens's A Christmas Carol for TF1 television. In 1985, he created the role of Abdul in the premiere of Sir Peter Ustinov’s play Comme de mal entendu at the Théâtre de la Madeleine.

== Later life and death ==
In his latter years, Olaf lived in a small apartment in Montmartre, Paris which had window views that overlooked the Sacré-Cœur. He died in Paris on 16 September 1995, aged 67.
