= Ronald Fraser (actor) =

British actor (1930–1997)

- Fraser in Crooks in Cloisters 1964
- Born: Ronald Gordon Fraser; 11 April 1930; Ashton-under-Lyne, Lancashire, England
- Died: 13 March 1997 (aged 66); Hampstead, London, England
- Occupation: Actor
- Years active: 1957–1997
- Spouse: Elizabeth Howe (m. 1956; div. 1964)
- Children: 2

Ronald Gordon Fraser (11 April 1930 – 13 March 1997) was a British character actor, who appeared in numerous British plays, films and television shows from the 1950s to the 1990s.

His credits include The Long and the Short and the Tall (1961), The Best of Enemies (1961), Flight of the Phoenix (1965), The Avengers (1965), The Killing of Sister George (1968), The Misfit (1970–1971), Pygmalion (1973), Swallows and Amazons (1974), Come Play With Me (1977), The Wild Geese (1978), Spooner's Patch (1979), Trail of the Pink Panther (1982), Tangiers (1982), Absolute Beginners (1986), Minder (1985–1989), Scandal (1989), Let Him Have It (1991), Taggart (1992), and The Young Indiana Jones Chronicles (1993).

== Background ==
Ronald Fraser was born in Ashton-under-Lyne, Lancashire, the son of an interior decorator and builder from Scotland. He attended Ashton-under-Lyne Grammar School. He was further educated in Scotland and did national service as a lieutenant in the Seaforth Highlanders. Whilst serving in Benghazi, North Africa, he appeared in the Terence Rattigan comic play French Without Tears.

He trained as an actor at RADA, graduating in 1953. He appeared at Glasgow's Citizens' Theatre, and joined the Old Vic repertory company in 1954, making his first London appearance in The Good Sailor, a stage adaptation of Herman Melville's novel, Billy Budd.

In the West End, he appeared in The Long and the Short and the Tall (1959), The Ginger Man, The Singular Man, Androcles and the Lion (1961), The Showing Up of Blanco Posnet (1961), Purple Dust by Seán O'Casey, Entertaining Mr Sloane, Joseph Papp's production of The Pirates of Penzance and High Society. He also played Falstaff in a production of The Merry Wives of Windsor at the Open Air Theatre, Regent's Park. His only Broadway show was the flop La Grosse Valise by Robert Dhéry, Gérard Calvi and Harold Rome.

He appeared in numerous television roles from 1954, and in nearly 50 films from 1957, mostly in comedies. He was notable as Basil "Badger" Allenby-Johnson in the 1970s television series The Misfit (1970–1971). In 1996 Fraser voiced the chief judge in The Willows in Winter.

== Selected filmography ==
=== Film credits ===
Year	Title	Role	Notes
1959	Bobbikins	Sailor Joe	Uncredited
1960	There Was a Crooked Man	Gen. Cummings	
1960	The Sundowners	Ocker	
1961	The Long and the Short and the Tall	L / Cpl. Macleish	
1961	Don't Bother to Knock	Fred	
1961	The Best of Enemies	Perfect	
1961	Raising the Wind		
1961	The Hellions	Frank	As Ronnie Fraser
1962	The Pot Carriers	Red Band	
1962	The Girl on the Boat	Colonel	Uncredited
1962	In Search of the Castaways	Guard at Dockyard Gate	
1962	Private Potter	Doctor	
1963	The Punch and Judy Man	Mayor Palmer	
1963	The V.I.P.s	Joslin	
1963	Girl in the Headlines	Sgt. Saunders	
1964	The Beauty Jungle	Walter Carey	
1964	Victim Five	Inspector Lean	
1964	Crooks in Cloisters	Walt	
1964	The Counterfeit Constable	Sergent Timothy Reagan	
1965	Flight of the Phoenix	Sergeant Watson	
1967	The Whisperers	Charlie Ross	
1967	Fathom	Colonel Campbell	
1968	Sebastian	Toby	
1968	The Killing of Sister George	Leo Lockhart	
1969	Sinful Davey	McNab	
1969	The Bed Sitting Room	The Army	
1970	Too Late the Hero	Pvt. Campbell	
1970	The Rise and Rise of Michael Rimmer	Tom Hutchinson	
1971	The Magnificent Seven Deadly Sins	George	Segment "Wrath"
1972	Ooh... You Are Awful	Reggie Campbell Peek	
1972	Rentadick	Major Upton	
1974	Swallows and Amazons	Uncle Jim	
1974	Percy's Progress	Bleeker	
1975	Paper Tiger	Sergeant Forster	
1977	Hardcore	Marty	
1977	Come Play With Me	Slasher	
1978	The Wild Geese	Jock McTaggart	
1982	Trail of the Pink Panther	Dr. Longet	
1985	Tangiers	Jenkins	
1986	Absolute Beginners	Amberley Drove	
1989	Scandal	Justice Marshall	
1991	Let Him Have It	Niven's Judge	
1993	The Mystery of Edwin Drood	Dean	

=== Television credits ===
Year	Title	Role	Notes
1957-1958	BBC Sunday Night Theatre	Flute/Bill Meadows	2 episodes
1958-1967	ITV Play of the Week	Various	5 episodes
1958-1973	Armchair Theatre	Various	6 episodes
1959	The Invisible Man	Sharp	Episode: "Jailbreak"
1961	Danger Man	Giuseppe Morelli	Episode: "The Brothers"
1961	Spycatcher	Winters	Episode: "Stooping to Conquer"
1962	Drama 61-67	Raven	Episode: "Drama '62: The Lonesome Road"
1962	Out of This World	Oscar Raebone	Episode: "The Tycoons"
1962	The DuPont Show of the Week	Dr. James Mathers	Episode: The Ordeal of Dr. Shannon
1962-1963	ITV Television Playhouse	Various	3 episodes
1962-1974	Comedy Playhouse	Various	5 episodes
1963	Sykes and a...		1 episode
1964	Festival	Tom Broadbent	Episode: "John Bull's Other Island"
1965	ITV Sunday Night Drama	Harry Best	Episode: "Suspense Hour: Nightmare on Instalments"
1965	Armchair Mystery Theatre	Ridgeway	Episode: "The Hunter"
1965	The Avengers	Sir Horace Winslip	Episode: "The Gravediggers"
1966	This Man Craig	Councillor McLaren	Episode: "Sticks and Stones"
1967	Theatre 625	Apthorpe	Episode: "Sword of Honor"
1968	The Troubleshooters	Wallace Nichols	Episode: "The Dispossessed"
1968-1974	BBC Play of the Month	Various	3 episodes
1968-1977	ITV Playhouse	Various	4 episodes
1970-1971	The Misfit	Basil Allenby-Johnson	
1972	Omnibus	Max Beerbohm	Episode: "Max Beerbohm Remembers"
1973	The Rivals of Sherlock Holmes	Horrocks	Episode: "The Looting of the Specie Room"
1974	Francis Durbridge's "Melissa"	Felix Hepburn	3 episodes
1976	The Sweeney	Titus Oates	Episode: "Selected Target"
1976	Star Maidens	Kipple	Episode: "The Perfect Couple"
1977	Mr. Big	Mr. Oldenshaw	2 episodes
1977	The Dick Emery Show		1 episode
1978	Pennies From Heaven	Major Archibald Paxville	Episode: "Painting the Clouds"
1978	The Famous Five	Mr. Barling	Episode: "Five Go to Smuggler's Top"
1978	The Bass Player and the Blonde	Charlie	3 episodes
1979	Spooner's Patch	Inspector Spooner	
1981	Brideshead Revisited	Red-Haired Man	2 episodes
1983	The Lady Is a Tramp	First Tramp	1 episode
1985	Screen Two	Barnaby Tucker	Episode: "In the Secret State"
1985	The Practice	Dr. Reginald Biddy	10 episodes
1985-1989	Minder	Self-Inflicted Sid/Albert Goddard	2 episodes
1986-1991	Lovejoy	Michael Edwards/Drummer	2 episodes
1987	Q.E.D.	Dr. Watson	Episode: "Murder on Bluebell Lane"
1987	Fortunes of War	Commander Sheppy	Episode: "Romania: January 1, 1940"
1987-1989	Life Without George	Harold Chambers	
1988	City Lights	Uncle Jimmy	Episode: "The Melvin Diaries"
1988	Doctor Who	Joseph C.	Serial: "The Happiness Patrol"
1990	Arena	Chauffeur	Episode: "Oblomov"
1990	The Comic Strip Presents	Geoffrey	Episode: "Oxford"
1990	The Play on One	Timothy Apcar	Episode: "Obituaries"
1990	Boon	Len Drumgold	Episode: "Burning Ambition"
1992	Taggart	Angus Collins	Episode: "Violent Delights"
1992	Virtual Murder	Van Helsing	Episode: "A Dream of Dracula"
1992	The Blackheath Poisonings	Doctor Porter	Miniseries
1993	The Young Indiana Jones Chronicles	Donald	Episode: "Young Indiana Jones and the Phantom Train of Doom"
1994	Class Act	Judge MacVitie	1 episode
1996	The Net	Commander Kershaw	Episode: "A Blind Eye"
1996	Madson	Walter Gardner	1 episode
1996	The Fortunes and Misfortunes of Moll Flanders	Sir Richard Gregory	Episode 4
1996	The Willows in Winter	Chief Judge (voice)	TV movie, as Ronnie Fraser

== Personal life ==
Fraser was a resident of Hampstead, London. He was married from 1956 to 1964 to Elizabeth Howe, and the couple had two daughters.

He died of a haemorrhage, aged 66, in London on 13 March 1997.
