= Jacques Legras =

French actor

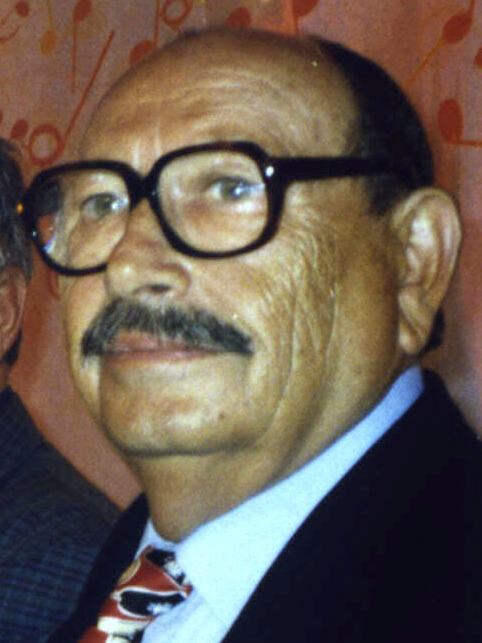
Legras before 1991.

Jacques Legras (16 October 1924 – 15 March 2006) was a French actor.

== Selected filmography ==
- Branquignol (1949) - Le domestique qui crie trop fort
- The Patron (1950) - Un témoin
- Bernard and the Lion (1951) - Paul
- Love Is Not a Sin (1952) - Vaugerel - membre de l'association
- La demoiselle et son revenant (1952) - Le duelliste
- The Three Musketeers (1953)
- Les hommes ne pensent qu'à ça (1954) - Le marié
- Service Entrance (1954) - Un client de Dumény (uncredited)
- Ah! Les belles bacchantes (1954) - Legras, l'annonceur du spectacle
- The Impossible Mr. Pipelet (1955) - Un pompier (uncredited)
- La Belle Américaine (1961) - Riri, le cafetier
- Une souris chez les hommes (1964) - Un inspecteur
- The Counterfeit Constable (1964) - L'agent Ben / Senephleph Mendoza
- Les gros bras (1964) - L'expert en bijouterie
- La grosse caisse (1965) - Le facteur
- La tête du client (1965) - Le chauffeur de taxi
- La communale (1965)
- How to Keep the Red Lamp Burning (1965) - Un client suisse (segment "Fermeture, La") (uncredited)
- Lady L (1965) - Un inspecteur de police
- Your Money or Your Life (1966) - Tapu
- Trois enfants dans le désordre (1966) - Barnachon
- The Big Restaurant (1966) - L'agent de police
- Atout coeur à Tokyo pour OSS 117 (1966) - M. Chan
- Woman Times Seven (1967) - Salesman (segment "Snow") (uncredited)
- The Little Bather (1968) - Henri Castagnier (le curé)
- Faites donc plaisir aux amis (1969) - L'inspecteur Ludovic Grossard
- L'auvergnat et l'autobus (1969) - Le clerc
- Hibernatus (1969) - L'avocat
- L'ardoise (1970) - Le passant (uncredited)
- L'étalon (1970) - Pointard
- Un été sauvage (1970)
- The Lady in the Car with Glasses and a Gun (1970) - Policeman
- The Married Couple of the Year Two (1971) - Le préposé au divorce
- Les Assassins de l'ordre (1971) - The inspector at the antique shop
- On est toujours trop bon avec les femmes (1971) - Le receveur (uncredited)
- Daisy Town (1971) - (voice)
- Sex-shop (1972) - Albert
- Les Charlots font l'Espagne (1972) - Le conducteur
- Elle court, elle court la banlieue (1973) - Le représentant
- A Slightly Pregnant Man (1973) - Leboeuf, le marchand de télévisions
- Le permis de conduire (1974) - L'examinateur / L'expert
- The Holes (1974) - Bougras, l'hirondelle obséquieuse
- The Four Charlots Musketeers (1974) - Alexandre Dumas
- La gueule de l'emploi (1974) - Jacques Lelièvre
- The Four Charlots Musketeers 2 (1974) - Alexandre Dumas
- Vos gueules les mouettes! (1974) - M. Le Marlec, député-maire, le recteur de Saint-On
- L'intrépide (1975) - Le contrôleur des wagons-lits
- Catherine et Cie (1975)
- Le trouble-fesses (1976)
- Le roi des bricoleurs (1977) - Sirop
- Drôles de zèbres (1977) - Jardine, le directeur de l'hôtel
- Parisian Life (1977) - Alphonse
- La Ballade des Dalton (1978) - Augustus Betting, le notaire (voice)
- Le beaujolais nouveau est arrivé (1978)
- Heroes Are Not Wet Behind the Ears (1978) - L'agent étranger
- The Associate (1979) - Inspecteur Pernais
- Le piège à cons (1979) - Le commissaire Roubert
- La Gueule de l'autre (1979) - Hervé Bidart
- Mais qu'est-ce que j'ai fait au bon Dieu pour avoir une femme qui boit dans les cafés avec les hommes ? (1980) - Maurice Vasselin, l'agent du fisc
- Le jour se lève et les conneries commencent (1981) - Charles Landrieux
- Les Bidasses aux grandes manœuvres (1981) - Colonel allemand
- Te marre pas... c'est pour rire! (1982) - L'huissier
- N'oublie pas ton père au vestiaire... (1982) - Le policier
- L'été de nos quinze ans (1983) - Le 'satyre' du cinéma
- Les malheurs d'Octavie (1983) - Gonzague, directeur des services secrets
- Mon curé chez les Thaïlandaises (1983) - Monsieur Ping
- Vous habitez chez vos parents? (1983) - Gaspard
- Retenez Moi...Ou Je Fais Un Malheur (1984) - Le chef d'orchestre
- Vive le fric ! (1985) - Le percepteur
- La gitane (1986) - Pilu
- Corps z'a corps (1988) - Thiriet
- How to Make Love to a Negro Without Getting Tired (1989) - Vendeur de machines à écrire
- Robin des mers (1998) - Jacques Pénalty
- Vidange (1998) - Le procureur
