= Ah! Les belles bacchantes =

- Directed by: Jean Loubignac
- Written by: Francis Blanche; Robert Dhéry
- Produced by: Optimax Films, Lux Films (France)
- Starring: Robert Dhéry; Louis de Funès
- Music by: Gérard Calvi
- Distributed by: Lux
- Release date: 15 October 1954 (France)
- Running time: 95 minutes
- Country: France
- Language: French

Ah! Les belles bacchantes (English: Ah! The nice moustache), is a French comedy film from 1954, directed by Jean Loubignac, written by Francis Blanche, starring Robert Dhéry and Louis de Funès. The film is also known under the titles: Femmes de Paris and Peek-a-boo (USA). It is a first color comedy film with Louis de Funès using Agfacolor process.

== Plot ==
Robert Dhéry, director of the theatre 'Folies-Méricourt' advertises his latest show entitled Ah! These beautiful Women. Police inspector Michel Leboeuf, intrigued and alarmed by bold posters, decides to investigate.

== Cast ==
- Robert Dhéry : Robert Dhéry / The man playing cello
- Louis de Funès : Michel Lebœuf, the police inspector
- Colette Brosset : herself, as a dancer
- Raymond Bussières : the plumber
- Rosine Luguet : Rosine
- Roger Caccia :
- Jacqueline Maillan : herself, as the director of Folies Méricourt
- Francis Blanche : Garibaldo Trouchet
- Jacques Jouanneau : Joseph Delmar
- Jacques Legras : a monk
- Roger Saget : a monk
- Robert Destain : Olaf Destain, singing "Rêverie militaire"
- Guy Pierrault : a musician (uncredited)
- Michel Serrault : a musician
- Marthe Serres : Marthe Serres, pianist
