= The Little Bather =

Le Petit Baigneur
- Directed by: Robert Dhéry
- Written by: Robert Dhéry
- Produced by: Robert Dorfmann; Raymond Danon; Bertrand Javal
- Starring: Louis de Funès; Robert Dhéry; Colette Brosset; Andréa Parisy; Michel Galabru; Franco Fabrizi; Pierre Tornade; Jacques Legras
- Cinematography: Jean Tournier
- Music by: Gérard Calvi
- Distributed by: Valoria Films
- Release date: 22 March 1968 (France)
- Running time: 96 minutes (France); 82 minutes (Germany)
- Countries: France; Italy
- Language: French
- Budget: FRF 7,2 million

The Little Bather (French: Le Petit Baigneur), is a French comedy film from 1968, directed and written by Robert Dhéry, starring Louis de Funès and Andréa Parisy.

== Cast ==
- Louis de Funès : Louis-Philippe Fourchaume
- Robert Dhéry : André Castagnier
- Andréa Parisy : Marie-Beatrice Fourchaume, spouse of Louis-Philippe
- Colette Brosset : Charlotte Castagnier, sister of André
- Franco Fabrizi : Marcello Cacciaperotti
- Jacques Legras : L'abbé Henri Castagnier, a brother of André
- Michel Galabru : Scipion, the brother-in-law of André
- Pierre Tornade : Jean-Baptiste Castagnier, a brother of André
- Henri Génès : Joseph
- Roger Caccia : Rémi Vigoret (the churchwarden organist)
- Pierre Dac : minister
- Robert Rollis : Sailor

== Reception ==
The film was the highest-grossing in France in 1968.
