= Brosset =

Brosset is a surname. Notable people with the surname include:

- Colette Brosset (1922–2007), French actress, writer, and choreographer
- Marie-Félicité Brosset (1802–1880), French orientalist
