= La Belle Américaine =

1961 film

La belle américaine
- Theatrical release poster
- Directed by: Robert Dhéry
- Written by: Robert Dhéry; Pierre Tchernia; Alfred Adam
- Produced by: Henri Diamant-Berger; Marcel Maurey
- Starring: Robert Dhéry; Colette Brosset
- Cinematography: Ghislain Cloquet
- Edited by: Albert Jurgenson
- Music by: Gérard Calvi
- Production companies: CCFC; Le Film d'Art; Corflor; Panorama Films
- Distributed by: Compagnie Franco-Coloniale Cinématographique (CFCC)
- Release date: 29 September 1961 (France)
- Running time: 95 minutes
- Countries: France; Italy
- Language: French
- Budget: $350,000

La Belle Américaine (lit. 'The Beautiful American'), known under the English-language title The American Beauty, is a French 1961 comedy film, directed by and starring Robert Dhéry, who also co-wrote the script with Pierre Tchernia and Alfred Adam. The film features an ensemble cast with multiple cameos by familiar French performers, including many frequent Dhéry collaborators such as his wife Colette Brosset, and Louis de Funès in a dual role.

The story follows a working-class man who stumbles into owning a luxury car, leading to a series of predicaments; it mixes the typical slapstick humor of Robert Dhéry's productions with a satirical observation of France's post-war economic boom and social modernization. The title refers not to a person but to the American car that sets the story in motion.

== Plot ==
Factory worker Marcel Perrignon lives a quiet life in a friendly Paris suburb with his wife Paulette and his brother-in-law, Pierrot, who sells Paulette's handcrafted ice cream and candies. In need of a new vehicle, Marcel considers buying a battered old motorcycle from his friend Alfred, until Paulette spots an ad for a luxury Oldsmobile being sold for a pittance.

The seller is the wealthy Mrs. Lucanzas, who has discovered that her recently deceased husband was cheating on her with his young secretary, Simone. She is disposing of her husband's beloved car for a paltry sum as a form of posthumous revenge, and also to prevent Simone from seizing it. Marcel, unable to believe his good fortune, eagerly buys the spectacular vehicle.

Marcel is initially delighted by the status his new car brings. However, the bargain marks the beginning of a disastrous chain of events. That a factory worker should own such an expensive car raises the suspicions of the local police, who launch an investigation into Marcel's assets. When Marcel drives his new ride to work, his boss is infuriated that a subordinate owns a flashier vehicle than himself. Viralot, the factory's petty human resources manager, quickly manufactures a pretext to fire Marcel.

Now unemployed, Marcel tries to improve his fortunes by entering his Oldsmobile in an upscale car show. However, the contest turns into a disaster when Marcel and Paulette's large dog wreaks havoc in the middle of the event. The debacle is broadcast on television, catching the attention of Simone, who recognizes the car and decides to reclaim what was promised to her. Simone pesters and attempts to seduce Marcel, trying to get him to sell her the car, but to no avail. Marcel ends up locked inside his own trunk and is then abandoned by Simone in the middle of nowhere, only to be unwittingly freed by a car thief.

Marcel later experiences another series of misunderstandings and mishaps. His car gives him unexpected access to high-society events, and he is mistakenly admitted to an embassy reception where he strikes up an unlikely friendship with a cabinet minister. He later loses his car and ultimately gets arrested for theft the moment he recovers it, finding himself at odds with Viralot's twin brother, an equally petty police officer.

Marcel ends up clearing his name and retrieving the vehicle, while impressing his neighbors who discover that he has become friends with a member of the government. Later, as Paulette parks the car, she accidentally destroys Pierrot's ice cream cart. Marcel then decides to convert his luxury car into their brand-new, eye-catching ice cream trailer.

== Cast ==
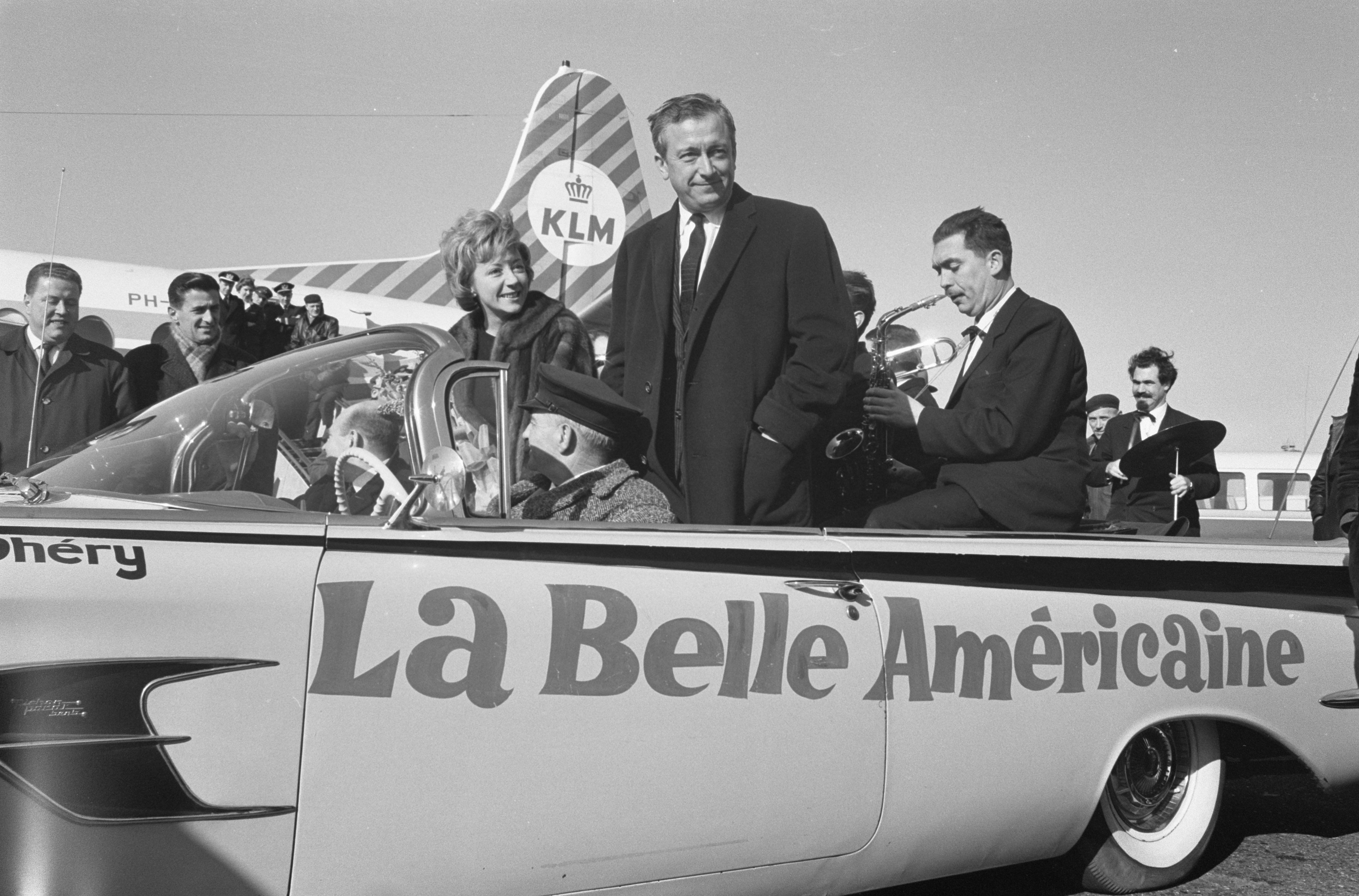
Director and star Robert Dhéry promoting the film, with his wife and co-star Colette Brosset

- Robert Dhéry as Marcel Perrignon
- Colette Brosset as Paulette Perrignon
- Christian Marin as Pierrot
- Alfred Adam as Alfred
- Louis de Funès as the Viralot brothers
- Bernard Lavalette as the cabinet minister
- Jacques Legras as Riri, the cafe owner
- Robert Rollis as the hairdresser
- Annie Ducaux as Mrs Lucanzas
- Éliane d'Almeida as Simone
- Michel Serrault as Chauveau aka Veau-froid, the tramp
- Claude Piéplu as the attorney
- Jacques Fabbri as the fat man
- Jean Lefebvre as Chougnasse, the chief accountant
- Jean Richard as the spectacled locksmith
- Pierre Dac as the colonel
- Max Favalelli as the ambassador
- Jacques Balutin as Balutin
- Robert Burnier as Houche
- Bernard Dhéran as Mr. Jean
- Jean Carmet as the car thief
- Roger Pierre as the snobbish sports car driver
- Jean-Marc Thibault as the effete man
- Christian Duvaleix as the priest
- Fernand Raynaud as himself in a comedy sketch (on a TV show)
- Pierre Tchernia as himself

== Production ==
The idea for the film came from journalist Pierre Tchernia, who pitched it to Robert Dhéry in 1957. However, Dhéry was busy at the time with his musical La Plume de Ma Tante, which toured internationally, including to the United States. He could only start production of the film in 1961, once the musical's U.S. tour had wrapped. The car featured in the film was shipped directly from the United States.

Principal photography took place in the Paris metropolitan area. Dhéry employed a large ensemble cast, including various members of his Branquignols comedy troupe. Another of his frequent collaborators who worked on the film was the composer Gérard Calvi.

== Reception and legacy ==
The film was a box-office hit in France, where it sold 4.1 million tickets and ranked 9th at the box-office for 1961. It was also successful internationally.

Upon release, Jean de Baroncelli of Le Monde wrote that, while not all the gags were equally funny, the film was praiseworthy for its good spirits and its inventive, good-natured, and occasionally poetic humor, devoid of malice and enlivened by social observations. In a later review, Aurélien Ferenczi of Télérama described La Belle Américaine as a clever and endearing portrait of 1960s France and the economic boom era. A 2021 Blu-ray review said the film was dated but not in a bad way, and remained highly enjoyable as a classic of French comedy. In a 2011 article, French urbanism scholar Olivier Ratouis mentioned the film's relevance as a satire of France's post-war modernization and of the resulting clash between French working-class culture and American-style consumerism, exemplified here by the luxury car.

== Accolade ==
- Honorary Award at 1962 Thessaloniki International Film Festival, tied with Divorce Italian Style

== Home video ==
The film was released on DVD in 2003, then on Blu-ray in 2021. It was also released on various streaming services, including Canal+, Orange, Apple TV and Amazon Prime.
