= Jean Richard (actor) =

French actor, comedian, and circus entrepreneur

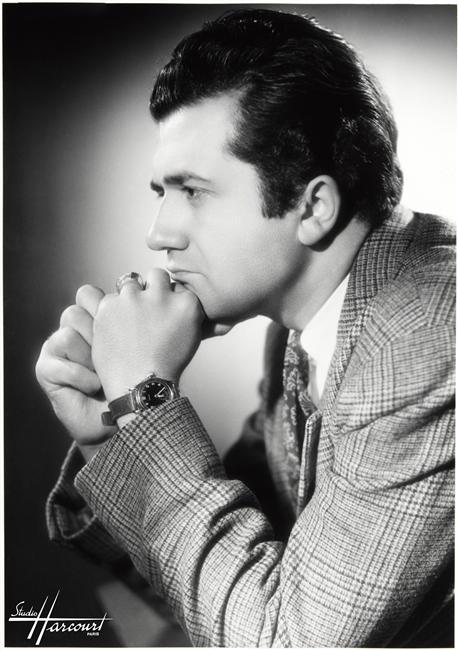
- Jean Richard in 1949 (Studio Harcourt).
- Born: 18 April 1921; Bessines, France
- Died: 12 December 2001 (aged 80); Senlis, France
- Occupations: Actor, comedian, entrepreneur

Jean Richard (18 April 1921 – 12 December 2001) was a French actor, comedian, and circus entrepreneur. He is best remembered for his role as Georges Simenon's Maigret in the eponymous French television series, which he played for more than twenty years, and for his circus activities.

Richard was born in Bessines, Deux-Sevres. In the 1970s–1980s, he owned and managed three major circuses, two theme parks near Paris, La Mer de Sable and La Vallée des Peaux-Rouges, and a private zoo, Ermenoville Zoo, at his property in Ermenonville, Oise. He died on 12 December 2001 in Senlis, aged 80.

== Filmography ==
- 1947: Six heures à perdre (directed by Alex Joffé Jean Lévitte) – Le sergent de ville
- 1949: Mission in Tangier (directed by André Hunebelle) – Le président
- 1949: I Like Only You – Un passager de l'avion
- 1950: King Pandora (directed by André Berthomieu) – Quichenette
- 1950: Adémaï au poteau-frontière (directed by Paul Colline)
- 1951: The King of the Bla Bla Bla – Jacques
- 1951: Bernard and the Lion (directed by Robert Dhéry) – Le brigadier
- 1951: Le passage de Vénus
- 1952: Le Costaud des Batignolles (directed by Guy Lacourt) – L'inspecteur de police
- 1952: The Seven Deadly Sins – Le paysan (segment "Gourmandise, La / Gluttony")
- 1952: La Demoiselle et son revenant (directed by Marc Allégret) – Ricard
- 1952: Drôle de noce (directed by Léo Joannon) – Joseph Bonhomme
- 1953: Deux de l'escadrille (directed by Maurice Labro) – Pierre Dourdan – dit 'Saucisse'
- 1953: Wonderful Mentality (directed by André Berthomieu) – Honoré Bonvalet
- 1953: Week-end à Paris (directed by Gordon Parry)
- 1953: His Father's Portrait (directed by André Berthomieu) – Paul
- 1953: Cinema d'altri tempi – Pasquale
- 1954: Royal Affairs in Versailles (directed by Sacha Guitry) – Du Croisy / Tartuffe
- 1954: Service Entrance (directed by Carlo Rim) – Jules Béchard
- 1954: Scènes de ménage – Des Rillettes
- 1954: The Cheerful Squadron – Il soldato Laperrine
- 1954: Les Deux font la paire (directed by André Berthomieu) – Achille Baluchet
- 1954: Casta Diva (directed by Carmine Gallone) – Domenico Fiorillo
- 1955: Chéri-Bibi (directed by Marcello Pagliero) – Chéri-bibi / Maxime du Touchais
- 1955: Madelon (directed by Jean Boyer) – Antoine Pichot
- 1955: Elena and Her Men (directed by Jean Renoir) – Hector
- 1956: La vie est belle – L'employé
- 1956: Short Head (directed by Norbert Carbonnaux) – Ferdinan Galiveau, éleveur de volailles à Parthenay
- 1957: We at Champignol (directed by Jean Bastia) – Claudius Binoche
- 1957: The Bear's Skin (directed by Claude Boissol) – Commissaire Étienne Ledru
- 1957: C'est arrivé à 36 chandelles – Jean Richard (uncredited)
- 1957: Les Truands (directed by Carlo Rim) – Alexandre Benoit
- 1958: En bordée (directed by Pierre Chevalier) – Prosper Cartahu
- 1958: Life Together (directed by Clément Duhour) – André Le Lorrain
- 1959: Cigarettes, Whiskey and Wild Women – Le client assommé qui demande du wisky (uncredited)
- 1959: The Gendarme of Champignol (directed by Jean Bastia) – Claudius Binoche
- 1959: The Bureaucrats (directed by Henri Diamant-Berger) – Boudin
- 1959: Vous n'avez rien à déclarer? (directed by Clément Duhour) – Frontignac
- 1959: Arrêtez le massacre (directed by André Hunebelle) – Antoine Martin
- 1959: Mon pote le gitan (directed by François Gir) – Pittuiti
- 1959: The Goose of Sedan (directed by Helmut Käutner) – Leon Riffard
- 1959: Certains l'aiment froide (directed by Jean Bastia and Guy Lionel) – Jérôme Valmorin
- 1960: Tête folle (directed by Robert Vernay)
- 1960: Candide ou l'optimisme au XXe siècle – Le trafiquant du marché noir / Black Marketeer
- 1960: Les Tortillards (directed by Jean Bastia) – César Beauminet
- 1960: Les Fortiches (directed by Georges Combret) – Dédé
- 1961: The Fenouillard Family (directed by Yves Robert) – Agénor Fenouillard
- 1961: Ma femme est une panthère (directed by Raymond Bailly) – Roger
- 1961: La Belle Américaine (directed by Robert Dhéry) – le serrurier
- 1961: It Can't Always Be Caviar (directed by Géza von Radványi) – Siméon
- 1961: This Time It Must Be Caviar (directed by Géza von Radványi) – Siméon
- 1962: War of the Buttons (directed by Yves Robert) – Lebrac's father
- 1962: Tartarin of Tarascon (directed by Francis Blanche) – Le directeur du cirque 'Mitaine'
- 1962: Moonlight in Maubeuge (directed by Jean Chérasse) – Philibert
- 1962: We Will Go to Deauville (directed by Francis Rigaud) – Le plombier – M. Simeon
- 1962: Du mouron pour les petits oiseaux (directed by Marcel Carné) – Louis – le boucher
- 1963: The Bamboo Stroke (directed by Jean Boyer) – Albert
- 1963: Sweet and Sour (directed by Jacques Baratier) – Lepetit (le nounou 2)
- 1963: Bebert and the Train (directed by Yves Robert) – M. Martin
- 1964: Clémentine chérie (directed by Pierre Chevalier) – Auguste
- 1964: Jealous as a Tiger (directed by Darry Cowl) – Le monsieur à la voiture accidentée
- 1964: Allez France (directed by Robert Dhéry and Pierre Tchernia) – Un français dans le bus
- 1964: Comment épouser un premier ministre (directed by Michel Boisrond) – Le promoteur
- 1964: Le Dernier tiercé (directed by Richard Pottier) – Laredon
- 1965: La Bonne occase (directed by Michel Drach)
- 1965: Black Humor – Polyte – segment 1 'La Bestiole'
- 1965: Les Mordus de Paris – M. Durand
- 1965: La Corde au cou (directed by Joseph Lisbona) – Arthur
- 1965: The Double Bed – Father
- 1965: La tête du client (directed by Jacques Poitrenaud) – Docteur Tannait
- 1965: L'Or du duc (directed by Jacques Baratier)
- 1965: How to Keep the Red Lamp Burning (directed by Gilles Grangier and Georges Lautner) – Paul Arnaud (segment "Bons vivants, Les")
- 1965: The Lace Wars (directed by René Clair) – Le Prince de Beaulieu
- 1966: Le Caïd de Champignol (directed by Jean Bastia) – Claudius Binoche
- 1966: San Antonio - Sale temps pour les mouches (directed by Guy Lefranc) – L'inspecteur principal Bérurier
- 1967: The Oldest Profession (directed by Claude Autant-Lara and Mauro Bolognini) – Le commissaire du peuple (segment "Mademoiselle Mimi")
- 1967: Bang Bang (directed by Serge Piolet) – Paulo
- 1967: Demeure chaste et pure
- 1967: Cecile est morte (directed by Claude Barma)
- 1968: Béru et ces dames (directed by Guy Lefranc) – L'inspecteur principal Bérurier
- 1969: L'Auvergnat et l'Autobus – Jean Richard
- 1969: La Maison de campagne (directed by Jean Girault) – Bertrand Boiselier
- 1969: Du blé en liasses – Bauchard
- 1972: Le Viager (directed by Pierre Tchernia) – Jo (un voyou) (cameo)
- 1981: Signé Furax (directed by Marc Simenon) – Maigret
