= Pierre Tornade =

French actor

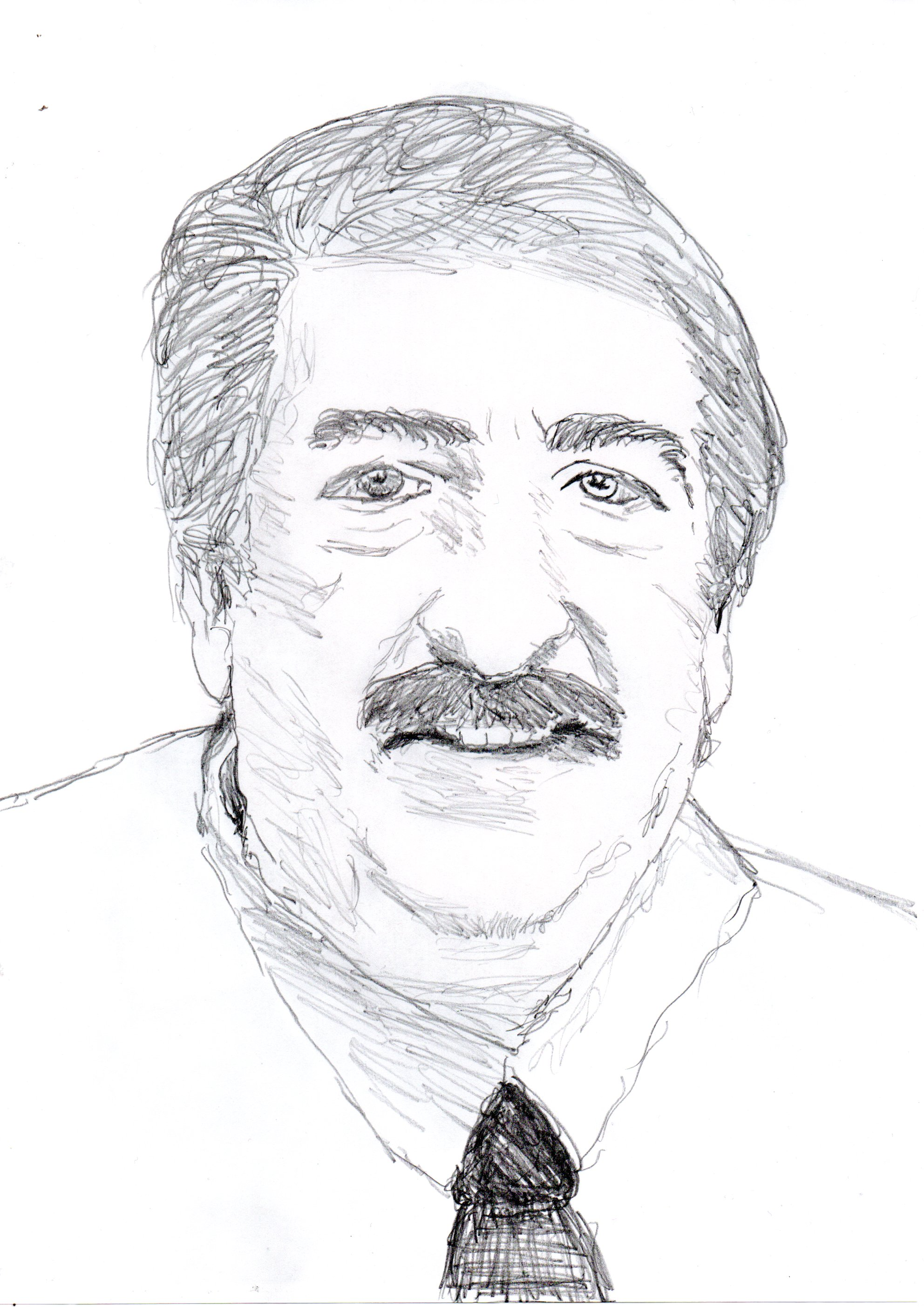
- Born: Pierre Tournadre; 21 January 1930; Bort-les-Orgues, Corrèze, France
- Died: 7 March 2012 (aged 82); Rambouillet, Yvelines, France
- Occupation: Actor
- Years active: 1956–2005

Pierre Tornade (21 January 1930 – 7 March 2012) was a French actor known for his work in film, television, and theatre. He appeared in more than 120 films and television shows between 1956 and 1998.

== Biography ==
He was born Pierre Tournadre on 21 January 1930 in Bort-les-Orgues in the department of Corrèze. He began his theatrical career at 25 in Elle est folle, Carole at the théâtre du Palais-Royal. In 1956, he played in the musical comedy Irma la douce by Alexandre Breffort and Marguerite Monnot and then made his film debut in Les Truands, where he adopted his stage name, Tornade. The next year, he played a theater role in Pericles, Prince of Tyre before joining the Branquignols troupe of Robert Dhéry, which also included Jean Lefebvre, Michel Serrault and Micheline Dax.

He then became in demand on television and appeared in several sitcoms such as Thierry la Fronde (1963), Le Chevalier d'Harmental (1966), Les Sept de l'escalier quinze B (1967) and Les Dossiers de l'agence O (1968). Because of his tall and imposing stature, he often appeared as a policeman or a soldier. His most famous roles were as the victim's father The Common Man (1975), Captain Dumont in Now Where Did the 7th Company Get to? (1973) and its sequels, and commissioner Florimond Faroux on the series Nestor Burma.

A famous voice actor, he was heard as village chief Vitalstatistix in animated films Asterix the Gaul (1967), Asterix and Cleopatra (1968) and The Twelve Tasks of Asterix (1976). He later voiced Averell Dalton in Lucky Luke animated films Daisy Town (1971) and La Ballade des Dalton (1978) and Lucky Luke the Lucky Cowboy (1983). He also voiced Obelix in four other Asterix animated films, including Asterix Versus Caesar (1985), Asterix in Britain (1986), Asterix and the Big Fight (1989) and Asterix Conquers America (1994).

He was named Chevalier (Knight) of the National Order of Merit in 1996. Tornade died on 7 March 2012 in Rambouillet hospital after several days in a coma. He had fallen accidentally in the stairway of his Yvelines residence the previous week and had been comatose since then.

== Filmography ==
| Year | Title | Role | Director | Notes |
|---|---|---|---|---|
| 1956 | Les Truands | Minister | Carlo Rim | |
| 1957 | Comme un cheveu sur la soupe | Butler | Maurice Régamey | |
| 1959 | Nina | Inspector | Jean Boyer | |
| 1963 | Bébert et l'Omnibus | Policeman | Yves Robert | |
| 1963 | L'honorable Stanislas, agent secret | Inspector | Jean-Charles Dudrumet | |
| 1964 | The Counterfeit Constable | Supporter in the bus | Robert Dhéry | |
| 1964 | The Gorillas | Policeman | Jean Girault | |
| 1965 | Gendarme in New York | Doctor | Jean Girault | |
| 1965 | Les Baratineurs | Thès | Francis Rigaud | |
| 1966 | Monnaie de singe | Prison guard | Yves Robert | |
| 1966 | The Big Restaurant | Butler | Jacques Besnard | |
| 1966 | Monsieur le président-directeur général | Adjudant | Jean Girault | |
| 1966 | The Oldest Profession | Removal man | Claude Autant-Lara | |
| 1966 | Tender Scoundrel | Garage customer | Jean Becker | |
| 1966 | Trois enfants dans le désordre | Faction agent | Léo Joannon | |
| 1967 | The Night of the Generals | Orderly | Anatole Litvak | |
| 1967 | The Little Bather | Jean-Baptiste Castagnier | Robert Dhéry | |
| 1968 | The Little Bather | Le gardien de phare | Robert Dhéry | |
| 1968 | Un drôle de colonel | Un inspecteur | Jean Girault | |
| 1968 | Salut Berthe ! | Père Fauvel | Guy Lefranc | |
| 1968 | Le tatoué | Police chief | Denys de La Patellière | |
| 1968 | Béru et ces dames | Un agent de police | Guy Lefranc | |
| 1969 | Faites donc plaisir aux amis | Léon - le mari trompé | | |
| 1969 | The Devil by the Tail | Schwartz, un gangster | Philippe de Broca | |
| 1969 | The Brain | Belgian soldier | Gérard Oury | Uncredited |
| 1969 | L'Auvergnat et l'Autobus | Grosswiller, a businessman | Guy Lefranc | |
| 1969 | Trois hommes sur un cheval | Jo Gabardine | Marcel Moussy | |
| 1971 | L'Explosion | Léopold | Marc Simenon | |
| 1972 | Un cave | Farmer | Gilles Grangier | |
| 1973 | La Raison du plus fou | First biker | François Reichenbach | |
| 1973 | I Don't Know Much, But I'll Say Everything | Police officer | Pierre Richard | |
| 1973 | Now Where Did the 7th Company Get to? | Captain Dumont | Robert Lamoureux | |
| 1974 | Antoine and Sebastian | Max | Étienne Périer | |
| 1974 | Le permis de conduire | Le directeur de l'agence bancaire | Jean Girault | |
| 1974 | Le Permis de conduire | Bank director | Jean Girault | |
| 1974 | Vos gueules, les mouettes ! | Captain | Robert Dhéry | |
| 1974 | Impossible Is Not French | Albert Lombard | Robert Lamoureux | |
| 1975 | Raging Fists | Jo, the bar owner | Éric Le Hung | |
| 1975 | The Common Man | Colin | Yves Boisset | |
| 1975 | Soldat Duroc, ça va être ta fête | Sergeant Lapointe | Michel Gérard | |
| 1975 | Opération Lady Marlène | Commander Mouinot | Robert Lamoureux | |
| 1975 | The Seventh Company Has Been Found | Captain Dumont | Robert Lamoureux | |
| 1975 | Adieu poulet | Commissaire Pignol | Pierre Granier-Deferre | |
| 1976 | Oublie-moi, Mandoline | Jean-Paul Tardu | Michel Wyn | |
| 1976 | Le Jour de gloire | Mayor | Jacques Besnard | |
| 1977 | Dis bonjour à la dame | Robert Ferry | Michel Gérard | |
| 1977 | Arrête ton char... bidasse! | Captain Marcus | Michel Gérard | |
| 1978 | Général... nous voilà ! | Julien Berger | Jacques Besnard | |
| 1979 | C'est dingue... mais on y va | Arthur Beyssac | Michel Gérard | |
| 1981 | L'oeil du maître | Le parachutiste | Stéphane Kurc | |
| 1981 | Le Chêne d'Allouville / Ils sont fous ces Normands | Mayor Henri Brainville | Serge Pénard | |
| 1981 | Signé Furax | Obélisque agent | Marc Simenon | |
| 1982 | Toutes griffes dehors | Barbazan | Michel Boisrond | |
| 1983 | Salut la puce | Alfred | Richard Balducci | |
| 1984 | Fort Saganne | Charles's father | Alain Corneau | |
| 1986 | Didi Drives Me Crazy | Commissaire Bontemps | Wigbert Wicker | |
| 1986 | À notre regrettable époux | Radetsky | Serge Korber | |
| 1988 | Les Gauloises blondes | Le chef Biturix | Jean Jabely | |

== Voice actor ==
=== Film dubbing ===
| Year | Title | Role | Director |
|---|---|---|---|
| 1972 | The Godfather | Luca Brasi | Francis Ford Coppola |
| 1973 | High Plains Drifter | Sheriff Dan Shaw | Clint Eastwood |

=== Animated films ===
| Year | English title | Original title | Role | Notes |
|---|---|---|---|---|
| 1967 | Asterix the Gaul | Astérix le Gaulois | Vitalstatistix / Merchant | Voice |
| 1968 | Asterix and Cleopatra | Astérix et Cléopâtre | Edifis / Vitalstatistix / Mercenary | Voice |
| 1971 | Daisy Town | Lucky Luke | Averell Dalton | Voice |
| 1976 | The Twelve Tasks of Asterix | Les douze travaux d'Astérix | Vitalstatistix | Voice |
| 1978 | La Ballade des Dalton | La Ballade des Dalton | Averell Dalton | Voice |
| 1983 | Lucky Luke the Lucky Cowboy | Les Dalton en Cavale | Averell Dalton / Baker / Butcher | Voice |
| 1985 | Asterix Versus Caesar | Astérix et la surprise de César | Obelix | Voice |
| 1986 | Asterix in Britain | Astérix chez les Bretons | Obelix | Voice |
| 1989 | Asterix and the Big Fight | Astérix et le coup du menhir | Obelix | Voice |
| 1994 | Asterix Conquers America | Astérix et les Indiens | Obelix | Voice |

=== Television series ===
| Year | Title | Role |
|---|---|---|
| 1963–1966 | Thierry la Fronde | Taillevent (episodes 32–48) / Arnaut (episode 20) |
| 1976–1981 | The Muppet Show | Link Hogthrob / Statler |

=== Animated series ===
| Year | Title | Role | Note |
|---|---|---|---|
| 1983–1984 | Lucky Luke | Averell Dalton | |
| 1989 | Wowser | Wowser | |
| 1989 | Jungle Book Shōnen Mowgli | Baloo | French voice |
| 1991–1992 | Lucky Luke | Averell Dalton | |

=== Video games ===
| Year | Title | Voice |
|---|---|---|
| 2004 | Asterix & Obelix XXL | Obelix |
| 2005 | Asterix & Obelix XXL 2: Mission: Las Vegum | Obelix |
