= La demoiselle et son revenant =

1952 film

- Directed by: Marc Allégret
- Screenplay by: Roger Vadim; Gaston Bonheur; Philippe de Rothschild
- Produced by: André Halley des Fontaines
- Starring: Robert Dhéry
- Cinematography: Léonce-Henri Burel
- Edited by: Suzanne de Troye
- Music by: Gérard Calvi
- Distributed by: Alliance Générale de Distribution Cinématographique (AGDC)
- Release date: 1952
- Running time: 87 minutes
- Country: France
- Language: French

La demoiselle et son revenant is a 1952 French film directed by Marc Allégret and written by Roger Vadim.

== Cast ==
- Robert Dhéry as Jules Petitpas
- Annick Morice as Rosette
- Félix Oudart as Pompignan de Beauminet
- Catherine Fonteney as Hortense de Beauminet
- Henri Vilbert as Ledru
- Jean Richard as Ricard
- Kieron Moore as l'Américain
- Roland Armontel as le pharmacien
- Jacqueline Huet as Mathilde
- Germaine Grainval as Berthe
- Amena Ilami as Virginie
- Jacky Gencel as Marcelin
- Marcelle Hainia as la grand-mère
- Maurice Schutz as le doyen
- Jacques de Féraudy as l'académicien
- Jacques Legras as le duelliste
- Christian Marquand as le zouave
