= The Counterfeit Constable =

1964 French film by Robert Dhéry

- Directed by: Robert Dhéry; Pierre Tchernia
- Written by: Colette Brosset; Aubrey Cash; Robert Dhéry; Jean L'Hôte; Francis O'Neill; Pierre Tchernia; Suzanne Wiesenfeld
- Produced by: Henri Diamant-Berger
- Starring: Robert Dhéry; Ronald Fraser; Diana Dors
- Cinematography: Jean Tournier
- Edited by: Albert Jurgenson
- Music by: Gérard Calvi
- Production company: Compagnie Industrielle et Commerciale Cinématographique
- Distributed by: S.N. Prodis
- Release date: 10 October 1964
- Running time: 90 minutes
- Country: France
- Language: French

The Counterfeit Constable (French: Allez France!) is a 1964 French comedy film directed by Robert Dhéry and Pierre Tchernia and starring Ronald Fraser, Diana Dors and Arthur Mullard.

== Plot ==
A French rugby supporter, in England for a match at Twickenham, is accidentally elbowed in the face and loses two teeth. He goes to the dentist who fits new teeth and tells him he mustn't open his mouth for two hours, to allow the cement holding them to set properly. He starts to wait, and in the waiting room he sees the uniform of another patient, who's a policeman. He tries it on for fun, and while wearing it by sheer chance he saves Diana Dors, a movie star who lives next door. He is congratulated by police chiefs who take him for a true police officer. He can't tell them he isn't because he can't open his mouth and besides, he doesn't speak English. He becomes lost in London, and many misunderstandings and misadventures follow. And to make matters worse he needs to return home to France urgently as he is due to be married.

== Main cast ==
- Robert Dhéry as Henri Martineau
- Colette Brosset as Lady Yvette Brisburn "Vévette"
- Diana Dors as herself
- Ronald Fraser as Sergent Timothy Reagan
- Henri Génès as Gros Max
- Jean Lefebvre as le supporter saoul avec le coq
- Jean Carmet as le porte drapeau
- Bernard Cribbins as Bob, l'agent 202
- Jean Richard as un français dans le bus
- Raymond Bussières as un français dans le bus
- Pierre Tornade as un français dans le bus
- Richard Vernon as Lord Brisburn
- Catherine Sola as Nicole
- Percy Herbert as l'agent Baxter
- Amy Dalby as Mrs. Throttle
- Robert Rollis as le supporter avec le bonnet tricolore
- Colin Blakely as l'aveugle
- Colin Gordon as le dentiste W. Martin
- Georgina Cookson as L'assistante du dentiste
- Robert Burnier as le supporter tarbais
- Robert Destain as le supporter cinéaste
- Pierre Doris as un français dans le bus
- Mark Lester as Gérald
- Arthur Mullard as le malfaiteur
- Godfrey Quigley as Inspecteur Savory
- Margaret Whiting as la femme de l'agent 202
- Pierre Olaf as le standardiste du commissariat
- Reg Lye as Le chauffeur de taxi fatigué

== Production ==
Diana Dors was then living in Los Angeles but returned to Europe to make the film.

Location shooting took place around London. Interiors were shot at Shepperton Studios and the Billancourt Studios in Paris. The film's sets were designed by the art director Jean Mandaroux.

== Critical reception ==
The Monthly Film Bulletin wrote: "Shot partly in England and mainly in English (with Dhéry miming mutely), this is a farce rich in characteristically zany Dhéry situations, none of which, unfortunately, comes off. All that emerges is a hectic bustle which remains obstinately unfunny."
