= The Holes =

- Directed by: Pierre Tchernia
- Written by: Pierre Tchernia; René Goscinny
- Starring: Michel Serrault; Philippe Noiret; Charles Denner; Michel Galabru
- Cinematography: Jean Tournier
- Edited by: Françoise Javet
- Music by: Gérard Calvi
- Distributed by: Albina Productions
- Release date: 6 February 1974
- Running time: 94 minutes
- Country: France
- Language: French

The Holes (French: Les gaspards) is a 1974 French comedy film written and directed by Pierre Tchernia.

== Cast ==
- Michel Serrault : Jean-Paul Rondin
- Philippe Noiret : Gaspard de Montfermeil
- Michel Galabru : Commissaire Lalatte
- Charles Denner : The minister
- Prudence Harrington : Miss Pamela Pendleton-Pumkin
- Gérard Depardieu : The postman
- Chantal Goya : Marie-Hélène Rondin
- Roger Carel : Alberto Sopranelli
- Hubert Deschamps : Lestinguois
- Jean Carmet : Paul Bourru
- Annie Cordy : Ginette Lalatte
- Jacques Legras : Bougras
- Robert Rollis : Marcel Merlin
- Raymond Meunier : Mathieu
- Gérard Hernandez : Hervé Balzac

== Awards ==
- Saturn Award for Best Fantasy Film (1977)
