= The Misfit (TV series) =

British TV sitcom (1970–1971)

- Written by: Roy Clarke
- Directed by: James Gatward; Dennis Vance
- Starring: Ronald Fraser; Patrick Newell; Simon Ward; Susan Carpenter
- Country of origin: United Kingdom
- Original language: English
- No. of series: 2
- No. of episodes: 13

Production
- Producer: Dennis Vance
- Running time: 30 minutes
- Production company: ATV

Original release
- Network: ITV
- Release: 3 March 1970 – 12 April 1971

The Misfit is an ATV sitcom series starring Ronald Fraser, Patrick Newell and Simon Ward. It was written by Roy Clarke and was broadcast from 1970 to 1971 on ITV.

== Premise ==
Basil Allenby-Johnson ("Badger" for short) returns from a colonial life in Malaya to an England he no longer recognises.

== Cast ==
- Ronald Fraser as Basil "Badger" Allenby-Johnson
- Patrick Newell as Stanley (his brother)
- Simon Ward as Ted (his son)
- Susan Carpenter as Alicia (his daughter-in-law)

== Background ==
Ronald Fraser said of his character, Badger, that: "He epitomises all that was great about the Edwardian gentleman. Honest as the day is long. Loyal, faithful, loving people whatever their colour or creed, and loved by them. And unable to understand the Permissive Society. I'm absolutely in sympathy with him, except that I'm not quite so square."

The character of Badger originated a couple of years earlier in an episode of the BBC drama The Troubleshooters, also written by Clarke.

Each episode of The Misfit explored Badger's response to a different aspect of modern life in a Britain which had just emerged from the Swinging Sixties. Due to the standard practise of wiping at the time which resulted in the loss of many TV programs, the master tapes of ten episodes from this series were wiped and only survive as 16mm monochrome telerecordings. Only the episodes "On Being British", "On Superior Persons" and "Of Europe and Foreigners and Things" survive on colour videotape.

== Episodes ==
=== Series 1 (1970) ===
No. overall	No. in series	Title	Original release date
1	1	"On Being British"	3 March 1970
2	2	"On the Place of Women in the Home"	10 March 1970
3	3	"On Management and Labour"	17 March 1970
4	4	"On Reading the Small Print"	24 March 1970
5	5	"On Protest"	31 March 1970
6	6	"On Not Being Lost"	7 April 1970

=== Series 2 (1971) ===
No. overall	No. in series	Title	Original release date
7	1	"On the Army Stores Vision of Paradise"	1 March 1971
8	2	"On Paperback Revolutionaries"	8 March 1971
9	3	"On National Health"	15 March 1971
10	4	"On Superior Persons"	22 March 1971
11	5	"On the New Establishment"	29 March 1971
12	6	"On Europe and Foreigners and Things"	5 April 1971
13	6	"On Arrivals and Departures and Things in Between"	12 April 1971

== Reception ==
The 1970 Writers Guild Award for the best writer of a British TV series went to Roy Clarke for this series. Nostalgia Central noted that, although the series "started well", the quality of the scripts "deteriorated, the situations became exhausted, and Fraser's persona was reduced to an irritating whiner".
