= Henri Génès =

French singer and actor

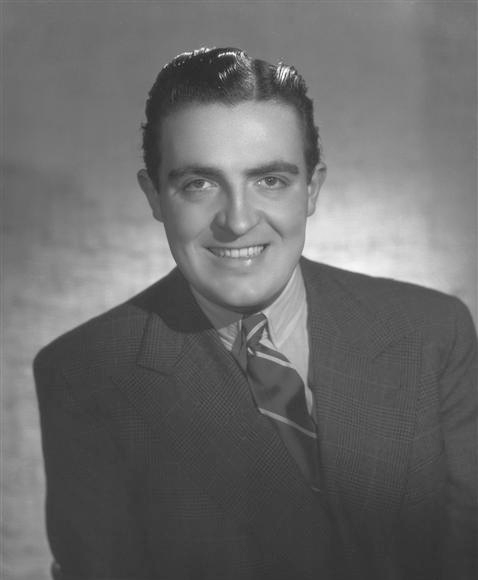
- Born: 2 July 1919; Tarbes, France
- Died: 22 August 2005 (aged 86); Saint-Cloud, France
- Occupation: Actor
- Years active: 1953–1980

Henri Génès (2 July 1919 – 22 August 2005) was a French singer and actor who appeared in such films as The Sucker, La Grande Vadrouille, The Brain, The Counterfeit Constable, and The Little Bather. He was born in Tarbes, and died, aged 86, in Saint-Cloud.

== Partial filmography ==
- Hanged Man's Farm (1945) – Jérôme
- Plume la poule (1947)
- The Chocolate Girl (1949) – Félicien Bédarride
- We Will All Go to Paris (1950) – Julien
- Pigalle-Saint-Germain-des-Prés (1950) – Gustave dit Tatave
- The Lovers of Bras-Mort (1951) – Nestor
- Paris Is Always Paris (1951) – Paul Gremier
- Nous irons à Monte Carlo (1951) – Antoine Lacassagne
- A Hundred Francs a Second (1953) – Fernand
- Une fille dans le soleil (1953) – Virgile
- Au diable la vertu (1953) – Pierre Montabrel
- Jeunes mariés (1953) – Le garagiste
- Les détectives du dimanche (1953) – Molot
- L'Œil en coulisses (1953) – Tonin Bonafous
- Women of Paris (1953) – Lucien Mosca, le patron du Ruban Bleu
- Soirs de Paris (1954) – Tino Carivari
- Queen Margot (1954) – Annibal de Coconas
- La rue des bouches peintes (1955) – Philippe Jacquemod
- Trois de la Canebière (1956) – Girelle
- Ces sacrées vacances (1956) – Le brigadier de gendarmerie
- Coup dur chez les mous (1956) – Ernest Mamourette
- Three Sailors (1957) – Honoré
- The Counterfeit Constable (1964) – Gros Max
- The Sucker (1965) – Martial
- La Grande Vadrouille (1966) – L'employé du zoo
- Le Petit Baigneur (1968) – Le paysan
- The Brain (1969) – Le gardien-chef de la prison de Poissy
- Les gros malins (1969) – Docteur Vergeze
- L'homme qui vient de la nuit (1971) – André
- Le rallye des joyeuses (1974) – Le paysan
- Young Casanova (1974) – Maxime Lavaux
- En grandes pompes (1974) – Henri
- Animal (1977) – Camille, le patron du bistrot
- Ça va pas la tête (1978) – L'oncle
- Embraye bidasse... ça fume (1978) – Le capitaine
- The Gendarme and the Extra-Terrestrials (1979) – Le patron du restaurant 'Le Cabanon'
- L'avare (1980) – Le commissaire
- Sacrés gendarmes (1980) – Le curé
- Touch' pas à mon biniou (1980) – Riton
- Prends ta rolls et va pointer (1981) – Le douanier à l'accent
- La Soupe aux choux (1981) – le brigadier chef
- Mon Curé Chez les Nudistes (1982) – Truffard
- Le Braconnier de Dieu (1983) – Le patron du 'Café de la paix'
- Vive la sociale! (1983) – Monsieur Armand
- Waiter! (1983) – Sangali
- Y'a pas le feu... (1985) – Le maire
- Le facteur de Saint-Tropez (1985) – L'adjudant Antonin Ficelle
- La fille des collines (1990) – Le maire
- Le provincial (1990) – L'abbé
- L'écrou (1991)
- Justinien Trouvé, ou le bâtard de Dieu (1993) – Grand Vigilant (final film role)
