= La Gueule de l'autre =

- Directed by: Pierre Tchernia
- Written by: Jean Poiret
- Produced by: Jean Poiret
- Starring: Michel Serrault; Andréa Parisy; Jean Poiret; Curd Jürgens; Bernadette Lafont
- Cinematography: René Mathelin
- Edited by: Françoise Javet; Nicole Gauduchon
- Music by: Claude Bolling
- Distributed by: AMLF
- Release date: 12 December 1979
- Running time: 100 minutes
- Country: France
- Language: French

La Gueule de l'autre is a French comedy film with a satirical look at political values.

== Synopsis ==
The film starts in 1978 Paris. In the middle of the presidential election, Martial Perrin, president of the "parti centriste des Conservateurs Indépendants Progressistes" (CIP), learns that Richard Krauss, an old mercenary convicted for taking violent action against the Djibouti government when the latter was still a French colony, has escaped from prison. In his trial, he had publicly promised to kill every man who had stood in the way of his Coup d'état. Martial Perrin is one of those men.

Hours after Krauss' escape, the first murders in his old entourage are announced. Martial Perrin is now so terrified that he acts like a tracked animal: staying away from the windows and sources of light, exiting his home only by back doors, not even wanting to make public speeches. His behavior quickly becomes a standing joke among his fellow politicians and rivals. Therefore, Jean-Louis Constant, his councilor, advises him to be replaced by his cousin and look-alike, Gilbert Brossard, until the Krauss is caught and imprisoned. The latter finds out that not only is his task amusing, but it is also the perfect way to fool the police, population, politicians and even his cousin's wife in bed! A face-to-face meeting is organised with a spokesman of a rival political party, in which Brossard will have to use every last bit of his talent to imitate the great Perrin...whilst being as pathetic as the real one. Will the killer be fooled by this subterfuge? That is the question.

== Actors and Characters ==
- Michel Serrault : Martial Perrin / Gilbert Brossard
- Andréa Parisy : Marie-Hélène Perri
- Jean Poiret : Jean-Louis Constant
- Bernadette Lafont : Gisèle Brossard
- Curd Jürgens : Wilfrid
- Roger Carel : Roland Favereau
- Georges Géret : The inspector Javert
- Catherine Lachens : Florence
- Francis Lax : The inspector Statino
- Jacques Legras : Hervé Bidart
- Clément Michu : Boireau
- Hans Meyer : Richard Krauss
- Bernard Lavalette : Monsieur le Comte de Chalosse
- Marco Perrin : Raoul Garrivier
- François Lalande : Michel Bertheau
- Jacqueline Jehanneuf : Emma Sardieu
- Paulette Dubost : Mrs. Chalebouis
- Robert Destain : Marcel Berthomier
- Maurice Travail : Jean-Luc Ferrari
- Rose Thiéry : Thérèse
- Michel Blanc : Taboureau
- Odile Mallet : Madame de la Tournerie
- Dominique Lavanant : The abused woman in the hotel room
- Pierre Douglas : The Host of "Face à face"
- Dorothée : The announcer
- Lily Fayol : Gisèle Brossard's mother
- Jacques Deschamps : The TV director's Voice
- Germaine Delbat : Madame Perrin
- Robert Rollis : The sound engineer
- Pierre Tchernia : Narrator
- Albert Augier : The principal Inspector
- Marcelle Ranson-Hervé : The Minister
- Colette Brosset : The tango student
- Patrick Poivre d'Arvor : Himself
- Stéphane Paoli : Himself
- Gabriel Cattand
- Michel Fortin
- Jerry Di Giacomo
- Peter Semler
- Jean Ory
- Claude Legros
- Gérard Loussine
