= Branquignol =

1949 film

- Directed by: Robert Dhéry
- Written by: Robert Dhéry
- Produced by: Jacques Bar; Henri Diamant-Berger
- Starring: Colette Brosset; Julien Carette; Annette Poivre
- Cinematography: Jean Bourgoin
- Edited by: Christian Gaudin
- Music by: Gérard Calvi
- Production companies: Cité-Films; Fidès
- Distributed by: Les Films Fernand Rivers
- Release date: 16 December 1949
- Running time: 97 minutes
- Country: France
- Language: French

Branquignol is a 1949 French comedy film directed by Robert Dhéry and starring Colette Brosset, Julien Carette and Annette Poivre. It takes its name from a comedy troupe of the same name. It was shot at the Epinay Studios in Paris. The film's sets were designed by the art director Roger Briaucourt.

== Synopsis ==
The Marquis de Pressaille plans to announce his engagement during a gala show. However in support of one of their friends who is in love with his intended bride, the Branquignol sets out to sabotage the announcement.

== Cast ==
- Colette Brosset as Caroline
- Julien Carette as Lui-même en majordome - puis en machiniste de théâtre minable
- Annette Poivre as La spectatrice aux pommes de terre
- Raymond Bussières as Le plombier
- Marcel Vallée as Le préfet
- Madeleine Lambert as La marquise de Pressailles
- Raymond Souplex as Le convive de sang-froid
- Mathilde Casadesus as Suzanne
- Pierre Destailles as Pierrot
- Michèle Lahaye as La colonelle
- Albert Duvaleix as Le scrogneugneu
- Pierrette Rossi as Pierrette
- Robert Rocca as Le protestataire
- Rose Mania as La femme jalouse
- Henri Leca as Le mari de la femme jalouse
- Jean Carmet as Bidel - un fantaisiste raté
- Jacques Emmanuel as Le marquis Hercule de Pressailles
- Micheline Dax as Aurélie de la Molette
- Roger Saget as Le majordome
- Paulette Arnoux as La femme du spectateur sourd
- Jacques Legras as Le domestique qui crie trop fort
- René Dupuy as Gabriel
- Jean Pignol as Un cow-boy
- Johnny Sabrou as Le guitariste de l'orchestre
- Titys as Le spectateur sourd
- Denise Provence as Une danseuse
- Al Cabrol as Un cow-boy
- Loulou Ferrari as La partenaire de l'Hercule
- Charles Montel as Un vieil homme
- Pauline Carton as L'astiqueuse de cloches
- André Gabriello as Le spectateur qui a trop chaud
- Robert Dhéry as Bill Rockett - un cow-boy d'opérette
- Christian Duvaleix as Un branquignol
- Rosine Luguet as Elle-même en funambule
- Robert Destain as Le chanteur
- Henri Ferrari as Lui-même en Hercule de foire
- Gérard Calvi as Le chef d'orchestre
- Capucine as Une cow-girl
- Christiane Minazzoli as La danseuse au ballon

== Bibliography ==
- Oscherwitz, Dayna & Higgins, MaryEllen. The A to Z of French Cinema. Scarecrow Press, 2009.
