= Jean Tournier =

French cinematographer (1926–2004)

- Born: 3 April 1926; Toulon, France
- Died: 9 December 2004 (aged 78); Paris, France
- Occupation: Cinematographer
- Years active: 1956–1994

Jean Tournier (3 April 1926 – 9 December 2004) was a French cinematographer.

He was born in Toulon, France. He is best known for The Day of the Jackal and Moonraker.

== Filmography ==
- Quai du Point-du-Jour (1960)
- No Burials on Sunday (1960)
- L'Homme à femmes (1960)
- Amélie ou le temps d'aimer (1961)
- Les bras de la nuit (1961)
- Les Mystères de Paris (1962)
- The Train (1964)
- Allez France! (1964)
- Faites vos jeux, mesdames (1965)
- Les Deux Orphelines (1965)
- Compartiment tueurs (1965)
- La bourse et la vie (1966)
- Roger la Honte (1966)
- Le voyage du père (1966)
- Un homme de trop (1967)
- Le Grand Bidule (1967)
- L'Homme à la Buick (1968)
- Le Petit Baigneur (1968)
- L'Ardoise (1970)
- Start the Revolution Without Me (1970)
- Comptes à rebours (1971)
- La Cavale (1971)
- Le Viager (1972)
- Trois milliards sans ascenseur (1972)
- The Day of the Jackal (1973)
- Les gaspards (1974)
- Les guichets du Louvre (1974)
- Les Misérables (1978) TV Movie
- Moonraker (1979)
- The Fiendish Plot of Dr. Fu Manchu (1980)
- Trois hommes à abattre (1980)
- Pour la peau d'un flic (1981)
- Le Battant (1983)
- Femmes de personne (1984)
- Mistral's Daughter (1984) TV Mini-Series
- Camille (1984) TV Movie
- Target (1985)
- Sins (1986) TV Mini-Series
- Monte Carlo (1986) TV Mini-Series
- Napoleon and Josephine: A Love Story (1987) TV Mini-Series
- Bonjour l'angoisse (1988)
- Les Mannequins d'osier (1989)
- Les 1001 Nuits (1990)
- La Neige et le Feu (1991)
- Cache cash (1994)
