= Love Is Not a Sin =

1952 film by Claude Cariven

- Directed by: Claude Cariven
- Written by: Claude Cariven
- Produced by: Maggie Gillet; Pierre Gillet
- Starring: Robert Dhéry; Colette Brosset; Louis de Funès
- Cinematography: Jacques Robin
- Edited by: Etiennette Muse
- Music by: Marcel Stern
- Production companies: Jeannic Films; Sud Films
- Distributed by: Jeannic Films
- Release date: 27 June 1952
- Running time: 76 minutes
- Country: France
- Language: French

Love Is Not a Sin (French: L'amour n'est pas un pêché) is a 1952 French comedy film directed by Claude Cariven and starring Robert Dhéry, Colette Brosset and Louis de Funès. It was shot at the Billancourt Studios in Paris. The film's sets were designed by the art director Raymond Gabutti.

== Synopsis ==
A leader of an anti-female organisation and a feminist live next door and quarrel violently. Eventually they will end up reconciling.

== Cast ==
- Robert Dhéry as Jacques Loursier, president of the l'U.R.A.F
- Colette Brosset as Eliane Cahuzac, chairwoman of the l'A.P.T.I.D.L.F
- Maryse Martin as the concierge of the building
- Paul Demange as a tenant
- André Chanu as the commander Durmel
- Jacques Legras as Mr Vaugerel, member of the association
- Roger Saget as a mover
- Pierre Duncan as a mover
- Guy Henry as a mover
- Gérard Darrieu as a mover
- Jacky Blanchot as a mover
- Verlor et Davril as the singers of the restaurant
- Mario David as the agent in the staircase
- Louis de Funès as Mr Cottin, member of the U.R.A.F

== Bibliography ==
- Dicale, Bertrand. Louis de Funès, grimaces et gloire. Grasset, 2009.
