= Robert Destain =

French film and television actor

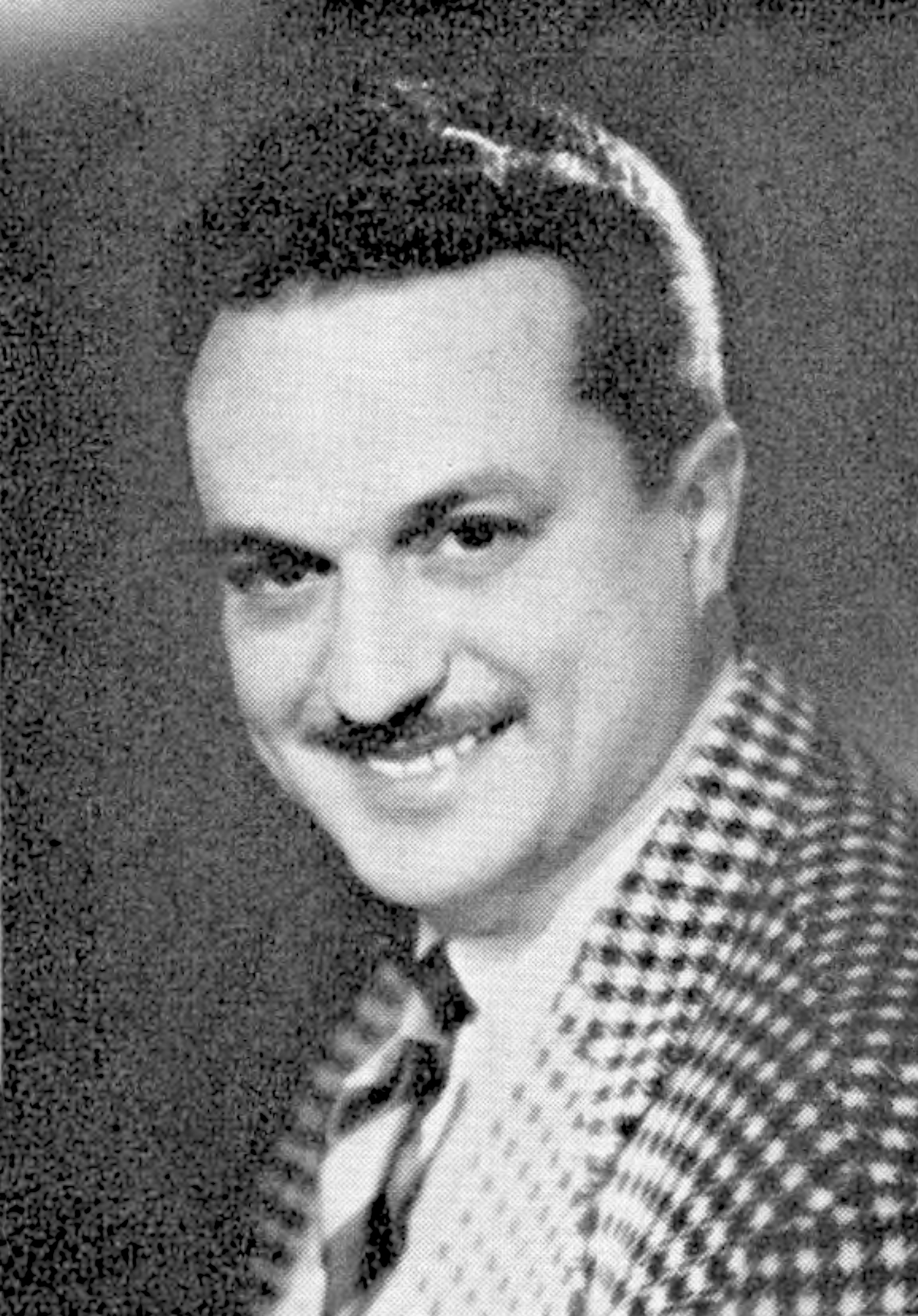
- Destain in 1965
- Born: Pierre Robert Madoule; 1 October 1919; Paris, France
- Died: December 20, 2010 (aged 91); Paris, France
- Occupations: Film and television actor

Pierre Robert Madoule (1 October 1919 – 20 December 2010) was a French film and television actor.

== Life and career ==
Destain was born in Paris. He worked as a baritone, and appeared in numerous operattas. He began his screen career in 1949, appearing in the film Branquignol. In 1950, he appeared in the film We Will All Go to Paris. During his screen career, in 1955, he appeared in the operetta The Strolling Players.

Later in his career, Destain guest-starred in television programs including En votre âme et conscience, Airs de France and La clé des champs. He also appeared in numerous films such as Madelon, Mon pote le gitan, The Lord's Vineyard, His Father's Portrait, Death on the Run, The Counterfeit Constable, La Zizanie, The Terror with Women, Bernard and the Lion, Les Tortillards, Hibernatus, The Big Restaurant and Les Grandes Vacances.

Destain retired from acting in 1979, last appearing in the film La Gueule de l'autre.

== Death ==
Destain died on 20 December 2010, in Paris, at the age of 91.
