= Rendezvous (1961 film) =

1961 film

- Directed by: Jean Delannoy
- Written by: Jean Delannoy; Pierre Bost; Jean Aurenche
- Based on: The Man With Two Wives by Hugh Wheeler
- Produced by: Robert Dorfmann; Robert Gascuel
- Starring: Annie Girardot; Andréa Parisy; Odile Versois
- Cinematography: Robert Juillard
- Edited by: Henri Taverna
- Music by: Paul Misraki
- Production companies: Cinétel; Incei Film; Silver Films
- Distributed by: Cinédis
- Release date: 4 October 1961
- Running time: 128 minutes
- Countries: France; Italian
- Language: French

Rendezvous (French: Le rendez-vous) is a 1961 French-Italian mystery crime film directed by Jean Delannoy and starring Annie Girardot, Andréa Parisy and Odile Versois. George Sanders appears in a small but significant role. It is based on the 1955 novel The Man With Two Wives by British-born writer Hugh Wheeler published under the pen name Patrick Quentin. It was shot at the Billancourt Studios in Paris. The film's sets were designed by the art director Lucien Aguettand.

== Synopsis ==
After a photographer is murdered Pierre attempts to help his ex-wife out by providing her an false alibi. But the killing appears to have more to do more with the dead man's blackmailing a member of the family of the wealthy John Kellerman, who happens to be Pierre's father-in-law.

== Cast ==
- Annie Girardot as Madeleine
- Andréa Parisy as Daphné
- Odile Versois as Edith
- Jean-Claude Pascal as Pierre
- Philippe Noiret as Inspecteur Maillard
- Michel Piccoli as Paul
- Jean-François Poron as Daniel
- Marie-Claude Breton as Catherine
- Robert Dalban as Le patron du bistrot
- Elsa Moltzer as Ellen
- George Sanders as J.K./Kellermann

== Bibliography ==
- Bessy, Maurice & Chirat, Raymond. Histoire du cinéma français: 1956–1960. Pygmalion, 1986.
- Leahy, Sarah & Vanderschelden, Isabelle. Screenwriters in French cinema. Manchester University Press, 2021.
