= Andréa Parisy =

French film actress (1935–2014)

Andrée Parisy
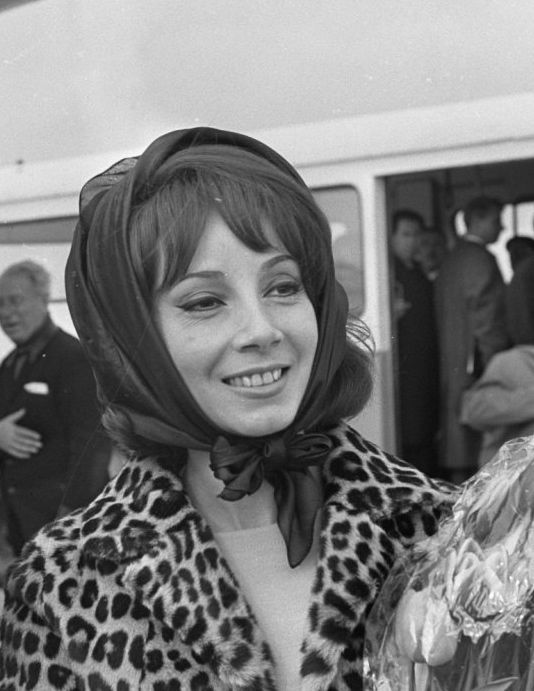
- Parisy in Amsterdam, 1967
- Born: Andrée Marcelle Henriette Parisy; 4 December 1935; Levallois-Perret, Paris, France
- Died: 27 April 2014 (aged 78)
- Other name: Andrée Parizy
- Occupation: Film actress

Andréa Parisy (sometimes credited as Andrée Parizy; 4 December 1935 – 27 April 2014), was a French film actress.

Born Andrée Marcelle Henriette Parisy in Levallois-Perret, she was best known for her roles in films such as Le Petit Baigneur and Bébés à gogo; she also appeared in the 1968 film Mayerling, in which she played Princess Stéphanie of Belgium.

== Death ==
She died on 27 April 2014, aged 78, from undisclosed causes.

== Selected filmography ==
- Les Compagnes de la nuit (1953) – Amie de Ginette (uncredited)
- The Slave (1953)
- Boum sur Paris (1953)
- Service Entrance (1954) – La seconde fille Grimaldi
- School for Love (1955) – (uncredited)
- Babes a GoGo (1956) – Pat – la fille d'Isabelle et Stéphane
- Paris, Palace Hotel (1956) – Une manucure (uncredited)
- Young Sinners (1958) – Clo
- The Restless and the Damned (1959) – Dominique Rancourt
- 125 Rue Montmartre (1959) – Catherine Barrachet
- Stefanie in Rio (1960) – Isabella Sampaio
- Rendezvous (1961) – Daphné
- Girl on the Road (1962) – Une autostoppeuse
- Portrait-robot (1962) – Clotilde
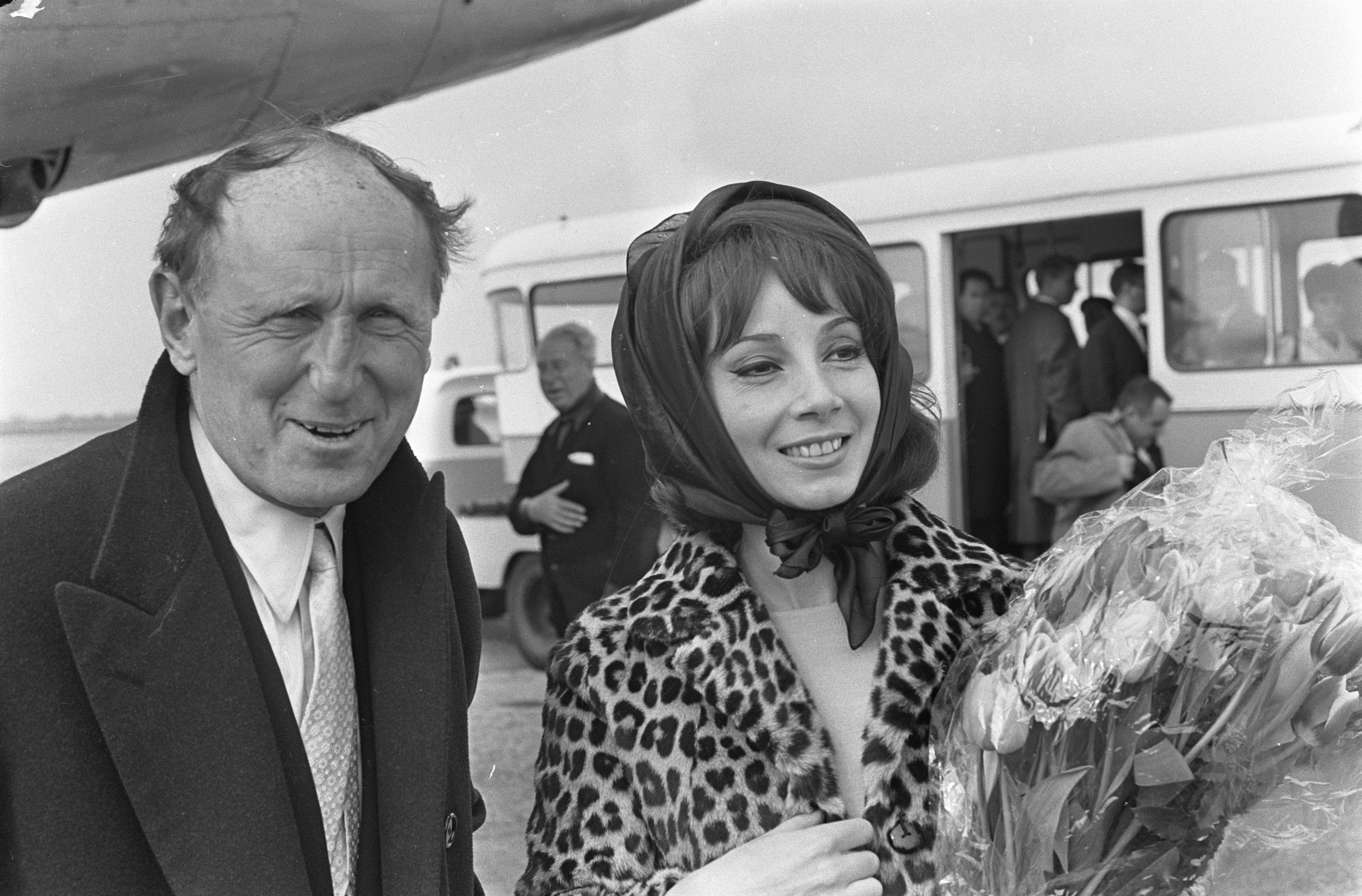
- Andréa Parisy with Bourvil
  Sweet and Sour (1963) – Une éplucheuse
- Greed in the Sun (1964) – Pepa
- How to Keep the Red Lamp Burning (1965) – Lucette, Baronne Seychelles du Hautpas (segment "Procès, Le")
- La Grande Vadrouille (1966) – Soeur Marie-Odile / Sister Marie-Odile
- Le Petit Baigneur (1968) – Marie-Béatrice Fourchaume
- Mayerling (1968) – Princess Stephanie
- Slogan (1969) – Françoise
- La Gueule de l'autre (1979) – Marie-Hélène Perrin
- The Favorite (1989) – Mihrişah
- No Scandal (1999) – Mme. Jeancourt
