= Rosine Luguet =

French actress (1921–1981)

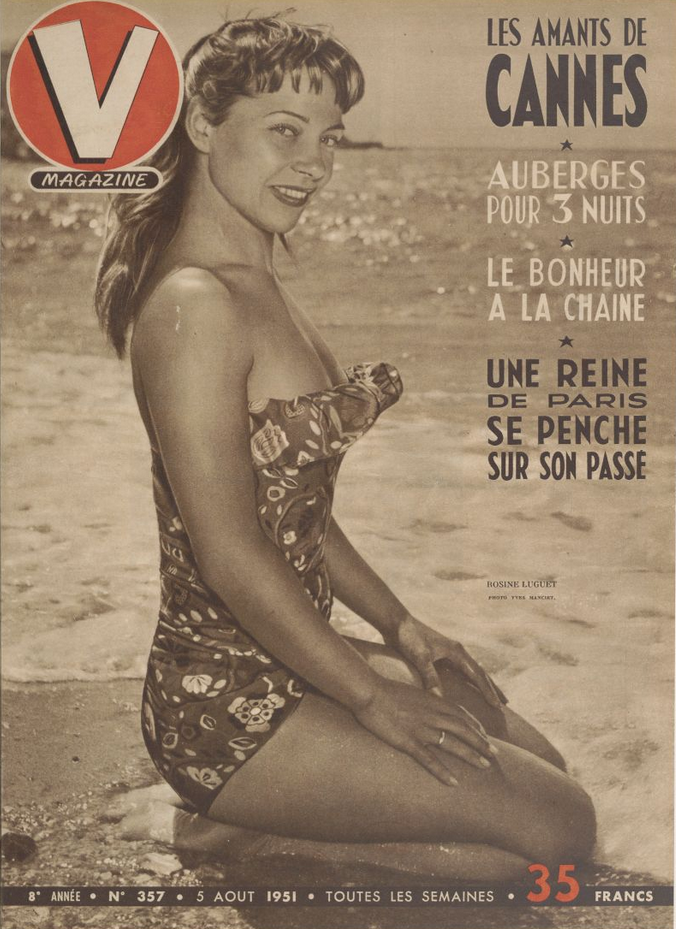
- Rosine Luguet in V of August 5, 1951
- Born: 19 May 1921; Paris, France
- Died: 25 April 1981 (aged 59); Pontoise, Val-d'Oise, France
- Occupation: Actress
- Years active: 1939-1969 (film & TV)

Rosine Luguet (1921–1981) was a French stage and film actress. She was the daughter of the actor André Luguet.

== Selected filmography ==
- Premier rendez-vous (1941)
- The Benefactor (1942)
- Annette and the Blonde Woman (1942)
- Paris Frills (1945)
- Pastoral Symphony (1946)
- Branquignol (1949)
- The Patron (1950)
- The Father of the Girl (1953)
- Ah! Les belles bacchantes (1954)
- Mademoiselle (1966)

== Bibliography ==
- Ann C. Paietta. Saints, Clergy and Other Religious Figures on Film and Television, 1895-2003. McFarland, 2005.
