= Bernard and the Lion =

1951 film

- Directed by: Robert Dhéry
- Written by: Robert Dhéry
- Produced by: Pierre Braunberger
- Starring: Robert Dhéry; Gérard Calvi; Roger Saget
- Cinematography: Henri Decaë
- Edited by: Roger Cacheux; Claude Durand
- Music by: Gérard Calvi
- Production company: Panthéon Productions
- Distributed by: Panthéon Distribution
- Release date: 4 May 1951
- Running time: 99 minutes
- Country: France
- Language: French

Bernard and the Lion (French: Bertrand coeur de lion) is a 1951 French comedy film directed by Robert Dhéry and starring Dhéry, Gérard Calvi and Roger Saget.

The film's art direction was by Raymond Nègre.

== Cast ==
- Robert Dhéry as Bertrand
- Gérard Calvi as Hans
- Roger Saget as Paulo la Paluche
- Robert Destain as Anselme
- René Dupuy as Le lieutenant
- Jacques Legras as Paul
- Franck Daubray as L'épicier
- Jacques Sommet as Gaston
- Capucine as La baronne
- Frédérique Nadar as La soubrette
- Marthe Serres as La chanteuse
- Hubert Deschamps as François, le domestique du baron
- Henri Pennec
- Jean Sabrou
- Christian Gallo
- Raymond Mary
- François Jacques
- Al Cabrol
- Jean Richard as Le brigadier
- Colette Brosset as Anne
- Julien Carette as Le narrateur (voice)

== Bibliography ==
- Philippe Rège. Encyclopedia of French Film Directors, Volume 1. Scarecrow Press, 2009.
