= The Patron =

1950 film

- Directed by: Robert Dhéry
- Written by: Robert Dhéry; André Luguet
- Produced by: André Halley des Fontaines; Ernest Rupp
- Starring: Annie Ducaux; André Luguet; Jean Carmet
- Cinematography: André Germain; Robert Lefebvre
- Edited by: Christian Gaudin
- Music by: Gérard Calvi
- Production companies: Fidès; Le Film d'Art; Union Générale Cinématographique
- Distributed by: L'Alliance Générale de Distribution Cinématographique
- Release date: 25 August 1950
- Running time: 87 minutes
- Country: France
- Language: French

The Patron (French: La patronne) is a 1950 French comedy film directed by Robert Dhéry and starring Annie Ducaux, André Luguet and Jean Carmet. The film's sets were designed by the art director Roger Briaucourt.

== Synopsis ==
The aviatrix Agnès de Louvigny accidentally crashes her plane into the roof of the villa of the fashion designer Martial Sumonet, causing it to become a tourist attraction to the irritation of its owner.

== Cast ==
- Annie Ducaux as L'aviatrice Agnès de Louvigny
- André Luguet as Le grand couturier Martial Sumonet
- Jean Carmet as Le brigadier
- André Gabriello as Argenteuil
- Lucien Callamand as J.P. Otin
- Gérard Calvi as Le chef d'orchestre
- José Casa as Bauginet
- Pierre Dudan as Le Brésilien
- Jacques Emmanuel as Le directeur du journal
- France Gabriel as Corinne
- Denise Kerny as La première
- Jacques Legras as Un témoin
- Rosine Luguet as La petite amie
- Emma Lyonel as Clémence
- Lita Recio as L'Anglaise
- Pierrette Rossi as Le mannequin
- Roger Saget as Un témoin
- Alain Terrane as Lechâtellier

== Bibliography ==
- Goble, Alan. The Complete Index to Literary Sources in Film. Walter de Gruyter, 1999.
- Rège, Philippe. Encyclopedia of French Film Directors, Volume 1. Scarecrow Press, 2009.
