= The Little Theatre of Jean Renoir =

1970 television film

- Video tape cover
- Written by: Jean Renoir
- Directed by: Jean Renoir
- Starring: Jeanne Moreau; Nino Formicola
- Music by: Joseph Kosma; Jean Wiener
- Countries of origin: West Germany; Italy; France
- Original language: French

Production
- Producer: Pierre Long
- Cinematography: Georges Leclerc
- Editor: Geneviève Winding
- Running time: 100 minutes

Original release
- Release: 15 December 1970

The Little Theatre of Jean Renoir (French: Le Petit Théâtre de Jean Renoir) is a 1970 television film written and directed by Jean Renoir. The last completed work by Renoir, it consists of three short films: The Last Christmas Dinner, The Electric Floor Waxer and A Tribute to Tolerance, and a performance of the song "Quand l'amour meurt".

== Cast ==
Film	Role	Actor	Ref
Le Dernier Réveillon	Le Clochard	Nino Formicola	
Le Dernier Réveillon	La Clocharde	Milly	
Le Dernier Réveillon	Gontran	Roland Bertin	
Le Dernier Réveillon	Le Gérant	André Dumas	
Le Dernier Réveillon	Le Maître d'hôtel	Robert Lombart	
Le Dernier Réveillon	Additional roles	Frédéric Santaya; Gib Grossac; Pierre Gualdi; Annick Berger; Roger Trapp; Max Vialle; Jean-Michel Molé; Paulette Deveson; Tom Clark; Sabine Hermosa; Geneviève Taillade; Elisbeth Braconnier; Daniel Sursain; Lolita Soler, Sébastien Floche; Alain Péron; Gilbert Caron; Paul Bisciglia	
La Cireuse électrique	Émilie	Marguerite Cassan	
La Cireuse électrique	Gustave, The Husband	Pierre Olaf	
La Cireuse électrique	Jules	Jacques Dynam	
La Cireuse électrique	Le Représentant	Jean-Louis Tristan	
La Cireuse électrique	Les Amoureux	Denis Gunzburg, Claude Guillaume	
Quand l'amour meurt	La chanteuse	Jeanne Moreau	
Le Roi d'Yvestot	Duvallier	Fernand Sardou	
Le Roi d'Yvestot	Feraud	Jean Carmet	
Le Roi d'Yvestot	Isabelle	Françoise Arnoul	
Le Roi d'Yvestot	Monsieur Blanc	Andrex	
Le Roi d'Yvestot	Maître July	Roger Prégor	
Le Roi d'Yvestot	César	Edmond Ardisson	
Le Roi d'Yvestot	Paulette	Dominique Labourier	
