= The Art of Love (1965 film) =

1965 film by Norman Jewison

- Theatrical release poster
- Directed by: Norman Jewison
- Screenplay by: Carl Reiner
- Story by: Richard Alan Simmons; William Sackheim
- Produced by: Ross Hunter
- Starring: James Garner; Dick Van Dyke; Elke Sommer; Angie Dickinson; Ethel Merman; Carl Reiner
- Cinematography: Russell Metty
- Edited by: Milton Carruth
- Music by: Cy Coleman
- Production companies: Cherokee Productions; Ross Hunter Productions
- Distributed by: Universal Pictures
- Release date: June 30, 1965
- Running time: 99 minutes
- Country: United States
- Language: English
- Box office: $3,500,000 (US/ Canada rentals)

The Art of Love is a 1965 American technicolor comedy film directed by Norman Jewison and starring James Garner, Dick Van Dyke, Elke Sommer, and Angie Dickinson.

The film involves an American artist in Paris (Van Dyke) who fakes his own death in order to increase the worth of his paintings (new paintings keep "posthumously" hitting the market). His conniving pal (Garner) sells the paintings and withholds the proceeds while the artist toils in a shabby garret.

The picture was written by Carl Reiner (from a story by Richard Alan Simmons and William Sackheim). The supporting cast features Carl Reiner and Ethel Merman.

Jewison noted in his autobiography that the film's flaw was that the script assumes that an artist's death guarantees a huge increase in the sales value of his paintings. That hurt audiences' responses to the movie enormously.

All of the paintings that were used in the movie were the work of international artist Don Cincone.

== Plot ==
An aspiring artist, Paul Sloane, struggles in Paris and wants to return home to America to resume his relationship with his rich fiancée, Laurie. His best friend and roommate, Casey Barnett, tries to talk him out of it. When a beautiful woman, Nikki Donay, suddenly leaps into the river Seine to escape a man's attentions, Paul jumps in to save her. They make it to a barge, but Casey and everyone else is under the mistaken impression that neither survived. Casey gets an idea—a dead artist's paintings could now be very valuable, particularly considering the publicity given Paul's heroic attempt to save the damsel in distress. He begins selling Paul's work, but when the artist himself reappears, very much alive, they hatch a scheme. Paul will pretend to still be dead while continuing to produce paintings for Casey to sell. Matters become further complicated when Laurie comes to Paris. Casey falls in love with her. This infuriates his best friend, resulting in Paul seeking revenge by slipping evidence to the police that Casey actually murdered him to profit from the art. Casey is tried, convicted and sentenced to death, by guillotine. Paul saves Casey at the last second. Casey and Laurie end up together. Paul and Nikki get married.

== Cast ==
- James Garner as Casey Barnett
- Dick Van Dyke as Paul Sloane/Toulouse aka Picasso
- Elke Sommer as Nikki
- Angie Dickinson as Laurie Gibson
- Ethel Merman as Madame Coco La Fontaine
- Carl Reiner as Rodin
- Pierre Olaf as Carnot
- Miiko Taka as Chou Chou
- Roger C. Carmel as Zorgus
- Irving Jacobson as Mr. Fromkis
- Jay Novello as Janitor
- Paul Préboist as Bus Driver
