= Ermenonville Zoo =

Former zoo in Oise, France

- Interactive map of Ermenonville Zoo
- 49.13536389°N 2.69676667°E
- Date opened: 1955
- Date closed: 1991
- Location: Ermenonville, Oise (Hauts-de-France)

The Ermenonville Zoo (also known as the Jean Richard Zoo) was a former zoological park located in the commune of Ermenonville in the Oise department, Hauts-de-France, France. It was founded in the mid-1950s by actor and entrepreneur Jean Richard and remained in operation until its closure in 1991.

== History ==
=== Creation and background ===
Ermenonville Zoo was founded in 1955 by French actor Jean Richard, known for portraying Inspector Maigret on television and for his activities as a circus owner and leisure-park entrepreneur. Its creation took place during a period when zoos and leisure facilities were attracting increasing audiences in France in the aftermath of World War II. Jean Richard acquired the Italian Mill (also known as the Moulin-Neuf) in the Parc Jean-Jacques Rousseau area of Ermenonville to serve as his family residence, and established a zoo covering approximately 6 ha (15 acres) within the park grounds.

The zoo opened to the public in 1955, with an official inauguration in May 1956. It was located near the wooded areas of Ermenonville, which provided a favorable natural setting for both animals and visitors. It was the second private zoo created in France after the war. Jean Richard also founded the nearby amusement park La Mer de Sable, inaugurated in 1963, which made Ermenonville a major leisure destination in the Oise department and the Paris region.

=== Development ===
For several decades, the zoo attracted large numbers of visitors who came to observe exotic and domestic animal species. Its collections included big cats (lions and tigers), elephants, giraffes, bears, and primates, housed in enclosures designed according to the educational and zoological standards of the time. Dolphin and sea-lion shows were also presented to the public. This model was typical of private zoos in the 20th century, combining animal exhibitions, visitor interaction, and entertainment inspired by the circus tradition.

=== Closure ===
The zoo closed permanently in 1991 after more than 35 years of operation. Its closure occurred amid major changes in the zoological sector, including evolving animal-welfare standards, rising operating costs, and shifting public expectations regarding the role of zoos.

== Animals and facilities ==
The zoo’s infrastructure consisted of open-air enclosures, feeding areas, and presentation spaces adapted to the main species housed on site.

== Aftermath ==
Following its closure, the site was gradually abandoned. Some structures were dismantled, while others fell into disrepair. Portions of the former zoo grounds were later integrated into natural and recreational areas surrounding the former park. The memory of the zoo has been preserved through archival documents, amateur films, and local testimonies. The mill building remains standing and is protected as a listed historic structure.
