= Premier rendez-vous =

1941 French film directed by Henri Decoin

- Directed by: Henri Decoin
- Written by: Henri Decoin; Michel Duran (dialogue & adaptation); Richard Busch (German version); Max Kolpé (uncredited)
- Produced by: Alfred Greven (uncredited)
- Cinematography: Robert Lefebvre
- Music by: René Sylviano
- Production company: Continental Films
- Release dates: 14 August 1941 (Paris); 20 August 1942 (Nazi Germany); 20 February 1947 (USA)
- Running time: 105 min 91 min (USA)
- Language: French

Premier rendez-vous (US title: Her First Affair) is a 1941 French comedy film starring Danielle Darrieux. It was directed by Henri Decoin, who co-wrote the screenplay with Michel Duran. During the German occupation, the film was made by Continental Films at Paris Studios Cinéma.

== Plot ==
An orphan girl corresponds with a lonely college professor. In the end, she falls in love with his nephew.

== Cast ==
- Danielle Darrieux : Micheline
- Louis Jourdan : Pierre
- Fernand Ledoux : Nicolas Rougemont
- Jean Tissier : Roland
- Gabrielle Dorziat : La directrice de l'orphelinat
- Sophie Desmarets : Henriette
- Rosine Luguet : Angèle
- Suzanne Dehelly : Christophine
- Jean Parédès : De Vatremont
- Georges Mauloy : Le directeur
- Daniel Gélin : Chauveau-Laplace
- Georges Marchal : De Vaugelas
- Annette Poivre : Une pensionnaire
- Simone Valère : Une pensionnaire
- Jacques Charon : Un collégien
- Jacques Dacqmine : Un collégien
- Marcel Maupi
- Jean Négroni
- Robert Rollis

== The first film dubbed in Persian ==
This is the first movie dubbed in Persian in 1946.
