= The Benefactor (1942 film) =

1942 film

- Directed by: Henri Decoin
- Written by: Pierre Ashelbe; Henri Decoin; Yves Mirande
- Starring: Raimu; Suzy Prim; Pierre Larquey
- Cinematography: Jules Kruger
- Edited by: Jean Feyte
- Music by: Georges Van Parys
- Production company: Regina Film
- Distributed by: Regina Distribution
- Release date: 11 December 1942
- Running time: 88 minutes
- Country: France
- Language: French

The Benefactor (French: Le bienfaiteur) is a 1942 French crime film directed by Henri Decoin and starring Raimu, Suzy Prim and Pierre Larquey. It was shot at the Cité Elgé Studios in Paris. The film's sets were designed by the art director Serge Piménoff.

== Synopsis ==
This film portrays a man who leads a double life. In his home town in the provinces he is a respected citizen, but in Paris he is an underworld gang leader.

== Cast ==
- Raimu as Monsieur Moulinet
- Suzy Prim as Irène Berger
- Pierre Larquey as Noblet
- Lucienne Delyle as La chanteuse
- René Bergeron as Le conservateur des hypothèques
- Yves Deniaud as Vinchon
- Alexandre Rignault as Le patron
- Héléna Manson as Gertrude, la bonne
- André Fouché as Claude de Vitrac
- Pierre Jourdan as Le type du bar
- Louis Salou as Deltouche - le bijoutier
- Marguerite Ducouret as Madame Noblet
- Rosine Luguet as Noémie
- Anne Vandène as Simone
- Made Siamé as Madame Barraton - la patronne du bar
- Georges Jamin as Gras-Double
- Pierre Cueille as Calumel
- Gustave Gallet as Le pharmacien
- François Viguier as Le docteur Pintard
- Jo Dervo
- Marcel Maupi as Jambe d'Azur
- Julien Maffre as Juliard
- Marcel Melrac
- Joffre as Le jardinier
- Jacques Baumer as Le directeur de la P.J.
- Lucien Gallas as Bébert
- Georges Colin as L'inspecteur Picard
- Charles Granval as Le maire
- Dorys Dumont
- Richard Francoeur
- Marcelle Monthil as La monitrice
- Émile Saint-Ober
- Simone Signoret as La sécrétaire du journal

== Bibliography ==
- Hayward, Susan. Simone Signoret: The Star as Cultural Sign. A&C Black, 2004.
