= Maryse Martin =

French singer and actress

- Born: 14 December 1906; Paris, France
- Died: 18 May 1984 (aged 77); Paris, France
- Occupations: Singer, actress
- Years active: 1948–1987 (film & TV)

Maryse Martin (1906–1984) was a French singer, film and television actress.

== Selected filmography ==
- Les Casse-pieds (1948)
- We Will All Go to Paris (1950) – Maman Terrine
- Music in the Head (1951) – La paysanne
- Paris Still Sings (1951) – La concierge
- Love Is Not a Sin (1952) – the concierge of the building
- Three Women (1952) – La mère Boitelle
- The Priest of Saint-Amour (1952)
- Children of Love (1953) – Madeleine
- It's the Paris Life (1954) – Mlle Machu
- Leguignon the Healer (1954) – La cliente
- La Cage aux souris (1954) – Roquet
- Casse-cou, mademoiselle! (1955)
- Sophie and the Crime (1955) – La serveuse aux saucisses
- Les Premiers Outrages (1955) – Germaine – la femme de l'aubergiste
- On déménage le colonel (1955) – Mme Auguste – la fermière
- Maid in Paris (1956) – Germaine
- La Joyeuse Prison (1956) – Charlotte Tuboeuf
- Les Promesses dangereuses (1956)
- Mitsou ou Comment l'esprit vient aux filles (1956) – La concierge
- The Happy Road (1957) – The Mother
- L'amour descend du ciel (1957) – La tante de julien
- Bonjour jeunesse (1957)
- Bonjour Tristesse (1958) – (uncredited)
- L'École des cocottes (1958) – La patronne du 'Lapin du Morvan'
- La P... sentimentale (1958) – Solange – la prostituée au canard
- Minute papillon (1959)
- Le secret du Chevalier d'Éon (1959) – Georgette
- Marie of the Isles (1959) – Petit rôle (uncredited)
- Les Frangines (1960) – La directrice
- Boulevard (1960) – Mme Duriez
- Spotlight on a Murderer (1961) – Marthe
- La Traversée de la Loire (1962)
- Jusqu'à plus soif (1962) – La mère Soulage
- Le Magot de Josefa (1963) – Maryse
- Monsieur (1964) – Jusine
- The Gorillas (1964) – La concierge (uncredited)
- Déclic et des claques (1965)
- Un garçon, une fille. Le dix-septième ciel (1966)
- Your Money or Your Life (1966) – La femme à la valise
- Sale temps pour les mouches (1966)
- Bye bye, Barbara (1969) – Habilleuse
- Le petit matin (1971) – Mélanie
- La coqueluche (1971)
- Le polygame (1974) – Mme La Cloche
- En grandes pompes (1974)
- La Soupe froide (1975) – Veleda
- Rien ne va plus (1979) – Une paysanne

== Bibliography ==
- Janis L. Pallister & Ruth A. Hottell. Francophone Women Film Directors: A Guide. Fairleigh Dickinson Univ Press, 2005.
