= We Will All Go to Paris =

1950 French comedy film

- Directed by: Jean Boyer
- Written by: Jean Boyer; André Hornez; Franz Tanzler; Serge Véber
- Produced by: Jean Darvey; Ray Ventura
- Starring: Ray Ventura; Philippe Lemaire; Françoise Arnoul
- Cinematography: Charles Suin
- Edited by: Fanchette Mazin
- Music by: Paul Misraki
- Production company: Hoche Productions
- Distributed by: Les Films Corona
- Release date: 8 February 1950
- Running time: 93 minutes
- Country: France
- Language: French

We Will All Go to Paris (French: Nous irons à Paris) is a 1950 French comedy film directed by Jean Boyer. The film stars Ray Ventura, Philippe Lemaire and Françoise Arnoul. It was shot at the Saint-Maurice Studios in Paris. The films sets were designed by the art director Raymond Nègre.

== Cast ==
- Ray Ventura as Ray Ventura
- Philippe Lemaire as Jacques Lambert, le crooner
- Françoise Arnoul as Micheline Grosbois
- Christian Duvaleix as Paul Chardon
- Maryse Martin as Maman Terrine
- Max Elloy as Honorin
- Albert Duvaleix sa Le commissaire
- Henri Charrett as Un membre de la maréchaussée
- Robert Destain as Le fiancé
- Marcel Charvey as Le chef de la publicité
- Nicolas Amato as Un membre de la maréchaussée
- Charles Bouillaud as Un membre de la maréchaussée
- Marcel Meral as Himself
- Jean Hébey as Le secrétaire
- Georges Baconnet as Le maire
- Henri Génès as Julien
- Fred Pasquali as M. Grosbois
- Martine Carol as Martine Carol
- Monsieur Champagne as Specialty Act
- Georges Lannes as Le directeur de la radio
- Peters Sisters as Themselves
- George Raft as George Raft
- Henri Salvador as Henri Salvador
- Jacques Vertan
- Max Dejean as Max Dejean
- Simone Gerbier
- Lucien Guervil as Un membre de la maréchaussée
- Jeanne Longuet as Jeanne Longuet
- Paulette Rollin as Micheline Grosbois (singing voice)
- René Sauvaire
- Henri Vilbert as Le brigadier

== Bibliography ==
- A Companion to Contemporary French Cinema. John Wiley & Sons, 2015.
