= Are You Sure? (film) =

1947 film

- Directed by: Jacques Houssin
- Written by: Michel Duran; Jean Féline; André Hornez; Jacques Houssin
- Starring: Robert Dhéry; Martine Carol; Grégoire Aslan
- Cinematography: Willy Faktorovitch; Jean-Marie Maillols
- Edited by: Eddy Souris; Marcel Verwest
- Music by: Paul Misraki
- Production company: Ostende Films
- Distributed by: Les Films Corona
- Release date: 18 June 1947
- Running time: 90 minutes
- Countries: France; Belgium
- Language: French

Are You Sure? (French: En êtes-vous bien sûr?) is a 1947 French-Belgian comedy film directed by Jacques Houssin and starring Robert Dhéry, Martine Carol and Grégoire Aslan. The sets of the film were designed by the art director Jean Douarinou.

== Synopsis ==
A scientist tries out his new invention, a machine for altering people's personalities, on a shy bank clerk. He transform him into a bullying kleptomaniac.

== Main cast ==
- Robert Dhéry as Robert
- Martine Carol as Caroline
- Grégoire Aslan as Coco
- Marcel Josz as Le patron de la banque
- Armand Crabbé as Le chanteur d'opéra
- Colette Brosset as L'employée amoureuse de Coco
- Tramel as Le commissaire

== Bibliography ==
- Rège, Philippe. Encyclopedia of French Film Directors, Volume 1. Scarecrow Press, 2009.
