= Colette Brosset =

French actress, writer and choreographer

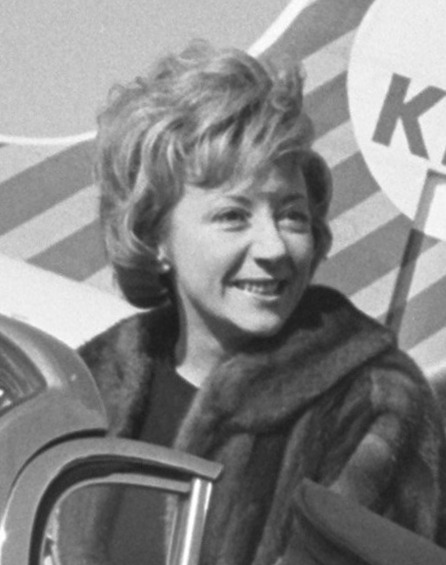
- Colette Brosset in 1962
- Born: Colette Marie Claudette Brosset; 21 February 1922; Paris, France
- Died: 1 March 2007 (aged 85); Paris, France
- Occupations: Actress; comedian; playwright; choreographer
- Spouse: Robert Dhéry (1942–2004)

Colette Marie Claudette Brosset (French: [kɔlɛt bʁɔsɛ]; 21 February 1922 – 1 March 2007) was a French actress, writer and choreographer.

She was married to actor Robert Dhéry, with whom she appeared onstage in La Plume de Ma Tante and Ah! Les belles bacchantes.

She appeared on Broadway in 1959 in La Plume de Ma Tante, and was, along with the rest of the entire cast (Pamela Austin, Roger Caccia, Yvonne Constant, Genevieve Coulombel, Robert Dhéry, Michael Kent, Jean Lefevre, Jacques Legras, Michael Modo, Pierre Olaf, Nicole Parent, Ross Parker, Henri Pennec) awarded a Special Tony Award 1959 for contribution to the theatre.

== Filmography (as actress) ==
- Un coup de rouge (1937)
- Thérèse Martin (1938)
- Star Without Light (1946) – Lulu
- Master Love (1946) – Marie
- Are You Sure? (1947) – l'employée amoureuse de Coco
- Les Aventures des Pieds-Nickelés (1948) – Irène
- I Like Only You (1949) – Monrival
- Branquignol (1949) – Caroline
- Bernard and the Lion (1951) – Anne
- Love Is Not a Sin (1952) – Eliane Cahuzac
- Ah! Les belles bacchantes (1954) – Colette Brosset
- La Belle Américaine (1961) – Paulette Perrignon
- Allez France! (1964) – Lady Yvette Brisburn 'Vévette'
- La Communale (1965) – L'institutrice
- Is Paris Burning? (1966) – (uncredited)
- La Grande Vadrouille (1966) – Germaine
- The Little Bather (1968) – Charlotte Castagnier
- Trois hommes sur un cheval (1969) – Moll / Kiki
- A Time for Loving (1972, TV Movie)
- Vos gueules les mouettes! (1974) – Annick Kenavec
- Jack, or The Submission (1977)
- Qui c'est ce garçon? (1987, TV miniseries) – La grand-mère
- Série noire (1988, TV Series) – Le manteau de Saint Martin (final appearance)
