= Jean Carmet =

French actor (1920–1994)

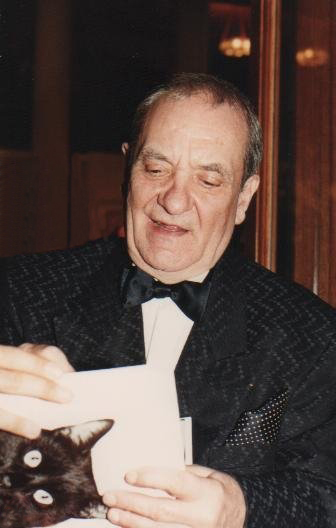
- Jean Carmet in 1993
- Born: 25 April 1920; Tours, Indre-et-Loire, France
- Died: 20 April 1994 (aged 73); Sèvres, Hauts-de-Seine, France
- Occupation: Actor
- Years active: 1941–1994

Jean Carmet (French pronunciation: [ʒɑ̃ kaʁmɛ]; 25 April 1920 – 20 April 1994) was a French actor.

== Life and career ==
Jean Carmet began working on stage and then in film in the early 1940s becoming a very popular comedic actor in his native country. He is best known internationally for his role as a French colonist in the 1976 film, La Victoire en Chantant (Black and White in Color).

Because of his good-natured manner, he was as popular with members of the film crew as he was with the audiences. During his long career, he appeared in more than 200 films, and although he sometimes played dramatic parts, he more often acted in a supporting role as a comedic character.

He was nominated for the César Award for Best Actor for his leading role in the 1986 film, Miss Mona. Twice he won the César Award for Best Actor in a Supporting Role and was nominated on two other occasions. In February 1994, to celebrate his 50th year in film, he was honored by the French motion picture industry with a special César Award. Just a few months later, Jean Carmet died of a heart attack.

Jean Carmet is interred in the Cimetière du Montparnasse in Paris. In his birthplace of Bourgueil, a theater and an avenue were named in his honor.

== Honors ==
- Knight of the Order of Legion of Honour
- Knight of the Order of Agricultural Merit

== Awards ==
- 1995 - 7 d'Or for his role in Eugénie Grandet
- 1994 - Honorary César Award
- 1992 - César Award for Best Actor in a Supporting Role for the film Merci la vie
- 1983 - César Award for Best Actor in a Supporting Role for the film Les Misérables

=== Nominations ===
- 1988 - César Award for Best Actor for the film Miss Mona
- 1987 - César Award for Best Actor in a Supporting Role for the film Les Fugitifs
- 1979 - César Award for Best Actor for the film Le sucre
- 1979 - César Award for Best Actor in a Supporting Role for the film Le sucre

== Selected filmography ==
- The Pavilion Burns (1941)
- The Newspaper Falls at Five O'Clock (1942) - Un typographe (uncredited)
- The Mysteries of Paris (1943) - (uncredited)
- Children of Paradise (1945) - Un spectateur au paradis des Funambules (uncredited)
- François Villon (1945) - Un compagnon de François (uncredited)
- Dawn Devils (1946) - Durand, dit Durandal
- Tombé du ciel (1946)
- Dropped from Heaven (1946) - La troisième complice
- Copie conforme (1947) - Le troisième complice
- Monsieur Vincent (1947) - L'abbé Pontail
- Le diamant de cent sous (1948) - Un invité
- Le destin exécrable de Guillemette Babin (1948) - Étienne
- La bataille du feu (1949) - Albert Farjon
- Bonheur en location (1949) - Guy Piponnet
- I Like Only You (1949) - Le père affolé (uncredited)
- The Wolf (1949) - Gustave
- Dernière heure, édition spéciale (1949) - Nestor
- The Perfume of the Lady in Black (1949) - Le garagiste (uncredited)
- Branquignol (1949) - Bidel - un fantaisiste raté
- Not Any Weekend for Our Love (1950) - Le pianiste malade (uncredited)
- Cartouche, King of Paris (1950) - Brin d'Amour, un soldat
- The Patron (1950) - Le brigadier
- Women Are Crazy (1950) - Emile
- God Needs Men (1950) - Yvon
- The King of Camelots (1951) - La Globule
- Dr. Knock (1951) - Le premier gars
- Les mémoires de la vache Yolande (1951) - Le clerc
- They Were Five (1952) - Jean - le postier
- Les quatre sergents du Fort Carré (1952) - Le Guen
- Monsieur Leguignon, Signalman (1952) - M. Grosjean - policier et habitant du quartier
- La forêt de l'adieu (1952) - Baptiste
- Monsieur Taxi (1952) - François
- Bille de clown (1952) - Gaston Lemeunier
- Drôle de noce (1952) - Paullaud
- She and Me (1952) - Gaston
- Minuit... Quai de Bercy (1953) - Merle, l'adjoint de l'inspecteur
- Quintuplets in the Boarding School (1953) - Antoine
- The Tour of the Grand Dukes (1953) - Le curé du village
- Piédalu député (1954)
- Adam Is Eve (1954) - Gaston
- Le vicomte de Bragelonne (1954) - (uncredited)
- The Duratons (1955) - Gaston Duvet dans l'émission radiophonique
- Ça va barder (1955) - Alvarez
- Madelon (1955) - Le soldat Mathieu
- Bonjour sourire (1956) - Jean Courtebride
- Mon curé champion du régiment (1956) - Le caporal Tiroir
- Trois de la Canebière (1956) - (uncredited)
- Ces sacrées vacances (1956) - Le deuxième inspecteur
- Babes a GoGo (1956) - Hubert
- Les Aventures de Till L'Espiègle (1956) - Lamme
- La ironía del dinero (1957) - Feliciano (segment "Francia")
- Three Sailors (1957) - Papillote
- Mademoiselle et son gang (1957) - Dédé
- The Amorous Corporal (1958) - Balluché
- Oh! Qué mambo (1959) - Jo le Bègue
- Cigarettes, Whiskey and Wild Women (1959) - Martial
- Babette Goes to War (1959) - Antoine (uncredited)
- La Belle Américaine (1961) - Le malandrin / The Burglar
- The Three Musketeers (1961) - Planchet
- The Elusive Corporal (1962) - Guillaume
- The Devil and the Ten Commandments (1962) - Le clochard / Tramp (segment "Bien d'autrui ne prendras")
- Moonlight in Maubeuge (1962) - Le chauffeur
- We Will Go to Deauville (1962) - Le porteur
- Any Number Can Win (1963) - Le barman
- La foire aux cancres (Chronique d'une année scolaire) (1963) - Le chef de gare
- Du grabuge chez les veuves (1964) - L'horloger à l'enterrement
- Les Pas perdus (1964) - Déde Lemartin
- The Counterfeit Constable (1964) - Le porte drapeau
- The Gorillas (1964) - La Fauche
- The Two Orphans (1965) - Picard
- La Métamorphose des cloportes (1965) - Le critique d'art efféminé (uncredited)
- How to Keep the Red Lamp Burning (1965) - Paulo (Le voleur de la lanterne) (segment "Procès, Le")
- Your Money or Your Life (1966) - Le curé
- Roger la Honte (1966) - Tristot
- An Idiot in Paris (1967) - Ernest Grafouillères
- Alexandre le bienheureux (1968) - La Fringale
- Faut pas prendre les enfants du bon Dieu pour des canards sauvages (1968) - Le supertitieux / The superstitious security guard (uncredited)
- L'auvergnat et l'autobus (1969) - L'homme qui veut acheter l'autobus (uncredited)
- Les gros malins (1969) - Le percepteur
- Un merveilleux parfum d'oseille (1969) - Karl de Kerfuntel
- A Golden Widow (1969) - Un membre du Yiddish International Power
- Poussez pas grand-père dans les cactus (1969) - The owner of the café
- Elle boit pas, elle fume pas, elle drague pas, mais... elle cause ! (1969) - Bartender
- And Soon the Darkness (1970) - Renier
- La Rupture (1970) - Henri Pinelli
- The Beginner (1970) - Le client au chien
- The Little Theatre of Jean Renoir (1970, TV Movie) - Le docteur Féraud (segment "Le roi d'Yvetot")
- Le Cri du cormoran le soir au-dessus des jonques (1971) - Gegene
- L'homme qui vient de la nuit (1971) - Angelo
- Just Before Nightfall (1971) - Jeannot
- Le drapeau noir flotte sur la marmite (1971) - Staline
- Le Viager (1972) - Maître Vierzon, l'avocat de Noël
- L'ingénu (1972) - Le pêcheur
- Les malheurs d'Alfred (1972) - Paul
- Les yeux fermés (1972) - Raoul
- Five Leaf Clover (1972) - Lord Picratt
- Elle cause plus, elle flingue (1972) - Jambe de laine
- Le Grand Blond avec une chaussure noire (1972) - Maurice
- La raison du plus fou (1973) - Le mari de la directrice
- Le Concierge (1973) - Ludovic
- Don't Cry with Your Mouth Full (1973) - Louis - le père
- Les grands sentiments font les bons gueuletons (1973) - Georges Armand
- Ursule et Grelu (1974) - Lucien
- Les Gaspards (1974) - Paul Bourru, le marchands de vins
- La gueule de l'emploi (1974) - Le restaurateur
- Comment réussir quand on est con et pleurnichard (1974) - Antoine Robineau
- Un linceul n'a pas de poches (1974) - Comissaire Bude
- Bons baisers... à lundi (1974) - Henri-Pierre - le chef d'un trio de malfaiteurs médiocres
- The Return of the Tall Blond Man (1974) - Maurice Lefebvre
- The Common Man (1975) - Georges Lajoie
- Trop c'est trop (1975)
- Scrambled Eggs (1976) - Marcel Dutilleul
- La Victoire en Chantant (1976) - Le sergent Bosselet
- Alice ou la dernière fugue (1977) - Colas
- Rene the Cane (1977) - L'indicateur
- The More It Goes, the Less It Goes (1977) - Inspecteur Melville
- The Seventh Company Outdoors (1977) - M. Albert, le passeur
- Le beaujolais nouveau est arrivé (1978) - Camadule
- Violette Nozière (1978) - Baptiste Nozière
- Le sucre (1978) - Adrien Courtois
- Un si joli village (1979) - Le Juge Noblet
- Il y a longtemps que je t'aime (1979) - François Dupuis
- Gros-Câlin (1979) - Emile Cousin
- Buffet froid (1979) - L'assassin / The murderer
- The Lady Banker (1980) - Duvernet
- Allons z'enfants (1981) - L'adjudant Chalumot
- L'amour trop fort (1981) - Max
- Circle of Deceit (1981) - Rudnik
- Dead Certain (1981) - Kreps
- La soupe aux choux (1981) - Francis Chérasse (Le Bombé)
- Guy de Maupassant (1982) - François
- Les Misérables (1982) - Thénardier
- Pick Up Your Belongings (1983) - Joseph Cohen
- Papy fait de la résistance (1983) - André Bourdelle
- Dog Day (1984) - Socrate
- Tir à vue (1984) - L'inspecteur Robert Casti
- Sac de noeuds (1985) - M. Buzinski - un pharmacien qui hait les flics
- Night Magic (1985) - Sam
- Le matou (1985) - Egon Ratablavasky
- Mon beau-frère a tué ma soeur (1986) - Jocelyn Bouloire
- Suivez mon regard (1986) - Désiré, le paysan
- Les Fugitifs (1986) - Martin
- Miss Mona (1987) - Miss Mona
- La brute (1987) - M. Deliot
- Le Moine et la sorcière (1987) - Le curé / Vicar
- Les 2 crocodiles (1987) - Emile Rivereau
- L'âge de Monsieur est avancé (1987) - Le régisseur / Désiré
- Mangeclous (1988) - Scipion
- La vouivre (1989) - Réquiem
- Champagne amer (1989) - Zigou
- Périgord noir (1989) - Jean-Lou
- L'invité surprise (1989) - Le colonel
- Un jeu d'enfant (1990) - Le grand-père
- Le sixième doigt (1990) - Le commandant
- My Mother's Castle (1990) - Le garde ivrogne
- Merci la vie (1991) - Raymond Pelleveau (Old Father)
- La reine blanche (1991) - Lucien
- Le bal des casse-pieds (1992) - M. Vandubas
- Coup de jeune (1993) - Ponsard
- Roulez jeunesse! (1993) - Michel
- La chambre 108 (1993) - René Bertillon
- Germinal (1993) - Vincent Maheu dit Bonnemort
- Cache Cash (1994) - Durandet
- Eugénie Grandet (1993, TV Movie) - Monsieur Grandet
