= Service Entrance (1954 film) =

1954 film

Escalier de service
- Directed by: Carlo Rim
- Written by: Carlo Rim; Jean Le Vitte
- Produced by: Alain Poiré; Paul Wagner
- Starring: Etchika Choureau; Danielle Darrieux; Robert Lamoureux
- Cinematography: Robert Juillard
- Edited by: Monique Isnardon; Robert Isnardon
- Music by: Georges Van Parys
- Production companies: Films Paul Wagner; Gaumont
- Distributed by: Gaumont Distribution
- Release date: 16 August 1954
- Running time: 94 minutes
- Country: France
- Language: French

Service Entrance (French: Escalier de service) is a 1954 French comedy drama film directed and written by Carlo Rim and starring Etchika Choureau, Danielle Darrieux and Robert Lamoureux. It was shot at the Billancourt Studios in Paris and at the Louvre Museum. The film's sets were designed by the art director Serge Piménoff.

== Synopsis ==
Walking alone and looking desperate, young Marie-Lou (Etchika Choureau) is taken in hand by Léo, a street photographer and his squatter friends. They all want to know what happened to her, so to satisfy their curiosity, Marie-Lou starts recounting her unfortunate experiences as a housemaid. On account of adverse circumstances, she tells them, she lost all of the jobs she had in five different families. To crown it all, the young man she has fallen in love with, a brilliant artist, is in prison.

== Cast ==
- Etchika Choureau as Marie-Lou
- Danielle Darrieux as Béatrice Berthier
- Robert Lamoureux as François Berthier
- Sophie Desmarets as Madame Dumény
- Jean Richard as Jules Béchard
- Saturnin Fabre as Monsieur Delecluze
- Mischa Auer as Nicolas Pouchkoff
- Alfred Adam as Le cousin Albert
- Junie Astor as Aline Béchard
- Louis de Funès as Cesare Grimaldi, the father, Italian artist
- Marc Cassot as Benvenuto Grimaldi, the son, brilliant painter
- Anne Caprile as Carlotta Grimaldi, the daughter, prostitute
- Andréa Parisy as the second girl Grimaldi
- Marthe Mercadier as Hortense Van de Putte
- Héléna Manson as Madame Delecluze
- Jacques Morel as Georges Dumény
- Yves Robert as Courbessac
- Jean-Marc Thibault as Léopold dit Léo
- Anne Roudier as Madame Grimaldi
- Albert Michel as the sexton, friend of "Grimaldi"
- Fernand Sardou as Scarfatti, the conservative of du Louvre
- Claire Gérard as Victorine, the mechanical street-sweeper of Louvre
- René Hell as a sexton
- Sylvain Levignac as a guest in engagements
- Palmyre Levasseur as a guest in engagements
- Rudy Lenoir as inspector
- René Lefebvre-Bel as a restaurateur of pictures
- Claude Sylvain as Une copine de Léo
- Estella Blain as Une copine de Léo

== Bibliography ==
- Oscherwitz, Dayna & Higgins, MaryEllen . The A to Z of French Cinema. Scarecrow Press, 2009.
