= Ross Parker (songwriter) =

- Ross Parker on the cover of his 1968 album The Happy Piano of Ross Parker

Background information
- Also known as: Ross Parker; Clarke Ross-Parker
- Born: Albert Rostron Parker; 16 August 1914; Manchester, England
- Died: 1 August 1974 (aged 59) Kent, England
- Genres: Pop, swing
- Occupations: Songwriter, lyricist, actor
- Years active: 1930–1974

Ross Parker (born Albert Rostron Parker) (16 August 1914 – 1 August 1974) was an English pianist, composer, lyricist and actor. He is best known for co-writing the songs "We'll Meet Again" and "There'll Always Be an England".

== Songwriting career ==
Parker had a long and successful songwriting career which included chart hits from 1938 to 1970. In 1938 he was already considered one of England's "big five" songwriters. Horace Heidt's version of Parker's song "The Girl In The Blue Bonnet" reached number 15 on the Billboard charts in 1938. "I Won't Tell A Soul (I Love You)" was a number one hit for Andy Kirk and his Twelve Clouds of Joy, spending 12 weeks on the Billboard chart in 1939. Although "There'll Always Be an England" was released before the start of World War II, it became an enormous success when war was declared by Britain.

Parker joined the British Army and was stationed at Roman Way Camp, Colchester Garrison. He found the barracks too noisy and sought solitude for songwriting in a nearby pillbox. This has been narrowed down to one of three structures: SMRs 20546/MCC4968, 20547/MCC4969, 20548/MCC4970.

During the war, he also took on the role of a censor in British India and performed on Radio Ceylon.

He and Hughie Charles (his collaborator on "There'll Always Be an England" and "We'll Meet Again") continued to write patriotic songs such as "The Navy's Here" during the war.

Ross Parker wrote the original songs for several stage shows performed by The Crazy Gang at the Victoria Palace Theatre, London, in the early 1950s, including Knights of Madness, Ring out the Bells, Jokers Wild and These Foolish Kings.

In 1956, Shirley Bassey's manager Michael Sullivan commissioned Parker to write a song for the then 19-year-old Bassey. Parker wrote "Burn My Candle", which later became Bassey's first recording.

Parker wrote the lyrics for "A Song Of Joy", which was a hit for Miguel Rios.

== Acting career ==
Parker made his on-screen debut in the British-American film by Albert R. Broccoli, Chitty Chitty Bang Bang, as Lord Scrumptious's chef. It was his only notable role in a blockbuster film. He appeared as French-Canadian detective sergeant Soustelle in "The Saint" season 2 episode "Judith".

Parker previously had appeared on stage in Paris, in 1955, in Pommes à l'Anglaise. He then performed in the revue La Plume de Ma Tante for several years, firstly at the Garrick Theatre in London from 1956 to 1958, then at the Royale Theatre, New York, from 1958 to 1960, after which the revue toured to Las Vegas, Los Angeles and San Francisco in 1961. Parker returned to the Théâtre des Variétés in Paris in 1965 to appear in this revue once again.

== Death ==
Parker died on August 1, 1974, at the age of 59, at his residence in Kent, England.

== Musicals ==
- Clown Jewels
- Happy as a King
- Knights of Madness
- La Plume de Ma Tante (English lyrics)

== Discography ==
- "The Happy Piano of Ross Parker" (NPL 18262)
