= La Plume de Ma Tante =

- 1960 playbill
- Music: Gerard Calvi
- Lyrics: Ross Parker; Francis Blanche
- Book: Robert Dhéry
- Productions: 1958 Broadway

La Plume de Ma Tante is a 1955 musical comedy, written, devised, and directed by Robert Dhéry, with music by Gérard Calvi, and English lyrics by Ross Parker. The play consisted of a number of short sketches in English, French, and pantomime, satirizing French society.

It first opened in 1955 at the Garrick Theatre, London, and closed after a run of two and a half years. It then transferred to the USA.

On Broadway, it was nominated for the Tony Award for Best Musical, and in three other categories, winning the 1959 Special Tony Award. Pierre Olaf was one of the show's leading actors.

It opened on Broadway at the Royale Theater on November 11, 1958 and closed on December 17, 1960 after a total of 835 performances. Subsequently, the show toured to Las Vegas, Los Angeles and San Francisco during 1961.

== Awards and nominations ==
=== Original Broadway production ===
Year	Award	Category	Nominee	Result
1959	Tony Award	Best Musical		Nominated
1959	Tony Award	Best Direction of a Musical	Robert Dhéry	Nominated
1959	Tony Award	Best Conductor and Musical Director	Gershon Kingsley	Nominated
1959	Special Tony Award	Contribution to the Theatre	The Cast	Won
1959	New York Drama Critics' Circle Awards	Best Musical	Gerard Calvi, Ross Parker, Francis Blanche and Robert Dhéry	Won
