= Robert Dhéry =

French comedian, actor, director and screenwriter

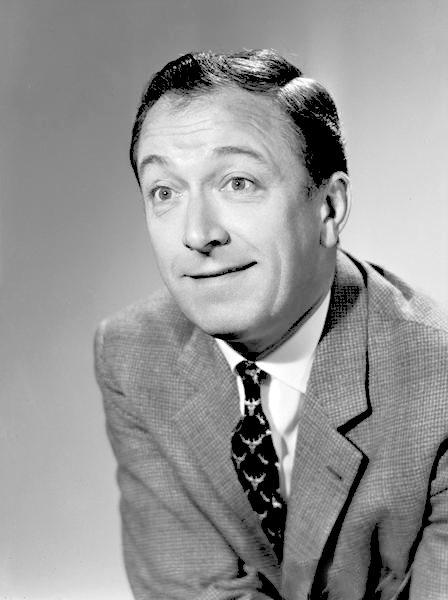
- Dhéry in 1964
- Born: Robert Léon Henri Fourrey; 27 April 1921; Saint-Denis France
- Died: 3 December 2004 (aged 83); Paris, France
- Occupations: Actor; comedian; director; screenwriter; playwright
- Spouse: Colette Brosset (1942–2004)

Robert Dhéry (French pronunciation: [ʁɔbɛʁ deʁi]; 27 April 1921 – 3 December 2004) (born Robert Léon Henri Fourrey or Robert Foullcy) was a French comedian, actor, director and screenwriter.

He was married to actress Colette Brosset, with whom he appeared onstage in La Plume de Ma Tante. Starting in the 1940s, Dhéry assembled a rotating comedy troupe of performers known collectively as "Les Branquignols" (the goofballs) with whom he performed in various plays, and later in several films. Many Branquignol members became major French entertainers, including Louis de Funès, Michel Serrault, Jean Lefebvre, Jean Carmet, Francis Blanche, Jacqueline Maillan and Micheline Dax. Dhéry also frequently collaborated with composer Gérard Calvi, who created music for his shows.

He appeared on Broadway from 1958 to 1960 in La Plume de Ma Tante, and was, along with the rest of the entire cast (Pamela Austin, Colette Brosset, Roger Caccia, Yvonne Constant, Genevieve Coulombel, Michael Kent, Jean Lefevre, Jacques Legras, Michael Modo, Pierre Olaf, Nicole Parent, Ross Parker, Henri Pennec) awarded a Special Tony Award 1959 for contribution to the theatre.

Dhéry also directed several films, including La Belle Américaine (1961) and The Little Bather (1968) that were major box-office hits in France.

== Selected filmography ==
- Night Shift (1944)
- Last Chance Castle (1947)
- One Night at the Tabarin (1947)
- Are You Sure? (1947)
- Branquignol (1949)
- I Like Only You (1949)
- The Patron (1950)
- Bernard and the Lion (1951)
- Love Is Not a Sin (1952)
- La demoiselle et son revenant (1952)
- The Pirates of the Bois de Boulogne (1954)
