= Gérard Calvi =

French composer

- Born: Grégoire Krettly; 26 July 1922; Paris, France
- Died: 20 February 2015 (aged 92); Paris, France
- Education: Conservatoire de Paris
- Occupation: Composer
- Relatives: Yves Calvi (son)

Gérard Calvi (born Grégoire Krettly; 26 July 1922 – 20 February 2015) was a French composer.

Interested in music from an early age, Calvi's first composing work was for the French production The Patron in 1949. From here he provided music for various French films, most notably Gangster Boss, as well as the show La Plume de Ma Tante, which was nominated for Best Musical at the 13th Tony Awards.

He composed music for three Asterix films: Asterix the Gaul, Asterix and Cleopatra and The Twelve Tasks of Asterix.

He also composed the memorable Asterix theme for the first film, which was dispensed with by the time the music for The Twelve Tasks of Asterix was composed in 1976.

His last work was for the feature film The Crab Revolution in 2004. He died in 2015, aged 92.

== Shows ==
- Ah! Les belles bacchantes (1954)
- La Plume de Ma Tante (1958)
- La Grosse Valise (1965)
- Le Saint prend l'affût (1966)

== Selected filmography ==
- Branquignol (1949)
- The Patron (1950)
- Bernard and the Lion (1951)
- The Big Chief (1959)
- Monsieur Robinson Crusoe (1960)
- The Fenouillard Family (1960)
- The American Beauty (1961)
- The Black Tulip (1964)
- Champagne for Savages (1964)
- The Saint Lies in Wait (1966)
