= Henri Betti =

French composer and pianist (1917–2005)

- Born: Ange Eugène Betti; 24 July 1917; Nice, France
- Died: 7 July 2005 (aged 87); Courbevoie, France
- Burial place: Neuilly-sur-Seine community cemetery
- Education: Conservatoire de Paris
- Occupations: Composer; Conducting; Pianist; Singing
- Years active: 1941–1987
- Notable work: C'est si bon (1947); What Can I Do ? (1947); The Windmill Song (1948)
- Website: Henri Betti

Henri Betti, born Ange Betti (24 July 1917 – 7 July 2005), was a French composer and a pianist.

Pianist and composer of Maurice Chevalier from 1940 to 1945, Henri Betti is best known for composing the music of the songs C'est si bon (lyrics by André Hornez), What Can I Do ? (lyrics by Édith Piaf) and The Windmill Song (lyrics by Jacques Plante) that were performed by Yves Montand.

== Biography ==
Henri Betti was born at 1 rue Barillerie in the district of Vieux-Nice in a modest family : his father was a house painter and his mother was a fishmonger. His paternal family originates from the region of Emilia-Romagna in Italy : his grandfather was born in Parma and he immigrated to Nice with his wife and children in 1893.

In 1935, he entered at the Conservatoire de Paris which is then directed by Henri Rabaud where he studied music in the same class as Maurice Baquet, Paul Bonneau, Henri Dutilleux and Louiguy. He is the student of Lazare Lévy for piano class and Raymond Pech for harmony class. He won a prize of harmony in 1937.

He then headed for a classical pianist, but in 1940, when he has been discharged from military service of Fortified Sector of the Dauphiné in Briançon, he crosses the Corsican composer Roger Lucchesi on the Promenade des Anglais, who told him that he composed a song for Maurice Chevalier and asked him to accompany him to the piano when he the present him in his property La Louque in Cannes. Maurice Chevalier refuse the song but to ask Henri Betti be his regular accompanist. During the singing tours, he will make him play the Ballade No. 1 in G minor, Op. 23 by Frédéric Chopin between songs. Anxious to renew his repertoire, he also asked him to compose songs. Henri Betti then wrote music forty songs with the lyrics of Maurice Chevalier and Maurice Vandair until 1945 that Notre Espoir and La Chanson du maçon in 1941 or La Fête à Neu-Neu in 1943. Of the fifteen securities singing tour of Maurice Chevalier in 1945, Henri Betti sign fourteen.

He joined the SACEM in 1941 as composer and was appointed Sociétaire définitif in 1949.

After World War II, he knows great success with Le Régiment des mandolines in 1946 and Le Chapeau à plumes in 1947 for Lily Fayol, Mais qu’est-ce que j’ai ? in 1947, Maître Pierre and Rien dans les mains, rien dans les poches in 1948 for Yves Montand and especially C'est si bon in 1947 for Jean Marco with Jacques Hélian and his Orchestra. The song is sung by Yves Montand before becoming a standard international jazz with Louis Armstrong, who recorded for the first time in New York in 1950 in the English version of Jerry Seelen.

From 1949 to 1983, his music production is abundant : revues for Le Lido, the Moulin Rouge, the Folies Bergère, the Olympia, the Stardust and the Tropicana in Las Vegas, and many operettas and plays.

He has also composed for the cinema in the 1950s and television in the 1960s. His most famous soundtrack is that of Honoré de Marseille which will nearly 4 million admissions in France in 1957. In this movie, Fernandel sings three songs composed by Henri Betti and the words by Jean Manse. Henri Betti and Jean Manse had written a fourth song for the movie, C'est Noël, sung by Fernandel in a scene that was edited out. The song was later sung by Tino Rossi and Georges Guétary. In 1953, he played the role of the composer and accompanist of the company of Jean Nohain in Soyez les bienvenus by Pierre-Louis which he also composed the music for the film.

In the early 1950s, he made her singing on stage first as vedette américaine featuring at the ABC in 1951 and the Theatre des Deux Anes, in parisian cabarets as Le Bosphore and Chez Tonton, and in summer outdoors in Nice, Cannes, Juan-les-Pins shows. And then as a full-featured except to Bobino and Gaumont-Palace. His talent manager was Johnny Stark.

During his career as a musician, Henri Betti worked with the composers Paul Bonneau, Gérard Calvi, Bruno Coquatrix, Jean-Pierre Landreau and Rolf Marbot and with the lyricists André Berthomieu, Bourvil, Jean Boyer, Charlys, Maurice Chevalier, Jean Cosmos, Pierre Cour, Yves Favier, Pierre Gilbert, André Hornez, Jean Le Seyeux, Francis Lopez, Jean Manse, Jacques Mareuil, Jean Nohain, Édith Piaf, Jacques Pills, Jacques Plante, René Rouzaud, André Salvet, Pascal Sevran, Maurice Vandair, Henri Varna, Raymond Vincy and Albert Willemetz.

In 1951, he participated with Albert Willemetz to the foundation of the Comité du Cœur, relief fund for needy artists under the auspices of the SACEM, which will be Vice-President.

In 1958, he collaborated with Jean-Pierre Landreau to compose all the music revues of Lido for the company Lido-Mélodies whose two founding members are Jean Gruyer and Pierre Delvincourt.

In 1959, he collaborated with Bruno Coquatrix to compose the music of Paris mes amours and Avec (lyrics by André Hornez) which were performed by Josephine Baker at the Olympia.

In 1960, he wrote the music for the song Les Étangs de Sologne with the lyrics by Paul Vialar which was sung the same year by Jean Philippe in the TV show Toute la Chanson.

In 1971, he participated with Maurice Lehmann to the foundation of the ANAO (Association Nationale des Amis de l’Opérette) which will be Vice-President.

He was member of Conseil d'administration of the SACD from 1961 to 1975 and of the SACEM in 1982, 1983, from 1985 to 1987 and from 1989 to 1992.

In 1987, he composed the music for his last song with lyrics of Pascal Sevran : C'est à Brasilia, performed by Les Sœurs Étienne.

In 1993, he published his autobiography, C'est si bon !, published by La Pensée Universelle.

In 2003, he entered the nursing home Ger'Home in Courbevoie where he died two years later of natural causes at the age of 87 years.

His funeral held at the Eglise Saint-Pierre de Neuilly-sur-Seine, he is then cremated at the crematorium of Fort Mont-Valérien and buried in the Neuilly-sur-Seine community cemetery (Division 11).

== Personal life ==
Henri Betti married on 30 July 1949 in Bois-Colombes with the dancer Françoise Engels (1929–2023), met on the operetta Baratin that same year. His wedding witnesses were Bruno Coquatrix and André Hornez. The couple had three children and the godfather and godmother of their first child were André Hornez and Paulette Coquatrix.

Henri Betti was the brother of Freda Betti and the great granduncle of Alexy Bosetti.

== Awards ==
Prix Daris with Maurice Chevalier and Maurice Vandair for La Chanson du maçon in 1942. Chevalier of the Ordre des Palmes Académiques in 1960. Prix Maurice-Yvain by the SACD in 1980. Médaille by the SDRM in 1985. Médaille by the SACEM in 1991 and 1994.

== Tribute ==
In 2006, his son François Betti realized the musical engravings and wrote the comments of the songbook Une Vie en Chansons. In this album which is published by Paul Beuscher, there are the musical scores of 12 songs of Henri Betti : Notre espoir (lyrics by Maurice Chevalier), La Chanson du maçon, Chanson Populaire (lyrics by Maurice Chevalier and Maurice Vandair), Le Régiment des mandolines (lyrics by Maurice Vandair), C'est si bon (lyrics by André Hornez), Mais qu’est-ce que j’ai ? (lyrics by Édith Piaf), Rien dans les mains, rien dans les poches (lyrics by André Hornez), Maître Pierre (lyrics by Jacques Plante), Toutes les femmes, Deux amoureux sur un banc, Elle et lui (lyrics by André Hornez) and Comme c'est bon chez toi (lyrics by Pierre Cour).

In 2018, Benoît Duteurtre hosted a radio show, Étonnez-moi Benoît, about Henri Betti's career with the participation of the composer's son and grandson: François and Olivier Betti. In this radio program, which was broadcast on France Musique on 28 April, were 10 songs by Henri Betti: Le Régiment des mandolines (by Lily Fayol), Tout ça c'est Marseille (by Fernandel), Notre espoir (by Maurice Chevalier), Mais qu’est-ce que j’ai ? (by Yves Montand), C'est si bon (by Jean Marco and the Étienne Sisters), Les Baobabs (by Roger Nicolas), Je cherche un cœur (by Jacques Pills), Grenelle (by Suzy Delair), Il fait beau (by Tino Rossi) and La Chanson du maçon (by Maurice Chevalier).

The same year, a square located on rue Saint-Joseph in Nice took his name.

== Works ==
=== Songs by singers ===
- Andrex
  - Il Faut Chanter (lyrics by Albert Bossy)
  - La Pagaïa (lyrics by Jean Boyer)
- Étienne Arnaud
  - La Fête à Neu-Neu (lyrics by Maurice Vandair)
- Rose Avril
  - Le Manzanilla (lyrics by Maurice Vandair)
- Josephine Baker
  - Avec (lyrics by André Hornez)
  - Paris mes Amours (lyrics by André Hornez)
    - Performed in the revue Paris mes Amours
- Luc Barney
  - Rien dans les mains, rien dans les poches (lyrics by André Hornez)
- José Bartel
  - Donnez-moi tout ça (lyrics by André Hornez)
- Ginette Baudin
  - Le Vrai Mambo (lyrics by Maurice Vandair)
  - Les Baobabs (lyrics by André Hornez)
- Armand Bernard
  - Octave (lyrics by Maurice Vandair)
    - Performed in the operetta Mam'zelle Printemps
- Silvana Blasi
  - Prends Garde à Toi (lyrics by André Hornez)
    - Performed in the revue Folies Chéries
- Bourvil
  - En Nourrice (lyrics by Maurice Vandair and Bourvil)
  - Je m'en Veux (lyrics by André Hornez)
- Reda Caire
  - Au Fond de la Vallée... (lyrics by Tony Andal)
- Nila Cara
  - Mais qu’est-ce que j’ai ? (lyrics by Édith Piaf)
- Maurice Chevalier
  - À Barcelone (lyrics by Maurice Chevalier)
  - Ali Ben Baba (lyrics by Maurice Chevalier)
  - Amuse-toi (lyrics by Maurice Chevalier)
  - Arc-en-Ciel (lyrics by Maurice Chevalier)
  - Bonsoir Messieurs Dames ! (lyrics by Maurice Vandair and Maurice Chevalier)
  - C’est comme ça (lyrics by Maurice Chevalier and Raymond Vincy)
    - Performed in the revue Pour toi Paris
  - C’était un Chanteur de Charme (lyrics by Maurice Chevalier and Léon-René Dauven)
    - Performed in the revue Pour toi Paris
  - La Chanson du Maçon (lyrics by Maurice Vandair and Maurice Chevalier)
  - Chanson Populaire (lyrics by Maurice Vandair and Maurice Chevalier)
  - Chapeau de Paille (lyrics by Albert Willemetz and Jean Le Seyeux)
    - Performed in the short film Rendez-vous avec Maurice Chevalier n°1
  - Deux Amoureux sur un Banc (lyrics by André Hornez)
    - Performed in the short film Rendez-vous avec Maurice Chevalier n°4
  - La Fête à Neu-Neu (lyrics by Maurice Vandair and Maurice Chevalier)
  - Je n’ai Besoin que d’un Cœur (lyrics by Maurice Chevalier)
  - La Leçon de Piano (lyrics by Maurice Vandair)
  - Loulou (lyrics by Maurice Chevalier)
    - Performed in the revue Pour toi Paris
  - Madam’ Madame (lyrics by André Hornez)
  - Mandarinade (lyrics by Maurice Chevalier and Pierre Gilbert)
  - Merci mon Amour ! (lyrics by Maurice Chevalier)
  - Môme de Môme (lyrics by Maurice Chevalier)
  - Mon P'tit Moustique (lyrics by André Hornez)
    - Performed in the short film Rendez-vous avec Maurice Chevalier n°2
  - Monotonie (lyrics by Maurice Vandair and Maurice Chevalier)
  - Notre Espoir (lyrics by Maurice Chevalier)
  - On Veut tant s’Aimer (lyrics by Maurice Chevalier)
  - L’Orientale (lyrics by André Hornez)
  - Oui, Oui, Paris (lyrics by André Hornez)
  - Le P’tit Père la Taupe (lyrics by Maurice Chevalier)
  - La Polka des Barbus (lyrics by Maurice Chevalier)
    - Performed in the revue Pour toi Paris
  - Pour toi Paris (lyrics by Maurice Chevalier and Henri Varna)
    - Performed in the revue Pour toi Paris
  - Le Régiment des Jambes Louis XV (lyrics by Maurice Chevalier)
  - Les Rondondons (lyrics by Maurice Vandair and Maurice Chevalier)
  - Toi… Toi… Toi… (lyrics by Maurice Chevalier)
- Les Compagnons de la chanson
  - Elle Chante (lyrics by René Rouzaud)
  - Maître Pierre (lyrics by Jacques Plante)
- Jean-Pierre Darras and Philippe Noiret
  - Consuela (lyrics by Jean Cosmos)
  - Marche Grecque (lyrics by Jean Cosmos)
  - Mon Grand (lyrics by Jean Cosmos)
  - Paris-Paname (lyrics by Jean Cosmos)
- André Dassary
  - La Route qui Chante (lyrics by Raymond Vincy)
    - Performed in the operetta La Route qui Chante
- Suzy Delair
  - Faisons Semblant d’Être Amoureux (lyrics by André Hornez)
  - Grenelle (lyrics by André Hornez)
  - La Mobilette (lyrics by André Hornez)
    - Performed in the operetta Mobilette
  - Le Manzanilla (lyrics by Maurice Vandair)
- Jula De Palma
  - C'est si bon (lyrics by André Hornez)
  - Maître Pierre (lyrics by Jacques Plante)
- Les Djinns
  - C'est si bon (lyrics by André Hornez)
  - Top Tipi Top (lyrics by Raymond Vincy)
- Dominique
  - Comme par Hasard (lyrics by Jacques Dambrois)
- Éliane Dorsay
  - Le Bonheur du Monde (lyrics by Maurice Vandair)
  - Sérénade au Nuage (lyrics by Maurice Vandair)
- Lucille Dumont
  - Maître Pierre (lyrics by Jacques Plante)
  - Le Régiment des mandolines (lyrics by Maurice Vandair)
- Éliane Embrun
  - Au Fond de la Vallée... (lyrics by Tony Andal)
- Les Sœurs Étienne
  - Les Baobabs (lyrics by André Hornez)
  - C’est à Brasilia (lyrics by Pascal Sevran)
  - C'est si bon (lyrics by André Hornez)
  - Ce n’est pas Lui (lyrics by André Hornez)
  - Donnez-moi tout ça (lyrics by André Hornez)
  - Rien dans les mains, rien dans les poches (lyrics by André Hornez)
  - Toutes les Femmes (lyrics by André Hornez and René Rouzaud)
- Paulette Fargue
  - Farandole en Provence (lyrics by Maurice Vandair)
  - Son Amour (lyrics by Maurice Vandair)
    - Performed in the operetta Mam'zelle Printemps
- Lily Fayol
  - Le Régiment des mandolines (lyrics by Maurice Vandair)
  - Une Aiguille dans un Tas de Foin (lyrics by Maurice Vandair)
  - Le Bandonéon (lyrics by Maurice Vandair)
    - Performed in the operetta Mam'zelle Printemps
  - Le Chapeau à Plumes (lyrics by Maurice Vandair)
  - Entre ses Bras (lyrics by André Hornez)
- Fernandel
  - C'est Noël (lyrics by Jean Manse)
  - Oh ! Honoré (lyrics by Jean Manse)
  - Quel Plaisir ! Quel Travail ! (lyrics by Jean Manse)
  - Tout ça c’est Marseille (lyrics by Jean Manse)
    - Performed in the movie Honoré de Marseille
  - Fais-moi Peur ! (lyrics by Yves Favier and Pierre Sarcelle)
  - Vacances (lyrics by Yves Favier)
- Jacqueline François
  - Maître Pierre (lyrics by Jacques Plante)
- Henri Génès
  - L’Oeil en Coulisse (lyrics by André Hornez and André Berthomieu)
  - On n’est pas des Manchots (lyrics by André Hornez and André Berthomieu)
    - Performed in the movie L'Œil en coulisses
  - La Pagaïa (lyrics by Jean Boyer)
    - Performed in the operetta L'École des Femmes Nues
  - Elle et Lui (lyrics by André Hornez)
  - Et puis (lyrics by André Hornez)
  - Le Vrai Mambo (lyrics by André Hornez)
- Édith Georges
  - Comment me Préférez-vous ? (lyrics by Jean Boyer)
    - Performed in the operetta L'École des Femmes Nues
  - Oh ! Zoé (lyrics by André Hornez)
    - Performed in the movie Death on the Run
- Fernand Gignac
  - Maître Pierre (lyrics by Jacques Plante)
- Ginette Giner
  - La Clé de mon Cœur (lyrics by André Hornez)
    - Performed in the operetta Baratin
- Yvette Giraud
  - C'est si bon (lyrics by André Hornez)
  - Deux Amoureux sur un Banc (lyrics by André Hornez)
  - Maître Pierre (lyrics by Jacques Plante)
- Raymond Girerd
  - Mais qu’est-ce que j’ai ? (lyrics by Édith Piaf)
- Lynda Gloria
  - La Plus Belle Fille (lyrics by André Hornez)
    - Performed in the revue Folies Chéries
- Georges Guétary
  - Au Volant d’une Auto (lyrics by André Hornez and René Rouzaud)
  - Toutes les Femmes (lyrics by André Hornez and René Rouzaud)
  - Vive le Camping (lyrics by André Hornez and René Rouzaud)
    - Performed in the movie Une fille sur la route
  - Cherchez la Femme (lyrics by André Hornez)
  - Tout Vient à Point (lyrics by André Hornez)
    - Performed in the movie The Three from the Filling Station
  - Maître Pierre (lyrics by Jacques Plante)
  - C'est Noël (lyrics by Jean Manse)
- Bernard Hilda
  - C'est si bon (lyrics by André Hornez)
  - Maître Pierre (lyrics by Jacques Plante)
- Rudy Hirigoyen
  - L’Auberge Fleurie (lyrics by André Salvet and Francis Lopez)
  - Va ! (lyrics by André Salvet and Pierre Guitton)
    - Performed in the movie L'Auberge en folie
  - Bonjour à Paris (lyrics by Raymond Vincy)
  - Le Marché de Santa Cruz (lyrics by Raymond Vincy)
  - Maria (lyrics by Raymond Vincy)
  - Mia Cara Carina (lyrics by Raymond Vincy)
  - La Porte du Soleil (lyrics by Raymond Vincy)
  - Ragazzinella (lyrics by Raymond Vincy)
  - Sur ma Charrette Sicilienne (lyrics by Raymond Vincy)
    - Performed in the operetta Maria Flora
  - Le Manzanilla (lyrics by Maurice Vandair)
- Christiane Jaquier
  - La Fontaine de Saint Eloi (lyrics by Jean Nohain)
  - La Pluie et le Beau Temps (lyrics by Jean Nohain)
    - Performed in the movie Soyez les bienvenus
- Rina Ketty
  - Bonne Nuit, Chérie (lyrics by Maurice Chevalier)
- Liliane Lanson
  - Choisir un Mari (lyrics by Raymond Vincy)
    - Performed in the operetta Maria Flora
- Roger Lanzac
  - Ollé, Ollé… Tickets, Tickets... in the movie Soyez les bienvenus (lyrics by Jean Nohain)
  - Touchant, Touchant in the movie Soyez les bienvenus (lyrics by Jean Nohain)
    - Performed in the movie Soyez les bienvenus
- Bernard Hilda
  - Maître Pierre (lyrics by Jacques Plante)
- Lilo
  - C’est pas d’ma Faute (lyrics by Raymond Vincy)
  - Maria (lyrics by Raymond Vincy)
  - Toute Seule à Paris (lyrics by Raymond Vincy)
    - Performed in the operetta Maria Flora
- Lucien Lupi
  - Coucher Dessus, Coucher Dessous (lyrics by André Hornez)
  - Faisons Semblant d’Être Amoureux (lyrics by André Hornez)
    - Performed in the operetta Mobilette
- Rose Mania
  - Les Pépées de Papeete (lyrics by André Hornez)
    - Performed in the operetta Maria Flora
- Jean Marco
  - C'est si bon (lyrics by André Hornez)
  - Le Chapeau à Plumes (lyrics by Maurice Vandair)
  - Le Charbon de la Ruhr (lyrics by Maurice Vandair)
  - Maître Pierre (lyrics by Jacques Plante)
- Léo Marjane
  - Incrédulité (lyrics by Maurice Vandair)
- Félix Marten
  - Rien dans les mains, rien dans les poches (lyrics by André Hornez)
    - Performed in the short-film Hôtel des Artistes : Saisie
- Monique Maurène
  - L’Amour ! L’Amour ! in the movie Soyez les bienvenus (lyrics by Jean Nohain)
    - Performed in the movie Soyez les bienvenus
- Armand Mestral
  - Le Beau Pedro in the movie Soyez les bienvenus (lyrics by Jean Nohain)
    - Performed in the movie Soyez les bienvenus
- Pierre Mingand
  - Rien dans les mains, rien dans les poches (lyrics by André Hornez)
- Yves Montand
  - C'est si bon (lyrics by André Hornez)
  - Mais qu’est-ce que j’ai ? (lyrics by Édith Piaf)
  - Maître Pierre (lyrics by Jacques Plante)
  - Rien dans les mains, rien dans les poches (lyrics by André Hornez)
- René Morel
  - L'Amour de Ninette (lyrics by Maurice Vandair)
  - Farandole en Provence (lyrics by Maurice Vandair)
  - Mam'zelle Printemps (lyrics by Maurice Vandair)
    - Performed in the operetta Mam'zelle Printemps
- Marcel Mouloudji
  - Y’a pas d’quoi (lyrics by André Hornez)
- Roger Nicolas
  - App’lez-moi l’Gérant (lyrics by André Hornez)
  - Les Baobabs (lyrics by André Hornez)
  - Baratin (lyrics by André Hornez)
    - Performed in the operetta Baratin
- Clairette Oddera
  - Si tu Voulais (lyrics by Maurice Vandair)
  - Toujours d'Accord (lyrics by Maurice Vandair)
    - Performed in the operetta Mam'zelle Printemps
- Paola
  - Maria (lyrics by Raymond Vincy)
  - Le Tambour du Régiment (lyrics by Raymond Vincy)
  - Toute Seule à Paris (lyrics by Raymond Vincy)
    - Performed in the operetta Maria Flora
- Jean Patart
  - Je Cherche une Étoile (lyrics by René Rouzaud)
  - Maître Pierre (lyrics by Jacques Plante)
- Jean Philippe
  - Les Étangs de Sologne (lyrics by Paul Vialar)
    - Performed in the TV Show Toute la Chanson
- Jacques Pills
  - Confidences (lyrics by Jean Boyer)
  - Je Cherche un Cœur (lyrics by Jean Boyer)
  - Mais où donc ? (lyrics by Jean Boyer)
    - Performed in the operetta L'École des Femmes Nues
  - Maître Pierre (lyrics by Jacques Plante)
    - Performed in the short-film Compositeurs et Chansons de Paris
  - Dictionnaire (lyrics by Jacques Pills)
  - Elle et Lui (lyrics by André Hornez)
- Rellys
  - Neuf fois sur Dix (lyrics by André Hornez)
    - Performed in the movie Amédée
- Michel Roger
  - Je Cherche une Étoile (lyrics by René Rouzaud)
  - Sérénade au Nuage (lyrics by Maurice Vandair)
- Tino Rossi
  - Il Fait Beau (lyrics by Jacques Mareuil)
  - Si j’Étais Marin (lyrics by Jacques Mareuil)
    - Performed in the operetta Le Marchand de Soleil
  - C'est Noël (lyrics by Jean Manse)
  - C'est si bon (lyrics by André Hornez)
  - Si tu Voulais m’Aimer (lyrics by André Hornez)
- Dominique Tirmont
  - Corps et Âme (lyrics by André Hornez)
  - Du Moment… (lyrics by André Hornez)
    - Performed in the operetta Baratin
- Tohama
  - Elle Chante (lyrics by René Rouzaud)
  - Maître Pierre (lyrics by Jacques Plante)
- Jean Vallin
  - Le Marché de Santa Cruz (lyrics by Raymond Vincy)
  - Maria (lyrics by Raymond Vincy)
    - Performed in the operetta Maria Flora
- Roger Varnay
  - Le Régiment des mandolines (lyrics by Maurice Vandair)

==== Songs composed in collaboration ====
- 1957 :
  - L'Auberge Fleurie, music written with Rolf Marbot, performed by Rudy Hirigoyen, orchestrated by Paul Bonneau.
- 1958 :
  - Si tu Voulais m'Aimer, music written with Jean-Pierre Landreau, performed by Tino Rossi, orchestrated by Pierre Spiers.
- 1959 :
  - Avec and Paris mes Amours, music written with Bruno Coquatrix, performed by Josephine Baker, orchestrated by Jo Bouillon.

==== Songs orchestrated ====
- 1941 :
  - Amuse-toi, Arc-en-Ciel, Le Régiment des Jambes Louis XV, Notre Espoir, On Veut tant s'Aimer and Vous ne Direz pas toujours Non (music by Jean Marion), performed by Maurice Chevalier.
- 1945 :
  - C'est la Fête au Pays (music by Henri Bourtayre), Chanson Populaire, Le p'tit Père la Taupe and Mandarinade, performed by Maurice Chevalier.
- 1948 :
  - Maître Pierre, performed by Yves Montand.
- 1950 :
  - Comment me Préférez-vous ?, Confidences, Je Cherche un Cœur and La Pagaïa, performed by Jacques Pills.
- 1963 :
  - Consuela, Marche Grecque, Mon Grand and Paris-Paname, performed by Jean-Pierre Darras and Philippe Noiret.

==== Songs performed ====
- 1946 :
  - Le Régiment des Mandolines (in duet with Jo Charrier), orchestrated by Jacques Hélian.
- 1949 :
  - Les Baobabs, orchestrated by Ray Ventura.
- 1950 :
  - Maître Pierre (at the radio), orchestrated by Paul Durand.

==== Songs adapted in English ====
- 1949 :
  - C'est si bon, lyrics by Jerry Seelen, performed by Johnny Desmond.
  - Mais qu’est-ce que j’ai ? (English title : What Can I Do ?), lyrics by Harold Rome, performed by Madelyn Russell.
- 1951 :
  - Maître Pierre (English title : The Windmill Song), lyrics by Mitchell Parish, performed by The Andrews Sisters.
- 1956 :
  - Donnez-moi tout ça (English title : Give Me More), lyrics by William Engvick, performed by Don Cherry.

=== Cinema ===
==== Film scores ====
- 1952 : Le Dernier Robin des Bois by André Berthomieu.
- 1953 : Cent francs par seconde by Jean Boyer.
- 1953 : Soyez les bienvenus by Pierre-Louis.
- 1953 : Le portrait de son père by André Berthomieu.
- 1954 : L'Œil en coulisses by André Berthomieu.
- 1954 : Les deux font la paire by André Berthomieu.
- 1955 : Les Duraton by André Berthomieu.
- 1956 : La Joyeuse Prison by André Berthomieu.
- 1956 : Baratin by Jean Stelli.
- 1956 : Honoré de Marseille by Maurice Régamey.
- 1957 : L'Auberge en folie by Pierre Chevalier.
- 1959 : Cigarettes, whisky et p'tites pépées by Maurice Régamey.
- 1959 : Visa pour l'enfer by Alfred Rode.

==== Television scores ====
- 1963 : La voix dans le verre by Lazare Iglesis.
- 1963 : L’un d’entre vous by Lazare Iglesis.
- 1963 : Blagapar : les Grecs by Lazare Iglesis.
- 1964 : Blagapar : les Contractuels by Jean-Paul Sassy.
- 1964 : Blagapar : Versailles by Lazare Iglesias.
- 1966 : L’école des cocottes by Lazare Iglesis.
- 1966 : Comment ne pas épouser un Milliardaire by Lazare Iglesis.
- 1966 : La Chasse au météore by Lazare Iglesis.
- 1970 : Ne vous fâchez pas Imogène by Lazare Iglesis.
- 1971 : La petite Catherine by Lazare Iglesis.

=== Operettas ===
- 1946–1947 : Mam'zelle Printemps by Maurice Poggi at the Théâtre Moncey, libretto by Georges-Marie Bernanose, lyrics by Maurice Vandair.
- 1949–1952 : Baratin by Alfred Pasquali at the Théâtre de l'Européen, libretto by Jean Valmy, lyrics by André Hornez.
- 1950–1951 : L'École des Femmes Nues by Max Révol at the Théâtre de l'Étoile, libretto by Serge Veber, lyrics by Jean Boyer.
- 1953–1954 : Mobilette by Jean-Marc Thibault at the Théâtre de l'Européen, libretto by Serge Veber, lyrics by André Hornez.
- 1957–1958 : Maria Flora by Maurice Lehmann at the Théâtre du Châtelet, libretto and lyrics by Raymond Vincy.
- 1969–1970 : Le Marchand de Soleil by Robert Manuel at the Théâtre Mogador, libretto by Robert Thomas, lyrics by Jacques Mareuil.

=== Theater ===
- 1958–1959 : Ta bouche bébé by Maurice Poggi at the Comédie-Caumartin, dialogues by Yvan Audouard and Jean Valmy.
- 1959–1960 : Ballets Rosses by Maurice Poggi at the Comédie-Caumartin, dialogues by Yvan Audouard and Jean Valmy.
- 1960–1961 : Vive de... by René Dupuy at the Théâtre Gramont, dialogues by Jacques Grello, Robert Rocca and Pierre Tchernia.
- 1960–1961 : Le Mobile by Jean-Pierre Grenier at the Théâtre Fontaine, dialogues by Alexandre Rivemale.
- 1961–1962 : Un certain Monsieur Blot by René Dupuy at the Théâtre Gramont, dialogues by Robert Rocca.
- 1961–1962 : Les Béhohènes by Jean-Pierre Darras at the Théâtre du Vieux-Colombier, dialogues by Jean Cosmos.

=== Revues ===
At the Casino de Paris

- 1942 : Pour toi Paris

At the Folies Bergère

- 1952–1954 : Une Vraie Folie.
- 1955–1957 : Ah ! Quelle Folie.
- 1958–1960 : Folies Légères.
- 1961–1963 : Folies Chéries.
- 1964–1967 : Folies en Fêtes.
- 1968–1971 : Et vive la Folie.
- 1972–1976 : J’Aime à la Folie.
- 1977–1981 : Folies, je t’Adore.
- 1982–1986 : Folies de Paris.

At the Le Lido

- 1956 : C’est Magnifique.
- 1957–1958 : Prestige.
- 1959–1960 : Avec Plaisir.
- 1961 : Pour Vous.
- 1962–1963 : Suivez-Moi.

At the Olympia

- 1959–1960 : Paris mes Amours.

At the Moulin Rouge

- 1963–1964 : Frou Frou.
- 1965–1966 : Frisson.
- 1967–1969 : Fascination.
- 1970–1972 : Fantastic.
- 1973–1975 : Festival.
- 1976–1978 : Follement.
- 1979–1982 : Frénésie.
- 1983–1988 : Femmes, Femmes, Femmes.

At the Broadway Theatre

- 1964 : Folies Bergère.

== Appearances ==
=== Cinema ===
==== Short film ====
- 1951 : Compositeurs et Chansons de Paris by Henri Verneuil.
- 1953 : Trois hommes et un piano by André Berthomieu.
- 1957 : Rendez-vous avec Maurice Chevalier n°2 by Maurice Régamey.
- 1960 : Le Rondon by André Berthomieu.

==== Feature film ====
- 1953 : Soyez les bienvenus by Pierre-Louis.
- 1954 : Les deux font la paire by André Berthomieu.
- 1954 : L'Œil en coulisses by André Berthomieu.

=== Television ===
==== Television show ====
- 1956 : 36 Chandelles (30 January) – RTF.
- 1956 : La Joie de Vivre (3 April) – RTF.
- 1957 : 36 Chansons (27 January and 10 March) – RTF.
- 1958 : 36 Chandelles (28 April) – RTF.
- 1959 : Les Joies de la Vie (6 April) – RTF.
- 1960 : Toute la Chanson (27 June) – RTF.
- 1960 : Rue de la Gaîté (20 October) – RTF.
- 1960 : Au-delà de l'Écran (23 October) – RTF.
- 1960 : Discorama (18 November) – RTF.
- 1968 : Tel quel (30 January) – ORTF.
- 1985 : Thé Dansant (9 June) – France 2.
- 1988 : Soir 3 (11 September) – France 3.
- 1988 : La Chance aux Chansons (15 September) – TF1.
- 1990 : Midi 3 (30 March) – France 3.
- 1993 : La Chance aux Chansons (15 and 16 March) – France 2.
- 2001 : Les Refrains de la Mémoire (30 September) – France 5.

==== Documentary film ====
- 1962 : Dans la Vie faut pas s'en Faire by Georges Folgoas – RTF.
- 1972 : Hommage à Maurice Chevalier by Georges Paumier – ORTF.
- 1979 : Nous les Artistes : Maurice Chevalier by Catherine Dupuis – TF1.

== Bibliography ==
- Henri Betti : Récit autobiographique, Embrasure, Paris, 1993.
- Henri Betti : une Vie en chansons, Paul Beuscher, Paris, 2006.

== Discography ==
- Les Chansons de ma Jeunesse : Henri Betti, Marianne Mélodie, Roubaix, 2016.
