= Rien dans les mains, rien dans les poches =

Single by Yves Montand
- Released: 1948
- Recorded: 10 December 1948
- Genre: Foxtrot
- Length: 3:05
- Label: Odeon
- Songwriters: Henri Betti (music), André Hornez (lyrics)

Rien dans les mains, rien dans les poches is a French popular song composed in 1948 by Henri Betti with the lyrics by André Hornez.

== Story ==
In 1948, Henri Betti, André Hornez, Paul Misraki and Ray Ventura were invited by Bruno Coquatrix to discuss a lawsuit that was declared by Eudore Rancurel for the music of the song Boléro that was composed by Paul Durand.

At the end of the discussion, Henri Betti played on the piano the seven notes of the musical scale and asked the others who was the author. Nobody answered him and Henri Betti declared that he appropriated them and that he will write a song. He used the Foxtrot genre that was fashionable to fit the seven musical notes then André Hornez will write the lyrics.

On December 10, 1948, Yves Montand recorded the song with Bob Castella and his Orchestra. On the other side of the disk, he recorded another song composed by Henri Betti : Maître Pierre (lyrics by Jacques Plante) but with an orchestra conducted by Henri Betti himself.

== Cover versions ==
On December 28, 1948, the Sœurs Étienne recorded the song with Raymond Legrand and his Orchestra. In 1994, they sang the song with Jean Sala and his Orchestra at the TV show La Chance aux chansons hosted by Pascal Sevran.

On January 4, 1949, Émile Carrara recorded the song with his Orchestra.

On February 3, 1949, Pierre Mingand recorded the song with Émile Stern and his Orchestra.

On March 20, 1949, Luc Barney recorded the song with Daniel White and his Orchestra.

On February 8, 1950, Henri Betti performed the piano song on the radio show Gala de Bernay.

The same year, Jula De Palma recorded the song with Bruno Quirinetta and his Orchestra with which she recorded two other hits by Henri Betti : C'est si bon (lyrics by André Hornez) and Maître Pierre (lyrics by Jacques Plante). Yvonne Blanc recorded the song this year as well.

In 1955, Fred Ermelin and his quintet play music in a medley for the album Festival Dancing where he also plays the music of C'est si bon.

In 1957, Louise Étienne sang the song with Georges Derveaux and his Orchestra at the TV show 36 Chansons hosted by Jean Nohain.

In 1985, Dominique Val sang the song with Robert Quibel and his Orchestra at the TV show Thé Dansant hosted by Charles Level.

== Filmography ==
In 1949, Félix Marten sang the song with Camille Sauvage and his Orchestra in the short film Hôtel des Artistes : Saisie directed by Jean Perdrix.

In 1954, the melody of the song is played in L'Œil en coulisses directed by André Berthomieu.
