= What Can I Do? (Edith Piaf song) =

"What Can I Do ? (Mais qu'est-ce que j'ai ?)"

Single by Madelyn Russell
- B-side: "Haunted"
- Released: March 1950
- Recorded: Chicago
- Genre: Foxtrot
- Length: 2:55
- Label: Mercury Records 5388
- Songwriters: Henri Betti (music), Édith Piaf (French lyrics), Harold Rome (English lyrics)

"What Can I Do?" ("Mais qu'est-ce que j'ai?") is a French popular song composed in 1947 by Henri Betti with the lyrics by Édith Piaf. The English lyrics were written in 1949 by Harold Rome.

== Story ==
In 1947, Édith Piaf and Yves Montand had just quit amicably and Édith Piaf had written the lyrics of a song in memory of their love story whose departure was "Mais qu'est-ce que j'ai à tant l'aimer que ça me donne envie de crier!". She asked Henri Betti to put the music on his lyrics inspired by the style of Yves Montand.

When they finished writing the song, Henri Betti left to propose it to Yves Montand and he also proposed to him "C'est si bon" that he had written with the lyrics of André Hornez at the same time "Mais qu'est-ce que j'ai?" and registered at the SACEM the same day (18 August 1947).

On 3 November 1947 Yves Montand recorded the song with Jean Marion and his Orchestra but before recording it in the studio, he sang the song at the Théâtre de l'Étoile on 9 October 1947.

On February 28, 1948, he sang the song at the Hotel Negresco during the first Nice Jazz Festival. At that evening, Suzy Delair sang "C'est si bon".

On 6 October 1958, he sang it again at the Théâtre de l'Étoile with Bob Castella and his Orchestra.

In 1959, he sang the song for the concert An Evening with Yves Montand presented at the Henry Miller's Theatre from September 22 to October 31. In 1961, he sang the song for another concert presented at the John Golden Theatre from October 24 to December 16.

== Cover versions ==
On 5 January 1948 Bernard Hilda recorded the song with his Orchestra. On the other side of the disk, he recorded "C'est si bon".

On 20 May 1948 Henri Betti performed the song on the piano on the radio program Un quart d'heure avec where he also performed "Dictionnaire" (lyrics by Jacques Pills) and "La Chanson du Maçon" (lyrics by Maurice Chevalier and Maurice Vandair).

In 1950, Nila Cara recorded the female version of the song, always with lyrics by Édith Piaf, for the album Les Chanteuses de la Place Pigalle.

In 1958, Léo Chauliac recorded the song with his Orchestra for the album 25 ans de succès.

In 1960, Roland Bourque recorded the song on the piano for the album Piano Moods à la Française.

In 1963, Henri Leca recorded a medley of music with his Orchestra for the album Surprise-Partie Monstre where he also recorded a medley of three other musics composed by Henri Betti: "La Polka des Barbus", "C'est si bon", and "Maître Pierre".

In 1965, Raymond Berthiaume recorded the song with Roger Gravel and his Orchestra for the album L'inoubliable. In 1958, he recorded "C'est si bon" with his instrumental group Les 3 Bars for the album Rêver. In 1993, he re-recorded "Mais qu'est-ce que j'ai ?" for the album Les Grands Succès.

In 2015, Lambert Wilson recorded the song with the musical arrangements by Bruno Fontaine for the album Wilson chante Montand.

In 2024, the granddaughter of former Canadian prime minister Brian Mulroney sang the song at his state funeral held at Notre-Dame Basilica in Montreal because it was his favorite song.

== Adaptation ==
In 1949, Harold Rome wrote the English lyrics and the song is recorded in March 1950 by Madelyn Russell with Mitch Miller and his Orchestra. The title song became "What Can I Do?".

== Filmography ==
In 1951, the narrator of Compositeurs et Chansons de Paris hums the song and he also hums "La Chanson du Maçon", "Le Régiment des mandolines", and "C'est si bon".

In 1953, the melody of the song is played by an orchestra in Soyez les bienvenus in which the melodie of "C'est si bon" is also played.

== Anecdotes ==
In 1925, a song with the same title was written by Henri Christiné (music) and Rip (lyrics) for Marie Dubas who performed in the operetta P.L.M played at the Théâtre des Bouffes-Parisiens.

In 1993, another song with the same title was written and performed by Christian Vidal.
