= Honoré de Marseille =

1956 film by Maurice Régamey

- Directed by: Maurice Régamey
- Written by: Jean Manse (screenplay & dialogue)
- Story by: Jean Manse; Yves Favier
- Produced by: Jacques Bar
- Starring: Fernandel
- Cinematography: Walter Wottitz
- Edited by: Christian Gaudin
- Music by: Henri Betti
- Color process: Eastmancolor
- Production companies: Cité Films; Protis Films
- Distributed by: Cocinor
- Release date: 5 December 1956
- Running time: 81 minutes
- Country: France
- Language: French

Honoré de Marseille is a 1956 French comedy musical film by Maurice Régamey and starring Fernandel.

== Plot ==
The story begins in 600 BC with the landing in a calque of a Phocéenne galley commanded by the warrior Honorius who, married by mistake the daughter of the Ligurian king, will found the city of Marseille. Honor, the first Marseilles, gives way to Honorius to tell us the hero-comic adventures of the siege of Marseille by the legions of Julius Caesar, which will lead to the invention of the petanque. Through successive leaps over the centuries, and in songs, Honoré tells us the history of the city of Phocea.

== Cast ==
- Fernandel as Honoré de Marseille / Protis Honorius
- Andrex as Pastèque
- Francis Blanche as Pasquale Marchetti
- Claire Diamant as Josette
- Jacqueline Leroux as Marité
- Julien Maffre as Le balayeur
- Hélène Tossy as Himself
- Yvonne Monlaur as Gyptis
- Robert Pizani as Baccala
- Michel Etcheverry as Bob
- Edmond Ardisson as Victor - le cafetier
- Maryse Patris as Toinette
- Henri Arius as Bonafous (as Arius)
- Marthe Marty as Himself
- Jenny Hélia as Mme. Marchetti (as Jenny Helia)
- Toursky as Himself
- Armandel as Himself
- Henri Crémieux as Garrigues (as Henri Cremieux)
- Rellys as Saturnin

== Songs ==
Songs composed by Henri Betti with lyrics by Jean Manse and performed by Fernandel with an orchestration by Paul Bonneau : Quel Plaisir ! Quel Travail !, Tout ça c'est Marseille, Oh ! Honoré and C'est Noël.

== Production ==
The song C'est Noël was sung in a scene that was cut at the editing. It was later sung by Tino Rossi and Georges Guétary.

== See also ==
- List of French films of 1956
