= His Father's Portrait =

1953 film

- Directed by: André Berthomieu
- Written by: André Berthomieu; Roger Pierre (dialogue script)
- Produced by: André Berthomieu; Gilbert Cohen-Seat
- Starring: Jean Richard; Michèle Philippe; Brigitte Bardot
- Cinematography: Georges Million
- Edited by: Gilbert Natot
- Music by: Henri Betti
- Release date: 1953
- Running time: 90 min.
- Country: France
- Language: French

His Father's Portrait (French: Le Portrait de son père) is a 1953 French comedy film starring Brigitte Bardot.

The film recorded 1,643,820 admissions.

== Cast ==
- Jean Richard as Paul
- Michèle Philippe as Marie
- Brigitte Bardot as Domino
- Mona Goya as Paul's mother
- Frédéric Duvallès as Le directeur
- Maurice Biraud as Didier
- Charles Bouillaud as Martin
- Philippe Mareuil as Michel
- Robert Rollis as Ferdinand
- Mona Dol as Domino's mother
- Max Elloy as Le chauffeur
- Paul Faivre as Le notaire
- Roger Pierre as Le présentateur (uncredited)

== Production ==
The music of the songs C'est si bon (1947) and Maître Pierre (1948) are used in the film. They were composed by Henri Betti and are his two biggest hits.

The song Le Beau Pedro performed by Armand Mestral was written by Henri Betti (music) and Jean Nohain (lyrics) for the film Soyez les bienvenus directed by Pierre-Louis the same year.
