= The Windmill Song =

"The Windmill Song (Maître Pierre)"

Single by The Andrews Sisters
- A-side: "The Three Bells"
- Released: October 1951
- Recorded: New York
- Genre: March
- Length: 3:00
- Label: Decca Records 27858
- Songwriters: Henri Betti (music), Jacques Plante (French lyrics), Mitchell Parish (English lyrics)

"The Windmill Song" is the English version of the French popular song "Maître Pierre", composed in 1948 by Henri Betti with the lyrics by Jacques Plante. "Maître Pierre" had already been recorded by numerous French performers when Mitchell Parish wrote the English lyrics in 1951, titled "The Windmill Song", which became popular in the United States when performed by The Andrews Sisters that year.

== Story ==
In 1948, Henri Betti met Jacques Plante at the SACEM who told him that he had the idea of writing a song referring to the 1947 strikes by coal miners in France. Plante told Betti that the song would speak about a young employee who works in the countryside in a mill which is directed by a man whose name is Maître Pierre. The employee is tired, and decides to leave and find a new job in Paris. Unable to find a job, he returns to the mill where he worked before. When he arrives at the mill and he sees the director again, he tells him : "Il fait bon chez vous Maître Pierre" ("It's good to be home, Master Pierre").

The song was a great success and the Ministry of Culture asked that the song be learned in schools.

== Cover versions ==
On November 16, 1948, Tohama recorded the song with Raymond Legrand and his Orchestra.

On December 10, 1948, Yves Montand recorded the song with an orchestra led by Henri Betti, the song's composer.

On January 5, 1949, Georges Guétary recorded the song with Marius Coste and his Orchestra. In 1974, he sang the song on the TV show Midi trente, in 1976 on the TV show Système deux with Jean Claudric and his Orchestra and in 1984 on the TV show Cadence trois with Jean-Claude Borelly and his Orchestra.

On January 21, 1949, Jacqueline François recorded the song with Guy Luypaerts and his Orchestra.

On January 28, 1949, Jean Patart recorded the song with Maurice Jeanjean and his Orchestra.

On February 14, 1949, Yvette Giraud recorded the song with Jacques-Henry Rys and his Orchestra.

On February 15, 1949, Louis Ferrari recorded the song with his Orchestra.

On March 28, 1949, Les Compagnons de la chanson recorded the song with Marc Herrand and his Orchestra.

On September 22, 1949, Jean Marco, Jo Charrier and Ginette Garcin recorded the song with Jacques Hélian and his Orchestra.

The same year, Lucille Dumont recorded the song with Allan McIver and his Orchestra.

In 1950, Betti sang the song with Paul Durand and his Orchestra on the radio program Paris Montréal and with piano on the radio program Gala de Bernay.

The same year, Linette Lemercier recorded the song with Marcel Cariven and his Orchestra. Les Quatre Barbus recorded the song with Daniel White and his Orchestra. Jula De Palma recorded the song with Bruno Quirinetta and his Orchestra.

In 1957, Betti, Andrex and Roger Lanzac sang the song with Georges Dervaux and his Orchestra on the TV show 36 Chansons.

In 1961, Fernand Gignac recorded the song with Roger Pilon and his Orchestra. The same year, Paulette Rollin recorded the song for the album Paulette Rollin Chante pour les Enfants.

In 1966, Les Trois Ménestrels sang the song with Raymond Lefèvre and his Orchestra on the TV show Le Palmarès des chansons.

In 1974, Marcel Amont sang the song on the TV show Toutankhamont.

In 1980, Jacqueline François and Jacques Martin sang the song with Robert Quibel and his Orchestra on the TV show Thé Dansant. In 1985, Charles Level performed the song on Thé Dansant.

In 1995, Sophie Darel recorded the song in duet with Pierre Perret for the album C'était les Années Bleues.

In 2013, Jean-Jacques Debout recorded the song with musical arrangements by Jacques Ferchit for the album Sous le Soleil des Guinguettes.

== Adaptation ==
In 1951, Mitchell Parish wrote the English lyrics for the recording of the song by The Andrews Sisters with Gordon Jenkins and his Orchestra. This adaptation is titled "The Windmill Song".

== Filmography ==
In 1951, Jacques Pills sang the song with an orchestra led by Henri Betti in Compositeurs et Chansons de Paris.

In 1953, the melody was played in Le Portrait de son père.

== Bibliography ==
- Henri Betti : Récit autobiographique, Embrasure, Paris, 1993.
- Henri Betti : une Vie en chansons, Paul Beuscher, Paris, 2006.
