= Jacques-Henry Rys =

French composer and conductor

Jacques-Henry Rys (1909–1960) was a 20th-century French composer and conductor.

In the late 1940s and during the 1950s, Jacques-Henry Rys was a renowned conductor of light music, who led many recordings for major pop stars of the era, including Luis Mariano, Andrex, Yvette Giraud, Georges Guétary. He also assumed control of many variety shows on the radio.

Jacques-Henry Rys became known by the quality of the orchestrations of the first operetta by Francis Lopez, which contributed to its success: La Belle de Cadix (1945) of which he conducted the first performances at the Casino Montparnasse, Andalousie (1947), Quatre jours à Paris (1948), Monsieur Bourgogne (1949), La Route fleurie (1952), Tête de Linotte (in collaboration with Paul Bonneau, 1957).

At the request of Germaine Roger, director of the Théâtre de la Gaîté-Lyrique, Jacques-Henry Rys wrote the musical score for two successful operettas: Colorado in 1950, and Pampanilla in 1954. He also collaborated with Henri Bourtayre on the composition of the operetta Les Chevaliers du ciel (1955).

Jacques-Henri Rys died prematurely in 1960, aged 51.

== Direction of operetta orchestras ==
- 1952: La Route fleurie with Georges Guétary, Bourvil, ...
