= C'est Noël =

Single by Fernandel

from the album Honoré de Marseille
- Released: 1956
- Recorded: 1956
- Genre: Christmas carol
- Length: 2:55
- Label: Decca
- Songwriter(s): Henri Betti (music), Jean Manse (lyrics)

"C'est Noël" is a French popular song composed in 1956 by Henri Betti with the lyrics by Jean Manse.

== Story ==
In 1956, Henri Betti composed the music for the film Honoré de Marseille in which he also composed the music of four songs with lyrics by Jean Manse, all of which are performed by Fernandel.

C'est Noël was one of the four songs that Fernandel sings in the film, but the scene was cut in the editing. So it appears only in the record released the same year with the other three songs of the film (Tout ça c'est Marseille, Quel plaisir ! Quel travail ! and Oh ! Honoré) all orchestrated by Paul Bonneau.

The melody of this song was written by Henri Betti when he became father of a girl in 1950. The scene where Fernandel sang this song was in a Christmas night decor where Claire Diamant, who played the role of his niece Josette, was sitting on her lap. The actress was six years old at the time of filming, which was the same age of Henri Betti's daughter.

== Cover versions ==
The same year, the song is recorded by Tino Rossi with Pierre Spiers and his Orchestra and by Georges Guétary with Jo Moutet and his Orchestra.

== See also ==
- List of Christmas carols
