= André Hornez =

French lyricist and screenwriter (1905–1989)

- Born: 12 May 1905; Lens, France
- Died: 9 March 1989 (aged 83); Le Perreux-sur-Marne, France
- Burial place: Faverolles
- Occupations: Lyricist, Screenwriter
- Years active: 1930–1983
- Notable work: "C'est si bon" (1947), "Rien dans les mains, rien dans les poches" (1948), "Give Me More" (1955)
- Style: Chanson, Operetta
- Spouse: Gisèle Fréry (m. 1963)

André Hornez (12 May 1905 – 9 March 1989) was a French lyricist and screenwriter.

Lyricist of Paul Misraki in the years 1930–1940 for which he writes many songs lyrics like Qu'est-ce qu'on attend pour être heureux? (1937), André Hornez then became the lyricist of Henri Betti in the years 1940–1950 for which he wrote the lyrics to C'est si bon (1947) and Rien dans les mains, rien dans les poches which were sung by Yves Montand.

== Biography ==
Born in Lens in 1905, André Hornez a passion early for architecture and writing. He finally chose writing. He began his career as secretary of Saint-Granier. For him, he writes books magazines and operettas. The author is also hired by Paramount company in Hollywood to write screenplays.

His first songs are composed by Paul Misraki and performed by Ray Ventura and Maurice Chevalier. As for Ray Ventura, they collaborate with lyricist for many years. Among the best-known songs from this collaboration are Ça Vaut Mieux que d'Attraper la Scarlatine (1936), Qu'est-ce qu'on Attend pour être Heureux? (1937), Comme tout le Monde (1938), Tiens, tiens, tiens ! (1939), Dans mon Cœur (1940), Maria de Bahia (1946) and La mi-août (1950).

In 1936, the song Tant qu'il y aura des Étoiles, performed by Tino Rossi, became a classic of French song. In the late 1930s, André Hornez also wrote for Rina Ketty (Sérénade sans Espoir, 1939) and Johnny Hess (Je suis Swing, 1939).

Screenwriter for film, he wrote a number of film lyrics like Avec son Tralala sung by Suzy Delair in Quai des Orfèvres (1947) by Henri-Georges Clouzot. His songs are performed by Yves Montand (Moi j'm'en Fous, Du Soleil plein la Tête), Lucienne Delyle (Mon Cœur Attendait, 1951), André Claveau (Malgré Tout, 1951) or Line Renaud (Ni Pourquoi ni Comment).

In 1947, he collaborated for the first time with the composer Henri Betti for to write the lyrics of C'est si bon. This song became an international jazz standard from the 1950s.

A large majority of the author's songs were written for the cinema or for operettas. Several of his songs have become immortal French song.

André Hornez died in Le Perreux-sur-Marne in 1989 and is buried with his wife in the cemetery of Faverolles.

== Personal life ==
On 5 July 1963, in Boulogne-Billancourt, André Hornez married the dancer Gisèle Fréry (1929–2013), whom he met on the operetta Baratin in 1949. His best man was Bruno Coquatrix. The couple had no children.

== Respects ==
- On 18 December 2003 a street in Lens, where he was born in 1905, was named after him.
- On 12 May 2007 a commemorative plaque bearing his name was placed on the facade of the building where he was born.

== Filmography ==
=== Screenwriter ===
- 1936 : Les Deux Favoris
- 1937 : Le Chanteur de minuit
- 1938 : My Priest Among the Rich
- 1939 : Tourbillon de Paris
- 1943 : Feux de joie
- 1947 : Are You Sure?
- 1950 : Nous irons à Paris
- 1950 : La Petite Chocolatière
- 1950 : King Pandora
- 1950 : Pigalle-Saint-Germain-des-Prés
- 1951 : Les Joyeux Pélerins
- 1951 : Never Two Without Three
- 1952 : My Priest Among the Rich
- 1953 : The Sparrows of Paris
- 1956 : Baratin

=== Lyricist ===
- 1933 : Monsieur Bébé
- 1934 : La Prison de Saint-Clothaire
- 1935 : Folies-Bergère de Paris
- 1938 : Belle Étoile
- 1938 : Retour à l'aube
- 1947 : Quai des Orfèvres
- 1950 : Pigalle-Saint-Germain-des-Prés
- 1951 : Nous irons à Monte Carlo
- 1952 : Une fille sur la route
- 1953 : L'Œil en coulisses
- 1954 : Le Fil à la patte
- 1956 : The Road to Paradise
- 1956 : Et Dieu… créa la femme

=== Director ===
- 1936 : Les Deux Favoris, with Georg Jacoby

== Operettas ==
- 1929 : Jim by Georges Ghestem, Opéra de Lille
- 1930 : Loulli by Georges Ghestem, Opéra de Lille
- 1936 : Normandie by Paul Misraki, Théâtre des Bouffes-Parisiens
- 1936 : Simone est comme ça by Raoul Moretti, Théâtre des Bouffes-Parisiens
- 1938 : La Féerie blanche by Casimir Oberfeld et Mitty Goldin, Théâtre Mogador
- 1948 : Le Chevalier Bayard by Bruno Coquatrix, Théâtre de l'Alhambra
- 1949 : Baratin by Henri Betti, L'Européen
- 1950 : M'sieur Nanar by Jean-Jacques Vital, Théâtre de l'Étoile
- 1953 : Mobilette by Henri Betti, L’Européen
- 1960 : La Petite Datcha by Georges Soria, Théâtre Gramont
