= Rendez-vous avec Maurice Chevalier n°2 =

- Directed by: Maurice Régamey
- Starring: Maurice Chevalier; Édith Piaf; Jacques Pills; José Torres; Jean-Claude Pascal; Hubert de Givenchy; Henri Betti
- Cinematography: Willy Faktorovitch; Jean Lehérissey
- Release date: 1957
- Running time: 23 minutes
- Country: France
- Language: French

Rendez-vous avec Maurice Chevalier n°2 is a French short film directed by Maurice Régamey in 1957.

== Synopsis ==
Maurice Chevalier visits several artists to discuss their work.

== Songs ==
- Mets Deux Thunes dans l'Bastringue (1954)
  - Music by Jean Constantin
  - Lyrics by Jean Constantin
  - Performed by Jacques Pills
- La Goualante du Pauvre Jean (1954)
  - Music by Marguerite Monnot
  - Lyrics by René Rouzaud
  - Performed by Édith Piaf
- La Vie en rose (1946)
  - Music by Louiguy
  - French lyrics by Édith Piaf
  - English lyrics by Mack David
  - Performed by Édith Piaf
- À Barcelone (1941)
  - Music by Henri Betti
  - Lyrics by Maurice Chevalier
  - Performed by Maurice Chevalier
- Parlez-moi d'amour (1930)
  - Music by Jean Lenoir
  - Lyrics by Jean Lenoir
  - Performed by Jean-Claude Pascal
- Mon p'tit Moustique (1954)
  - Music by Henri Betti
  - Lyrics by André Hornez
  - Performed by Maurice Chevalier

== Anecdote ==
Before Maurice Chevalier sings Mon p'tit Moustique, he hums three songs composed by Henri Betti : La Chanson du Maçon (lyrics by Maurice Vandair), Le Régiment des Mandolines (lyrics by Maurice Vandair) and C'est si bon (lyrics by André Hornez).
