= Jula De Palma =

Italian singer (born 1931)

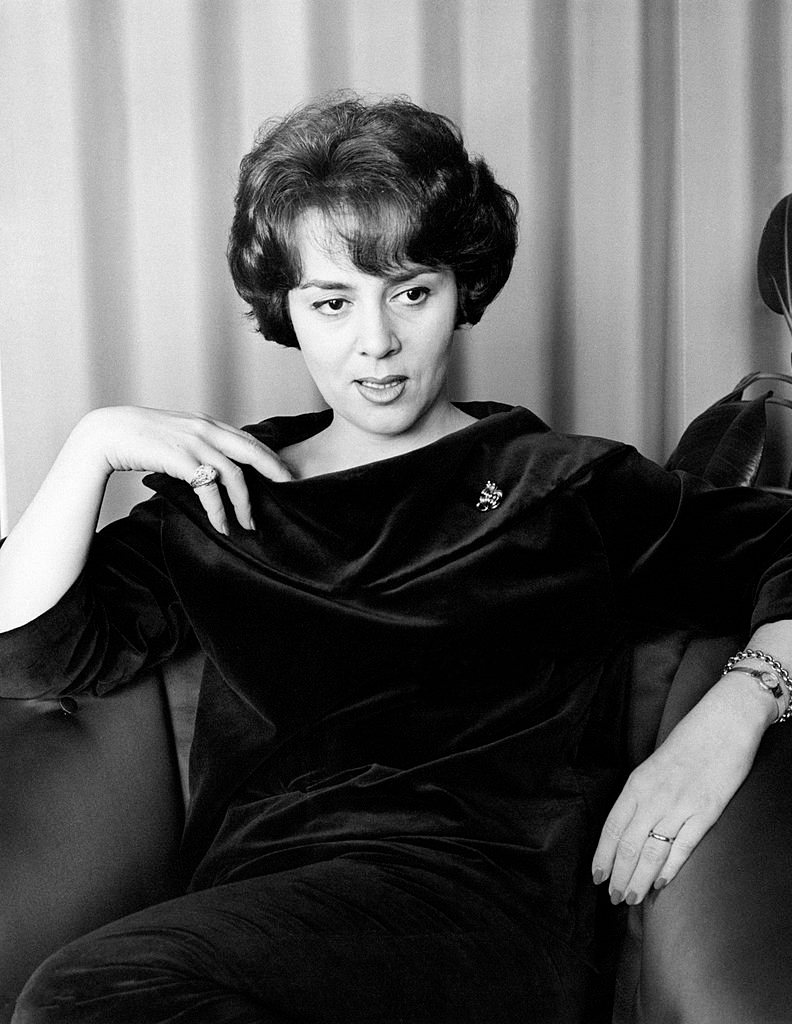
Jula de Palma in 1961

Iolanda Maria Palma (born 21 April 1931 in Milan), known as Jula De Palma, is an Italian singer.

== Biography ==
De Palma began her career in the early 1950s as a radio singer, collaborating with pianist, composer, and showman Lelio Luttazzi. Initially, she favored singing French songs like "C'est si bon," "Maître Pierre," or "Rien dans les mains, rien dans les poches" (composed by Henri Betti). She became popular for her strong voice and her interpretations of various jazz classics. Her albums "Jula in Jazz" (1958) and "Jula in Jazz 2" (1959) contained popular jazz and blues standards such as "I've Got You Under My Skin," "One for My Baby (and One More for the Road)," and "Blues in the Night."

In 1957, she married composer Carlo Lanzi. Two years later, she participated in the "Festival di Sanremo" where her passionate performance of the song "Tua" shocked the audience and the press. Due to its perceived "sexiness," she was barred from appearing on national television (RAI) for several years. In 1959, she starred in the film "Buone Vacanze". That same year, she performed at the 1959 Eurovision Song Contest, singing "Per tutta la vita".

In 1970, she performed at the renowned Sistina Theatre in Rome, singing classics like "That Old Black Magic," "I Won't Dance," and "St. Louis Blues". She also performed the bossa nova tune "Desafinado" and two songs famous by Mina: "Bugiardo e incosciente" and "Non credere." This performance was later released as the album "Jula al Sistino."

After many years of success, she decided to retire from music in 1974 and relocated to Canada with her family. However, in 2001, she made a brief comeback on Italian television, making a reappearance in the spotlight.

== Discography ==
- Strettamente Confidenziale - Album N. 1 (1955, CGD Records)
- Jula de Palma (1956, Columbia Records)
- Enamorada (1956, Discos Musart)
- Estrictamente Confidencial (1956, La Voz De Su Amo)
- Strettamente Confidenziale (1957, Columbia Records)
- Italy Sings! (with Enzo Amadori, 1957, Columbia Records)
- Quando Una Ragazza Si Chiama Jula (1958, Columbia Records)
- Jula De Palma A Sanremo (1959, Columbia Records)
- Jula De Palma (1959, Columbia Records)
- Le Venti Canzoni Del Decimo Festival Di Sanremo, 1960 (1960, La Voce Del Padrone)
- Hello Jula (1965, Surf Records)
- Whisky E Dixie (with the New Orleans Jazz Band) (1967, Cetra Records)
- Jula Al Sistino (Dal Vivo) (1970, RCA Italiana)
- Unforgettable Jula (2015, compilation CD, La Cupula Music)
- No Copacabana (with the Lelio Lutazzi orchestra) (Odeon Records)
