= Raymond Berthiaume =

Canadian musician (1931–2009)

- Berthiaume in 2005

Background information
- Born: May 9, 1931; Laval, Quebec, Canada
- Origin: Quebec, Canada
- Died: June 23, 2009 (aged 78) Montreal, Quebec, Canada
- Genres: Jazz
- Occupations: Jazz Singer, musician, producer, composer
- Label: Disques Mérite
- Website: Disque Mérite

Raymond Berthiaume (born May 9, 1931 and died June 23, 2009) was a Canadian jazz singer, musician, producer and composer from Quebec, Canada.

== Biography ==
Berthiaume was born in Laval, Quebec, on May 9, 1931. He studied piano and saxophone at College Laval. In 1948, he created an instrumental group named The Three Bars. The owner of the bar in which they performed suggested they select a vocalist, knowing that a singer would make the group more popular. Berthiaume was chosen, and became the group's vocalist. The move seemed to work, and the group was soon hailed as the best in the city. They played in the high-class nightclub El Morocco, where Frank Sinatra, Tony Bennett, and Vic Damone had all performed.

In 1954, the music label RCA Victor signed the trio, and they performed the Italian hit N'oublie Jamais (Never Forget), in French. This became a hit for the group, selling nearly 40,000 copies Despite the fame, Berthiaume preferred to spend time in recording studios then on stage.

In 1956, Berthiaume began to record music for advertising, notably Sweet Caporal cigarettes. On the back of this performance, he was in high demand to perform in commercials for other companies.

In 1968, he performed a French cover version of Frank Sinatra's The World We Knew, entitled Un Monde Avec Toi (A World With You), for which he won an award at the "Gala des artistes".

He died of cancer on June 23, 2009, in Montreal (Québec) after being hospitalized for ten days.

== Discography ==
Son quatuor vocal et instrumental (1960 – RCA Victor – LCP 1049)

- Moins que rien (Less Than Nothing)
- Demain, bientôt, toujours (Tomorrow, Soon, Forever)
- Bye bye Baby
- Que reste-t-il de nos amours (What's Left of Our Love)
- Passe ton chemin – À Bali – La vie mondaine (Passed Your Way, at Bali, the Ordinary Life)
- Si jolie (So beautiful)
- Clopin, clopant (Head over Heels)
- Sous le ciel de Paris (Under Paris Skies)
- Danse avec moi (Dance with Me)
- Marie

Chantons en choeur (1963 – RCA Victor Gala – CGPS 121)

- J'attendrai (I Will Wait)
- Je suis seul ce soir (I'm Lonely Tonight)
- C'est un mauvais garçon (That's a Bad Boy)
- Il est tard mon amour (It's Late, My Dear)
- Pourquoi (Why)
- Quand je danse avec toi (When I Dance With You)
- J'ai deux amours (I Have Two Loves)
- Sérénade portugaise (Portuguese Serenade)
- C'est magnifique (It's Marvelous)
- Heureux comme un (Happy As One)
- La vie en rose (Life in Pink)
- Vous qui passez sans me voir (You Who Pass Without Seeing Me)
- Moi, mes souliers (Me and my shoes)
- Le petit bonheur (The little happiness)
- Le chaland qui passe (The passing barge)
- J'aime les femmes c'est ma folie (Loving Women Is My Folly)
- Reviens (Come Back)
- Parlez-moi d'amour (Speak To Me Of Love)
- Je sais que vous êtes jolie (I Know You Are Happy)
- Symphonie (Symphony)

Chantons en choeur volume 2 (1963 – RCA Victor Gala – CGP 145)

- Chantons en choeur (Let's Sing Together)
- Maison dans la plaine (House on the Prairie)
- Qui sait, qui sait, qui sait (Who Knows, Who Knows, Who Knows)
- Pour notre amour (For Our Love)
- T'es mon soleil (You Are My Sunshine)
- Un jour tu verras (One Day, You Will See)
- C'est si doux (It's so tender)
- Si vous m'aimiez autant (If you would love me so)
- Aimer comme je t'aime (To Love As I Love)
- Sous le ciel bleu du Texas (Under The Blue Sky of Texas)
- Tout le long des rues (All Along the Streets)
- Image dans mon coeur (Image in My Heart)
- Une hirondelle (A swallow)
- Venez près de moi (Come Close To Me)
- Marie-Elena
- Après la pluie l'beau temps (After the rain the sunshine)
- La chanson du bonheur (Song of happiness)

Clarinette de danse (1965 – RCA Victor Gala – CGP 200)

- L'amour (Love)
- À San Francisco (In San Francisco)
- Days of wine and roses
- Des oeillets blancs (White eyes)
- Et pourtant (However)
- For me formidable
- Mélodie perdue (Lost Melody)
- Temps du muguet (Time of the lily of the valley)
- Fly me to the moon

Raymond Berthiaume Et Les 3 Bars : L'inoubliable (1965 – RCA Victor – LCP 1031)

- Chaland qui passe (The Barge passes)
- L'inoubliable (Unforgettable)
- Insensiblement (Unfeelingly)
- Mélancolie (Melancholy)
- Mais qu'est-ce que j'ai ? (What can I do ?)
- Que reste-t-il de nos amours (What Is Left of Our Loves)
- N'oublie jamais (Never Forget)
- Serenata (Serenade)
- Moulin rouge (Red Windmill)
- Quand l'amour meurt (When Love Dies)

Joie de vivre (1966 – RCA Victor – PCS 1012)

- Chante avec moi (Sing With Me)
- Fille d'Ipanema (The Girl From Ipanema)
- Joie de vivre (The Joy of Living)
- Jour après jour (Day After Day)
- Loin dans l'ombre du passé (Far in the Shadow of the Past)
- Quel beau roman d'amour (A Nice Story Of Love)
- Nous deux (We Two)
- Un homme est venu (A Man Has Come)
- Toi et moi (You And Me)

Un monde avec toi (1968 – Vedettes – VD 800)

- Alfie
- La dernière valse (The Last Waltz)
- Le fruit de la vie (The Fruit Of Life)
- Poupée de bonbon (Candy Doll)
- Prends la vie du bon côté ( )
- Près de toi (Close To You)
- Non, non-jamais (No, Not Ever)
- Mon grand ballon jaune (My Big, Yellow Balloon)
- Sous la pluie (In the rain)
- Si heureux (So Happy)
- Un monde avec toi (A World With You)

== CD discography ==
Cocktail Lounge (1998 – Disques Mérite : 22.7716)

- N'oublie jamais (Never Forget)
- Mona Lisa
- The very thought of you
- Parle plus bas (Speak More Softly)
- Dance ballerina dance
- Moonglow
- My kind of Girl
- Too young
- Fly me to the moon
- Inoubliable (Unforgettable)
- Don't get around much anymore
- Rien n'a changé (Nothing Has Changed)
- Nature boy
- Prétend (Pretend)
- Sweet Lorraine
- Un monde avec toi (A World With You)
- It had to be you
- My funny valentine

Les grands succès (1999 – Disques Mérite : 22.7714 – Compilation)

- Un monde avec toi (A World With You)
- N'oublie jamais (Never Forget)
- Parle plus bas (Speak More Softly)
- Une histoire d'amour (A Story Of Love)
- Non, non, jamais (No, Not Ever)
- Un air sur mon piano (A Tune on My Piano)
- Près de toi (Close To You)
- Alfie
- Smile
- Le dernier tango à Paris (Last Tango in Paris)
- L'été 42 (Summer of '42)
- Dis-lui (Tell Him)
- L'amour est passé dans ma vie (Love Has Passed in My Life)
- Pour les amants (For Lovers)
- Nous allons voler jusqu'au soleil (We'll Fly to the Sun)
- Mon grand ballon jaune (My Big, Yellow Balloon)
- Le fruit de la vie (The Fruit Of Life)

Noël et toi (2000 – Disques Mérite : 22.7725)

- Joyeux Noël (Merry Christmas)
- Noël et toi (Christmas And You)
- Le bonhomme hiver (Old Man Winter)
- Petit papa Noël (Little Father Christmas)
- Mon beau sapin (My beautiful firtree)
- Have yourself a merry little Christmas
- Vive le vent (Long live the wind)
- Noël blanc (White Christmas)
- C'est l'hiver (It's Winter)
- Au pays de l'espoir (In The Land Of Hope)
- Les enfants oubliés (The Forgotten Children)
- On croit toujours un peu au Père Noël (You Always Believe A Little in Father Christmas)

Mélancolie (2001 – Disques Mérite : 22.1151- Compilation)

- Musique et soleil (Music And Sun)
- Le goût de toi (The Taste Of You)
- Laisse-moi le temps (Allow Me The Time)
- Tout doit changer (Everything Should Change)
- Que feras-tu de ta vie (What Will You Do With Your Life)
- Serait-ce le bonheur (Should that be luck)
- Je ne vivrai jamais loin de toi (I Could Never Live Far From You)
- Le p'tit hôtel (The Little Hotel)
- Réponds-moi (Answer Me)
- Sentimental reasons
- Insensiblement
- Mélancolie (Melancholy)
- Moulin rouge (Red Windmill)
- Serenata (Serenade)
- Malgré tout (Despite It All)
- Que reste-t-il de nos amours (What's Left Of Our Loves)

Une voix, un piano (2003 – Disques Mérite : 22.7717) (Raymond Berthiaume et Georges Tremblay)

- Vous qui passez sans me voir (You Who Pass Without Seeing Me)
- Le soleil et la lune (The Sun and the Moon)
- Fascination
- S'aimer d'amour (Love Love)
- J'attendrai (I Will Listen)
- Viens au creux de mon épaule (Lean on me)
- Tu te souviendras de moi (You Will Remember Me)
- Un jour tu verras (One Day, You Will See)
- Toi tu m'comprends (You Understand Me, You)
- C'est pas parc'que c'est nous (It's Because It Is Us)
- Parlez-moi d'amour (Speak To Me Of Love)
- Tu n'peux pas t'figurer (YOu can't imagine)
- Trois fois merci (Three Times Thanks)
- Les feuilles mortes (Dead Leaves)
- Téléphone-moi chérie (Call Me, Dear)
- Bye bye baby
