= Dangerous Turning =

1955 film

- Directed by: Robert Bibal
- Written by: Robert Bettoni; Robert Bibal; André Tabet
- Produced by: Charles Bauche; Jean-Pierre Frogerais
- Starring: Viviane Romance; Philippe Lemaire; Armand Mestral
- Cinematography: Pierre Dolley
- Edited by: Victor Grizelin
- Music by: Louiguy
- Production companies: Films Printania; Productions Sigma; Record Film
- Distributed by: Productions Sigma
- Release date: 28 December 1954
- Running time: 97 minutes
- Countries: France; Italy
- Language: French

Dangerous Turning (French: Le tournant dangereux) is a 1954 French-Italian drama film directed by Robert Bibal and starring Viviane Romance, Philippe Lemaire and Armand Mestral.

== Cast ==
- Viviane Romance as Lucienne Courtois
- Philippe Lemaire as Freddy
- Armand Mestral as Daniel Courtois
- Maria Pia Casilio as Paquita Simoni
- Enrico Glori as Simoni, le brigadier
- Guy Decomble as Monsieur Léon
- Georges Aminel
- Charles Blavette
- Dany Caron
- Robert Berri
- Huguette Doriane
- Henri Arius
- Antonin Berval

== Bibliography ==
- Chiti, Roberto & Poppi, Roberto. Dizionario del cinema italiano: Dal 1945 al 1959. Gremese Editore, 1991.
