= Paul Vialar =

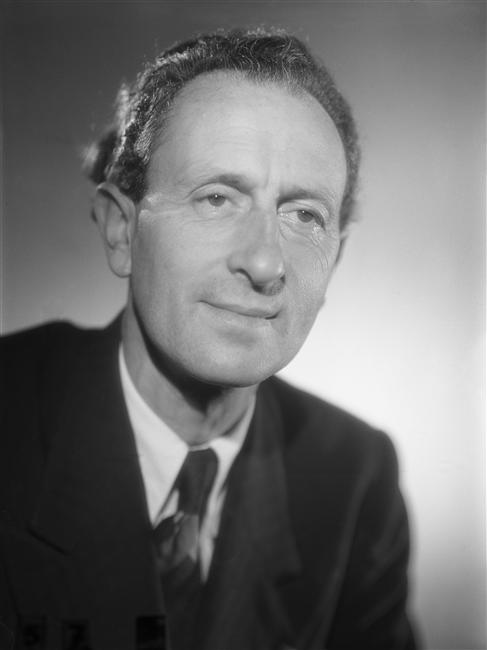
- Paul Vialar in 1948.
- Born: 18 September 1898; Saint-Denis, Seine-Saint-Denis, Paris, France
- Died: 8 January 1996 (aged 106); Vaucresson, Paris, France
- Education: HEC Paris
- Occupations: Novelist; Dramatists

Paul Vilar (French pronunciation: [pɔl vjalaʁ]; 18 September 1898 – 8 January 1996) was a French author and writer of novels, tales and essays.

In 1960, he wrote the lyrics for the song Les Étangs de Sologne with music by Henri Betti which was sung the same year by Jean Philippe in the TV show Toute la Chanson.

Paul Vialar was a graduate of HEC Paris.

== Books written by Paul Vialar ==
- Fatôme (1931)
- J'avais un camarade (1936)
- Soir, pièce en 1 acte... [Paris, Radio-Paris, 20 février 1938] (1938)
- La Rose de la mer (1939)
- La maison sous la mer (1941)
- La grande meute (1943)
- La Caille (1945)
- Job (1946)
- Une ombre (1946)
- Le voilier des Îles (livre pour enfants, 1947)
- La mort est un commencement (Grand Prix de la Ville de Paris, 1948) 8 vol. :
1. Le Bal des sauvages
2. Le Clos des trois maisons
3. Le Petit Jour
4. Les Morts vivants
5. Risques et périls
6. La Carambouille
7. Dansons la capucine
8. La Haute Mort
- Écrit sur le sable (1948)
- Le Château du hasard (1948)
- Le bon Dieu sans confession (sous-titre : Monsieur Dupont est mort) (1949)
- Le Bouc étourdi (1949). Les Bibliophiles de France
- La Grande Ribaude (1951)
- L'Éperon d'argent (1951)
- La Chasse aux hommes (1952/1953) 10 vol. :
1. Le Rendez-vous
2. La Bête de chasse
3. Les Brisées hautes
4. Le Bien-aller
5. Les Faux-fuyants
6. Les Odeurs et les sons
7. Le Débucher
8. Les Fins dernières
9. L'Hallali
10. La Curée
- Chronique française du XXe siècle (1955/1961) 10 vol. publiés chez Del Duca :
1. Les étoiles de Mars (1955)
2. Place de la République (ou Les députés) (1956)
3. Rideau (1956)
4. La boutiquière (1957)
5. Belada, éditeur (1957)
6. Pas de pitié pour les cobayes (1958)
7. Pas de temps pour mourir (1958)
8. Les robes noires (1958)
9. Les Zingari (Ceux du cirque) (1959)
10. La farine du diable (1961)
- Cinq hommes de ce monde (1954)
- Le Roman des Oiseaux de Chasse, Flammarion (1958)
- Le Temps des imposteurs
- Le fusil à deux coups (1960)
- L'homme de chasse (1961)
- La Jeunesse du monde (1966)
- Lettre ouverte à un jeune sportif
- La Cravache d'or (1968)(voir Yves Saint-Martin)
- Les Invités de la chasse (1969)
- Plumes dans le vent (illustrations de Henri de Linares)
- La Croule (1974)
- L'Enfant parmi les hommes (souvenirs, 1990)
