= Whirlwind of Paris =

1939 film

- Directed by: Henri Diamant-Berger
- Written by: André Hornez; Jean Nohain
- Produced by: Ray Ventura
- Starring: Ray Ventura; Mona Goya; Grégoire Aslan
- Cinematography: Fred Langenfeld
- Edited by: Christian Gaudin; Charlotte Guilbert
- Music by: Paul Misraki
- Production company: Les Films Albert Lauzin
- Distributed by: Mercury Films
- Release date: 13 December 1939
- Running time: 88 minutes
- Country: France
- Language: French

Whirlwind of Paris (French: Tourbillon de Paris) is a 1939 French musical comedy film directed by Henri Diamant-Berger and starring Ray Ventura, Mona Goya and Grégoire Aslan. The film's sets were designed by the art directors Guy de Gastyne and Robert Gys.

== Synopsis ==
A group of students from Grenoble University form an orchestra and try to gain work in Paris.

== Cast ==
- Ray Ventura as himself
- Fernand Charpin as Charbonnier
- Marguerite Pierry as Mme. Charbonnier
- Mona Goya as Marie-Claude
- Jean Tissier as Rosales
- Paul Misraki as Paul
- Claire Jordan as Mony
- Ludmilla Pitoëff as Mony
- Grégoire Aslan as Coco
- Jimmy Gaillard as Un collégien
- Robert Ozanne as Julot
- Paul Demange as Le commissaire
- André Dassary as Un collégien
- Pierre Feuillère as Le compositeur
- Madeleine Suffel asLa caissière
- Claire Gérard as La concierge
- Georges Bever as Le machiniste
- Milly Mathis as Pâquerette
- Marcel Vallée as Barigoul
- Jeanne Fusier-Gir as Mme Marceline
- Marthe Mussine as La deuxième secrétaire
- Georges Flateau as Le barman
- André Nicolle as Le médecin
- Georges Paulais as Le pilote

== Bibliography ==
- Powrie, Phil & Cadalanu, Marie . The French Film Musical. Bloomsbury Publishing, 2020.
