= Pierre Perret =

French musician (born 1934)

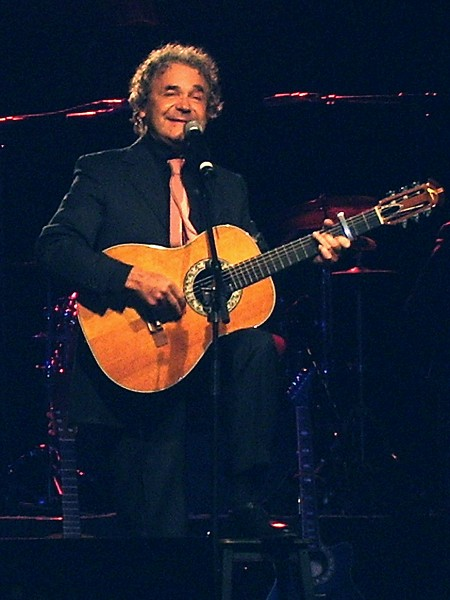

Background information
- Born: 9 July 1934 (age 91); Castelsarrasin, Occitanie, France
- Genres: French popular music
- Occupations: Singer, songwriter, musician, actor
- Instruments: Guitar, saxophone
- Years active: 1956–present
- Labels: Barclay, Vogue, Adèle, Carrère, Def Jam
- Website: pierreperret.fr

Pierre Perret (born 9 July 1934 in Castelsarrasin, Tarn-et-Garonne) is a French singer and composer. He lives in Nangis, France.

== Biography ==
Perret spent much of his childhood in a café which his parents owned, where he learned to use jargon and slang. At the age of 14 he signed with the conservatoire de musique de Toulouse and to a dramatic arts institute. But he was not admitted to the Conservatoire national supérieur de musique et de danse de Paris because he had experienced disciplinary problems administered by military justice during military service. In the meantime, he set up his first band of four musicians in his own name; they performed at events throughout the region. In 1957, he was snapped up by Eddie Barclay, a producer who signed him. He met his future wife, Simone Mazaltarim at Barclay's studio.

In 1958, Perret continued to tour Parisian cabaret bars crossing France and Africa as a part of the American group, The Platters. In November of that year, a pleurisy forced him to take two years off recuperating in a sanatorium.

A master of the subtleties of the French language and French slang (he even rewrote some of Jean de La Fontaine's fables), Perret's songs are often cheeky (for example Le zizi (The willy). They occasionally ask questions in a seemingly naive child's tone, but he has written more serious political songs like La bête est revenue, La petite kurde, Vert de Colère or Lily.

In 1995, Perret recorded a duet with Sophie Darel; they sang the French song Maître Pierre for the album C'était les Années Bleues. He participated in the committee for the simplification of the administrative language (COSLA).

== Discography ==
=== Albums ===
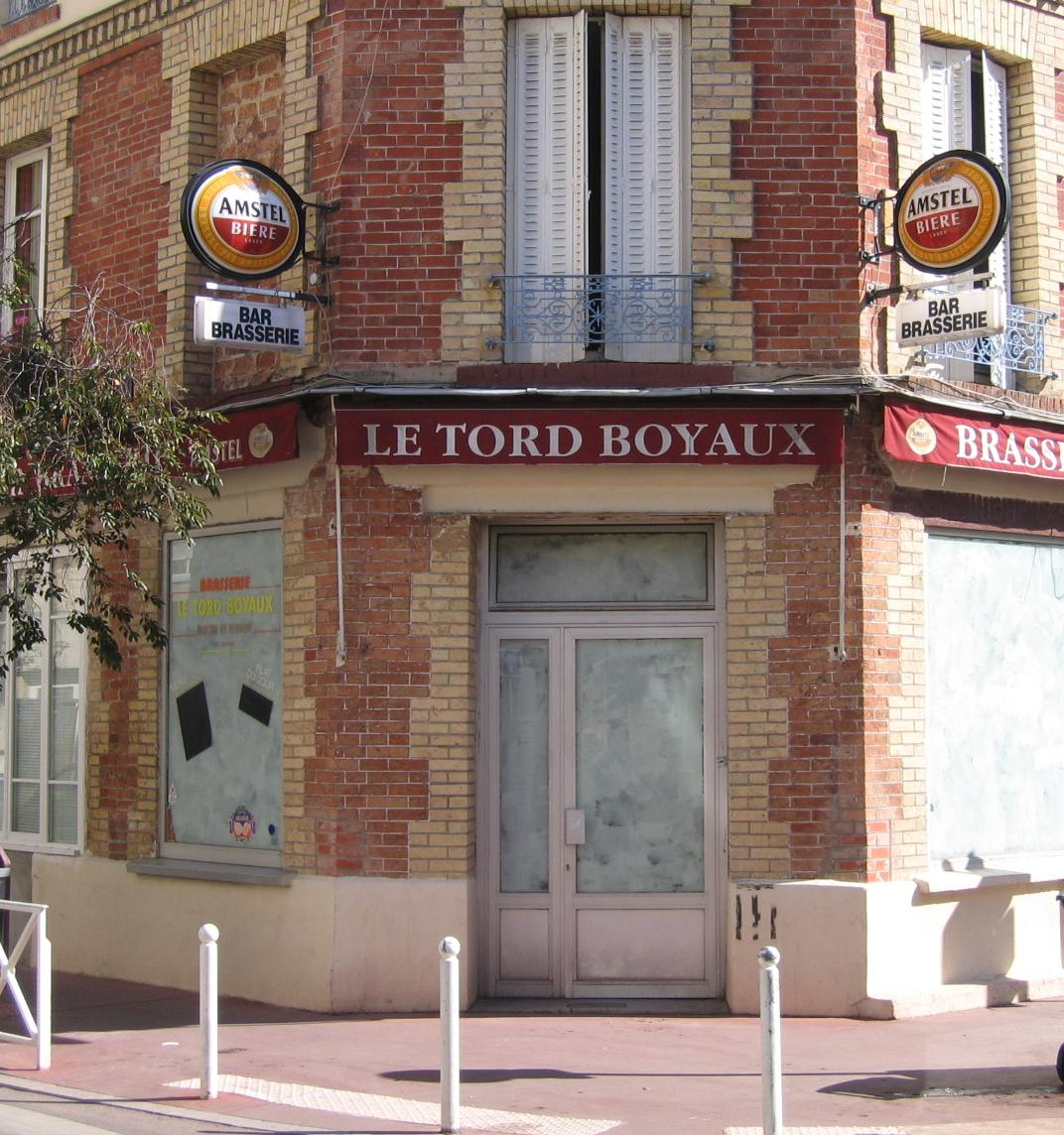
Le Tord Boyaux, café à Montrouge

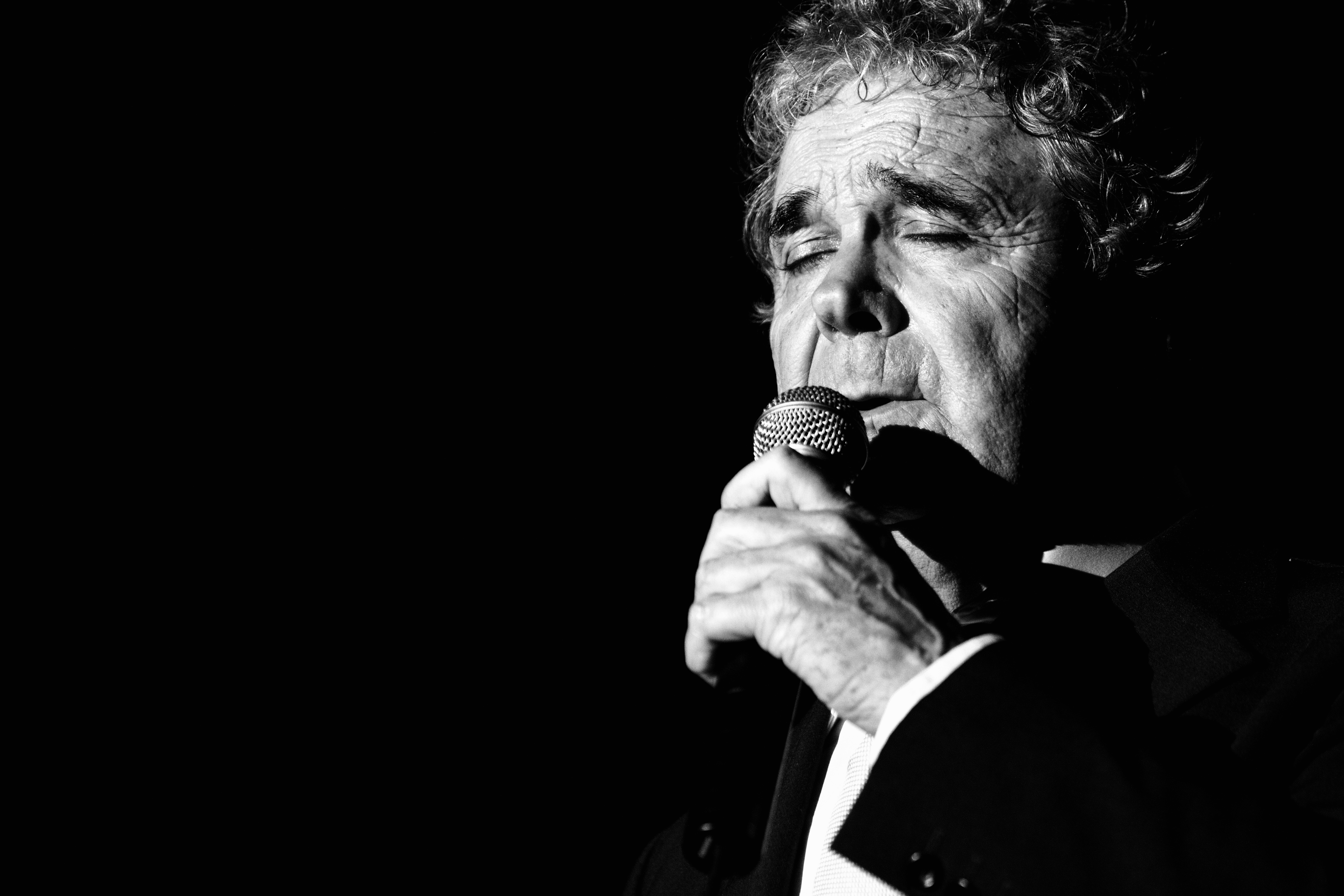
Pierre Perret during Festival de la chanson française du Pays d'Aix 2010

Studio albums

- 1957 : Moi j'attends Adèle
- 1958 : 1 (dont 5 titres de l'album précédent)
- 1960 : Joséphine
- 1964 : Le Tord-Boyaux
- 1965 : Mon Petit Amour
- 1968 : Enregistré en public à L'Olympia
- 1970 : Cuvée 71
- 1971 : La Cage aux Oiseaux
- 1973 : Le Plombier
- 1973 : En public
- 1974 : Le Zizi
- 1976 : Celui d'Alice
- 1977 : Lily
- 1979 : Mon P'tit Loup
- 1979 : À Bobino
- 1981 : C'est l'Printemps !
- 1983 : Comment c'est la Chine ?
- 1984 : Bobino 84 (double album)
- 1986 : Irène !
- 1987 : Chansons buissonnières (Interdit aux plus de 12 ans) (with Chanson de la bande à B.D.)
- 1987 : Pierrot à l'Olympia (double album)
- 1989 : Ce soir c'est fête – Coeur cabossé
- 1992 : Bercy Madeleine
- 1994 : Récital du Casino de Paris (double CD)
- 1995: Chante 20 fables inspirées de Jean de La Fontaine – Versions Pierrot
- 1995 : Chansons Éroticoquines (rereleased in 1999 with 4 new bonus tracks)
- 1997 : Casino de Paris (double CD)
- 1998 : La Bête est Revenue
- 2002 : Çui-là
- 2005 : Live au Casino de Paris (CD + DVD)
- 2006 : Mélangez-vous
- 2007 : Le Plaisir des Dieux – Anthologie de la chanson paillarde
- 2008 : Les Dieux Paillards (double CD)
- 2010 : La Femme Grillagée
- 2014 : Drôle de poésie!
- 2015 : Mes femmes

Compilation albums

- 1967 : Les deux visages de Pierre Perret (compilation + 3 new tracks including "Les postières" with vocals by Nicole Croisille)
- 1975 : 15 ans de chansons (6 albums set, 72 tracks including 39 rerecorded in 1975)
- 1994 : Pierrot l'intégrale (9 CDs for period 1970–1992, with 5 new tracks of the year 1992)
- 2007 : 50 ans de chansons (à l'Olympia) (2 CDs including 38 live tracks + DVD)
- 2011 : L'intégrale (29 CDs + 1 DVD)
- 2013 : L'âge de Pierre (3 CDs)

=== Songs ===
- 1963: "Le tord boyaux"
- 1963: "La corrida"
- 1963: "Pépé la jactance"
- 1966: "Les jolies colonies de vacances"
- 1967: "Tonton Cristobal"
- 1967: "Marcel"
- 1967: "Mimi la douce"
- 1967: "Blanche"
- 1970: "Fillette le bonheur c'est toujours pour demain"
- 1971: "Dépêche-toi mon amour"
- 1971: "La cage aux oiseaux"
- 1971: "La grande ourse"
- 1971: "Ma femme"
- 1971: "Olga"
- 1973: "Françouèse"
- 1974: "À poil:"
- 1974: "Le Zizi"
- 1974: "L'infidèle"
- 1974: "Ma p'tite Julia"
- 1976: "Ma nouvelle adresse"
- 1976: "Vaisselle cassée"
- 1977: "Lily"
- 1977: "Au Café du Canal"
- 1979: "Estelle"
- 1979: "L'hôpital"
- 1979: "Mon p'tit loup"
- 1981: "Y'a cinquante gosses dans l'escalier"
- 1986: "Nos amies les bêtes"
- 1989: "Riz pilé"
- 1992: "Bercy Madeleine"
- 1992: "La petite Kurde"
- 1998: "La bête est revenue"
- 2011: "La femme grillagee"

=== Books ===
- 1982: Le Petit Perret illustré par l'exemple (dictionnaire de l’argot); Livre de Poche, nouvelle édition, 1985
- 1992: Laissez chanter le petit (biographie)
- 1996: La cuisine de ma femme
- 2000: Anthologie de la poésie érotique
- 2003: Le parler des métiers (vocabulaire de 145 professions)
- 2005: Le Café du Pont : Parfums d'enfance (autobiographie)
- 2007: Les Petits Métiers d’Atget à Willy Ronis, éditions Hoëbeke
- 2007: Le Perret gourmand, éditions Le cherche midi
- 2008: A capella, éditions Le cherche midi

=== Television ===
"Capitaine Marleau", French television crime drama series; (2018, Season 1 Episode 12, 23 October, "Double Jeu", "Double Dealing", as Monsieur Pellison); Capitaine Marleau
