= Jean Marco =

French singer and composer

- Born: Jean Marcopoulos; 17 December 1923; Constantinople, Turkey
- Died: 24 June 1953 (aged 29); Connerré, France
- Occupations: Singer composer
- Years active: 1946–1953
- Known for: C'est si bon Maître Pierre
- Style: Chanson

Jean Marco (born Jean Marcopoulos; 17 December 1923 – 24 June 1953), was a French singer and composer.

Lead singer of the orchestra of Jacques Hélian from 1947 to his death in 1953, Jean Marco is the first performer of C'est si bon in 1948.

== Biography ==
Jean Marc was born in 1923 in Constantinople. His Greek parents came to settle in Paris.

In 1936, he joined the Mané (The Little Singers of Paris) located in the 20th arrondissement of Paris. There was one of two or three choral conductors of the part of sopranos. With Mané, he sang in Morocco, Tunisia, Germany, Italy, Switzerland, Belgium and throughout France. At the time, the group of the Boys Choir was divided into 4 patrols heritage of Scouting. Each patrol was a great musician name. Jean Marco belonged to the patrol Vincent d'Indy.

In 1939, he learned tailoring. Passionate guitar, he took lessons with guitarist Johnny Sabrou. His decision was made: he will be a singer. In 1945, his guitar in hand, he travels the roads of France, sings in galas and in military circles inter-allies. In 1946, he performed in cabarets, did internships in orchestras, composes and records his first songs.

In 1947, his publisher Jean Solar encourages him to present his works to Jacques Hélian who was immediately captivated by her voice and personality. After listening, he engages in his band as featured singer. From 1948 to 1953, he continues to successfully tours across the world. It records as a soloist, nearly 130 songs, including some creations remain great success as C'est si bon and Maître Pierre (both composed by Henri Betti). He was the first of his generation to create a new crooner style.

Jean Marco died in a car accident during the night of 24 June 1953 in Connerré. In his car were also present Georges Cloud (died) and Jacky Bamboo (injured) who were also members of the orchestra of Jacques Hélian.

The following year, in La Joie de vivre of Monseigneur Maillet in theater of the Alhambra, Jacques Hélian came with his orchestra to evoke his memory.

Jean Marco is buried in the cemetery of Belleville in Paris.
