= Faverolles, Eure-et-Loir =

Faverolles
- Commune
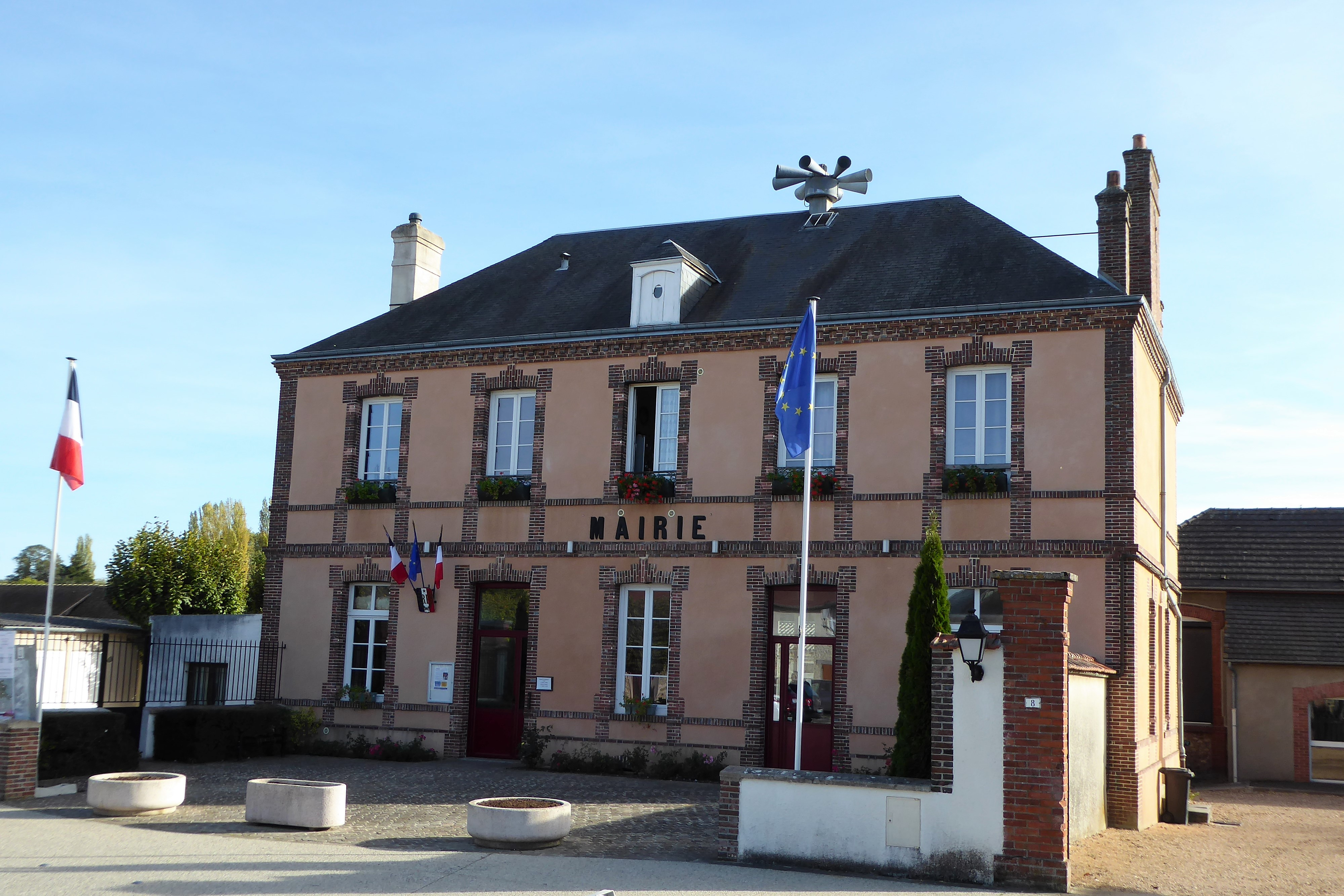
- The town hall in Faverolles

- Coat of arms
- Location of Faverolles
- Location within France Location within Centre-Val de Loire
- Coordinates: 48°41′18″N 1°34′45″E
- Country: France
- Region: Centre-Val de Loire
- Department: Eure-et-Loir
- Arrondissement: Dreux
- Canton: Épernon
- Intercommunality: Portes Euréliennes d'Île-de-France

Government
  - Mayor (2020–2026): Patrick Oczachowski
- Area^{1}: 9.94 km^{2} (3.84 sq mi)
- Elevation: 150 m (490 ft)
- Highest elevation: 168 m (551 ft)
- Lowest elevation: 124 m (407 ft)
- Population (2023): 820
  - Density: 82/km^{2} (210/sq mi)
- Time zone: UTC+01:00 (CET)
  - Summer (DST): UTC+02:00 (CEST)
- INSEE/Postal code: 28146 /28210
- ^{1} French Land Register data, which excludes lakes, ponds, glaciers > 1 km^{2} (0.386 sq mi or 247 acres) and river estuaries.

Faverolles (French pronunciation: [favʁɔl]) is a commune in the Eure-et-Loir department in northern France. The Faverolles chicken breed is named after it.

André Hornez, lyricist of C'est si bon, Qu'est-ce qu'on attend pour être heureux ?, Ça vaut mieux que d'attraper la scarlatine, Tiens, tiens, tiens, Avec son tralala, Je suis swing, lived in Mesnil-Condit until his death in 1989 and is buried there.

== Population ==
Historical population
Year	Pop.	±% p.a.
1968	326	—
1975	369	+1.79%
1982	411	+1.55%
1990	594	+4.71%
1999	767	+2.88%
2007	833	+1.04%
2012	934	+2.32%
2017	865	−1.52%
2023	820	−0.89%
Source: INSEE

== See also ==
- Communes of the Eure-et-Loir department
