= Soyez les bienvenus =

1953 film by Pierre-Louis

- Directed by: Pierre-Louis
- Written by: Pierre-Louis
- Produced by: Robert de Nesle
- Starring: Jean Nohain; Raymond Bussières
- Cinematography: Fred Langenfeld
- Music by: Henri Betti
- Release date: 1953
- Running time: 85 minutes
- Country: France
- Language: French

Soyez les bienvenus or L'Autocar en folie is a 1953 French comedy film by Pierre-Louis.

== Plot ==
The leading coach the company of Jean Nohain make a program fails in a small village. The people immobilize the troops to force him to do the show there.

== Cast ==
- Jean Nohain : himself
- Raymond Bussières : Monsieur Rossignol
- Annette Poivre : Annette Rossignol
- Sophie Sel : Sophie Rossignol
- Pauline Carton : Mademoiselle Lulu
- Philippe Olive : Monsieur Leduc
- Pierre-Louis : Max Burd
- Pierre Olaf : Monsieur Patin
- Christiane Jacquier : herself
- Catherine Agier : Catherine Rossignol
- Michel Nastorg : Michaud
- Alexandre Dréan : himself
- Armand Mestral : himself
- Henri Betti : himself (uncredited)
- Emmanuel Cheval : himself (uncredited)
- Danny Kane : himself (uncredited)
- Roger Lanzac : himself (uncredited)
- André Leclerc : himself (uncredited)
- Monique Maurène : herself (uncredited)
- René Pascal : himself (uncredited)
- Édouard Rousseau : himself (uncredited)
- Jean Yonnel : himself (uncredited)

== Songs ==
- La Pluie et le Beau Temps
  - Music by Henri Betti
  - Lyrics by Jean Nohain
  - Performed by Christiane Jacquier
  - Orchestrated by Guy Luypaerts
- Ollé, Ollé... Tickets, Tickets...
  - Music by Henri Betti
  - Lyrics by Jean Nohain
  - Performed by Roger Lanzac
  - Orchestrated by Guy Luypaerts
- La Fontaine de Saint Eloi
  - Music by Henri Betti
  - Lyrics by Jean Nohain
  - Performed by Christiane Jacquier
  - Orchestrated by Guy Luypaerts
- L'Amour ! L'Amour !
  - Music by Henri Betti
  - Lyrics by Jean Nohain
  - Performed by Monique Maurène
  - Orchestrated by Guy Luypaerts
- Touchant, Touchant
  - Music by Henri Betti
  - Lyrics by Jean Nohain
  - Performed by Roger Lanzac
  - Orchestrated by Guy Luypaerts
- Le Beau Pedro
  - Music by Henri Betti
  - Lyrics by Jean Nohain
  - Performed by Armand Mestral
  - Orchestrated by Guy Luypaerts

== Production ==
The composer of the music of the film Henri Betti plays his own role. During a scene, there is an orchestra that plays the melody of the songs C'est si bon and Mais qu’est-ce que j’ai ? (1947).

The song Le Beau Pedro was used in the film His Father's Portrait directed by André Berthomieu the same year.
