= Raymond Pech =

French composer

Raymond Jean Pech (4 February 1876 in Valenciennes – 3 July 1952 in Paris) was a French composer.

== Biography ==
Pech studied at the conservatoire of Lille then the Conservatoire de Paris where he was a pupil of Raoul Pugno, Xavier Leroux and Charles Lenepveu.

He participated three times at the Prix de Rome, where he was second prize with the cantata Alyssa in 1903, and first prize with the cantata Medora in 1904, on a text by Édouard Adenis.

He stayed at the Villa Medici in Rome in 1904 which he left in order to marry in 1905.

With Lazare-Lévy, he was the professor of composer of pianist Henri Betti.

Pech composed songs, a string quartet and other pieces of chamber music, church music works, including a mass, and the music educational work 80 leçons d’harmonie.
