= Pascal Sevran =

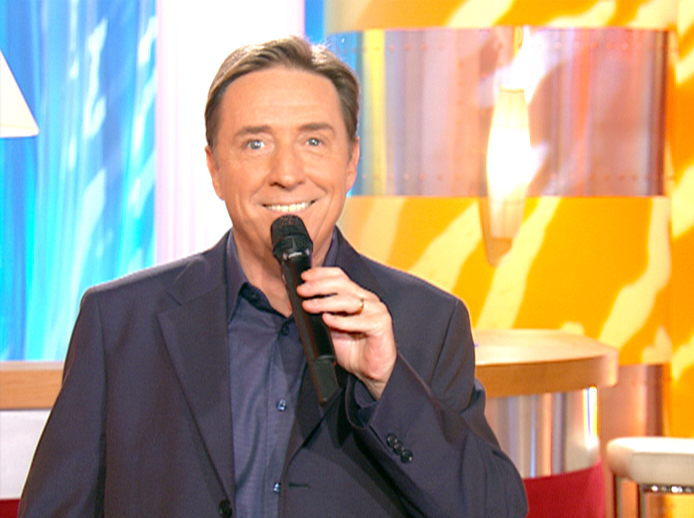
- In 2003

Background information
- Born: Jean-Claude Jouhaud; 16 October 1945; Paris, France
- Died: 9 May 2008 (aged 62) Limoges, France
- Genres: Chanson
- Occupations: Singer; TV shows Songwriter; Book Writer
- Instrument: Vocals
- Years active: 1979–2007

Pascal Sevran (16 October 1945 – 9 May 2008) was a French TV presenter and author.

== Biography ==
Son of a communist taxi driver, and a Spanish seamstress, Pascal Sevran was born on 16 October 1945 in Paris. His real name was Jean-Claude Jouhaud. He worked as a songwriter, a singer, a TV presenter, and an author. He was openly gay. He was involved in a racist controversy when he blamed the "black penis" for famine in Africa. He died on 9 May 2008 in Limoges.

== Bibliography ==
=== As Book Author ===
- 1979 : Le Passé Supplémentaire
- 1980 : Vichy Dancing
- 1982 : Un garçon de France
- 1995 : Tous les bonheurs sont provisoires
- 1998 : Mitterrand, les autres jours about his friendship with François Mitterrand
- 2006 : Journal (personal diary)

=== As songwriter ===
He wrote many songs, including :

- Il venait d'avoir 18 ans
- Comme disait Mistinguett
- C'est à Brasilia (music : Henri Betti)

=== As TV show presenter ===
- from 1984 to 1991 : La chance aux chansons (chance to songs) on TF1 channel, then from 1991 to 2000 on France 2 channel.
- Chanter la vie Sing the life
- Entrée d'Artiste, his last TV show, stopped in 2007

=== As an actor ===
- 1991 : Les secrets professionnels du Dr Apfelglück
