= Pierre-Louis (actor) =

French actor and film director

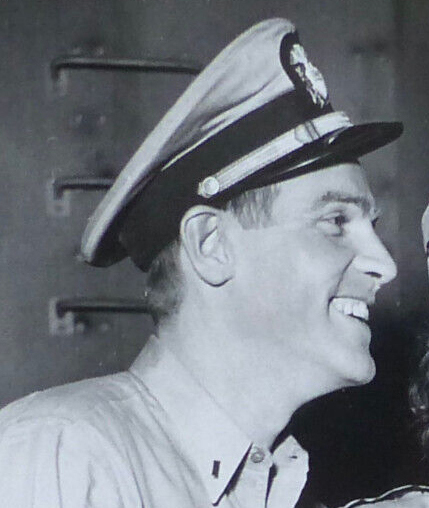
- Pierre-Louis in 1950
- Born: 14 June 1917; Le Mans, Sarthe, France
- Died: 11 January 1987 (aged 69); Massy, Essonne, France
- Other name: Pierre Amourdedieu
- Occupations: Actor, Director
- Years active: 1931-1977 (film)

Pierre-Louis (1917–1987) was a French film actor. He also directed three films in the early 1950s including The Nude Dancer.

== Selected filmography ==
=== Actor ===
- At the End of the World (1934)
- Madame Angot's Daughter (1935)
- Beautiful Days (1935)
- Hélène (1936)
- The Two Schemers (1938)
- The Mysteries of Paris (1943)
- Box of Dreams (1945)
- Counter Investigation (1947)
- The Shadow (1948)
- The Eleven O'Clock Woman (1948)
- The Firemen's Ball (1948)
- Quay of Grenelle (1950)
- Voyage for Three (1950)
- Sins of Madeleine (1951)
- Nightclub (1951)
- Sweet Madness (1951)
- Moumou (1951)
- Fortuné de Marseille (1952)
- His Father's Portrait (1953)
- Tourbillon (1953)
- Burning Fuse (1957)
- Anyone Can Kill Me (1957)
- Maigret Sets a Trap (1958)
- The Second Twin (1966)

=== Director ===
- The Nude Dancer (1952)
- Soyez les bienvenus (1953)
- Mandat d'amener (1953)

== Bibliography ==
- Goble, Alan. The Complete Index to Literary Sources in Film. Walter de Gruyter, 1999.
