= Les Djinns (choir) =

French choir

Les Djinns were a French choir with a distinctive singing style, composed of sixty girls between the ages of nine and eighteen years, conducted by Paul Bonneau. In 1959, the French government organized a 'Master School' for the instruction of girls in musical subjects in order to ensure a supply of performance talent for the country's radio and television industry. The Master School set a course of study where the girls followed a curriculum of standard academic subjects in the morning hours, then musical courses in the afternoons consisting of scales, vocal techniques, harmony and choral vocalizing. Upon graduation, each girl was accepted into Les Djinns.

Within six weeks of the group's founding, Les Djinns were awarded the Grand Prix of the Academy of Records in France, and their popularity began to proliferate with stage appearances in France and tours in other European countries. Eventually, a total of 88 tunes were recorded, including a Christmas album and an album of American favorites sung in French, and released on the ABC-Paramount label. One Les Djinns single recording, "Marie Marie" (1960), made it onto the Top 100 list.

Les Djinns never toured the United States, but two separate filmed sequences were shown within two separate Sunday-evening Ed Sullivan variety shows.

== Les Gam's ==
Several of Les Djinn Singers graduates continued on with separate recording careers. In September 1962, Les Djinn' lead soloist Annie Markan and three other members of the group – Graziella, Michèle and Suzie – formed the vocal quartet Les Gam's. (The name was derived from the first letter of each girl's name plus the added apostrophe to add a fashionable touch.)

Les Gam's issued one disc on the Vogue label, then signed with Mercury Records for subsequent releases, their repertoire consisting almost exclusively of covers of American songs, and they enjoyed some success. Accompaniment was sometimes provided by the Les Lionceaux group.

The Les Gam's disbanded after September, 1964 following the release of "Une petite larme m’a trahie", their take on Burl Ives' "A Little Bitty Tear" on which Annie was given top billing, with credits reading "Les Gam’s with Annie Markan".

Markan issued her first solo Extended Play album in 1965, leading with "Quand mon ami pleure", a version of the little-known "When My Baby Cries", penned by Lesley Duncan with French lyrics written specially for Annie by Hubert Wayaffe, presenter of Europe 1’s "Dans le vent" program.

No mention of Les Gam's was made on the record's sleeve and the musical style was in marked contrast to her earlier material, but Markan returned to more familiar fare for her follow-ups. Les Gam's had enjoyed their biggest hit with "Il a le truc", a version of the Exciters’ "He’s Got the Power", so the US group's back catalogue was adapted again for Annie.

When US singer Len Barry scored a hit in France with "1-2-3", Mercury released Markan's "Un, deux, trois" on Extended Play along Markan's version of Martha and the Vandellas’ "Nowhere to Run", retitled "Mon obsession me poursuit".

Markan's final EP was released in 1966 without much success, and she was quietly dropped by the label. She is understood to have gone on to work in public relations.

== Les Fizz ==
This vocal trio made of ex-Djinns Singers (Danielle Licari, Jackie Castan and Nadine Doukhan) and backed by Jacques Denjean's orchestra, existed from 1965 to 1967 and released three EP.
