= The Road to Paradise (1956 film) =

- Directed by: Willi Forst; Hans Wolff
- Written by: André Tabet; Gustav Kampendonk
- Produced by: Kurt Ulrich
- Starring: Georges Guétary; Christine Carère; Claude Farell
- Cinematography: Willi Sohm
- Edited by: Hermann Leitner
- Music by: Werner R. Heymann
- Production companies: Berolina Film; Comptoir d'Expansion Cinématographique
- Release date: 9 May 1956
- Countries: France; West Germany
- Language: French

The Road to Paradise (French: Le chemin du paradis) is a 1956 French-German romantic comedy film directed by Willi Forst and Hans Wolff and starring Georges Guétary, Christine Carère and Claude Farell. The film is the French version of the 1955 German film The Three from the Filling Station, which was itself a remake of an identically named 1930 film.

== Cast ==
- Georges Guétary as Pierre
- Christine Carère
- Claude Farell
- Jacques Jouanneau as Robert
- Yves Furet as Fred
- Willy Fritsch
- Friedl Hardt
- Hilde Hildebrand
- Carl Hinrichs
- Fritz Imhoff
- Hans Moser as Un automobiliste
- Wolfgang Neuss
- Rolf Olsen
- Wulf Rittscher
- Oscar Sabo
- Hans Schwarz Jr.
- Oskar Sima
- Rudolf Vogel
- Alexa von Porembsky

== See also ==
- The Road to Paradise (1930)

== Bibliography ==
- Bergfelder, Tim & Bock, Hans-Michael. The Concise Cinegraph: Encyclopedia of German. Berghahn Books, 2009.
