= Maître Pierre =

Uncompleted project by Charles Gounod

- Unfinished opera by Charles Gounod
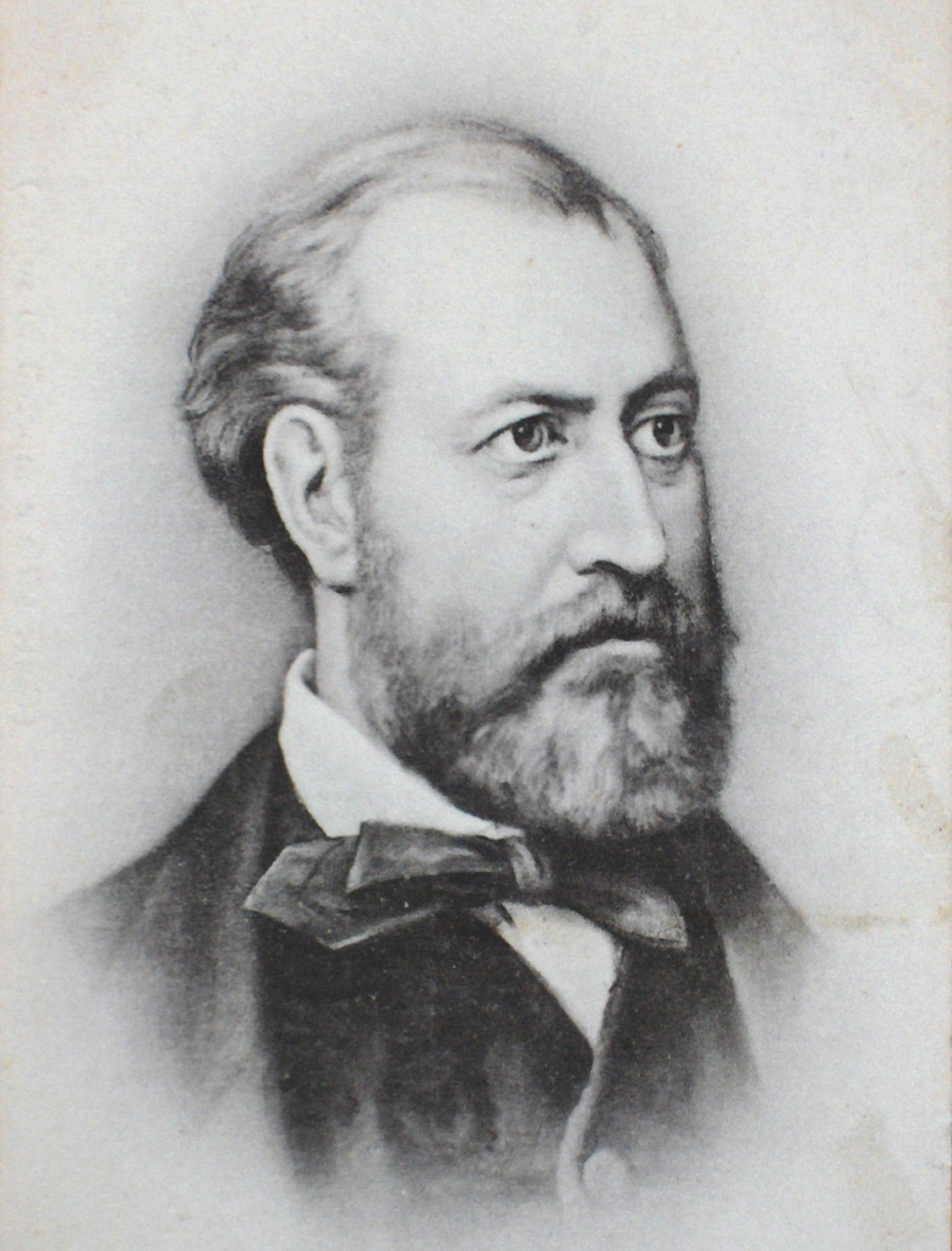
- The composer, who planned his twelfth opera in 1877
- Librettist: Louis Gallet
- Language: French
- Based on: life of Pierre Abélard (Master Pierre)

Maître Pierre (Master Pierre) is an uncompleted project by Charles Gounod, intended as his twelfth opera and planned in the summer of 1877 with the librettist Louis Gallet. The "Master Pierre" of the title was Pierre Abélard, the twelfth century scholar-philosopher and lover of Heloise.

The project's progress is documented in five letters by Gounod to Paul Poirson, the scenarist for Cinq-Mars, and in an 1878 interview with the critic Eduard Hanslick. The question of how Abelard's castration would be handled was a subject of ribald speculation in the press; when Hanslick pressed it Gounod explained that he was murdered at the end of the fourth act, his ghost visiting Héloïse in the last act.

Although the opera was half orchestrated by summer of 1878, Gounod abandoned the work to begin Le tribut de Zamora. The music was later arranged by the composer as a Suite dramatique en quatre parties; the full score is preserved in the Bibliothèque nationale. In 1904 Gounod's widow asked Camille Saint-Saëns to complete the fifth act. He supplied recitatives to connect the existing numbers, and in 1939 Reynaldo Hahn conducted a concert performance of the final tableau: "du grand Gounod" was one judgment.
