= Armand Mestral =

French actor and singer

- Born: 25 November 1917; Paris, France
- Died: 17 September 2000 (aged 82); Paris, France
- Occupation: Actor
- Years active: 1945-1992

Armand Mestral (born Armand Serge Zelikson; 25 November 1917 - 17 September 2000) was a French actor and singer. He appeared in more than seventy films from 1945 to 1992.

== Filmography ==
Year	Title	Role	Notes
1945	L'extravagante mission	Un émigrant	
1953	Soyez les bienvenus	Armand Mestral	
1954	Tabor	Lieutenant Blancard	
1954	La rafle est pour ce soir	Robert Bertoli - dit 'Bébert le Balafré'	
1954	Dangerous Turning	Daniel Courtois	
1955	Napoléon	Le maréchal Nicolas Oudinot	
1955	Pas de coup dur pour Johnny	Robert Lanier	
1956	Gervaise	Auguste Lantier	
1957	The Strange Mr. Steve		
1957	Paris clandestin	Lucky	
1958	La Fille de feu	Ortiz	
1958	Non sono più Guaglione	Francese	
1959	Un mundo para mí	Jean	
1959	The Lovers of Tomorrow	Louis	
1959	The Enigma of the Folies-Bergere	Armand - le chauffeur	
1960	Amour, autocar et boîtes de nuit	Pierre	
1960	Morgan, the Pirate	Francois L'Olonnais	
1961	Vive Henri IV, vive l'amour	Bassompierre	
1961	White Slave Ship	John Rackham	
1961	Le Tracassin	Clairac	
1962	Duel of Fire	Rocco Gravina	
1962	The Reluctant Saint		
1962	Mandrin	Sigismond de Moret	
1963	La casta Susana	Barón des Aubrais	
1963	Chair de poule	Le curé / Corenne	
1964	Encounter in Salzburg	Dr. Neubert	
1966	That Riviera Touch	Inspector Duval	
1966	Lost Command	Administration Officer	
1966	The Sea Pirate	Capitaine Hans Fell	
1966	Il grande colpo di Surcouf	Capitaine Hans Fell	
1967	The Viscount	Claude Peroux	
1968	La Bande à Bonnot	Jouin	
1968	They Came to Rob Las Vegas		
1969	My Uncle Benjamin	Machecourt	
1972	The Day the Clown Cried	Circus Director	
1973	The Hostage Gang	Le commissaire Crenoy	
1973	Two Men in Town	Le directeur de la prison de Pontoise	
1974	Un capitán de quince años	Harris	
1976	Jarosław Dąbrowski	Louis Antoine Ranvier	
1976	Deux imbéciles heureux	Le député	
1982	Le Grand Pardon	Freddy Ambrosi	
1982	Les Misérables	L'avocat général	
1989	Suivez cet avion	L'éclésiastique	
1992	Les Mamies	Archibald	
1992	Le Grand Pardon II	Freddy Ambrosi	(final film role)
