= Fernand Gignac =

Canadian actor

Fernand Gignac (March 23, 1934 – August 18, 2006) was a French Canadian singer and actor.

Beside his music career under the label Fleur-de-Lis, Gignac also starred in several television series (including Symphorien, 1968).

Gignac died on Friday, August 18, 2006, at the Hôpital Saint-Luc, Montreal, of complications due to hepatitis, aged 72.
