= A Girl on the Road =

1952 film

- Directed by: Jean Stelli
- Written by: Jean-Pierre Feydeau; Françoise Giroud
- Produced by: Roger Ribadeau-Dumas
- Starring: Georges Guétary; Lenore Aubert; Liliane Bert
- Cinematography: Marc Fossard
- Edited by: Raymond Louveau
- Music by: René Sylviano
- Production companies: Société Française de Cinématographie; La Société des Films Sirius
- Distributed by: La Société des Films Sirius
- Release date: 28 March 1952
- Running time: 85 minutes
- Country: France
- Language: French

A Girl on the Road (French: Une fille sur la route) is a 1952 French comedy film directed by Jean Stelli and starring Georges Guétary, Lenore Aubert and Liliane Bert. It was shot at the Victorine Studios in Nice and on location around the French Riviera including Cannes and Saint-Jean-Cap-Ferrat. The film's sets were designed by the art director Paul-Louis Boutié.

== Synopsis ==
A famous singer is fed up with stardom and his over-demanding female admirers. He decides to escape it all by driving off in his car. On the way he picks up a hitchhiker who, to his delight, has never heard of him.

== Cast ==
- Georges Guétary as Carlo Cortez / Jacques Gary
- Lenore Aubert as Princesse Véra
- Liliane Bert as Annabel
- Robert Pizani as Michel de Romeuil
- Lucien Callamand as Le valet
- Robert Seller as Joseph, le valet
- Les Bluebell Girls as Themselves
- Jean Lefebvre as Loulou – le pianiste
- Claude Beauclair
- Colette Fossard
- Jacques Muller
- Jean Pignol
- Pierre Sonnier
- Frédéric Valmain
- Claudine Vibert

== Bibliography ==
- Bessy, Maurice & Chirat, Raymond. Histoire du cinéma français: 1951–1955. Pygmalion, 1989.
- Rège, Philippe. Encyclopedia of French Film Directors, Volume 1. Scarecrow Press, 2009.
