= Rina Ketty =

Italian singer (1911–1996)

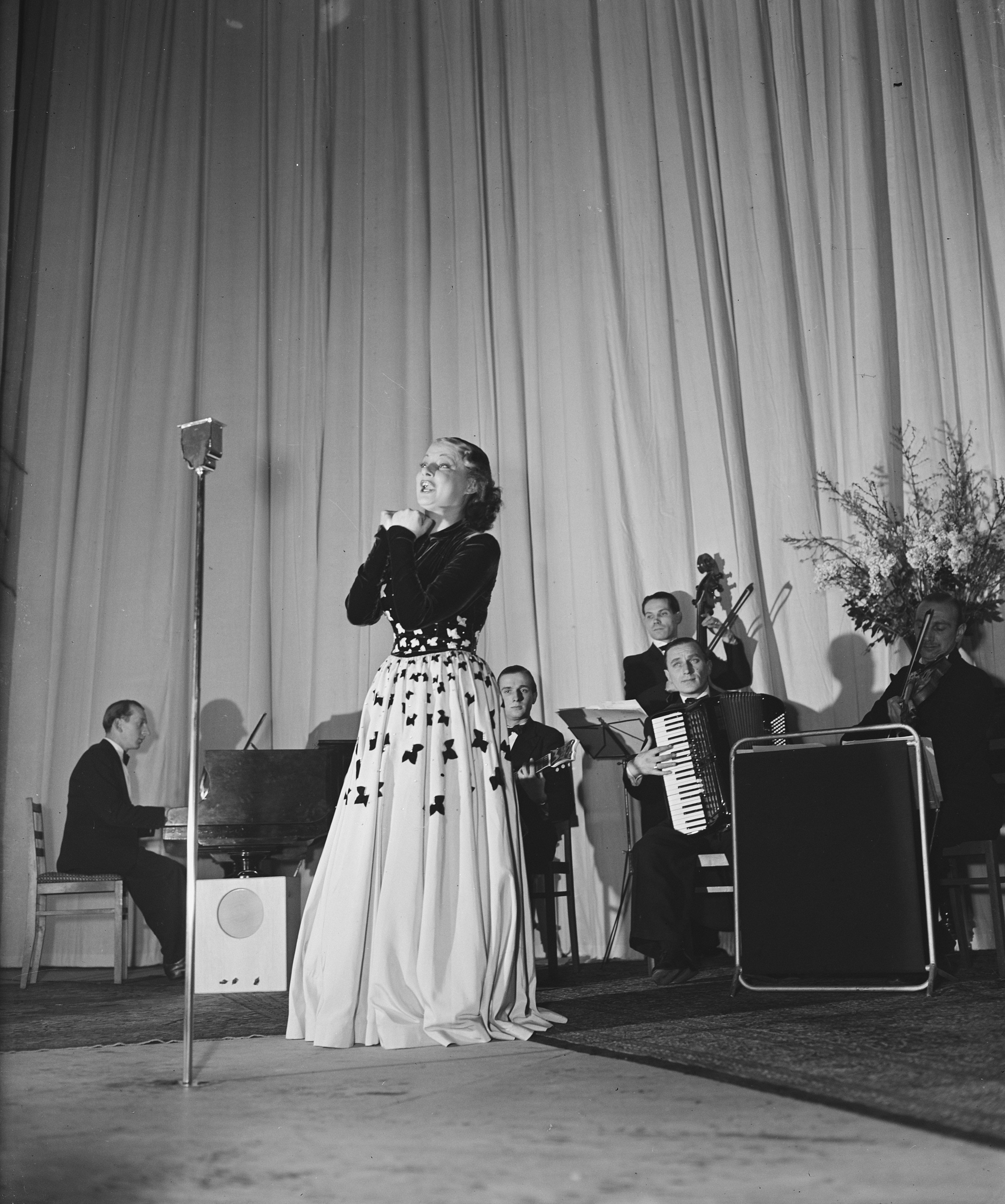
- Rina Ketty (Amsterdam, 1946)

Background information
- Born: Cesarina Picchetto; 1 March 1911; Sarzana, Liguria, Italy
- Died: 23 December 1996 (aged 85) Cannes, France
- Occupation: Singer
- Instrument: Vocals

Rina Ketty (1 March 1911 – 23 December 1996), whose real name was Cesarina Picchetto, was an Italian singer. She is best known for singing the legendary song "J'attendrai," which became a huge hit during World War II and was appreciated by Allied soldiers and Axis soldiers alike (equalled only by Lale Andersen's "Lili Marleen" and, perhaps, by Vera Lynn's "We'll Meet Again").

== Early life ==
Often thought to have been born in Turin, Cesarina Picchetto was actually born in Sarzana, a small village in Liguria, on 1 March 1911. In the 1930s, she went to Paris to meet up with her aunts, where she became enthralled by the artist communities of Montmartre.

== Career ==
Ketty began singing in 1934 in the Lapin Agile cabaret with songs by Paul Delmet, Gaston Couté, Théodore Botrel, and Yvette Guilbert. In 1936, she recorded her first songs (on the French Pathé Records label): "La Madone aux fleurs", "Près de Naples la jolie" and "Si tu reviens". None of these songs achieved wide acclaim.

Things changed for the better in 1938, when Ketty recorded the songs "Rien que mon coeur" — the French version of an Italian success song — and "Prière à la Madone." "Rien que mon coeur" won the acclaimed Grand Prix du Disque. Her name as a singer became well established with the song "Sombreros et mantilles," the text of which had been written by Chanty and the music by Jean Vaissade.

Also in 1938, Ketty recorded "J'attendrai" ("I will wait"), a translation of the Italian song "Tornerai" (music by Dino Olivieri and text by Nino Rastelli). The song had been a huge hit for Carlo Buti in Italy the year before. The text of the song, written in French by Louis Poterat, expresses the longing of many women anxiously awaiting the safe return of their sons and husbands from war. When released by Pathé Records, Ketty's version of "J'attendrai" was immediately an enormous success, and later became an emblem of World War II.

Several composers wrote songs for Ketty with her charming Italian accent in mind, including Paul Mirsaki (with his "Rendez-moi mon coeur," which was actually a reprise of "Sombreros et mantilles," but this time the text remained much closer to the Spanish original) and Jean Tranchant (with "Pourvu qu'on chante").

In 1939, Ketty ventured into classical music with the song "Mon coeur soupire," an adaptation of "Voi Che sapete" from Wolfgang Amadeus Mozart's The Marriage of Figaro.

Following the Nazi Occupation of France, Ketty – due to her Italian upbringing – wanted to be viewed in public as little as possible during the conflict; she performed on stage only in Switzerland. Upon the Liberation of France, she started out again, this time with a concert in the Alhambra-Maurice Chevalier theatre of Paris followed by a 5-month tour through the whole of France. However, she was unable to regain her pre-war fame.

Ketty was often described as an exotic and sentimental singer; in this genre she was overtaken by Gloria Lasso, who later in turn was overtaken by Dalida (who even recorded a disco version of "J'attendrai").

Ketty's repertoire was now enlarged with new songs such as "Sérénade argentine" (1948), "La Samba tarentelle," and "La Roulotte des gitans" (both 1950). She moved to Canada in 1954, and lived there some twelve years. In 1965, she again tried to achieve success with a tour through France, but to no avail.

Ketty performed her final concert in March 1996. She died in the Broussailles hospital of Cannes on 23 December 1996, aged 85.

== Personal life ==
In 1938, Ketty married accordion player Jean Vaissade, who wrote the music to "Sombreros et mantilles." They divorced in 1940. Her second marriage was to Jo Harman, and together they started a restaurant in Cannes.

== Legacy ==
More than 75 years after its creation, the song of "J'attendrai" still brings fame to its performer, mostly for its appearance in Das Boot, a now legendary German film directed by Wolfgang Petersen.

== Discography ==
- 1938 – Sombreros et mantilles
- 1938 – J'attendrai
- 1948 – Sérénade Argentine
- 1950 – La Roulotte des gitans

== Bibliography ==
- Brunschwig, C.; Calvet, L.J & Klein, J. C. (1996): Cent ans des chanson française, 1880–1980. Éditions du Seuil, Paris (ISBN 978-2-020-28140-9, 978-2-020-6000-4 and 978-2-020-02915-5, OCLC 319774045) (http://worldcat.org/oclc/319774045&lang=fr))
- Lucini, G. (2014): Luci, lucciole e canzoni sotto il cielo di Parigi – Storie di chanteuses nella Francia del primo Novecento. Segni e Parole, Novara, 160 p. (ISBN 978-88-908494-4-2)
