= Jean Nohain =

French playwright, lyricist, producer and screenwriter

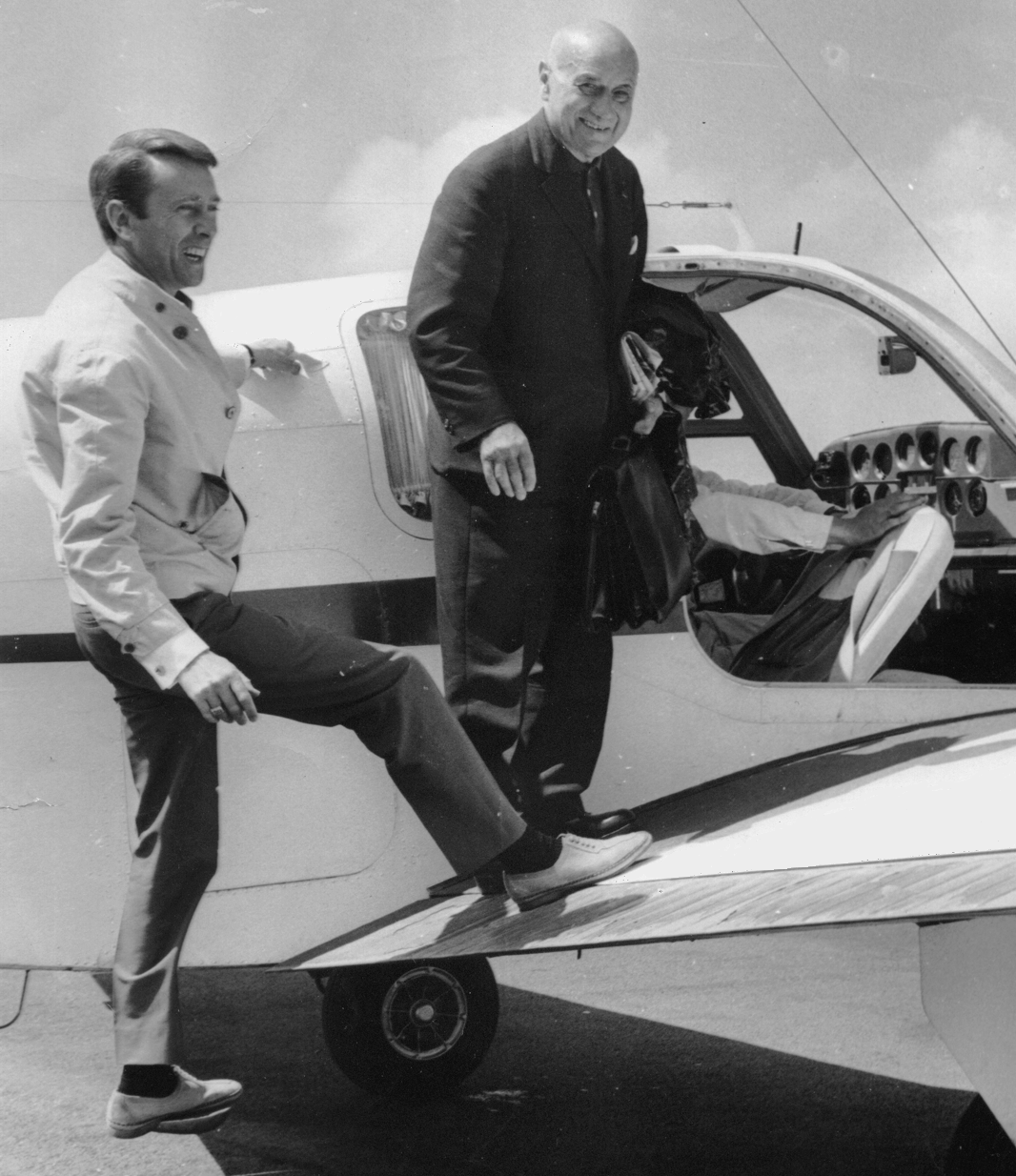
- Nohain (right) with Gilbert Richard in 1969.
- Born: Jean Marie Pierre Legrand; 16 February 1900; Paris, France
- Died: 25 January 1981 (aged 80); Paris, France
- Occupation: Composer
- Father: Franc-Nohain

Jean Nohain nicknamed Jaboune (né Jean Marie Pierre Legrand; 16 February 1900 - 25 January 1981) was a French playwright, lyricist, and screenwriter, and a radio and television producer and presenter.

== Personal Information ==
He was the son of the librettist Franc-Nohain and the brother of the actor Claude Dauphin. He is a great-uncle of Griffin Newman, James Newman and Romilly Newman.

== Selected filmography ==
- Arsene Lupin, Detective (1937)
- The Tale of the Fox (1937)
- A Foolish Maiden (1938)
- Whirlwind of Paris (1939)
- Sing Anyway (1940)
- Radio Surprises (1940)
- Soyez les bienvenus (1953)

== Bibliography ==
- Dayna Oscherwitz & MaryEllen Higgins. The A to Z of French Cinema. Scarecrow Press, 2009.
