= Paul Bonneau =

French conductor and composer (1918–1995)

- Born: Paul Alfred Bonneau; 14 September 1918; Moret-sur-Loing, France
- Died: 8 July 1995 (aged 76); Conflans-Sainte-Honorine, France
- Education: Conservatoire de Paris
- Occupations: Composer; Conductor
- Years active: 1944–1982

Paul Bonneau (14 September 1918 – 8 July 1995) was a French conductor, composer and arranger, whose career was mainly in the field of light music and films.

== Career ==
Born in Moret-sur-Loing in 1918, Paul Bonneau studied music at the Conservatoire National Supérieur de Paris in the same class as Maurice Baquet, Henri Betti, Henri Dutilleux and Louiguy. He won the premier prix d'harmonie (1937) in the class of Jean Gallon, the premier prix de fugue (1942) in the class of Noël Gallon and the premier prix de composition (1945) in the class of Henri Büsser.

In 1939, he was Army deputy chief of music and in 1945 was made director of music for the Republican Guard. He then became conductor of light orchestral music on national radio, a position he held for thirty years. His first radio broadcast was on 27 November 1944. Bonneau wrote the score for Roland Petit's ballet Guernica, premiered in 1945.

Over 30 years Paul Bonneau led 638 light music recording sessions, corresponding to more than 1,500 concerts broadcast on the national radio stations. In 1960, with the agreement of the RTF, he founded the vocal group Les Djinns who played and recorded 88 songs.

Bonneau worked as a composer or as co-composer to 51 French films, and many short films too. His other compositions include: a Suite pour orchestre, Concerto pour saxophone et orchestre, Suite pour saxophone et piano, Les Saisons for baritone and orchestra, Carillon de Westminster, symphonic poem, Tantum Ergo for tenor, choir and organ, Ouverture pour un Drame, Un Français à New York and a Rhapsody for piano and orchestra. He was also the composer of light orchestral music suites, many pieces for orchestra; he set to music ten fables of Jean de La Fontaine, and composed many light melodies and songs. He also wrote a large number of orchestral arrangements and vocal accompaniments for varieties.

In operetta, he was the musical arranger and composer of ballets at the Théâtre du Châtelet. He also adapted the songs of Jacques Offenbach for the operetta Offenbach's Folies Parisiennes (1976). In collaboration with Jack Ledru, he was the composer of La Parisienne created in Tours February 19, 1982. Bonneau made arrangements of many operettas, including Le Chanteur de Mexico (1951), La Toison d'Or and A la Jamaïque (1954), Méditerranée (1955), Rose de Noël and Le Secret de Marco-Polo (1959), Le Prince de Madrid (1967), L'Auberge du Cheval-Blanc (1968), Gipsy (1971), Les Trois Mousquetaires (1974) and Volga (1976).

== Personal life ==
Paul Bonneau married the French pianist Jacqueline Robin on 22 January 1940 in Évreux. The couple had one child, and divorced in 1959.

== Discography ==
- Audran - La mascotte (potpurri), with the Grand Orchestre de la Radio-Télé-Luxembourg (Anacrouse)
- Chabrier - España, Joyeuse Marche - Bourrée fantasque - Suite Pastorale, with the Orchestra of the Théâtre des Champs-Élysées (World Record Club)
- Dutilleux – Le Loup (ballet music), with the Orchestra of the Théâtre des Champs-Élysées (Ducretet-Thomson)
- Hahn - Ciboulette (abridged – 16 numbers), with Andrée Grandjean, Willy Clément, Michel Hamel, Françoise Ogéas, Choeurs and Orchestra of the Théâtre des Champs-Élysées (1955, Ducretet-Thomson)
- Ketèlbey - In a Persian Market & In a Monastery Garden, with Choeurs and orchestra of the Théâtre des Champs-Élysées (1958, Ducretet-Thomson - Telefunken)
- Messager - Isoline (ballet) and Les Deux Pigeons (suite from the ballet), with the orchestra of the Théâtre des Champs-Élysées (1954, Ducretet-Thomson)
- Offenbach – fantasies on La Périchole and La Grande-Duchesse de Gérolstein, with the orchestra of the Théâtre des Champs-Élysées (1957, EMI)
- Van Parys & Parès - Le Moulin Sans-Souci, with Janine Micheau, Liliane Berton, Colette Herent, Michel Dens, the Choeur René Duclos and Colonne Orchestra (1958, EMI)
- He conducted the New Symphony Orchestra of London, with Gérard Souzay, in a recital of excerpts from operas by Rameau (Les Indes galantes), Berlioz (La Damnation de Faust), Gounod (Faust, Philémon et Baucis and Roméo et Juliette), Bizet (La Jolie fille de Perth and Les Pêcheurs de perles), Chabrier (Le Roi malgré lui), Massenet (Le Jongleur de Notre-Dame) and Offenbach (Les Contes d’Hoffmann) - Decca, 1956 Kingsway Hall London

== Filmography ==
- 1949 : Le Silence de la mer (conductor of the Colonne orchestra)
- 1950 : Les Enfants Terribles (conductor)
- 1951 : The Prettiest Sin in the World (composer)
- 1953 : La Loterie du bonheur (composer)
- 1953 : Moineaux de Paris (composer)
- 1956 : Pity for the Vamps (composer)
- 1957 : L'Auberge en folie (co-composer)
- 1957 : Adorables Démons (composer)
- 1958 : En légitime défense (composer)
- 1958 : La Fille de feu (composer)
- 1959 : Deux hommes dans Manhattan (conductor)
- 1959 : Visa pour l'enfer (composer)
- 1961 : Napoléon II, l'aiglon (co-composer)
