= Yvette Giraud =

French singer

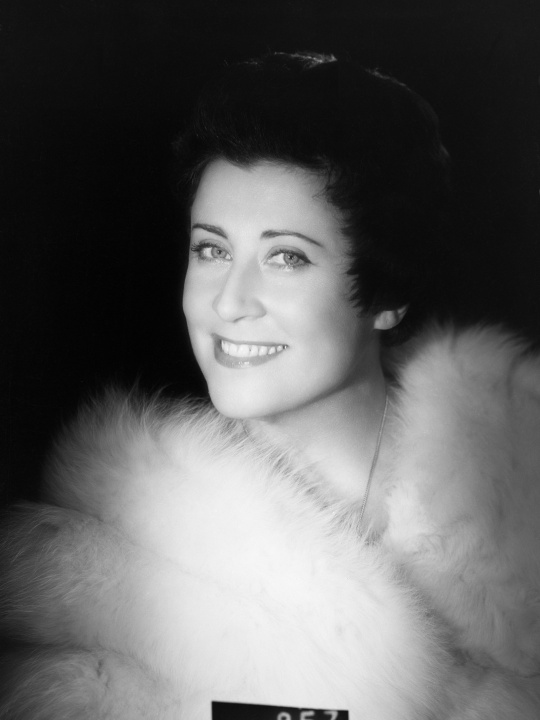
- Yvette Giraud (1955)

Background information
- Born: 16 September 1916; Paris, France
- Died: 3 August 2014 (aged 97)
- Genres: Traditional pop
- Occupation: Singer

Yvette Giraud (16 September 1916 – 3 August 2014) was a French traditional pop singer.

== Career ==
Giraud began singing in 1946 with "Mademoiselle Hortensia", or La Danseuse est Créole. With her husband, former Compagnon de la Chanson Marc Herrand, she wrote an autobiographical book in 2005, published by Editions du Signe in Strasbourg, about how she became internationally famous. Giraud was well known in Japan, where she sang for a long time, responding to the audience expectations since her first visit in 1955. She died in August 2014 at the age of 97.

=== Awards and accolades ===
On 14 February 1995 Giraud was awarded the Order of the Precious Wisteria Crown by the Emperor of Japan. She later received the Commandeur des Arts et des Lettres distinction from the French Minister of Culture.

=== Publications ===
- Herrand, Marc; Giraud, Yvette (2005). La route enchantée [The Enchanted Road]. Strasbourg: Éditions du Seuil. ISBN 978-2-746-81584-1.

== See also ==
- List of French singers
- List of members of the Ordre des Arts et des Lettres
