= Georges Guétary =

French singer and actor (1915 – 1997)

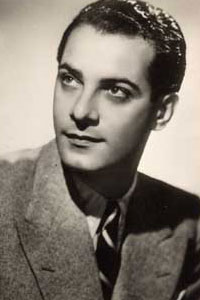
- Georges Guétary
- Born: Yorgos Lambros; 8 February 1915; Alexandria, Egypt
- Died: 13 September 1997 (aged 82); Mougins (Alpes-Maritimes), France
- Spouse: Janine Guyon (m. 1955)

Georges Guétary (French pronunciation: [ʒɔʁʒ ɡetaʁi]), born Yorgos Lambros (Greek: Γιώργος Λάμπρος Yorgos Lambros ['yorgos ˈlambros]; 8 February 1915 – 13 September 1997) was a French singer, dancer, cabaret performer and film actor, best known for his role in the 1951 musical An American in Paris.

== Early life and career ==
Guétary was born in Alexandria, Egypt, to Greek parents. His father was a textile executive from Leros. His mother, whose surname was Vourlou, was from Samos. Her surname led to confusion with some mistakenly saying that the boy's name was Lambros Vourlow. (It is probable that he used that as a stage name at some point, before adopting "Guétary").. He studied music in Egypt and in Paris, and made his stage debut in 1937. He performed as a singer and dancer with the famed chanteuse Mistinguett at the Casino de Paris.

The British newspaper The Independent said at the time of his death that "part of Guétary's exotic charm, and much of his stage persona as a 'Latin lover' with a voice of creme Chantilly resided in his mischievous innocence combined with an erotic mystery inherent in his ancestry."

His first film appearance was in the musical Quand le cœur chante (1938). He also appeared many times at the Théâtre du Châtelet and in numerous other French motion picture and TV films.

He changed his name to Guétary during World War II to forestall scrutiny from officials who were deporting foreigners to concentration camps. Guétary became a French citizen in 1950.

After the war, Guétary appeared on stage in London and New York. He received critical praise for his performance in London opposite Lizbeth Webb in the 1947 operetta Bless the Bride, which ran for nearly a thousand performances.

On 5 January 1949 Georges Guétary recorded the first version of the song Maître Pierre. This song composed by Henri Betti with the lyrics by Jacques Plante would be a great success performed by many singers and accordionists.

On Broadway, Guétary appeared in Arms and the Girl with Nanette Fabray in 1950. He received a Tony Award for Best Foreign Performer.

== An American in Paris and afterwards ==
Guétary was best known in the United States for his role as Henri Baurel in An American in Paris, in which he plays a friend, and unknowing romantic rival, of the American painter Jerry Mulligan, played by Gene Kelly. In the film, Guétary plays a cabaret performer and family friend who is in love with a young woman he sheltered when she was a child in Paris during World War II, Lisa Bouvier, played by Leslie Caron. She is engaged to the Guétary character but meets and falls in love with Mulligan.

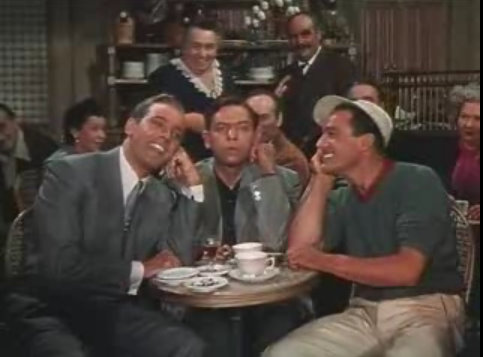
Guétary (left) and Kelly agree that "'s wonderful" to be in love. A pensive Oscar Levant is not so sure.

Kelly was nearly three years older than Guétary, and the role was originally intended for the much older Maurice Chevalier, who turned down the part. Kelly's biographer, Clive Hirschhorn, said that Kelly recruited Guétary for the part even though he knew that Guétary was too young. In its review, however, Variety said that Guétary was "cast neatly as the older man."

In the film, Guétary is noted for a solo number in which he strides up a stairway singing George Gershwin's Stairway to Paradise. He also appeared with Kelly in a rendition of Gershwin's 'S Wonderful in which both sing, without the other knowing it, about their love for Caron. At the end of the film, the object of their affection, Caron, chooses to go with Kelly despite her affection for Guétary.

Guétary's role in American in Paris turned out to be his only appearance in a Hollywood film. He returned to the stage and films in France. In 1958, he appeared on Broadway in the musical Portofino. New York Times critic Brooks Atkinson said he was "the kissingest philanderer the season has produced."

Guétary was married to Janine Guyon, a producer in French television. They had two children.

== Filmography ==
Year	Title	Role	Notes
1936	Rigolboche		
1938	Quand le coeur chante		
1940	Monsieur Hector	Danseur tyrolien	Uncredited
1942	The Lost Woman	Le chanteur à la fête	
1943	L'inévitable M. Dubois		Voice, Uncredited
1945	The Black Cavalier	le seigneur Ramon de Ortila	
1946	Trente et quarante	Le comte Mario de Miranda	
1947	The Adventures of Casanova	Le chevalier Giacomo Casanova de Seingalt	
1949	Jo la Romance	Georges Hyverlin	
1950	Amour et Compagnie	Claude Andrieux	
1951	An American in Paris	Henri Baurel	
1951	Paris Still Sings	Georges Guétary	
1952	A Girl on the Road	Carlo Cortez / Jacques Gary	
1952	Feather in the Wind	Claude Magazelle	
1953	Saluti e baci	Himself	
1953	À vos ordres Ernestine		
1954	Baron Tzigane	Sandor Barinkay	
1955	Love Is Just a Fairytale	Mario, Sänger	
1956	The Road to Paradise	Pierre	
1956	Vergiß wenn Du kannst	Singer	
1957	Une nuit aux Baléares	Miguel de Santa Floris	
1960	C'est arrivé à 36 chandelles	Himself	Uncredited
