= List of French films of 1954 =

French films released in 1954

A list of films produced in France in 1954.

== A-L ==
Title	Director	Cast	Genre	Notes
Adam Is Eve	René Gaveau	Jean Carmet, Pierre Blanchard, Thérèse Dorny	Comedy	Based on a novel by Francis Didelot
Adventures of the Barber of Seville	Ladislao Vajda	Luis Mariano, Lolita Sevilla, Danielle Godet	Comedy	Co-production with Spain
After You Duchess	Robert de Nesle	Jean Parédès, Jacqueline Pierreux, Jacques Morel	Comedy	
Ah! Les belles bacchantes	Jean Loubignac	Robert Dhéry, Louis de Funès, Colette Brosset	Comedy	
The Air of Paris	Marcel Carné	Jean Gabin, Arletty, Roland Lesaffre	Drama sport	Co-production with Italy
Ali Baba and the Forty Thieves	Jacques Becker	Fernandel, Samia Gamal, Dieter Borsche	Comedy	
April Fools' Day	Gilles Grangier	Bourvil, Annie Cordy, Louis de Funès	Comedy	
At the Order of the Czar	André Haguet	Michel Simon, Colette Marchand, Jacques François	Historical	Co-production with West Germany
The Beach	Alberto Lattuada	Martine Carol, Raf Vallone, Carlo Romano	Comedy drama	Co-production with Italy
The Beautiful Otero	Richard Pottier	María Félix, Jacques Berthier, Louis Seigner	Drama	Co-production with Italy
The Bed	Henri Decoin, Jean Delannoy, Gianni Franciolini, Ralph Habib	Jeanne Moreau, Richard Todd, Dawn Addams, Vittorio De Sica, Françoise Arnoul,	Comedy	
Before the Deluge	André Cayatte	Antoine Balpêtré	Drama	Co-production with Italy. Entered into the 1954 Cannes Film Festival
The Big Flag	Jacques Pinoteau	Jean Chevrier, Marc Cassot, Nicole Courcel	Drama	
Cadet Rousselle	André Hunebelle	François Périer, Dany Robin, Madeleine Lebeau	Adventure	
The Cheerful Squadron	Paolo Moffa	Vittorio De Sica, Alberto Sordi, Silvana Pampanini	Comedy	Co-production with Italy
College Madness	Henri Lepage	Rudy Hirigoyen, Nicole Courcel	Comedy	
The Congress of Mother-in-Laws	Émile Couzinet	Pierre Larquey, Jeanne Fusier-Gir, Georges Rollin	Comedy	
The Count of Bragelonne	Fernando Cerchio	Georges Marchal, Dawn Addams, Jacques Dumesnil	Adventure	Co-production with Italy
The Count of Monte Cristo	Robert Vernay	Jean Marais, Lia Amanda, Roger Pigaut	Historical	Co-production with Italy
The Country of the Campanelli	Jean Boyer	Sophia Loren, Carlo Dapporto, Mario Riva	Comedy	Co-production with Italy
Crainquebille	Ralph Habib	Yves Deniaud, Pierre Mondy	Comedy drama	
Crime at the Concert Mayol	Pierre Méré	Claude Godard, Jean-Pierre Kérien, Daniel Clérice	Crime	Co-production with Italy
Dames Don't Care	Bernard Borderie	Eddie Constantine, Nadia Gray, Dominique Wilms	Crime	
Dangerous Turning	Robert Bibal	Viviane Romance, Philippe Lemaire, Armand Mestral	Drama	Co-production with Italy
Death on the Run	André Berthomieu	Jean Richard, Jean-Marc Thibault	Comedy	
Fire Under Her Skin	Marcel Blistène	Gisèle Pascal, Raymond Pellegrin, Philippe Lemaire	Drama	
Flesh and the Woman	Robert Siodmak	Gina Lollobrigida, Jean-Claude Pascal, Arletty	Adventure, Drama	Co-production with Italy. Entered into the 1954 Cannes Film Festival
French Cancan	Jean Renoir	Jean Gabin, Françoise Arnoul, María Félix	Musical	Entered into the 1954 Cannes Film Festival
The Grimace Soup	Jean Sacha	Georges Marchal, Maria Mauban, Noël Roquevert, Maurice Teynac, Christiane Lénier, Grégoire Aslan, Dominique Wilms	Crime drama	
Human Cargo	Pierre Chevalier	Micheline Presle, Raymond Pellegrin	Crime	
It's the Paris Life	Alfred Rode	Claudine Dupuis, Philippe Lemaire, Raymond Bussières	Comedy	
Journey to Italy	Roberto Rossellini	Ingrid Bergman, George Sanders, Maria Mauban	Drama	Co-production with Italy
Knave of Hearts	René Clément	Gérard Philipe, Natasha Parry, Valerie Hobson	Drama	Co-production with Britain
Le Blé en herbe	Claude Autant-Lara	Edwige Feuillère, Nicole Berger, Pierre-Michel Beck	Drama	
Leguignon the Healer	Maurice Labro	Yves Deniaud, Jane Marken, Nicole Besnard	Comedy	
The Lost Girl	Jean Gourguet	Claudine Dupuis, Gérard Landry, Robert Berri	Drama	
Love in a Hot Climate	Georges Rouquier, Ricardo Muñoz Suay	Manuel Agiulera, Leandre Alpirente	Drama	Entered into the 1954 Cannes Film Festival Co-production with Spain
The Lovers of Manon Lescaut	Mario Costa	Myriam Bru, Franco Interlenghi, Roger Pigaut	Historical	Co-production with Italy

== M-Z ==
Title	Director	Cast	Genre	Notes
Madame du Barry	Christian-Jaque	Martine Carol, Daniel Ivernel, Gianna Maria Canale	Historical	Co-production with Italy
Maddalena	Augusto Genina	Märta Torén, Gino Cervi, Charles Vanel	Drama	Co-production with Italy
Mata Hari's Daughter	Carmine Gallone	Ludmilla Tchérina, Erno Crisa, Milly Vitale	Adventure	Co-production with Italy
My Seven Little Sins	Jean Boyer	Maurice Chevalier, Delia Scala, Colette Ripert	Comedy	Co-production with Italy
No Exit	Jacqueline Audry	Arletty, Gaby Sylvia, Franck Villard	Drama	
Obsession	Jean Delannoy	Michèle Morgan, Raf Vallone	Crime	
One Bullet Is Enough	Juan Lladó	Georges Ulmer, Véra Norman	Crime	Co-production with Spain
One Step to Eternity	Henri Decoin	Danielle Darrieux, Michel Auclair, Corinne Calvet	Thriller	Co-production with Italy
On Trial	Julien Duvivier	Daniel Gélin, Madeleine Robinson, Anton Walbrook	Drama	Co-production with Italy
Operation Thunder	Gérard Sandoz	Blanchette Brunoy, Jean-Pierre Kérien, Howard Vernon	Spy	
Orient Express	Carlo Ludovico Bragaglia	Silvana Pampanini, Henri Vidal, Eva Bartok	Drama	Co-production with Italy
Papa, Mama, the Maid and I	Jean-Paul Le Chanois	Robert Lamoureux, Gaby Morlay, Fernand Ledoux, Nicole Courcel	Comedy	
The Pirates of the Bois de Boulogne	Norbert Carbonnaux	Raymond Bussières, Annette Poivre, Christian Duvaleix	Comedy	
Quay of Blondes	Paul Cadéac	Michel Auclair, Barbara Laage, Madeleine Lebeau	Crime	
Queen Margot	Jean Dréville	Jeanne Moreau, Armando Francioli, Françoise Rosay	Historical	Co-production with Italy
Rasputin	Georges Combret	Pierre Brasseur, Isa Miranda, Renée Faure	Historical	Co-production with Italy
The Red and the Black	Claude Autant-Lara	Danielle Darrieux, Gérard Philipe, Antonella Lualdi	Historical	Co-production with Italy
The Roundup is for Tonight	Maurice Dekobra	Robert Burnier, Jim Gérald, Muriel Monclar, Jane Sourza, Blanchette Brunoy, Christian Fourcade, Maurice Maillot, Jacqueline Pierreux, Jeanne Fusier-Gir, Grégoire Aslan, Isabelle Eber, Chris Kersen, Jean Tissier, Henri Guisol, Roger Til, Monique Clarence, Armand Mestral, Maria Lointaine, Suzy Gossen, Jocelyne Jany, Nita Raya, Bob Ingarao, Marcel Vallée	Crime drama	
The Secret of Helene Marimon	Henri Calef	Isa Miranda, Frank Villard, Carla Del Poggio	Drama	Co-production with Italy
Service Entrance	Carlo Rim	Etchika Choureau, Danielle Darrieux, Robert Lamoureux	Comedy	
The Scheming Women	Henri Decoin	Raymond Rouleau, Jeanne Moreau, Raymond Pellegrin, Etchika Choureau	Crime	
Stain in the Snow	Luis Saslavsky	Daniel Gélin, Valentine Tessier, Marie Mansart	Crime	
Storm	Pierre Billon, Giorgio Capitani	Raf Vallone, Françoise Arnoulm Elena Varzi	Drama	Co-production with Italy
Strange Desire of Mr. Bard	Géza von Radványi	Michel Simon, Yves Deniaud	Comedy drama	
Tempest in the Flesh	Ralph Habib	Françoise Arnoul, Philippe Lemaire, Raymond Pellegrin	Drama	
Three Days of Fun in Paris	Émile Couzinet	Lucien Baroux, Armand Bernard, Pierre Larquey	Comedy	
Touchez pas au grisbi	Jacques Becker	Jean Gabin, Lino Ventura, Dora Doll	Crime	Co-production with Italy
Tourments	Jacques Daniel-Norman	Paul Azaïs, Louis de Funès	Drama	
Tout chante autour de moi	Pierre Gout	Marcel Mouloudji, Christine Carère, Pierre Mondy	Comedy drama	
The Two Orphans	Giacomo Gentilomo	Myriam Bru, Milly Vitale, André Luguet	Historica drama	Co-production with Italy
The Unfrocked One	Léo Joannon	Pierre Fresnay, Pierre Trabaud, Nicole Stéphane	Drama	Entered into the 4th Berlin International Film Festival
Vice Dolls	Raoul André	Nicole Courcel, Philippe Lemaire, Maria Mauban, Dominique Wilms	Crime	
Wild Fruit	Hervé Bromberger	Estella Blain, Nadine Basile, Roger Dumas	Drama	
Women Without Hope	Raoul André	Gisèle Pascal, Philippe Lemaire, Louise Carletti	Drama	
Yours Truly, Blake	Jean Laviron	Eddie Constantine, Danielle Godet, Colette Deréal	Comedy, Crime	
Zoé	Charles Brabant	Barbara Laage, Michel Auclair, Louis Seigner	Comedy	

== See also ==
- 1954 in France
