= Compositeurs et Chansons de Paris =

- Directed by: Henri Verneuil
- Starring: Marie-Laurence; Jacques Pills; Rose Avril; Lucienne Delyle; Maria Vincent
- Cinematography: Victor Arménise
- Release date: 1951
- Running time: 25 minutes
- Country: France
- Language: French

Compositeurs et Chansons de Paris is a French short film directed by Henri Verneuil in 1951.

== Synopsis ==
Little known to the general public for the benefit of the performers, composers present a sample of their talent through several songs.

== Songs ==
- La Vie en rose (1946)
  - Music by Louiguy
  - Lyrics by Édith Piaf
  - Performed by Marie-Laurence
- Maître Pierre (1948)
  - Music and orchestration by Henri Betti
  - Lyrics by Jacques Plante
  - Performed by Jacques Pills
- À Malaga (1951)
  - Music and orchestration by Paul Durand
  - Lyrics by Louis Poterat
  - Performed by Rose Avril
- Pour Lui (1946)
  - Music and orchestration by Aimé Barelli
  - Lyrics by Henri Contet
  - Performed by Lucienne Delyle
- Blondine (1950)
  - Music by Henri Bourtayre and Fred Freed
  - Lyrics by Louis Poterat and Maurice Chevalier
  - Performed by Jacques Pills
- La Seine (1948)
  - Music by Guy Lafarge
  - Lyrics by Guy Lafarge and Flavien Monod
  - Performed by Maria Vincent

== Production ==
When the narrator of the short film presents the various composers, he hums songs that the composers have written in their career :

- Louiguy :
  - Mademoiselle Hortensia (lyrics by Jacques Plante)
  - La Danseuse est Créole (lyrics by Jacques Plante)
  - Ça sent si bon la France (lyrics by Jacques Larue)
  - Ceriser Rose et Pommier Blanc (lyrics by Jacques Larue)
- Henri Betti :
  - La Chanson du maçon (lyrics by Maurice Vandair)
  - Mais qu'est-ce que j'ai ? (lyrics by Édith Piaf)
  - C'est si bon (lyrics by André Hornez)
  - Le Régiment des mandolines (lyrics by Maurice Vandair)
- Paul Durand :
  - Printemps (lyrics by Henri Contet)
  - Mademoiselle de Paris (lyrics by Henri Contet)
  - Seul ce soir (lyrics by Jean Casanova and Rose Noël)
  - Boléro (lyrics by Henri Contet)
- Aimé Barelli :
  - Embrasse-moi (lyrics by Jacques Larue)
  - Si tu Viens Danser dans mon Village (lyrics by Henri Contet)
- Henri Bourtayre :
  - Fleur de Paris (lyrics by Maurice Vandair)
  - La Marchina (lyrics by Louis Poterat)

== Anecdotes ==
Henri Betti and Louiguy made their musical studies at the Conservatoire de Paris in the same class.

Rose Avril and Lucienne Delyle recorded on disc the songs they sing in this short film unlike Marie-Laurence, Jacques Pills and Maria Vincent.
