= Jack Ary =

French actor (1919–1974)

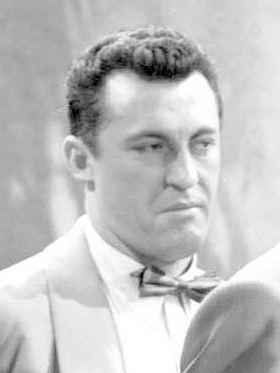
- Born: 23 November 1919; Haute-Vienne, Limousin, France
- Died: 23 September 1974 (aged 54); Paris, France
- Occupation: Actor
- Years active: 1951–1974 (film & TV)

Jack Ary (23 November 1919 – 23 September 1974) was a French film and television actor.

== Selected filmography ==
- My Wife Is Formidable (1951) - Un pensionnaire de l'hôtel (uncredited)
- Massacre in Lace (1952) - Un danseur (uncredited)
- Monsieur Leguignon Lampiste (1952) - Un habitant du quartier (uncredited)
- Allô... je t'aime (1952)
- The Respectful Prostitute (1952) - Un routier (uncredited)
- La danseuse nue (1952)
- Crazy for Love (1952) - Un journaliste (uncredited)
- A Hundred Francs a Second (1952) - Un cheminot en grève (uncredited)
- Le dernier Robin des Bois (1952) - (uncredited)
- Le témoin de minuit (1953)
- The Long Teeth (1953) - Le chauffeur de M. Wamter (uncredited)
- Wonderful Mentality (1953) - Un gendarme
- Le gang des pianos à bretelles (1953)
- Au diable la vertu (1953) - Le gendarme de garde
- The Tour of the Grand Dukes (1953) - Un homme au 'Balajo' (uncredited)
- La môme vert-de-gris (1953) - Un homme de Rudy
- Une vie de garçon (1953) - Le garçon de café
- The Most Wanted Man (1953) - (uncredited)
- Women of Paris (1953) - Le cow-boy (uncredited)
- The Women Couldn't Care Less (1954) - Casa Antica's Waiter (uncredited)
- C'est la vie parisienne (1954) - L'agent (uncredited)
- The Pirates of the Bois de Boulogne (1954) - L'agent de police
- Death on the Run (1954) - Un agent
- Cadet Rousselle (1954) - Un hallebardier (uncredited)
- Yours Truly, Blake (1954) - L'inspecteur Brevan
- The Infiltrator (1955) - Un inspecteur
- The Impossible Mr. Pipelet (1955) - Un pompier
- Je suis un sentimental (1955) - Le barman (uncredited)
- La Madelon (1955) - Un blessé qui assiste au gala (uncredited)
- Mémoires d'un flic (1956) - Un inspecteur
- People of No Importance (1956) - Un routier
- Meeting in Paris (1956) - Le premier agent (uncredited)
- Short Head (1956) - Un inspecteur (uncredited)
- Paris Palace Hotel (1956) - Petit rôle (uncredited)
- Alerte au deuxième bureau (1956)
- La terreur des dames (1956)
- Bonjour Toubib (1957) - Le garçon de café
- Les 3 font la paire (1957) - Un gangster (uncredited)
- Sénéchal the Magnificent (1957) - Un gangster complice de Mado (uncredited)
- Love in the Afternoon (1957) - Love on Right Bank (uncredited)
- The Inspector Likes a Fight (1957) - Un gangster
- La roue (1957)
- Mademoiselle and Her Gang (1957) - Émile l'Africain - le troisième truand
- Nous autres à Champignol (1957) - Un sportif de Champignol
- À pied, à cheval et en voiture (1957) - (uncredited)
- Les Espions (1957) - Le serveur du wagon-restaurant (uncredited)
- Mademoiselle Strip-tease (1957) - Brutus
- Sinners of Paris (1958) - (uncredited)
- Secrets of a French Nurse (1958) - Nino
- Le temps des oeufs durs (1958) - Le vendeur d'oreillers
- A Certain Monsieur Jo (1958) - Charlot
- Gigi (1958) - Waiter at "Palais de Glace" (uncredited)
- School for Coquettes (1958)
- Me and the Colonel (1958) - German Sergeant (uncredited)
- La môme aux boutons (1958) - Le photographe
- Le Sicilien (1958) - (uncredited)
- Suivez-moi jeune homme (1958) - (uncredited)
- Les motards (1959) - Un motard
- The Indestructible (1959)
- La valse du gorille (1959) - (uncredited)
- The Gendarme of Champignol (1959) - Le droguiste
- La bête à l'affût (1959) - Un inspecteur
- Arrêtez le massacre (1959)
- Préméditation (1960)
- Bouche cousue (1960)
- Recours en grâce (1960) - Georges
- Fanny (1961) - Sailor (uncredited)
- Dynamite Jack (1961) - John (uncredited)
- Tales of Paris (1962) - Pidoux (segment "Ella")
- Le Crime ne paie pas (1962) - Un inspecteur (segment "L'homme de l'avenue") (uncredited)
- Gigot (1962) - Blade
- Jusqu'au bout du monde (1963)
- People in Luck (1963) - Un policier (segment "Le gros lot") (uncredited)
- The Sucker (1965) - Le douanier-chef
- Furia a Marrakech (1966)
- Flashman (1967) - Inspector Baxter
- Le permis de conduire (1974)
- Eugène Sue (1974, TV Movie) - Maréchal Soult
- Pourquoi? (1977) - (final film role)

== Bibliography ==
- Philippe Arnaud. Sacha Guitry, cinéaste. Editions du Festival international du film de Locarno, 1993.
