= Lucienne Delyle =

French singer (1913–1962)

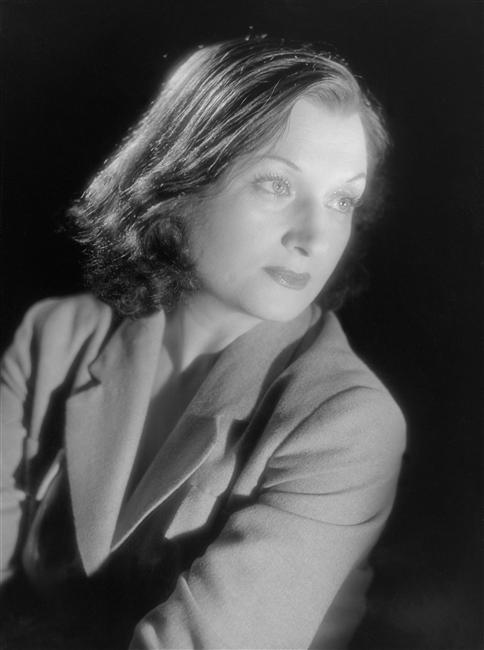
Lucienne Delyle, 1948

Lucienne Delyle (16 April 1913 – 10 April 1962) was a French singer.

After the success of Mon amant de Saint-Jean (my lover from Saint-Jean), in 1942, Lucienne Delyle became one of the most popular French female singers of the 1950s.

== Biography ==
Born in Paris, she received a pharmacist's education. She performed as an amateur singer until 1939 when Jacques Canetti, the artistic director of Radio Cité, heard her and immediately engaged her. In 1940, she married the jazzman Aimé Barelli (1917–1995), who guided her career for the rest of her life. They had a daughter, Minouche Barelli (1947–2004). She had an immense success with the song "Mon amant de Saint-Jean" (My Lover From Saint-Jean) in 1942, and became the most popular female singer in France. She achieved her greatest popularity during the 1950s. In 1953, Bruno Coquatrix invited her and Gilbert Bécaud to headline the gala opening concert at the Paris Olympia. Toward the end of the 1950s she suffered from leukemia and her career declined rapidly. In 1960 she gave a final series of concerts on the stage of the Bobino music hall. She died in Monte Carlo in 1962.

== Selected Discography ==
1939

- Sur les quais du vieux Paris, lyrics from Louis Poterat and music from Ralph Erwin
- Elle fréquentait la rue Pigalle (lyrics from Raymond Asso – music from Maitrier)
- Prière à Zumba (music from A. Lara – lyrics from Jacques Larue)
- Dans mon cœur, mélodie hongroise du film Retour à l'aube (music from Paul Misraki – lyrics from André Hornez)

1940

- L'orgue chantait toujours (music from Zeppelli – lyrics from Louis Poterat)
- La Java du bonheur du monde (music from Marguerite Monnot – lyrics from Raymond Asso)
- Valse de minuit (music from Lara – lyrics from Louis Poterat)
- C'est drôle (music from Lawrence – lyrics from Louis Poterat)
- Je crois aux navires (music from Marguerite Monnot – lyrics from Jacques Larue)

1941

- Le Paradis perdu (Hans May – R. Ferney) [B.O.F.]
- Sixième étage (Guy Van Parys – Veber)
- Le reste est sans importance (music from Alex Siniavine – lyrics from Jacques Larue)
- Y'a pas de refrain (music from Marguerite Monnot – lyrics from Maurice Vandair)
- Viens demain (music from Louiguy – lyrics from Jacques Larue)
- Fumée (Jal – Bataille-Henry)

1942

- Mon amant de Saint-Jean (E. Carrara – L. Agel)
- Refrain sauvage (Francis Lopez – François Llenas – Pierre Hiégel)
- Nuages, lyrics from Jacque Larue and music from Django Reinhardt
- J'ai tout gardé pour toi (Johnny Hess)
- La Valse blonde (Nadyval – François)
- Tu m'oublieras (Sentis – Vaysse – Lagarde)
- Un toit qui penche (music from Lutèce – lyrics from Jacques Larue)

1943

- Marie des anges (music from Francis Lopez – lyrics from Jacques Larue)
- Des mensonges (Kreuder – Sauvat)
- J'ai chanté sur ma peine (Jacques Météhen – Pierre Hiégel)

1944

- Malgré tes serments (Henri de Christiné – Howard)
- Domingo (Louis Gasté – Bérard – Louis Gasté)
- Gitanella (music from Verdu – lyrics from Jacques Larue)
- L'Hôtel en face (music from Marguerite Monnot – lyrics from Money)

1946

- Embrasse-moi, chéri (music from Aimé Barelli – lyrics from Jacques Larue)
- Pour lui, lyrics from Henri Contet and music from Aimé Barelli
- Printemps (music from Paul Durand – lyrics from Henri Contet)
- Valser dans l'ombre (music from Charles Dumont – lyrics from Louis Poterat)

1947

- Les Quais de la Seine, lyrics from Jean Dréjac, music from Jean Dréjac and André Lodge
- Un ange comme ça, lyrics from Daniel Hortis and music from Guy Magenta

1948

- Bolero (music from Paul Durand – lyrics from Henri Contet)

1949

- C'est un gars (Pierre Roche – Charles Aznavour)

1950

- Sous les ponts de Paris (music from Vincent Scotto – lyrics from Jean Rodor) also sung by Léon Noël (inside CD album of Vincent Scotto 1922–1947 – 2 cd and a brieflet).
- Telle que je suis (Christian Jollet – R. Desbois)
- J'ai rêvé de vous, inspired from Sleepy Lagoon (Eric Coates – Louis Hennevé)

1951

- Le Monsieur aux lilas (music from Aimé Barelli – music from Henri Contet)
- José le caravanier

1952

- Charmaine (Rapée – Pollack /ad. ?? (inspired from Der lachende Ehemann d'Edmund Eysler, 1913 based on the "Hungarian danse no 11" from Johannes Brahms Valse en La Majeur, opus 39, "Poco Andante", 1880)
- C’est mon gigolo (L. Casucci – André Mauprey)
- Si toi aussi tu m’abandonnes, French adaptation from Henri Contet and from Max François of song High Noon (Do not forsake me) in the movie Le train sifflera trois fois, music from Dimitri Tiomkin
- Ça marche (duo with Aimé Barelli)

1953

- Jambalaya (Hank Williams / adaptation from Fernand Bonifay)
- Quel temps fait-il à Paris ?
- Domino (Louis Ferrari – Jacques Plante)
- Judas (G. Fanciulli – lyrics from Fernand Bonifay)
- Prenez mon cœur et mes roses (T. Evans – Reaves – adaptation from Fernand Bonifay) of Lady of Spain

1954

- Kaïla
- Mon petit copain perdu, lyrics and music from Nicole Louvier
- I love Paris (music from Cole Porter – lyrics from Jacques Larue) [for the opérette Can-Can]
- Mon cœur est un violon, for the movie Le Petit garçon perdu (Miarka Laparcerie – J. Richepin)

1955

- Gelsomina (Pauvre enfant perdue) for movie La Strada (music from Nino Rota – lyrics from Robert Chabrier)
- Un ange comme ça (music from Guy Magenta – lyrics from Daniel Hortis)
- Gelsomina and Luna Rossa in Japanese

1956

- Ça t'va bien
- Java, lyrics from Eddy Marnay and music from Emil Stern, arrangements from Mario Bua
- Toi c’est vrai
- Hop digui-di, adaptation from Fernand Bonifay of song Hop Diggity (Dog Ziggity Boom) from A. Hoffman and D. Manning
- Mon cœur se balade (M. Fontenay)
- Pour un dollar, lyrics from Fernand Bonifay and music from Guy Magenta, arrangements from Mario Bua
- Amour, castagnettes et tango, adaptation from F. Llenas of ong Hernando's Hideaway from Richard Adler and Jerry Ross
- Mais le trompette..., lyrics from Jacques Larue, music from Aimé Barelli and Philippe-Gérard
- La Rose tatouée, lyrics from Henri Contet and music from Harry Warren for movie La Rose tatouée (Rose Tattoo), arrangements from Mario Bua
- Sur ma vie, lyrics and music from Charles Aznavour
- Arrivederci Roma, lyrics from Fernand Bonifay and Roland Berthier on music from Renato Rascel, arrangements from Mario Bua

1957

- Mimi la rose (lyrics from Robert Chabrier – music from Aimé Barelli, arr. Mario Bua)
- Tu n’as pas très bon caractère (music from Albano / lyrics from Fernand Bonifay) [Scapricciatiello]
- Anastasia (music from Alfred Newman / lyrics from Pierre Delanoë) [du film Anastasia]
- Accarezzame (music from Pino Calvi / paroles d'Eddy Marnay)
- Paname (lyrics from Robert Chabrier – music from Jo Moutet)
- Piano, piano (lyrics from Jacques Larue – music from C. A. Morelli)
- Ma p'tite polka (paroles d'Eddy Marnay – music from Emil Stern)
- J'ai le béguin (lyrics from Robert Chabrier – music from Aimé Barelli)

1958

- C’est ça la musique (Chanté aussi par Henri Salvador
- Merci Paris (lyrics from Robert Chabrier – music from Aimé Barelli, arr. Mario Bua)
- Merci (S. Seracini / P. Havet – lyrics from Pierre Delanoë) (L'edera, Sanremo Music Festival 1958, 2nd prize)
- Tu m' vas (M. Aldebert)
- Come prima (Tu me donnes) (Taccani – Di Paola / lyrics from Jacques Larue) – chanté aussi par Henri Salvador
- Dans le bleu du ciel bleu (music from Domenico Modugno / lyrics from Jacques Larue) [Nel blu, dipinto di blu, Sanremo Music Festival 1958, 1st prize]

1959

- On n'a pas tous les jours vingt ans (F. Pothier – Léo Raiter) chanté aussi par Berthe Sylva
- Les Roses blanches (C. L. Pothier – Léon Raiter) aussi chanté par Berthe Sylva
- Le Dénicheur (E. Gilbert – Louis Agel – L. Donodeff)
- Le Grand frisé (E. Ronn – L. Donideff) Aussi chanté par Damia
- Vous seul (H. Lemarchand – D. Mauprey)
- Le tango nous invite (music from André Verchuren – Favereau)
- Le Marchand de bonheur (André Calvet – Jean Broussolle)

1960

- De ton cœur à mon cœur (lyrics from René Bravard – music from Claude Mansard)
- Les Amants du dimanche (paroles d'Henri Contet – music from Marguerite Monnot)
- Rue de Siam (lyrics from Jacques Larue – music from Guy Magenta)
- Les Bleuets d'azur (lyrics from Jacques Larue – music from Guy Magenta)
- Pour lui (nouvelle version)
- La Chapelle au clair de lune (Henri Varna – Léo Lelièvre / B. Hill)
- Les Amants du dimanche (paroles d'Henri Contet – music from Marguerite Monnot)
- Fleur de souris (paroles d'Henri Contet – music from André Lutereau)
- Bistrot (J. Eigel – A. Dutrieux – Henri Segers)
- Écoute ma rengaine (lyrics from René Bravard – music from Armand Canfora)
- Ma gigolette (music from Jean Constantin – J. Guigo – Alexander Alstone – James Kennedy)
- Embrasse-moi (lyrics from Jacques Larue – music from Aimé Barelli)
- J'attendrai (lyrics from Louis Poterat – music from D. Olivieri)
- Mon ange (lyrics from J. Féline – music from Bruno Coquatrix)
- Il ne faut pas briser un rêve (J. Jal)
- Sur les quais du vieux Paris (nouvelle version)

Directions and orchestras: 1939–1960: Marcel Cariven, Raymond Legrand, Jacques Météhen, Aimé Barelli, Armand Migiani, Paul Mauriat.
