= Jacques Emmanuel =

French actor, screenwriter and librettist

Jacques Emmanuel, real name Jacques Emmanuel Welfling, (13 January 1920 in Paris – 11 June 1998 in Saint-Cloud aged 78) was a French actor, screenwriter and librettist.

== Filmography ==
=== Script ===
- 1953: Deux de l'escadrille by Maurice Labro
- 1955: Casse-cou, mademoiselle by Christian Stengel
- 1956: Le Pays d'où je viens by Marcel Carné
- 1956: It Happened in Aden by Michel Boisrond
- 1957: Les Collégiennes by André Hunebelle
- 1957: Nathalie by Christian-Jaque
- 1957: La Parisienne by Michel Boisrond
- 1958: The Law Is the Law by Christian-Jaque
- 1958: Croquemitoufle by Claude Barma
- 1959: Babette Goes to War by Christian-Jaque
- 1961: Dynamite Jack by Jean Bastia
- 1962: La Vendetta by Jean Chérasse
- 1963: People in Luck by Jack Pinoteau, Philippe de Broca and Jean Girault
- 1964: Les Durs à cuire by Jack Pinoteau
- 1965: The Man from Cocody by Christian-jaque
- 1965: When the Pheasants Pass by Édouard Molinaro
- 1966: Trois enfants dans le désordre by Léo Joannon
- 1966: Les malabars sont au parfum by Guy Lefranc
- 1968: Les Gros Malins by Raymond Leboursier
- 1977: Parisian Life by Christian-Jaque
- 1990: Dames galantes

=== Actor ===
- 1943: Lucrèce
- 1946: Patrie by Louis Daquin
- 1946: Lessons in Conduct by Gilles Grangier
- 1948: Les Aventures des Pieds-Nickelés by Marcel Aboulker
- 1948: Métier de fous by André Hunebelle
- 1949: Branquignol by Robert Dhéry
- 1949: The Patron by Robert Dhéry
- 1951: Monsieur Fabre by Henri Diamant-Berger
- 1951: No Vacation for Mr. Mayor by Maurice Labro
- 1952: Monsieur Leguignon, Signalman buy Maurice Labro
- 1952: Allô... je t'aime by André Berthomieu
- 1953: Deux de l'escadrille by Maurice Labro
- 1954: Mourez, nous ferons le reste by Christian Stengel
- 1956: Don Juan by John Berry
- 1990: Dames galantes by Jean-Charles Tacchella

== Opera ==
- 1962: L'Opéra d'Aran by Gilbert Bécaud, with Pierre Delanoé and Louis Amade
