= No Vacation for Mr. Mayor =

1951 film

- Directed by: Maurice Labro
- Written by: Christian Duvaleix; Jacques Emmanuel
- Starring: Grégoire Aslan; Louis de Funès
- Cinematography: Jean Lehérissey
- Music by: Henri Contet; Paul Durand
- Production company: Latino Consortium Cinéma
- Release date: 4 November 1951
- Running time: 87 minutes
- Country: France
- Language: French

No Vacation for Mr. Mayor (original title "Pas de vacances pour Monsieur le Maire") is a French comedy film from 1951, directed by Maurice Labro, written by Christian Duvaleix, starring Grégoire Aslan and Louis de Funès.

== Cast ==
- André Claveau: Philippe Lebon, the singer
- Grégoire Aslan: Mr Beaudubec
- Albert Duvaleix: the mayor
- Jacques Emmanuel: Adolphe
- Fernande Montel: Maharanée
- Sylvie Pelayo: Annie
- Fred Pasquali: Tracassin
- Noël Roquevert: Uncle Joachim
- Louis de Funès: the adviser
- Jo Charrier: the photographer
- Emmanuel Cheval: the concierge
