= Padam, padam... =

1951 song by Édith Piaf

Song by Edith Piaf
- Language: French
- Written: 1942–1951
- Released: 1951
- Genre: Waltz
- Length: 3:17
- Composer: Norbert Glanzberg
- Lyricist: Henri Contet

"Padam, padam..." is a song originally released in 1951 by the French singer and lyricist Édith Piaf. The melody of the song was originally composed in 1942 by Norbert Glanzberg, and lyrics were later added by Henri Contet. The lyrics tell the story of a woman's evocative memories of an alluring melody, an allusion to a past lover.

The song uses a 3/4 waltz feel to create a "maddeningly catchy" effect. The person singing the song experiences a nostalgic, wistful music-related memory. She describes how a certain evocative, memorable melody evokes in her memories of a former lover, hence the onomatopoeia of "padam, padam..." of one's heartbeat.

A version introduced under the title I still love you all (Marie Michele Nanette) T-070.266.391-9, by lyricist Don Raye Video on YouTube.

== Track listings ==
7-inch EP EMI Columbia ESRF 1023 (1954, France)

1. "Padam padam..." (3:17)
2. "Jézébel" (3:07)
3. "Mariage" (4:16)
4. "Les amants de Venise" (3:10)

== Cover versions ==
The song was covered, among others, by Tony Martin, Mireille Mathieu, Michael Heltau, Chimène Badi, Patricia Kaas, and Ann Christy. Another cover in 1988 was sung together by members of Italian bands Litfiba, Violet Eves, and Moda.

In 2023, Yeong Taek Seo, a member of Forténa covered the song.
