= List of Japanese films of 1954 =

A list of films released in Japan in 1954 (see 1954 in film).

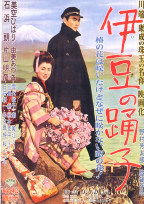
Izu no Odoriko

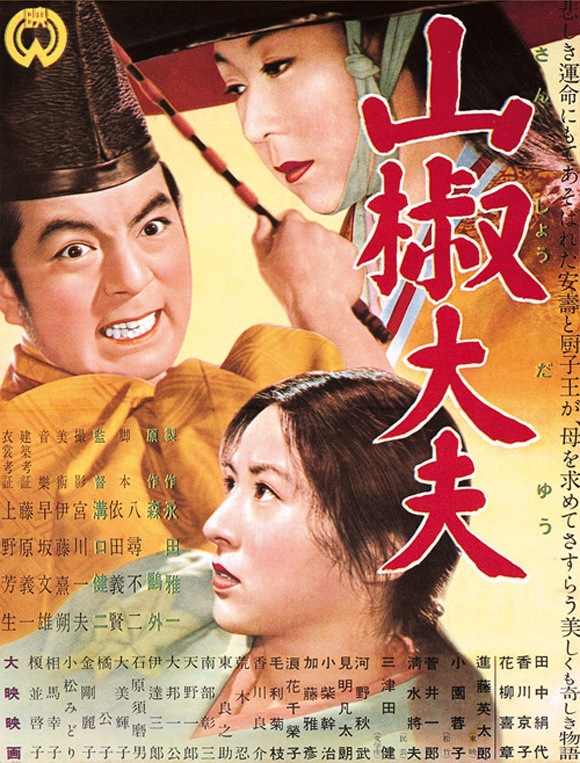
Sansho the Bailiff

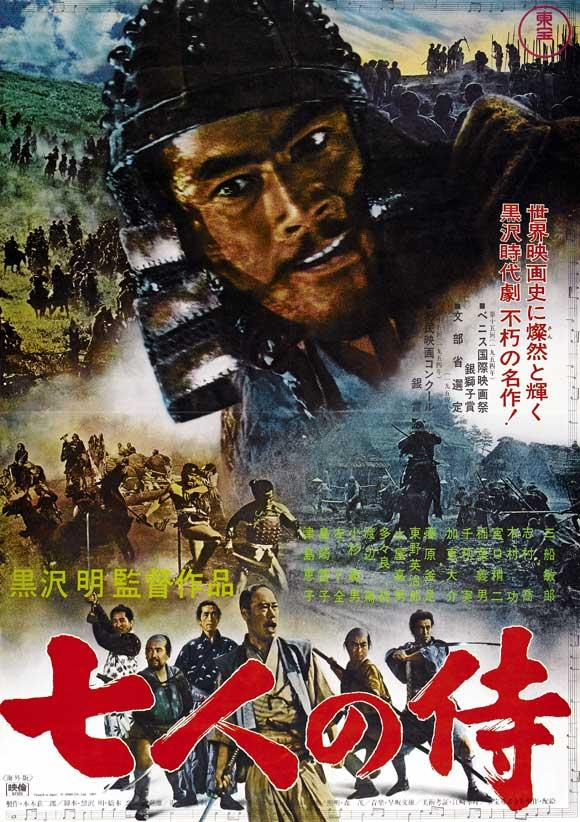
Seven Samurai

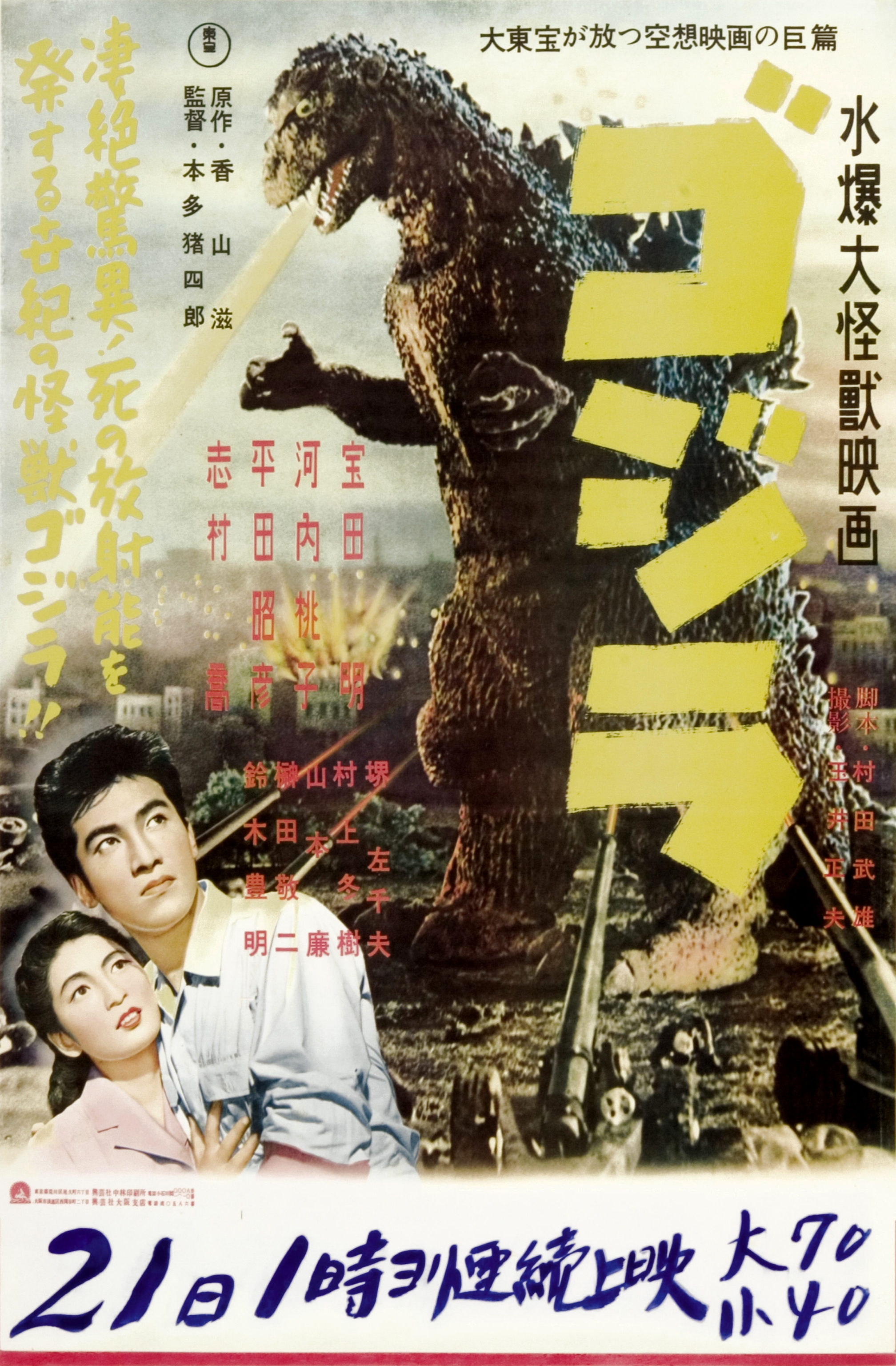
Godzilla

== List of films ==
Japanese films released in 1954
Title	Director	Cast	Genre	Notes
All of Myself	Kon Ichikawa	Ryō Ikebe, Ineko Arima, Kinuko Ito	—	
The Crucified Lovers	Kenji Mizoguchi	Kazuo Hasegawa, Kyōko Kagawa, Yoko Minamida	—	
Izu no Odoriko	Yoshitaro Nomura	Hibari Misora, Akira IShihama	Romance	
Ghost Man	Motoyoshi Oda	Seizaburo Kawatsu, Miki Sanjo	Science fiction	
Godzilla	Ishirō Honda	Takashi Shimura, Momoko Kochi, Akira Takarada	Science fiction	
Late Chrysanthemums	Mikio Naruse	Haruko Sugimura	Drama	
Onna no koyomi	Seiji Hisamatsu	Yoko Sugi, Kyōko Kagawa	Drama	Entered into the 1955 Cannes Film Festival
The Garden of Women	Keisuke Kinoshita	Hideko Takamine, Yoshiko Kuga	Drama	
Miyamoto Musashi	Hiroshi Inagaki	Toshirō Mifune, Rentarō Mikuni	Samurai film	
Sansho the Bailiff	Kenji Mizoguchi	Kinuyo Tanaka	Drama	
Seven Samurai	Akira Kurosawa	Toshirō Mifune	Samurai film	
Sound of the Mountain	Mikio Naruse	Setsuko Hara, So Yamamura	Drama	
Twenty-four Eyes	Keisuke Kinoshita	Hideko Takamine	Drama	Won Best Film at the 5th Blue Ribbon Awards and at the 9th Mainichi Film Awards
The Invisible Avenger	Motoyoshi Oda	Yoshio Tsuchiya	Mystery	

== See also ==
- 1954 in Japan
