= Herod the Great (film) =

- Directed by: Victor Tourjansky
- Screenplay by: Damiano Damiani; Tullio Pinelli; Fernando Cerchio; Victor Tourjansky
- Story by: Damiano Damiani; Tullio Pinelli
- Produced by: Robert de Nesle; Alberta Dionisi; Federico Galliani; Victor Tourjansky; Bruno Turchetto; Giorgio Venturini
- Starring: Edmund Purdom; Sylvia Lopez
- Cinematography: Massimo Dallamano
- Edited by: Antonietta Zita
- Music by: Carlo Savina
- Production companies: Vic Film; Faro Film; Explorer Film '58; Comptoir Français de Productions Cinématographiques
- Distributed by: Euro International Films
- Release dates: 1 January 1959 (Italy); 21 August 1959 (France)
- Running time: 93 minutes
- Countries: Italy; France
- Language: Italian

Herod the Great (Italian: Erode il grande, French: Le roi cruel) is a 1959 Italian-French epic historical drama film directed by Victor Tourjansky.

== Plot ==
Two men who criticized King Herod of Judea are crucified, which generates hate against the unpopular monarch. His lieutenant Aaron returns with the remains of the Judean army with news that Mark Antony and Cleopatra have died following their defeat by Octavian. On the losing side and dealing with riots, Herod considers ending his life but is convinced not to by his wife, Miriam. Aaron reunites with his own wife, Sarah.

Herod tells his court that he will go to Rhodes and present himself to Octavian. When he fails to obtain the advice of Sameas, a respected interpreter of the law, and is unsatisfied by predictions of danger from his astrologer Nabutzar, Herod orders his high priest Ezra to hold prayers in the Temple for his safety and orders his general Taris to make sure his court stays in line while he is gone. Herod is wary that his scheming mother-in-law Alexandra will try to make her son Daniel king in his absence because they are from the old legitimate dynasty while Herod and Aaron are Idumean outsiders.

Before he leaves, Herod orders Aaron to kill Miriam if he doesn't come back, as he can't stand the thought that she would marry someone else after his death. When rumors spread that Herod has been killed, a conspiracy brews. Herod's son, Antipater, tries to join the plot to make Daniel king but is rejected due to his opportunism. Aaron is nearly killed by his friend Oreb, who betrayed him for the promise of a promotion.

Aaron kills Oreb and flees with Miriam into the wilderness. They take Herod and Miriam's infant son with them. Herod is captured and brought to Octavian, where he argues that Judea is too strange for the Romans to understand and that he can be as loyal as he was to Antony. Despite the advice of Octavian's associate Claudius Severus, who believes that Herod should die for supporting Antony, Octavian keeps him on the throne.

The Romans return to Judea to find Daniel being crowned. Herod is enraged until he finds out that they thought he was dead and rushes away to find Miriam. Claudius makes it clear to the court that Herod is King of Judea by the order of Octavian Augustus, Emperor of the Romans. When Herod reunites with Miriam, she is initially cold towards him because Aaron told her about his order for her death, but she forgives him. When Miriam praises God for saving Herod, he dismisses the idea that God had anything to do with it.

Herod holds a feast in honor of Claudius as his guest, but his suspicion towards his former friends makes the gathering tense. The festivities end early when Daniel is found dead in a pool. Alexandra accuses Herod of murdering him, and to cast suspicion away from himself, Herod orders that Daniel be buried with kingly honors. This creates a rift between Herod and Miriam when she begins to believe that Herod did murder Daniel, especially when he doesn't fully deny it.

Antipater manipulates Herod against his wife by insinuating that she is being unfaithful to him with Aaron and planting false evidence. Herod has Aaron tortured, and Antipater helps Miriam break Aaron out of prison by replacing his body in the cell with the body of Sameas, whom Herod executed sometime after the feast. Aaron and Sarah flee into the wilderness. After this, Herod gives himself entirely to Antipater's counsel, unaware that Antipater is making a play for the throne.

In the midst of all the court intrigue, Herod notices a bright star in the sky which many Judeans believe signifies the birth of the Messiah, the new king of the Jews. Herod seeks the counsel of Nabutzar, who tells him that he is favored by the stars. This temporarily reassures Herod that there will be no Messiah to steal his throne.

Once reconciliation fails, Herod orders that Miriam be tried by the Grand Sanhedrin for adultery, but tells Taris to stop the execution even at the last second if Miriam confesses. Ezra, who presides over the trial, finds her guilty despite her innocence. Alexandra takes Herod's infant son into hiding in Bethlehem, where Herod ironically sends his men to kill the infants in case the Messiah has been born there. When Aaron hears that Miriam has been found guilty, he makes his way to Jerusalem despite Sarah's pleas for him not to leave her again. But he is too late, as Herod's men have already stoned her to death; the common people refused to do it.

Upon reflection, Herod realizes that Miriam was innocent and Antipater tricked him. He suffers a mental breakdown and strangles Antipater to death before calling out for Miriam and dying of an apoplectic blow.

== Cast ==
- Edmund Purdom as Herod
- Sylvia Lopez as Miriam
- Sandra Milo as Sarah
- Elena Zareschi as Alexandra
- Alberto Lupo as Aaron
- Massimo Girotti as Octavian
- Andrea Giordana as Daniel
- Corrado Pani as Antipater
- Renato Baldini as Claudius Severus
- Camillo Pilotto as Ezra the High Priest
- Fedele Gentile as Oreb
- Olga Solbelli as Mother of the condemned
- Enrico Glori as Taret
- Carlo D'Angelo as The man who saw the Messiah's birth
- Enzo Fiermonte
- Adolfo Geri
- Nino Marchetti
- Feodor Chaliapin, Jr.
