= The Whole Town Accuses =

1956 film

- Directed by: Claude Boissol
- Written by: Claude Boissol; Georges Combret
- Produced by: Georges Combret
- Starring: Jean Marais; Etchika Choureau; Noël Roquevert
- Cinematography: Léonce-Henri Burel
- Edited by: Louis Devaivre
- Music by: Paul Durand
- Production company: Radius Productions
- Distributed by: Pathé Consortium Cinéma
- Release date: 23 May 1956
- Running time: 84 minutes
- Country: France
- Language: French
- Box office: 1,601,527 admissions (France)

The Whole Town Accuses (French: Toute la ville accuse) is a 1956 French comedy drama film directed by Claude Boissol and starring Jean Marais, Etchika Choureau and Noël Roquevert. The film was known under the working title Mille et un millions in France. It was shot at the Neuilly Studios in Paris. The film's sets were designed by the art director Robert Dumesnil.

== Cast ==
- Jean Marais as François Nérac
- Etchika Choureau as Catherine Aravitte
- Noël Roquevert as Duplantin
- François Patrice as Patrice Lourel
- Michel Etcheverry as leader of the bandits
- Georges Lannes as the mayor
- Albert Duvaleix as M. Arvette - the notary
- Claude Le Lorrain as young man
- Charles Bouillaud as Pistard
- Henri Cogan as a gangster
- Odette Barencey as Mary, the good
- Marcel Pérès as the man on the sidewalk
- Raphaël Patorni as president of the Tribunal

== Bibliography ==
- Andrew, Dudley & Gillain, Anne . A Companion to François Truffaut. John Wiley & Sons, 2013.
