= Carlo D'Angelo =

Italian actor (1919–1973)

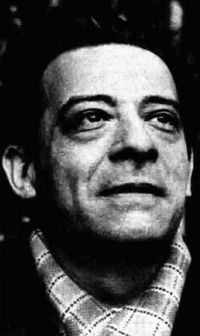
- Born: 2 February 1919; Milan, Italy
- Died: 9 June 1973 (aged 54); Bologna, Italy
- Occupations: Actor; voice actor
- Years active: 1941–1973
- Spouse: Wanda Mori (m. 1946)
- Children: 2

Carlo D'Angelo (2 February 1919 – 9 June 1973) was an Italian actor and voice actor.

== Biography ==
Born in Milan, the son of a Neapolitan father and a Florentine mother, at 9 years old D'Angelo was part of the Voci Bianche choir at La Scala. After studying law at the University of Milan, in 1941 he started working on radio and shortly later as a film dubber. In 1947 he made his stage debut at the Piccolo Teatro di Milano, under Giorgio Strehler. In the 1950s he worked several times in the theatrical company of Vittorio Gassman, and in 1958 he formed a stage company together with Lia Zoppelli and Renzo Giovampietro.

Between 1963 and 1964, he got large critical acclaim for his performance in Il diavolo e il buon Dio, under the direction of Luigi Squarzina. D'Angelo was also active in films, where alternated major and character roles, and on television, where he had several significant roles in a number of TV-series. D'Angelo was also diction teacher at the Silvio d’Amico Academy of Dramatic Arts and recorded several albums of prose and poetry.

As a voice actor, D'Angelo provided the voice of Shere Khan in the Italian dubbed version of The Jungle Book and Jesus Christ in the Italian political comedy I 2 deputati.

== Death ==
D’Angelo died at the Sant’Orsola-Malpighi Polyclinic in Bologna on 9 June 1973, at the age of 54. He had undergone stomach surgery 25 days prior to his death.

== Selected filmography ==
- La primadonna (1943)
- Uomini senza domani (1948)
- Giudicatemi! (1948)
- Ho sognato il paradiso (1950) - Magnaccia
- Fugitive in Trieste (1951)
- Lorenzaccio (1951)
- Perdonami! (1953) - Commissioner
- Pietà per chi cade (1954) - Mari's defense attorney
- Land of the Pharaohs (1955) - Nabuna, Nellifer's Bodyguard (uncredited)
- Adriana Lecouvreur (1955)
- La ladra (1955) - Il Parocco
- The Rival (1956) - Primo ufficiale inquirente
- Terrore sulla città (1957) - Professor Gallura
- I Vampiri (1957) - L'ispettore Chantal
- Dreams in a Drawer (1957) - The Substitute
- La canzone più bella (1957) - Il Supplente
- L'ultima violenza (1957) - Notaio Bartoli
- The Adventures of Nicholas Nickleby (1958, TV series) - Newman Noggs
- Herod the Great (1959) - Man who saw the Messiah's birth
- Hercules Unchained (1959) - Creonte, High Priest of Thebes
- The Great War (1959) - Capitano Ferri
- David and Goliath (1960)
- Everybody Go Home (1960) - Partigiano napoletano
- Sword of the Conqueror (1961) - Falisque
- Pigeon Shoot (1961) - Mattei
- A Day for Lionhearts (1961) - Il prete
- Queen of the Nile (1961) - Seper
- Battle of the Worlds (1961) - Gen. Varreck
- Ten Italians for One German (1962) - Obersturmbannfuhrer Herbert Kappler
- Gli eroi del doppio gioco (1962) - Riccio
- The Verona Trial (1963) - Italo Vianini
- Giulietta e Romeo (1964) - Principe di Verona
- Secret Agent Super Dragon (1966) - Fernand Lamas
- One Thousand Dollars on the Black (1966) - Judge Waldorf
- VIP my Brother Superman (1968) - Narrator (voice)
- The Great Silence (1968) - Governor of Utah
- I 2 deputati (1968) - Statue of Jesus Christ (voice)
