= 1954 in film =

The year 1954 in film involved some significant events and memorable ones. Important films released this year included Seven Samurai, On the Waterfront, and Rear Window.

== Top-grossing films ==
=== United States ===
The top ten 1954 released films by box office gross in the United States are as follows:

Highest-grossing films of 1954
Rank	Title	Distributor	Domestic rentals
1	White Christmas	Paramount	$12,000,000
2	The Caine Mutiny	Columbia	$8,700,000
3	20,000 Leagues Under the Sea	Buena Vista	$8,000,000
4	The Glenn Miller Story	Universal	$7,600,000
5	The Country Girl	Paramount	$6,500,000
6	The High and the Mighty; A Star Is Born	Warner Bros.	$6,100,000
7	Seven Brides for Seven Brothers	MGM	$5,526,000
8	Rear Window	Paramount	$5,300,000
9	Magnificent Obsession	Universal	$5,200,000
10	There's No Business Like Show Business	20th Century Fox	$5,103,555

=== International ===
International market	Film	Studio	Revenue	Admissions	Production country
France	Royal Affairs in Versailles	Cocinor	—N/a	6,986,788	France
West Germany	From Here to Eternity	Columbia Pictures	—N/a	13,000,000	United States
India	Nagin	Filmistan	$6,090,000	—N/a	India
Italy	Ulysses	Lux Film	—N/a	13,170,322	Italy
Japan	What Is Your Name? Part 3	Shochiku	¥330,150,000	—N/a	Japan
Soviet Union	Awaara	R. K. Films	$16,970,000 (Note: Awaara in the Soviet Union: Initial run – 29 million Rbls ($7.25 million) (Note: 4 Rbls per US dollar from 1950 to 1960) in 1954; Re-runs – 8.75 million Rbls (Note: 35 million re-run admissions up until 1964-1966, average Soviet ticket price of 25 kopecks in the mid-1960s) – $9.72 million (Note: 0.9 Rbl per US$ from 1961 to 1971))	100,000,000	India
Spain	Quo Vadis	Metro-Goldwyn-Mayer	—N/a	3,721,532	United States
United Kingdom	Doctor in the House	Rank Organisation	—N/a	12,200,000	United Kingdom

== Events ==
- A reproduction of "America's First Movie Studio", Thomas Edison's Black Maria, is constructed.
- May 12 — The Marx Brothers' Zeppo Marx divorces wife Marion Benda. The two were married in 1927.
- September 29 — A Star is Born premieres and marks Judy Garland's comeback after her termination from her contract at MGM. An astounding success with critics and audiences, A Star is Born not only marks the first time that legendary director George Cukor has made a film musical or a film in Technicolor and in anamorphic widescreen format, but also becomes regarded as one of Garland's best performances in her film career.
- November 3 — The film Godzilla premieres in Japan. It becomes a huge success and the first in the Godzilla film franchise, the longest running film series in history.

== Awards ==
Category/Organization	12th Golden Globe Awards February 24, 1955		27th Academy Awards March 30, 1955
Category/Organization	Drama	Comedy or Musical	27th Academy Awards March 30, 1955
Best Film	On the Waterfront	Carmen Jones	On the Waterfront
Best Director	Elia Kazan; On the Waterfront		
Best Actor	Marlon Brando; On the Waterfront	James Mason; A Star Is Born	Marlon Brando; On the Waterfront
Best Actress	Grace Kelly; The Country Girl	Judy Garland; A Star Is Born	Grace Kelly; The Country Girl
Best Supporting Actor	Edmond O'Brien; The Barefoot Contessa		
Best Supporting Actress	Jan Sterling; The High and the Mighty		Eva Marie Saint; On the Waterfront
Best Screenplay, Adapted	Ernest Lehman; Sabrina		George Seaton; The Country Girl
Best Screenplay, Original	Ernest Lehman; Sabrina		Budd Schulberg; On the Waterfront
Best Foreign Language Film	Genevieve; The Lady of the Camellias; No Way Back; Twenty-Four Eyes		Gate of Hell

== Top ten money-making stars ==
Exhibitors selected the following as the Top Ten Money Making Stars of the Year in Quigley Publishing Company's annual poll. John Wayne became the first actor to regain the number one spot after losing that position.

Rank	Actor/Actress
1.	John Wayne
2.	Dean Martin and Jerry Lewis
3.	Gary Cooper
4.	James Stewart
5.	Marilyn Monroe
6.	Alan Ladd
7.	William Holden
8.	Bing Crosby
9.	Jane Wyman
10.	Marlon Brando

=== Top Western stars ===
The poll also revealed the top Western stars.

Rank	Actor/Actress
1.	Roy Rogers
2.	Gene Autry
3.	Rex Allen
4.	Wild Bill Elliott
5.	Gabby Hayes

== Notable films released in 1954 ==
United States unless stated

=== # ===
- 3 Ring Circus, starring Dean Martin and Jerry Lewis
- 20,000 Leagues Under the Sea, starring Kirk Douglas and James Mason

=== A ===
- Aar Paar (This or That), directed by and starring Guru Dutt – (India)
- About Mrs. Leslie, starring Shirley Booth
- Robinson Crusoe (Aventuras de Robinson Crusoe), directed by Luis Buñuel – (Mexico)
- Alaska Seas, starring Robert Ryan and Jan Sterling
- Amar (Immortal), starring Madhubala, Nimmi and Dilip Kumar – (India)
- An American in Rome (Un americano a Roma), starring Alberto Sordi – (Italy)
- Andha Naal (That Day) – (India)
- Animal Farm, an animated film – (GB)
- Apache, starring Burt Lancaster
- Attila, starring Anthony Quinn and Sophia Loren – (France/Italy)

=== B ===
- Bahut Din Huwe, starring Madhubala – (India)
- The Back of Beyond – (Australia)
- The Barefoot Contessa, directed by Joseph L. Mankiewicz, starring Humphrey Bogart, Ava Gardner, Edmond O'Brien, Rossano Brazzi
- Beachhead, starring Tony Curtis and Mary Murphy
- Beau Brummell, starring Stewart Granger, Elizabeth Taylor, Peter Ustinov
- Beautiful Stranger, aka Twist of Fate, starring Ginger Rogers – (GB/U.S.)
- The Belles of St. Trinian's, starring Alastair Sim, Joyce Grenfell and George Cole – (GB)
- Betrayed, fourth and final film co-starring Clark Gable and Lana Turner
- A Big Family (Bolshaya semya) – (USSR)
- The Black Knight, starring Alan Ladd – (GB/U.S.)
- The Black Shield of Falworth, starring Tony Curtis and Janet Leigh
- Black Tuesday, starring Edward G. Robinson and Peter Graves
- Black Widow, starring Ginger Rogers, Gene Tierney, Peggy Ann Garner, Van Heflin, George Raft
- Boot Polish – (India)
- Boris Godunov – (USSR)
- The Bowery Boys Meet the Monsters, starring Leo Gorcey, Huntz Hall and Ellen Corby
- Bread, Love and Jealousy (Pane, Amore e Gelosia), starring Vittorio De Sica and Gina Lollobrigida – (Italy)
- The Bridges at Toko-Ri, directed by Mark Robson, starring William Holden, Grace Kelly, Fredric March, Mickey Rooney
- Brigadoon, directed by Vincente Minnelli, starring Gene Kelly, Cyd Charisse, Van Johnson
- Broken Lance, starring Spencer Tracy, Robert Wagner, Jean Peters, Richard Widmark, Katy Jurado

=== C ===
- Cadet Rousselle, directed by André Hunebelle, starring François Périer and Dany Robin – (France)
- The Caine Mutiny, directed by Edward Dmytryk, starring Humphrey Bogart, Van Johnson, Fred MacMurray, José Ferrer, Robert Francis, May Wynn, E. G. Marshall
- Canaris, directed by Alfred Weidenmann – (West Germany)
- Carmen Jones, starring Dorothy Dandridge (first African-American to be Oscar-nominated for Best Actress)
- Casanova's Big Night, starring Bob Hope
- Chronicle of Poor Lovers (Cronache di poveri amanti) – (Italy)
- Circus Fandango – (Norway)
- The Country Girl, directed by George Seaton, starring Bing Crosby, Grace Kelly, William Holden
- Creature from the Black Lagoon, directed by Jack Arnold
- Crime Wave, directed by André de Toth, starring Sterling Hayden and Phyllis Kirk
- Crossed Swords ([Il Maestro di Don Giovanni]), starring Errol Flynn and Gina Lollobrigida – (United States/Italy)
- The Crucified Lovers (Chikamatsu Monogatari), directed by Kenji Mizoguchi, starring Kazuo Hasegawa – (Japan)

=== D ===
- Dangerous Mission, starring Victor Mature and Piper Laurie
- Deep in My Heart, directed by Stanley Donen, starring José Ferrer and Merle Oberon
- Demetrius and the Gladiators, starring Victor Mature and Susan Hayward
- Désirée, starring Marlon Brando and Jean Simmons
- Dial M for Murder, directed by Alfred Hitchcock, starring Ray Milland, Robert Cummings, Grace Kelly
- Doctor in the House, starring Dirk Bogarde, first of "Doctor" series – (GB)
- Down Three Dark Streets, starring Broderick Crawford and Ruth Roman
- Drive a Crooked Road, starring Mickey Rooney and Dianne Foster
- Drum Beat, directed by Delmer Daves, starring Alan Ladd

=== E ===
- The Egyptian, starring Jean Simmons, Gene Tierney, Victor Mature, Bella Darvi, Edmund Purdom
- Eight O'Clock Walk, starring Richard Attenborough and Cathy O'Donnell – (GB)
- Elephant Walk, starring Elizabeth Taylor and Peter Finch
- Executive Suite, starring William Holden, Barbara Stanwyck, June Allyson, Fredric March, Louis Calhern, Walter Pidgeon, Nina Foch

=== F ===
- The Far Country, directed by Anthony Mann, starring James Stewart, Ruth Roman, Walter Brennan
- Father Brown, starring Alec Guinness – (GB)
- Fear (La Paura), directed by Roberto Rossellini, starring Ingrid Bergman – (West Germany/Italy)
- Five Boys from Barska Street (Piątka z ulicy Barskiej) – (Poland)
- Flame and the Flesh, starring Lana Turner
- French Cancan, starring Jean Gabin – (France/Italy)
- The French Line, starring Jane Russell

=== G ===
- Garden of Evil, starring Gary Cooper, Susan Hayward, Richard Widmark
- The Glenn Miller Story, directed by Anthony Mann, starring Jimmy Stewart and June Allyson
- Godzilla (Gojira), directed by Ishirō Honda – (Japan)
- Gorilla at Large, directed by Harmon Jones, starring Cameron Mitchell, Anne Bancroft and Raymond Burr
- The Gold of Naples (L'oro di Napoli), directed by Vittorio De Sica, starring Silvana Mangano and Sophia Loren – (Italy)
- The Good Die Young, directed by Lewis Gilbert, starring Stanley Baker and Laurence Harvey – (GB)

=== H ===
- Hansel and Gretel: An Opera Fantasy, a Stop motion animated film
- Happy Ever After, starring David Niven and Yvonne De Carlo – (GB)
- Hell and High Water, directed by Samuel Fuller, starring Richard Widmark
- Hell Below Zero, starring Alan Ladd
- Hell's Half Acre, starring Evelyn Keyes and Wendell Corey
- The High and the Mighty, starring John Wayne, Robert Stack, Laraine Day, Claire Trevor, Phil Harris
- Highway Dragnet, starring Richard Conte and Joan Bennett
- Hobson's Choice, directed by David Lean, starring Charles Laughton and John Mills – (GB)
- The House Across the Lake, aka Heat Wave, starring Alex Nicol and Hillary Brooke – (GB)
- Human Desire, starring Glenn Ford, Gloria Grahame, Broderick Crawford

=== I ===
- Illusion Travels by Streetcar (La ilusión viaja en tranvía), directed by Luis Buñuel, starring Lilia Prado – (Mexico)
- Inauguration of the Pleasure Dome, directed by Kenneth Anger
- An Inspector Calls, with Alastair Sim, based on the J. B. Priestley play – (GB)
- It Should Happen to You, starring Judy Holliday, Peter Lawford, Jack Lemmon

=== J ===
- Jagriti (The Awakening) – (India)
- Johnny Guitar, directed by Nicholas Ray, starring Joan Crawford, Sterling Hayden, Mercedes McCambridge
- Journey to Italy (Viaggio in Italia), directed by Roberto Rossellini, starring Ingrid Bergman and George Sanders – (France/Italy)

=== K ===
- King Richard and the Crusaders, starring Rex Harrison and Virginia Mayo
- Knock on Wood, starring Danny Kaye

=== L ===
- The Lady of the Camellias (La Mujer de las camelias) – (Argentina)
- The Last Bridge (Die Letzte Brücke), starring Maria Schell and Bernhard Wicki – (Austria)
- Late Chrysanthemums (bangiku), directed by Mikio Naruse – (Japan)
- A Lesson in Love (En lektion i kärlek), directed by Ingmar Bergman, starring Eva Dahlbeck and Gunnar Björnstrand – (Sweden)
- A Life at Stake, starring Angela Lansbury
- Liliomfi – (Hungary)
- Living It Up, starring Dean Martin and Jerry Lewis
- The Long, Long Trailer, starring Lucille Ball and Desi Arnaz
- The Long Wait, starring Anthony Quinn
- Loophole, starring Barry Sullivan and Dorothy Malone

=== M ===
- Mad About Men, starring Glynis Johns and Margaret Rutherford – (U.K.)
- Madame X (I Agnostos)Madame X (1954 film) – (Greece)
- Maddalena – (Italy)
- The Maggie, directed by Alexander Mackendrick – (GB)
- The Mad Magician, directed by John Brahm, starring Vincent Price and Mary Murphy
- Magnificent Obsession, directed by Douglas Sirk, starring Jane Wyman and Rock Hudson
- The Million Pound Note, starring Gregory Peck – (GB)

=== N ===
- Nagin, starring Vyjayanthimala and Pradeep Kumar – (India)
- Naked Alibi, starring Sterling Hayden and Gloria Grahame
- The Naked Jungle, starring Eleanor Parker and Charlton Heston
- Neelakuyil (The Blue Cuckoo) – (India)
- Night People, directed by Nunnally Johnson, starring Gregory Peck, Broderick Crawford, Buddy Ebsen
- Nothing But Trouble (Aldri annet enn bråk) – (Norway)

=== O ===
- On the Waterfront, directed by Elia Kazan, starring Marlon Brando with Eva Marie Saint, Karl Malden, Lee J. Cobb, Rod Steiger—winner of eight Oscars
- On Trial (L'affaire Maurizius; Il caso Mauritius), directed by Julien Duvivier – (France/Italy)
- The Outcast, starring John Derek

=== P ===
- Phantom of the Rue Morgue, starring Karl Malden, Patricia Medina, Merv Griffin
- Phffft, starring Judy Holliday, Jack Lemmon, Kim Novak
- Pride of the Blue Grass, starring Lloyd Bridges and Vera Miles
- Prince Valiant, starring Robert Wagner, James Mason, Janet Leigh
- Prisoner of War, starring Ronald Reagan
- Private Hell 36, directed by Don Siegel, starring Ida Lupino
- Pushover, starring Fred MacMurray and Kim Novak (in her film debut)

=== R ===
- Radio Cab Murder, directed by Vernon Sewell, starring Jimmy Hanley and Lana Morris – (GB)
- The Raid, starring Van Heflin, Anne Bancroft, Lee Marvin
- Rear Window, directed by Alfred Hitchcock, starring James Stewart, Grace Kelly, Thelma Ritter, Wendell Corey, Raymond Burr
- Red Garters, directed by George Marshall, starring Rosemary Clooney
- Return to Treasure Island, starring Tab Hunter
- Riot in Cell Block 11, directed by Don Siegel, starring Neville Brand
- River of No Return, directed by Otto Preminger, starring Robert Mitchum and Marilyn Monroe
- Robinson Crusoe, starring Dan O'Herlihy
- Rogue Cop, starring Robert Taylor and Janet Leigh
- Romeo and Juliet, starring Laurence Harvey – (Italy/GB)

=== S ===
- Sabrina, directed by Billy Wilder, starring Humphrey Bogart, Audrey Hepburn, William Holden
- Salt of the Earth, starring Rosaura Revueltas and Will Geer
- Samurai I: Musashi Miyamoto (Miyamoto Musashi), directed by Hiroshi Inagaki, starring Toshiro Mifune – (Japan)
- Sansho the Bailiff (Sanshō Dayũ), directed by Kenji Mizoguchi, starring Kinuyo Tanaka – (Japan)
- Saskatchewan, starring Alan Ladd
- The Sea Shall Not Have Them, directed by Lewis Gilbert, starring Michael Redgrave, Dirk Bogarde, Anthony Steel, Nigel Patrick – (GB)
- Secret of the Incas, starring Charlton Heston
- The Seekers, starring Jack Hawkins and Glynis Johns – (GB)
- Senso, directed by Luchino Visconti, starring Alida Valli and Farley Granger – (Italy)
- Seven Brides for Seven Brothers, directed by Stanley Donen, starring Jane Powell and Howard Keel
- Seven Samurai (Shichinin no Samurai), directed by Akira Kurosawa, starring Toshiro Mifune and Takashi Shimura – (Japan)
- She Couldn't Say No, starring Robert Mitchum and Jean Simmons
- Shield for Murder, starring Edmond O'Brien
- The Silver Chalice, starring Paul Newman (in his film debut)
- Silver Lode, starring Dan Duryea
- Sira` Fi al-Wadi (Struggle in the Valley), directed by Youssef Chahine – (Egypt)
- Sitting Bull, starring Dale Robertson and J. Carrol Naish
- Sound of the Mountain (Yama no Oto), directed by Mikio Naruse – (Japan)
- A Star Is Born, directed by George Cukor, starring Judy Garland and James Mason, musical remake of 1937 film
- Star of India, starring Cornel Wilde and Herbert Lom – (GB)
- La strada (The Road), directed by Federico Fellini, starring Anthony Quinn – (Italy)
- Stranger from Venus, directed by Burt Balaban, starring Patricia Neal and Derek Bond
- Suddenly, starring Frank Sinatra and Sterling Hayden
- Supir Istimewa, directed by Rempo Urip and starring MS Priyadi and Ermina Zaenah (Indonesia)
- Susan Slept Here, starring Debbie Reynolds and Dick Powell

=== T ===
- Tanganyika, starring Van Heflin and Ruth Roman
- Taza, Son of Cochise, starring Rock Hudson
- Them!, starring James Whitmore, Edmund Gwenn, Joan Weldon, James Arness
- There's No Business Like Show Business, starring Ethel Merman, Dan Dailey, Donald O'Connor, Mitzi Gaynor, Marilyn Monroe
- They Who Dare, starring Dirk Bogarde – (GB)
- Three Coins in the Fountain, starring Jean Peters, Dorothy McGuire, Maggie McNamara
- Three Young Texans, starring Jeffrey Hunter, Mitzi Gaynor, Keefe Brasselle
- Too Bad She's Bad (Peccato che sia una canaglia), starring Marcello Mastroianni, Sophia Loren, Vittorio De Sica – (Italy)
- Top Banana, starring Phil Silvers
- Touchez pas au grisbi (Hands Off the Loot), starring Jean Gabin – (France/Italy)
- Track of the Cat, directed by William A. Wellman, starring Robert Mitchum and Teresa Wright
- Twenty-Four Eyes (Nijū-shi no Hitomi) – (Japan)
- Twist of Fate, starring Ginger Rogers

=== V ===
- Vera Cruz, starring Gary Cooper and Burt Lancaster

=== W ===
- The Weak and the Wicked, directed by J. Lee Thompson, starring Glynis Johns and Diana Dors – (GB)
- West of Zanzibar (1954 film), directed by Harry Watt, starring Anthony Steel, Sheila Sim, Edric Connor & Orlando Martins – (U.K.)
- White Christmas, directed by Michael Curtiz, starring Bing Crosby, Danny Kaye, Rosemary Clooney, Vera-Ellen, Dean Jagger
- Windfall in Athens (Kyriakatiko xypnima), directed by Michael Cacoyannis – (Greece)
- Witness to Murder, directed by Roy Rowland, starring Barbara Stanwyck, Gary Merrill, George Sanders
- Woman's World, starring June Allyson, Clifton Webb, Fred MacMurray, Van Heflin, Lauren Bacall, Arlene Dahl
- Wyoming Renegades, starring Phil Carey

=== Y ===
- Young at Heart, starring Frank Sinatra and Doris Day
- The Young Lovers, directed by Anthony Asquith – (GB)

== Serials ==
- Gunfighters of the Northwest, starring Clayton Moore and Phyllis Coates
- Man with the Steel Whip, starring Dick Simmons
- Riding with Buffalo Bill
- Trader Tom of the China Seas, starring Harry Lauter and Aline Towne

== Short film series ==
- Looney Tunes (1930–1969)
- Terrytoons (1930–1964)
- Merrie Melodies (1931–1969)
- Popeye (1933–1957)
- The Three Stooges (1934–1959)
- Bugs Bunny (1940–1964)
- Tom and Jerry (1940–1958)
- Mighty Mouse (1942–1955)
- Chip 'n' Dale (1943–1956)
- Droopy (1943–1958)
- Barney Bear (1939–1954)
- Yosemite Sam (1945–1963)
- Speedy Gonzales (1953–1968)
- Ranger Don (1953–1956)

== Births ==
- January 1
  - Richard Edson, American actor and musician
  - Richard Gibson, British actor
  - Rawiri Paratene, New Zealand actor, director and writer
  - Helen Wellington-Lloyd, South African-born British artist and actress
- January 6
  - Anthony Minghella, English film director and screenwriter (d. 2008)
  - John Sparkes, Welsh actor and comedian
  - Trudie Styler, English actress, director and producer
- January 19 - Katey Sagal, American actress and singer-songwriter
- January 20 - Ken Page, American actor and cabaret singer (d. 2024)
- January 25 - Sean Lawlor, Irish character actor and playwright (d. 2009)
- January 28 - Kaneto Shiozawa, Japanese actor, voice actor and narrator (d. 2000)
- January 29
  - Juan de Marcos González, Cuban bandleader, musician and actor
  - Terry Kinney, American actor
  - Oprah Winfrey, American actress and television personality
- February 2 – Christie Brinkley, American model and actress
- February 6 – Aare Laanemets, Estonian actor (d. 2000)
- February 8 - Alistair Browning, New Zealand actor (d. 2019)
- February 9 - Leslie Bevis, retired American model and actress
- February 12 - Zach Grenier, American character actor
- February 15 – Matt Groening, American animator, writer, producer, voice actor and creator of The Simpsons and Futurama
- February 17 – Rene Russo, American actress
- February 18 – John Travolta, American actor
- February 20 - Anthony Head, English actor and singer (d. 2026)
- February 21 - Christopher Mayer, American actor (d. 2011)
- March 1
  - Ron Howard, American director and actor
  - Peter Spellos, American voice actor (d. 2023)
- March 2 - Olwen Fouéré, Irish actress
- March 4 – Catherine O'Hara, Canadian-American actress (d. 2026)
- March 8
  - James Carter Cathcart, American voice actor and voice director (d. 2025)
  - Jay Arlen Jones, American actor
- March 9 - Martin P. Robinson, American puppeteer
- March 13 - Robin Duke, Canadian actress and comedian
- March 15 – Craig Wasson, American actor
- March 17 – Lesley-Anne Down, English actress
- March 22 - Tommy Hollis, American actor (d. 2001)
- March 24 – Robert Carradine, American actor (d. 2026)
- March 29 - Dianne Kay, retired American actress
- April 2 - Bill Block, American producer
- April 7
  - Patricia Belcher, American actress
  - Jackie Chan, Hong Kong-born actor
- April 9 – Dennis Quaid, American actor
- April 10
  - Peter MacNicol, American actor
  - Deborah Rush, American actress
- April 16 – Ellen Barkin, American actress
- April 19 - Lucinda Dooling, Puerto-Rican-born American actress (d. 2015)
- April 20 - Brett Rice, American actor
- April 21 - James Morrison, American actor
- April 23 - Lucinda Jenney, American actress
- April 25 - George Spartels, Australian actor, presenter, director and musician
- April 27 – John Cygan, American actor, voice artist and comedian (d. 2017)
- April 28 - John Pankow, American actor
- April 29 – Jerry Seinfeld, American stand-up comedian and actor
- May 4 - Pia Zadora, American actress and singer
- May 7 – Amy Heckerling, American director
- May 8
  - Stephen Furst, American actor, director and producer (d. 2017)
  - David Keith, American actor and director
  - Clive Wood, British actor
- May 10 - Mike Hagerty, American actor (d. 2022)
- May 18 - Patrick St. Esprit, American character actor
- May 21 - Jean Kasem, American former actress
- May 25
  - Chelli Goldenberg, Israeli actress and writer
  - Trevor Steedman, British actor and stuntman (d. 2016)
- May 29 - Pankaj Kapur, Indian actor
- June 2
  - Dennis Haysbert, American actor
  - Jeannine Taylor, American actress
- June 5 - Haluk Bilginer, Turkish actor
- June 6 – Merle Talvik, Estonian actress
- June 7 - Bobby Di Cicco, American actor
- June 14
  - Will Patton, American actor
  - Jan Rabson, American actor and voice actor (d. 2022)
- June 15 – Jim Belushi, American actor
- June 19 – Kathleen Turner, American actress
- June 21 - Robert Pastorelli, American actor (d. 2004)
- June 22 – Chris Lemmon, American actor and author
- June 26 - David Steen, American playwright, actor and writer
- June 27 - Anita Zagaria, Italian actress
- June 28 – Alice Krige, South African actress
- July 2
  - Eddie Rouse, American character actor (d. 2014)
  - Wendy Schaal, American actress
- July 5 - Don Stark, American actor
- July 10 - Lim Kay Tong, Singaporean actor
- July 31 - Rainer Bock, German actor
- August 4 – Donald Gibb, American actor (d. 2026)
- August 10 - Rick Overton, American actor, comedian and screenwriter
- August 12 – Sam J. Jones, American actor
- August 13 – Tõnu Kilgas, Estonian actor and singer
- August 15 - Sean Bury, British actor
- August 16 – James Cameron, Canadian-born director
- August 18 - Winnie Holzman, American screenwriter, actor and producer
- August 20
  - Al Roker, American weather forecaster, journalist, television personality, actor and author
  - Theresa Saldana, American actress and writer (d. 2016)
- August 22 - Jay Patterson, American actor
- August 23 - Charles Busch, American actor and screenwriter
- August 30 - David Paymer, American actor
- September 4 - James Martin Kelly, American character actor
- September 11 - Reed Birney, American actor
- September 13 - Isiah Whitlock Jr., American actor (d. 2025)
- September 15
  - Brad Leland, American actor
  - Barry Shabaka Henley, American character actor
- September 19
  - David Bamber, English actor
  - Blanche Ravalec, French actress and dubbing artist
- September 23 - Giovanni Lombardo Radice, Italian actor and screenwriter (d. 2023)
- September 29
  - Mark Mitchell, Australian actor and comedian
  - Cindy Morgan, American actress (d. 2023)
- October 2 – Lorraine Bracco, American actress
- October 9
  - Scott Bakula, American actor
  - John O'Hurley, American actor, comedian, singer, author, game show host and television personality
- October 10
  - David Barron, British producer
  - Rekha, Indian actress
  - Patric Zimmerman, retired American voice actor
- October 11
  - Tim Choate, American actor (d. 2004)
  - Arno Liiver, Estonian actor (d. 2026)
- October 12 - Fabio Sartor, Italian actor (d. 2024)
- October 14 - Elizabeth Sung, Chinese-American actress, director and screenwriter (d. 2018)
- October 15 - Jere Burns, American actor
- October 18
  - Arliss Howard, American actor, screenwriter and director
  - Bob Weinstein, American producer
- October 19 - Ken Stott, Scottish actor
- October 23 – Ang Lee, Taiwanese director
- October 26
  - D. W. Moffett, American actor
  - James Pickens Jr., American actor
- November 3 - Kathy Kinney, American actress and comedian
- November 5 - Mike Gabriel, American animator and director
- November 7 – Kamal Haasan, Indian actor, director, script-writer, producer and singer
- November 13 - Chris Noth, American actor
- November 19 – Kathleen Quinlan, American actress
- November 20 - Richard Brooker, British actor and stuntman (d. 2013)
- November 21 - Timothy Stack, American actor, producer and screenwriter
- November 29 – Joel Coen, American director, producer and screenwriter
- November 30 - Simonetta Stefanelli, Italian retired actress
- December 2 - Dan Butler, American actor
- December 4 – Tony Todd, American actor and producer (d. 2024)
- December 7 - Pascal Renwick, French voice actor (d. 2006)
- December 9 - Ken Cheeseman, American actor
- December 18 – Ray Liotta, American actor (d. 2022)
- December 20 - Michael Badalucco, American actor
- December 22 - Hugh Quarshie, Ghanaian-born British actor
- December 26 – Tony Rosato, Canadian actor and comedian (d. 2017)
- December 28 – Denzel Washington, American actor

== Deaths ==
- January 5 – Lillian Rich, 54, English actress, The Golden Bed, On the Front Page
- January 11 – Oscar Straus, 83, Viennese composer, La Ronde
- January 16 – Baburao Painter, 63, Indian film director, Savkari Pash
- January 18 – Sydney Greenstreet, 74, English actor, Casablanca, The Maltese Falcon, Christmas in Connecticut, The Mask of Dimitrios
- January 30 – John Murray Anderson, 67, Canadian director, King of Jazz
- January 31 – Florence Bates, 65, American actress, Rebecca
- February 1 – Yvonne de Bray, 64, French actress, Les Parents terribles
- February 9 – Mabel Paige, 73, American actress, Lucky Jordan, Murder, He Says
- February 12 – Dziga Vertov, 58, Russian filmmaker, Man with a Movie Camera
- February 13 – Stephen Auer, 53, American producer, Trail of Kit Carson
- February 21 – William K. Howard, 54, American director, The Power and the Glory, Johnny Come Lately
- March 5 – John Eberson, 78, American movie palace architect
- March 7 – Will H. Hays, 74, American movie censor, first chairman of the Motion Picture Producers and Distributors of America
- March 8 – John L. Balderston, 64, American screenwriter, The Prisoner of Zenda, Gaslight
- March 14 – Otto Gebühr, 76, German actor, The Great King
- March 18 – Louis Lipstone, 61, American conductor, head of Paramount Pictures music department
- March 24 – Alberto Colombo, 65, American film composer and music director, Portia on Trial
- March 30 – Pauline Brunius, 73, Swedish actress, director and screenwriter, Charles XII
- April 1 – Jack Lait, 71, American author, New York Confidential
- April 3 – Ernest Vajda, 67, Hungarian actor and screenwriter, Smilin' Through
- April 4 – Frederick Lonsdale, 73, English playwright and screenwriter, The Private Life of Don Juan
- April 10 – Auguste Lumiere, 91, French film pioneer
- April 29 – Joe May, 73, Austrian director, The House of Fear, The Invisible Man Returns
- May 1 – Arthur Johnston, 56, Composer, Pennies from Heaven
- May 3 – Tom Tyler, 50, American actor, Adventures of Captain Marvel, The Phantom
- May 15 – Herbert I. Leeds, 54, American director, Mr. Moto in Danger Island
- May 17 – Ethel Hill, 56, American screenwriter, The Little Princess, In Old Oklahoma
- May 18 – Fred Waller, 67, American film pioneer, inventor of Cinerama
- May 20 – Hans von Wolzogen, 65, German film producer and director, Sprengbagger 1010
- May 25 – Hans Janowitz, 63, German writer, The Cabinet of Dr. Caligari
- May 31 – Guglielmo Barnabò, 66, Italian actor, Miracle in Milan
- June 27 – Theodor Loos, 71, German actor, Die Nibelungen
- June 28 – Ludwig Schmitz, 70, German actor, The Heath is Green
- July 1 – Thea von Harbou, 65, German screenwriter, novelist, director and actress, Metropolis
- July 6 – Gabriel Pascal, 60, Hungarian film producer and director, Pygmalion
- July 8 – Gerald Geraghty, 47, American screenwriter, The Jungle Princess
- July 12 – Lord Grantley, 62, British film executive
- July 13 – Irving Pichel, 63, American director and actor, The Most Dangerous Game, Santa Fe, Oliver Twist, How Green Was My Valley
- July 14 – Al Hill, 62, American actor, The Payoff, The Border Patrolman
- July 23 – Leonard Goldstein, 51, American producer, Ma and Pa Kettle
- July 24 – Effie Shannon, 87, American actress, Sally of the Sawdust
- August 4 – Harald Paulsen, 58, German actor and director, Ave Maria
- August 11 – Murray Kinnell, 65, English-born American actor, The Public Enemy
- August 19 – Terry Ramsaye, 68, American producer and movie historian, author of A Million and One Nights: A History of the Motion Picture
- August 24 – Lewis D. Collins, 55, American director, The Desert Trail
- September 3 – Eugene Pallette, 65, American actor, My Man Godfrey, The Adventures of Robin Hood
- September 28 – Bert Lytell, 69, American actor, The Lone Wolf
- October 22 – Charles Skouras, 65, American movie executive and president of Fox West Coast
- October 22 – George McManus, 70, American cartoonist, Bringing Up Father
- November 11 – Reinhold Schünzel, 68, German director and actor, The Ice Follies of 1939, Notorious
- November 15 – Lionel Barrymore, 76, American actor, It's a Wonderful Life, You Can't Take It with You, Key Largo, Treasure Island, Grand Hotel
- November 22 – Moroni Olsen, 65, American actor, The Three Musketeers
- November 22 – Roy Rene, 63, Australian comedian, Strike Me Lucky
- November 29 – Eero Kilpi, 77, Finnish actor, Anna Liisa
- December 6 – Truly Shattuck, 79, American actress, A Wise Fool
- December 8 – Gladys George, 50, American actress, The Maltese Falcon, The Best Years of Our Lives, The Roaring Twenties, Detective Story
- December 18 – Maria Eis, 58, Austrian actress, The Eternal Waltz

== Film debuts ==
- Stanley Adams – The Atomic Kid
- Mario Adorf – 08/15
- Hideyo Amamoto – The Garden of Women
- Ursula Andress – An American in Rome
- R.G. Armstrong – Garden of Eden
- Malcolm Atterbury – Dragnet
- Martin Balsam – On the Waterfront
- Ray Barrett – The Desperate Women
- John Bennett – Diplomatic Passport
- Norman Bird – An Inspector Calls
- Bernard Bresslaw – Doctor in the House
- Sean Connery – Lilacs in the Spring
- Kenneth Cope – Impulse
- Annie Cordy – Royal Affairs in Versailles
- Allan Cuthbertson – Carrington V.C.
- Angie Dickinson – Lucky Me
- Roger Dumas – Wild Fruit
- Lisa Gastoni – They Who Dare
- Charles Grodin – 20,000 Leagues Under the Sea
- Allison Hayes – Francis Joins the WACS
- David Hemmings – The Rainbow Jacket
- Percy Herbert – The Young Lovers
- Pat Hingle – On the Waterfront
- James Hong – Dragonfly Squadron
- Tasso Kavadia – Windfall in Athens
- Kay E. Kuter – Sabrina
- Lotte Ledl – The Forester of the Silver Wood
- Jack Lemmon – It Should Happen to You
- David Lodge – Orders Are Orders
- Elsa Martinelli – The Red and the Black
- Marisa Mell – Das Licht der Liebe
- Gordon Mitchell – Prisoner of War
- Norman Mitchell – The Seekers
- Warren Mitchell – Five Days
- Rosenda Monteros – Reto a la vida
- Paul Newman – The Silver Chalice
- Kim Novak – The French Line
- Patrick O'Neal – The Mad Magician
- Terele Pávez – Boyfriend in Sight
- Donald Pleasence – The Beachcomber
- Stafford Repp – Fireman Save My Child
- Dick Sargent – Prisoner of War
- John Saxon – It Should Happen to You
- Omar Sharif – Devil of the Sahara
- Véronique Silver – Royal Affairs in Versailles
- Eric Sykes – Orders Are Orders
- Rod Taylor – King of the Coral Sea
- Frank Thornton – Radio Cab Murder
- Lino Ventura – Touchez pas au grisbi
- Kenneth J. Warren – Long John Silver
- Douglas Wilmer – The Men of Sherwood Forest
