= Baratin =

1956 film

- Directed by: Jean Stelli
- Written by: Bruno Coquatrix; André Hornez; Roger Nicolas; Jean Stelli
- Based on: Baratin by Jean Valmy
- Produced by: Raymond Horvilleur; Jean Hébey; Michel Kagansky
- Starring: Roger Nicolas; Ginette Baudin; Sylvia Lopez; Jean Tissier
- Cinematography: Victor Arménise
- Edited by: Jean-Charles Dudrumet
- Music by: Henri Betti
- Production companies: Général Productions; Hergi Films
- Distributed by: Compagnie Commerciale Française Cinématographique
- Release date: 31 October 1956
- Running time: 85 minutes
- Country: France
- Language: French

Baratin is a 1956 French musical film directed by Jean Stelli and starring Roger Nicolas, Ginette Baudin, Sylvia Lopez and Jean Tissier. It is based on the 1949 operetta of the same title with which Nicolas had made his name. It was shot at the Victorine Studios in Nice. The film's sets were designed by the art director Louis Le Barbenchon.

== Cast ==
- Roger Nicolas as Roger
- Ginette Baudin as Conchita
- Sylvia Lopez as Patricia
- Jean Tissier as Bouteloup
- Caroline Cler as Lulu
- Gisèle Fréry as Colette
- Micheline Luccioni as Brigitte
- Anne-Marie Carrière as Adélaïde
- Pauline Carton as Blondine
- Jacques Harden as François
- Maurice Bénard as Dubois-Dumas

== Bibliography ==
- Bessy, Maurice & Chirat, Raymond. Histoire du cinéma français: 1956-1960. Pygmalion, 1986.
- Goble, Alan. The Complete Index to Literary Sources in Film. Walter de Gruyter, 1999.
- Rège, Philippe. Encyclopedia of French Film Directors, Volume 1. Scarecrow Press, 2009.
