= Hot Frustrations =

1965 film

- Directed by: Georges Combret
- Written by: Georges Combret; Pierre Maudru
- Cinematography: Pierre Lebon
- Music by: René Sylviano
- Release date: 1965
- Running time: 89 minutes
- Countries: France, Italy
- Language: French

Hot Frustrations (French: La Traite des blanches, Italian: S.2.S. - Base morte chiama Suniper, also known as I Am a Fugitive from a White Slave Gang and Frustrations) is a 1965 French-Italian drama film written and directed by Georges Combret.

== Cast ==
- Reine Rohan as Marisa
- Magali Noël as Louisa
- Paul Guers as Jean
- Jean-Marc Tennberg as Mario
- Evelyne Boursotti as Edith
- Jean-Louis Tristan as Bob
- Françoise Deldick
- Umberto D'Orsi
- Giacomo Furia
- Piero Gerlini
