= Claude Boissol =

French director and screenwriter

- Born: 15 June 1920; Paris, France
- Died: 25 May 2016 (aged 95); Gourdon, France
- Occupations: Director, Screenwriter
- Years active: 1945–1954 (film & TV)

Claude Boissol (1920–2016) was a French film and television director and screenwriter. He co-created the long-running crime television series Commissaire Moulin.

== Selected filmography ==
- Three Boys, One Girl (1948)
- The King of the Bla Bla Bla (1951)
- Music in the Head (1951)
- Monsieur Leguignon, Signalman (1952)
- The Drunkard (1953)
- The Fighting Drummer (1953)
- The Contessa's Secret (1954)
- Rasputin (1954)
- The Whole Town Accuses (1956)
- The Bear's Skin (1957)
- Every Day Has Its Secret (1958)
- Julie the Redhead (1959)
- Napoleon II, the Eagle (1961)

== Bibliography ==
- Andrew, Dudley & Gillain, Anne . A Companion to François Truffaut. John Wiley & Sons, 2013.
- Rège, Philippe. Encyclopedia of French Film Directors, Volume 1. Scarecrow Press, 2009.
