= Albert Duvaleix =

French actor (1893–1962)

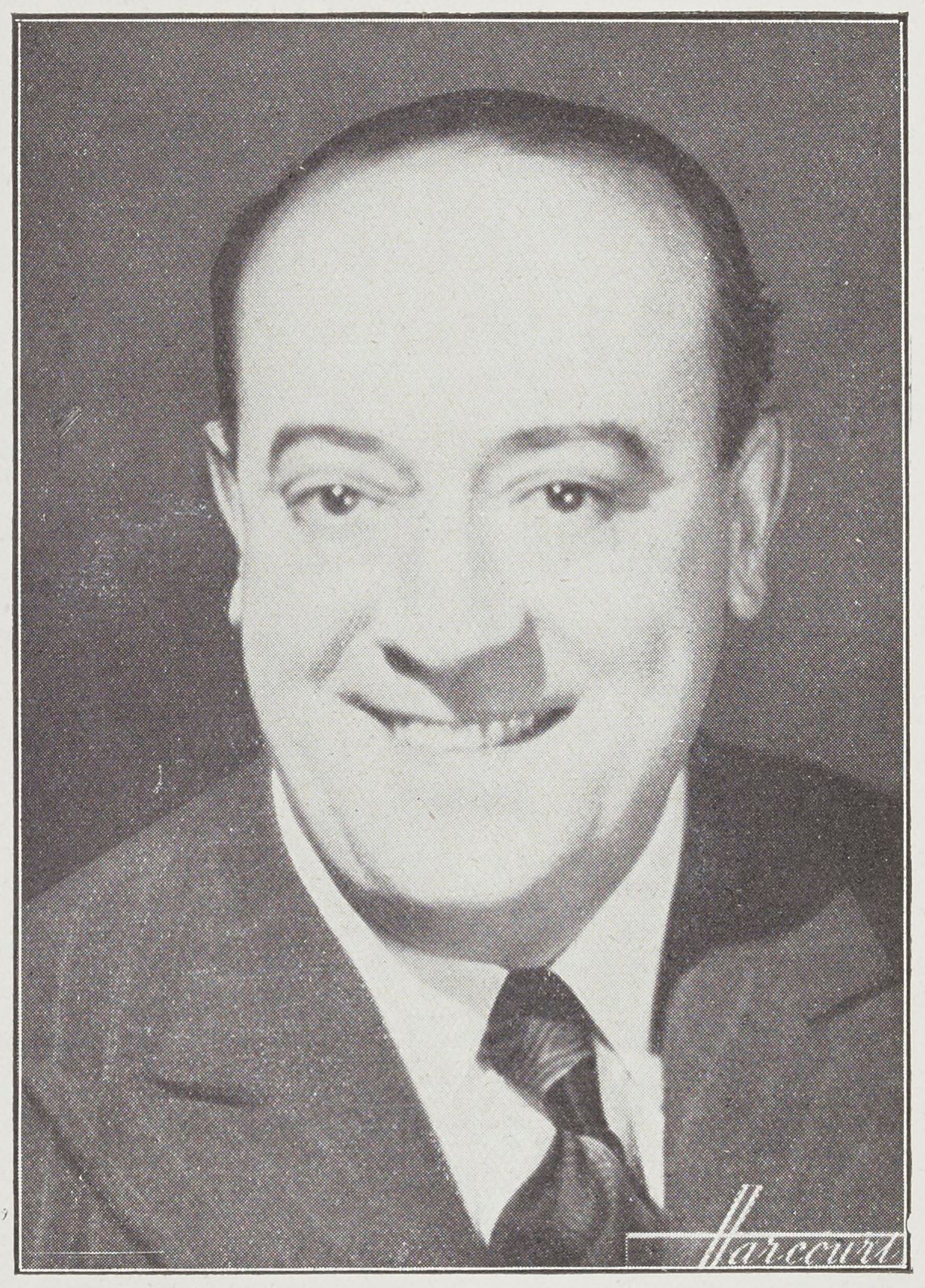
- Duvaleix in 1938
- Born: 7 June 1893; Bordeaux, Gironde, France
- Died: 21 December 1962 (aged 69); Paris, France
- Occupation: Actor
- Years active: 1928-1956 (film)

Albert Duvaleix (1893-1962) was a French stage and film actor. A character actor he appeared in a number of supporting roles in French comedies and drama films. His son Christian Duvaleix also became an actor.

== Selected filmography ==
- Beauty Spot (1932)
- Juanita (1935)
- The Coquelet Affair (1935)
- The Imberger Mystery (1935)
- Marinella (1936)
- The King (1936)
- The Volga Boatman (1936)
- Les Femmes collantes (1938)
- The Porter from Maxim's (1939)
- The Five Cents of Lavarede (1939)
- Metropolitan (1939)
- At Your Command, Madame (1942)
- White Patrol (1942)
- Home Port (1943)
- Night Shift (1944)
- First on the Rope (1944)
- Song of the Clouds (1946)
- Not So Stupid (1946)
- The Unknown Singer (1947)
- The Woman in Red (1947)
- To the Eyes of Memory (1948)
- Thus Finishes the Night (1949)
- Branquignol (1949)
- The Widow and the Innocent (1949)
- The Prize (1950)
- We Will All Go to Paris (1950)
- La Poison (1951)
- Adhémar (1951)
- Deburau (1951)
- The Prettiest Sin in the World (1951)
- No Vacation for Mr. Mayor (1951)
- Savage Triangle (1951)
- Crazy for Love (1952)
- Piédalu Works Miracles (1952)
- Monsieur Leguignon, Signalman (1952)
- Koenigsmark (1953)
- The Drunkard (1953)
- The Fighting Drummer (1953)
- Obsession (1954)
- The Whole Town Accuses (1956)

== Bibliography ==
- Bessy, Maurice & Chirat, Raymond. Histoire du cinéma français: 1929-1934. Pygmalion, 1988.
- Leteux, Christine. Continental Films: French Cinema Under German Control. University of Wisconsin Pres, 2022.
