= The King of the Bla Bla Bla =

- Directed by: Maurice Labro
- Written by: Claude Boissol; Louis d'Yvré
- Starring: Paul Azaïs; Louis de Funès
- Music by: René Sylviano
- Release date: 1951
- Running time: 95 minutes
- Country: France
- Language: French

The King of the Bla Bla Bla (original title "Le Roi du bla bla bla") is a French comedy crime film from 1951, directed by Maurice Labro, written by Claude Boissol, starring Paul Azaïs and Louis de Funès as gangsters Bébert and Gino.

== Cast ==
- Paul Azaïs: Bébert
- Louis de Funès: Gino
- Irène de Trébert: the villain's wife
- Christian Duvaleix: Moustique, the gangster
- Jean-Jacques Delbo: Loustot, the gangster
- Jean Tissier: Mr Lafare, the shady banker
- Lise Delamare: Lucienne Lafare, the banker's wife
- Jean Richard: Jacques
- Roger Nicolas: Prosper Bourrache, the honest hawker
- Robert Lombard: Hubert
- Albert Michel: Charlie
- Serge Berry: Vivarol
- Nicole Guezel: Madeleine
- Ben Chemoul: Riri
- Marcel Loche: a servant
