= Obsession (1954 film) =

- Directed by: Jean Delannoy
- Written by: Roland Laudenbach (adaptation); Jean Delannoy (adaptation); Antoine Blondin (adaptation); Antoine Blondin (dialogue); Roland Laudenbach (dialogue)
- Screenplay by: Jean Delannoy; Antoine Blondin; Roland Laudenbach; Gian Luigi Rondi
- Based on: Silent as the Grave; 1945 story by Cornell Woolrich
- Produced by: Henry Deutschmeister
- Starring: Michèle Morgan; Raf Vallone
- Cinematography: Pierre Montazel
- Edited by: James Cuenet
- Music by: Paul Misraki
- Color process: Eastmancolor
- Production companies: Les Films Gibé; Franco London Films; Continental Film; C.E.I.A.P.
- Distributed by: Teledis
- Release date: 28 October 1954
- Running time: 103 minutes
- Countries: France; Italy
- Language: French

Obsession is a 1954 French crime film directed by Jean Delannoy who co-wrote the screenplay with Antoine Blondin, Roland Laudenbach and Gian Luigi Rondi. The film is based on the story "Silent as the Grave" by Cornell Woolrich written under the pseudonym William Irish. The film stars Michèle Morgan and Raf Vallone.

It tells the story of a couple forming a circus trapeze act, and their involvement in a murder case.

One of the approximately fifteen Cornell Woolrich movies made in France, Germany, Argentina, Japan, and Russia, Obsession, was adapted from two '40s stories, "If the Dead Could Talk" and "Silent as the Grave."

== Cast ==
- Michèle Morgan as Hélène Giovanni
- Raf Vallone as Aldo Giovanni
- Marthe Mercadier as Arlette Bernardin
- Jean Gaven as Alexandre Buisson
- Albert Duvaleix as Barnet (as Duvaleix)
- Robert Dalban as Inspecteur Chardin
- Jean Toulout as Le président des assises
- Dora Doll as L'entaîneuse
- Raphaël Patorni as Bertrand
- Martine Alexis as Olga
- Albert Michel as Le réptonniste de l'hôtel rouennais
- Pierre Moncorbier as Le secrétaire de Chardin (as Moncorbier)
- Aimée Fontenay as La chanteuse au trapèze
- Yves Rozec as Trapéziste
- Louis Seigner as L'avocat général (as Louis Seigner de la Comédie Française)
- Olivier Hussenot as Louis Bernardin
- Jacques Castelot as Me Ritter

== See also ==
- List of French films of 1954
