= Casse-tête chinois pour le judoka =

- Directed by: Maurice Labro
- Written by: Maurice Labro, Jean Meckert
- Story by: Ernie Clark
- Cinematography: Didier Tarot
- Edited by: Marcelle Lehérissey
- Music by: Antoine Duhamel
- Production company: Les Films Corona
- Release dates: 1967 (West Germany); 1968 (France, Italy)
- Countries: France, Germany, Italy
- Language: French

Casse-tête chinois pour le judoka (Italian title: Ore violente, German title: Die sieben Masken des Judoka) is a 1967 French-Italian-German adventure and spy film directed by Maurice Labro.

== Synopsis ==
Marc St. Clair wins a medal at a kendo tournament in Tokyo, which he gives to his American friend Clyde for good luck. As an airplane pilot, Clyde accompanies a C.I.A. agent, Finn, on a secret mission to fly over China to investigate a supersonic bomber. In Clyde's absence, Marc begins an affair with Jennifer, his girlfriend, before learning of the plane's disappearance. Remorseful, Marc leaves for Hong Kong to find Clyde where he confronts the powerful Black Dragons.

== Cast ==
- Marc Briand (Marc St-Clair)
- Marilù Tolo (Jennifer)
- Heinz Drache (Finn)
- Maria Minh (Sutchuen)
- Paolo Tiller (Clyde)
- François Maistre (Dragon)
- Adaly Bayle (Alize)
- André the Giant (fighter)
