= The Fighting Drummer =

1953 film

- Directed by: Georges Combret
- Written by: Claude Boissol; Georges Combret; Louis d'Yvré
- Produced by: Georges Combret
- Cinematography: Pierre Petit
- Edited by: Germaine Fouquet
- Music by: Hubert Giraud
- Production company: Radius Productions
- Distributed by: Warner Bros. (France)
- Release date: 14 January 1953
- Running time: 90 minutes
- Country: France
- Language: French

The Fighting Drummer (French: Tambour battant) is a 1953 French comedy film directed by Georges Combret. The film's sets were designed by the art director Marcel Magniez.

== Cast ==
In alphabetical order

- Alfred Adam as Favrol
- Roland Armontel as Albert Gambier
- Charles Bouillaud as Arthur
- Rita Castel
- André Cornille
- Lou Darley
- Louis de Funès as Le maître d'armes
- Paul Demange
- Albert Duvaleix as Marescot
- Claude Evelyne
- André Gabriello as Bourdelas
- Jimmy Gaillard as Jimmy
- Jacques Hélian as Lui-même
- Sophie Leclair as Nicole Gambier
- Jean Marco
- Émile Mylo
- Patoum
- Alice Tissot as Hortense Gambier - la tante

== Bibliography ==
- Philippe Rège. Encyclopedia of French Film Directors, Volume 1. Scarecrow Press, 2009.
