= Sylvia Lopez =

French model and actress (1933–1959)

- Born: Tatjana Bernt; 10 November 1933; Vienna, Austria
- Died: 20 November 1959 (aged 26); Nice, France
- Other names: Tania Karen; Sylvia Sinclair
- Occupations: Actress, model
- Years active: 1955–1959
- Spouse: Francis Lopez (m. 1956)

Sylvia Lopez (10 November 1933 – 20 November 1959) was a French model and actress.

== Career as a model ==
Born Tatjana Bernt, she was raised in Paris, where she began a career in modelling. Eventually she modelled for couturier Jacques Fath, the first French fashion designer to export his creations to the United States. Appearing under the name "Sylvia Sinclair", Bernt earned enough exposure to attract the attention of film producers.

== Career in acting ==
Lopez made her first of two French-language films following which she appeared in several Italian swashbucklers with American stars such as Steve Reeves and Lex Barker that were commercially successful and for which she received favourable reviews.

== Personal life and death ==
In November 1956 she became the second wife of the composer Francis Lopez.

Diagnosed with leukaemia, Lopez died a few months after she withdrew while working on the set of a film Voulez-vous danser avec moi? (which was posthumously released a month later) with Brigitte Bardot.

Sylvia Lopez is interred in the Cimetière du Montparnasse in Paris.

== Filmography ==
Year	Title	Role	Notes
1956	Baratin	Patricia Dubois-Dumas	as Tania Karen
1957	Cinq millions comptant	Loulou	as Sylvia Sinclair
1957	Mademoiselle and Her Gang	Marie-Christine	Uncredited
1958	Tabarin	Florence Didier	
1959	Herod the Great	Mariam / Miriam	Italian title – Erode il grande
1959	Hercules Unchained	Queen Omphale, of Lidia	Italian title – Ercole e la regina di Lidia
1959	Son of the Red Corsair	Carmen di Montélimar	Italian title – Il Figlio del corsaro rosso
1959	Il Moralista	Woman in the Nightclub in Munich	Uncredited, (final film role)
