= Mario David (actor) =

French actor (1927–1996)

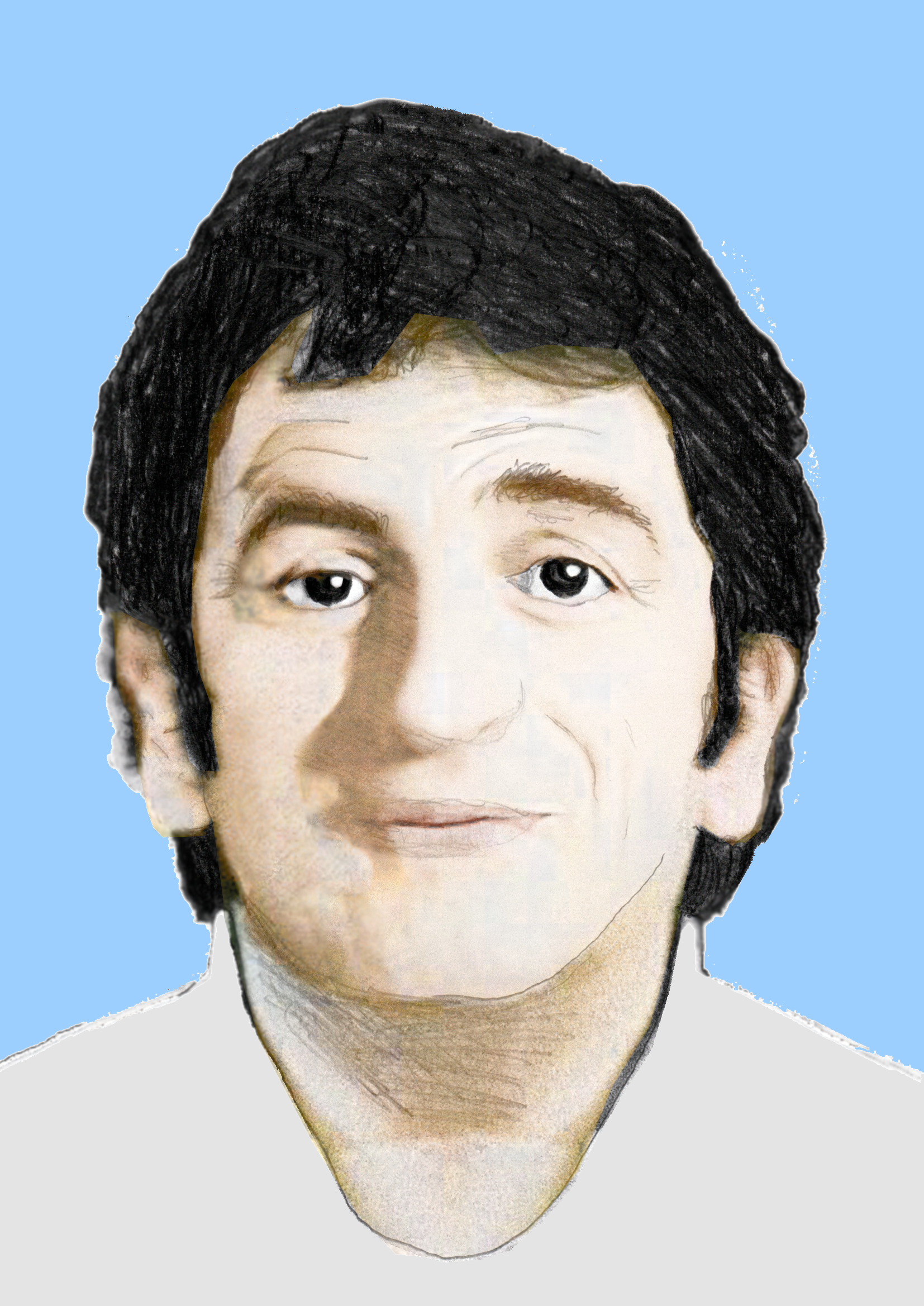
- Born: 9 August 1927; Charleville-Mézières, Ardennes, France
- Died: 29 April 1996 (aged 68); Paris, France
- Occupation: Actor
- Years active: 1952-1994 (film & TV)

Mario David (1927–1996) was a French film and television actor. A character actor he appeared on screen from the 1950s to the 1990s in supporting roles.

== Biography ==
He was educated at the school in Saint-Léonard-de-Noblat. He began his artistic career at a very early age in the world of circus and cabaret, where he worked as a clown, acrobat, and animal trainer of wild animals.

He also had a respectable career in bodybuilding, which helped him develop a strong physique that he later used to advantage in his acting career. Often cast in supporting roles, he frequently portrayed the naïve crook, the simple brute, or the tough man with a kind heart.

Robert Dhéry hired him into his famous troupe Les Branquignols, and in 1954 Robert Hossein employed him at the Grand-Guignol theatre.

On television, he appeared in Les Cinq Dernières Minutes by Claude Loursais, Vidocq by Marcel Bluwal, La Tête des autres by Raymond Rouleau, Les Saintes Chéries by Jean Becker, and Les Dossiers secrets de l'inspecteur Lavardin by Claude Chabrol.

He became especially popular in cinema through his many supporting roles, notably alongside Louis de Funès. One of his notable appearances was in the film Oscar, directed by Édouard Molinaro, where he performs a humorous display of his pectoral and triceps muscles. He played Philippe Dubois, a somewhat dim-witted and naïve massage therapist, a role he had first performed on stage in the play Oscar, directed by Jacques Mauclair in 1958, and again in 1971.

On screen, he was also directed by Jean Renoir in The Elusive Corporal (1962). Claude Chabrol frequently cast him in his films, including Les Bonnes Femmes (1960), Landru (1963), and The Hatter's Ghost (1982). One of his final roles, in 1994, was in another Chabrol film, L'Enfer.

He also collaborated with Robert Hossein in staging major historical productions about the French Revolution.

He was married to Françoise Cornu, with whom he had a daughter named Élisa.

Mario David died of a pulmonary embolism at the Pitié-Salpêtrière Hospital in Paris. He was buried in the main Louyat Cemetery (sector 6) in Limoges (Haute-Vienne).

== Selected filmography ==
- Love Is Not a Sin (1952) - L'agent dans l'escalier (uncredited)
- The Tour of the Grand Dukes (1953) - Une attraction au 'Balajo' (uncredited)
- The Pirates of the Bois de Boulogne (1954) - L'athlète qui court au mois
- Ah! Les belles bacchantes (1954) - L'Homme à 'La création du Monde' (uncredited)
- Cherchez la femme (1955)
- Impasse des vertus (1955)
- Gas-Oil (1955) - Un client des Serin (deleted scenes)
- Une fille épatante (1955) - Mario
- More Whiskey for Callaghan (1955) - Amédée
- Naughty Girl (1956) - The Friesian
- Pardonnez nos offenses (1956)
- L'Homme et l'Enfant (1956) - Alec
- Et par ici la sortie (1957) - Honoré
- Nous autres à Champignol (1957) - Gino un sportif de Fouzy
- The Tricyclist (1957) - Dabek - le gardien de but
- Anyone Can Kill Me (1957) - Paulo - un détenu
- The Cat (1958) - Un résistant (uncredited)
- A Bullet in the Gun Barrel (1958) - Le protecteur évincé
- Le Sicilien (1958) - Mastic
- The Gendarme of Champignol (1959) - Un homme au restaurant
- Quem Matou Leda? (1959) - Roger - le laitier
- Web of Passion (1959) - Roger - le laitier
- Guinguette (1959) - Un fêtard
- Nathalie, agent secret (1959) - (uncredited)
- Certains l'aiment froide (1960) - Le masseur
- Les Bonnes Femmes (1960) - Ernest Lapierre (le motocycliste)
- Recours en grâce (1960) - Jacques
- The Love Game (1960) - Le représentant
- Les Tortillards (1960) - L'automobiliste (uncredited)
- Wise Guys (1961)
- Les moutons de Panurge (1961) - Un supporter
- Les livreurs (1961) - La brute
- A Man Named Rocca (1961) - Charlot l'élégant
- Le Tracassin (1961) - Le moniteur
- The Elusive Corporal (1962) - Caruso
- Landru (1963) - Prosecutor
- Les bricoleurs (1963) - Le lanceur de couteaux
- La bande à Bobo (1963) - Le pompier
- Le commissaire mène l'enquête (1963) - Le serrurier (segment "Fermez votre porte")
- Comment épouser un premier ministre (1964)
- Le Tigre aime la chair fraiche (1964) - Dobronsky
- The Gorillas (1964) - Bercy
- L'enfer (1964) - Julien
- Up to His Ears (1965) - Roquentin
- Le caïd de Champignol (1966) - Tony
- Line of Demarcation (1966) - Urbain, le garde-chasse
- Shock Troops (1967) - Le chauffeur de car
- Oscar (1967) - Philippe Dubois
- Un choix d'assassins (1967) - Scarlatti
- Le fou du labo IV (1967) - Mario
- Les grandes vacances (1967) - L'automobiliste
- The Man in the Buick (1968) - La Palluche
- Leontine (1968) - Jacky
- Le gendarme se marie (1968) - Le malfrat
- The Brain (1969) - Jean-François - un antiquaire
- A Golden Widow (1969) - Monsieur Sigmund - un admirateur zurichois
- Borsalino (1970) - Mario
- The Breach (1970) - Gerard Mostelle
- L'explosion (1971) - Riton
- The Married Couple of the Year Two (1971) - Requiem - le cocher du prince
- Qu'est-ce qui fait courir les crocodiles? (1971) - Guillaume
- Les malheurs d'Alfred (1972) - Kid Barrantin
- Le Magnifique (1973) - Traffic policeman in the rain
- Vogue la galère (1973, TV Movie) - Hersandieu
- Ursule et Grelu (1974) - Riquet
- Bons baisers... à lundi (1974) - Arouni
- Flic Story (1975) - Raymond Pelletier
- The Gypsy (1975) - Bob
- Drôles de zèbres (1977) - Grégorian
- That Obscure Object of Desire (1977) - Chauffeur (uncredited)
- Animal (1977) - Santos, le Gitan
- La Zizanie (1978) - Le camionneur
- Violette Nozière (1978) - Le directeur de la prison
- The Gendarme and the Extra-Terrestrials (1979) - Le voleur du bidon d'huile
- Coup de tête (1979) - Rumin, le kinési
- La mer couleur de larmes (1980) - Max
- Signé Furax (1981) - Un agent au barrage
- The Hatter's Ghost (1982) - Pigeac
- Tir groupé (1982) - Felix Pejat
- En cas de guerre mondiale, je file à l'étranger (1983) - Bob Grouillet, l'attaché de presse
- De flyvende djævle (1985) - Lazlo Hart
- La vie dissolue de Gérard Floque (1986) - Le chauffeur de taxi
- Stranger in the House (1992) - Abecassis
- Hell (1994) - Duhamel

== Bibliography ==
- Coates-Smith, Michael & McGee, Garry. The Films of Jean Seberg. McFarland, 2014.
- Neupert, Richard John. The End: Narration and Closure in the Cinema. Wayne State University Press, 1995.
