= Roger Nicolas =

French actor

- Born: 16 January 1919; Toul, Meurthe-et-Moselle, France
- Died: 17 August 1977 (aged 58); Saint-Maur-des-Fossés, Val-de-Marne, France
- Occupations: Actor, singer
- Years active: 1949–1971 (film)

Roger Nicolas (16 January, 1919–17 August, 1977) was a French actor, singer, and comedian. He starred in several films during the 1950s. He made his name on the stage in the operetta Baratin.

== Selected filmography ==
- My Aunt from Honfleur (1949)
- The King of the Bla Bla Bla (1951)
- Never Two Without Three (1951)
- The Last Robin Hood (1953)
- Four Days in Paris (1955)
- Baratin (1956)
- Aux frais de la princesse (1969)
- Clodo (1971)

== Bibliography ==
- Brasseur, Roland. Je me souviens encore mieux de Je me souviens: notes pour Je me souviens de Georges Perec à l'usage des générations oublieuses et de celles qui n'ont jamais su. Castor Astral, 2003.
- Goble, Alan. The Complete Index to Literary Sources in Film. Walter de Gruyter, 1999.
