= The Tour of the Grand Dukes =

1953 film

- Directed by: André Pellenc
- Written by: Norbert Carbonnaux; André Pellenc
- Produced by: Pierre Chichério
- Starring: Raymond Bussières; Denise Grey; Christian Duvaleix
- Cinematography: Pierre Petit
- Edited by: Marcelle Lioret
- Music by: Louiguy
- Production company: Pécéfilms
- Distributed by: Sofradis
- Release date: 22 May 1953
- Running time: 85 minutes
- Country: France
- Language: French

The Tour of the Grand Dukes (French: La Tournée des grands ducs) is a 1953 French musical comedy film directed by André Pellenc and starring Raymond Bussières, Denise Grey and Christian Duvaleix as well as featuring the singer Lily Fayol.

== Synopsis ==
Gaston is in love with Brigitte, the daughter of a baroness, who teasingly tells him that she has another lover in Paris. He heads off to the capital to find and confront his rival under the pretext of trying to recruit performers for a charity gala. He is robbed on the way and ends up lost in the world of cabarets. All the other characters come looking for him.

== Cast ==
- Raymond Bussières as Louis, le garçon de café
- Denise Grey as La baronne
- Christian Duvaleix as Gaston Fromageot, le fils du notaire
- Louis de Funès as Le directeur de l'hôtel
- Roméo Carlès as Maître Fromageot, notaire
- Sophie Sel as Brigitte, la fille de la baronne
- Jean Carmet as Le curé du village
- Jean Charpini as Un présentateur de cabaret
- Lily Fayol as Une chanteuse
- June Richmond as La cantatrice
- Jean Daurand as Un dragueur au "Balajo"
- Pierre Duncan as Max, un chauffeur de car
- Mario David as Une attraction au "Balajo"
- Lucien Frégis as Un responsable de cabaret
- Grégoire Gromoff as Le chasseur de l'hôtel
- Louis Viret as Un présentateur de cabaret
- Francisco Grandey as Francisco, le chanteur de charme
- Jean Dunot as Le domestique de la baronne
- Jack Ary as Un homme au "Balajo"
- Sylvain Lévignac as Un homme au bar
- Suzanne Grey as Une barmaid
- Robert Mercier as Un agent
- Jimmy Perrys as Le gendarme à la fin
- Gilda as Une attraction
- Jim Bala as Une attraction
- Les Avalons as Une attraction
- Les 4 Montréal as Une attraction
- Les Cavalcos as Une attraction
- Anak as Une attraction (la danseuse nue)
- Carmen Santana as Une attraction (la danseuse Espagnole)
- Le trio Pigall's as Une attraction
- Jacqueline Florence as Une attraction
- Marie Elys
- Huguette Duval

== Bibliography ==
- Dicale, Bertrand. Louis de Funès, grimaces et gloire. Grasset, 2009.
- Powrie, Phil & Cadalanu, Marie. The French Film Musical. Bloomsbury Publishing, 2020.
- Price, David. Cancan!. Cygnus Arts, 1998.
