= Hercules Unchained =

- U.S. film poster
- Ercole e la regina di Lidia (Italian)
- Directed by: Pietro Francisci
- Screenplay by: Ennio De Concini; Pietro Francisci
- Story by: Pietro Francisci
- Based on: Oedipus at Colonus by Sophocles Seven Against Thebes by Aeschylus
- Produced by: Bruno Vailati
- Starring: Steve Reeves; Sylva Koscina; Primo Carnera; Sylvia Lopez
- Cinematography: Mario Bava
- Edited by: Mario Serandrei
- Music by: Enzo Masetti
- Production companies: Lux Film; Galatea Film; Lux Compagnie Cinématographique de France
- Distributed by: Lux Film
- Release dates: 14 February 1959 (Italy); 30 June 1960 (United States)
- Running time: 97 minutes
- Countries: Italy; France
- Language: Italian
- Box office: $2.5 million (U.S./Canada rentals)

Hercules Unchained (Italian: Ercole e la regina di Lidia [ˈɛrkole е la reˈdʒiːna di ˈliːdja], "Hercules and the Queen of Lydia") is a 1959 Italian-French epic fantasy feature film starring Steve Reeves and Sylva Koscina in a story about two warring brothers and Hercules' tribulations in the court of Queen Omphale. The film is the sequel to the Reeves vehicle Hercules (1958) and marks Reeves' second—and last—appearance as Hercules. The film's screenplay, loosely based upon various Greek mythology and plays by Aeschylus and Sophocles, was written by Ennio De Concini and Pietro Francisci with Francisci directing, and Bruno Vailati and Ferruccio De Martino producing the film.

== Plot ==
While travelling, Hercules is asked to intervene in a quarrel between two brothers, Eteocles and Polynices, over who should rule Thebes. Before he can complete this task, Hercules drinks from a magic spring and is hypnotized by a harem girl who dances the "Dance of Shiva". He then loses his memory and becomes the captive of Queen Omphale of Lydia. The queen retains men until she tires of them, whereupon they are turned into statues. While young Ulysses tries to help him regain his memory, Hercules' wife, Iole, finds herself in danger from Eteocles, current ruler of Thebes, who plans on throwing her to the wild beasts in his entertainment arena. Hercules slays three tigers in succession and rescues his wife, then assists the Theban army in repelling mercenary attackers hired by Polynices. The two brothers ultimately fight one another for the throne and end up killing each other; the good high priest Creon is elected by acclaim.

== Cast ==
- Steve Reeves as Hercules
- Sylvia Lopez as Queen Omphale of Lydia
- Sylva Koscina as Iole
- Sergio Fantoni as Eteocles
- Mimmo Palmara as Polynices
- Gabriele Antonini as Ulysses
- Fulvio Carrara as Castor
- Willi Colombini as Pollux
- Gian Paolo Rosmino as Aesculapius
- Gino Mattera as Orpheus
- Primo Carnera as Antaeus
- Cesare Fantoni as King Oedipus
- Daniele Vargas as Amphiaraus
- Carlo D'Angelo as High Priest Creon
- Gianni Loti as Sandone
- Fulvia Franco as Anticlea
- Colleen Bennett as the prima ballerina
- Nando Cicero as Lastene

== Production ==
The tale of Hercules and Queen Omphale is taken from the ancient Greek myth, of which there are several variations throughout history. Character names are drawn from a mixture of various Greek legends and plays, notably The Seven Against Thebes by Aeschylus and Oedipus at Colonus by Sophocles. Hercules' line "I wove the threads [of my memory] together" is a reference to his task of spinning thread and weaving with Omphale's attendants. The film is loosely based on the source material, randomly mixing events and featuring characterizations varying from those depicted in the sources.

== Reception ==
Film critic Howard Hughes argues that, due to a better script, "punchier action," and more convincing acting, the film was "superior to its predecessor" Hercules. Concerning the cast, he praises in particular the French actress Sylvia Lopez ("movingly effective") whose career ended prematurely when in 1959, soon after finishing the film, she died at the age of 26 of leukemia.

The film opened in New England on 30 June 1960 in 200 theaters, grossing $500,000 in a week. The film was the third most popular movie at the British box office in 1960. In its opening in the U.K. over the first August Bank Holiday weekend, it set 36 house records in 39 theaters.

== Legacy ==
Hercules Unchained has been broadcast on American television and is available in both VHS and DVD formats. The film was also featured in episode #408 of Mystery Science Theater 3000.

== Comic book adaption ==
- Dell Four Color #1121 (August 1960)

== See also ==
- List of films featuring Hercules
- Peplum film genre
- Samson
- Hercules
- Sons of Hercules
- Maciste
- Ursus
- Goliath
- Sandokan
- Steve Reeves

== Bibliography ==
- Hughes, Howard (2011). Cinema Italiano – The Complete Guide from Classics to Cult. London – New York: I.B.Tauris. ISBN 978-1-84885-608-0.
