= Norbert Carbonnaux =

French film director and screenwriter

- Born: 28 March 1918; Neuilly-sur-Seine
- Died: 6 November 1997 (aged 79)
- Occupation: Film director

Norbert Carbonnaux (28 March 1918 – 6 November 1997), was a French film director and screenwriter.

== Filmography ==
=== Director ===
- 1951: 90 degrés à l'ombre
- 1953: La Tournée des grands ducs
- 1954: The Pirates of the Bois de Boulogne
- 1956: Short Head
- 1958: Le Temps des œufs durs
- 1960: Candide ou l'Optimisme au XXe siècle
- 1962: The Dance
- 1967: All Mad About Him
- 1971: L'Ingénu

=== Screenwriter ===
- 1947: Monsieur Wens Holds the Trump Cards by Émile-Georges De Meyst (dialogue)
- 1952: Bille de clown by Jean Wall
- 1952: Le Costaud des Batignolles by Guy Lacourt

=== Actor ===
- 1971: Léa l'hiver by Marc Monnet
