= Monsieur Leguignon, Signalman =

1952 film

- Directed by: Maurice Labro
- Written by: Claude Boissol; Jacques Emmanuel
- Produced by: Suzanne Goosens
- Starring: Yves Deniaud; Jane Marken; Bernard Lajarrige
- Cinematography: Jean Lehérissey
- Edited by: Monique Kirsanoff
- Music by: Francis Lopez
- Production companies: Latino Consortium Cinema; Productions Jason
- Distributed by: C.E.F.
- Release date: 9 May 1952 (France)
- Running time: 105 minutes
- Country: France
- Language: French

Monsieur Leguignon, Signalman (French: Monsieur Leguignon lampiste) is a 1952 French comedy film directed by Maurice Labro and starring Yves Deniaud, Jane Marken and Bernard Lajarrige. It was shot at the Boulogne Studios in Paris. The film's sets were designed by the art director Paul-Louis Boutié. It was based on a radio programme and was followed by a sequel Leguignon the Healer in 1954.

== Synopsis ==
A signalman employed by the SNCF constantly has to deal with difficult situations in spite of his well-meaning efforts. After a dispute with a group of children who lay claim to some treasure discovered in a dilapidated shack that he uses, the matter ends up in court.

== Cast ==
- Yves Deniaud as Diogène Leguignon
- Jane Marken as Mrs. Leguignon
- Bernard Lajarrige as Mr. Follenfant
- Pierre Larquey as Mr. Petitot
- Roland Armontel as Mr. Maltestu
- Christiane Barry as Louise
- Jean Carmet as Mr. Grosjean, policeman
- Jacques Emmanuel as Mr. Pabroc
- Paul Faivre as Mr. Paulin
- Pierre Magnier as Général de Saint Bouquet
- Henri Niel as M. Chadoul
- Jean Berton as M. Caïman
- Christian Argentin as Advocate
- Georges Baconnet as A local resident
- Paul Mercey as A local resident
- Louis de Funès as A local resident
- Pierre Havet as Le secrétaire de Pabroc
- Albert Duvaleix as Le président de la 9ème chambre correctionnelle
- Marcel Josz as Le président de la 11ème chambre correctionnelle
- Robert Lussac as Le président de la 13ème chambre correctionnelle
- Claude Boissol as Le substitut #1
- Jean Brunel as Le substitut #2
- Georges Tourreil as Le substitut #2
- Alain Chanu as reporter

== Bibliography ==
- Dyer, Richard & Vincendeau, Ginette. Popular European Cinema. Routledge, 2013.
- Rège, Philippe. Encyclopedia of French Film Directors, Volume 1. Scarecrow Press, 2009.
