= Aimé Barelli =

French musician (1917–1995)

Aimé Barelli (1 March 1917 Lantosque, France – 13 July 1995 Monaco) was a French jazz trumpeter, vocalist, and band leader.

At the beginning of the 1940s Barelli moved to Paris, where he worked with Fred Adison, Alix Combelle, André Ekyan, Maceo Jefferson, Raymond Legrand, Hubert Rostaing, and Raymond Wraskoff. He led his own group from 1943, which performed with Dizzy Gillespie in 1948. He played informally with Sidney Bechet and Charlie Parker in the late 1940s and with Django Reinhardt in 1952. Starting in 1966, he led his own ensemble in Monte Carlo. His daughter is singer Minouche Barelli.
