= Marie-Laurence =

Marie-Laurence is a feminine compound given name which may refer to:

- Marie-Laurence Jungfleisch (born 1990), German high jumper
- Marie-Laurence Josselyn Lassègue (born 1955), Haitian journalist, feminist and politician
- Marie-Laurence Quatrefages (1896–1976), French storekeeper and politician recognized as Righteous Among the Nations for saving a Jewish man from the Holocaust
- Marie Laurence de Rochefort, French socialite, television personality, and writer
