= Louis Poterat =

French lyricist

Louis Poterat (2 January 1901 – 6 January 1982) was a French lyricist.

== Career ==
Poterat was born in Troyes, Aube. He studied law, before turning to journalism. Poterat switched to a more commercial environment and began writing for local revues, where he developed his interest in song-writing. His forte was in adapting foreign-language works. He then joined the film company Pathé-Marconi and wrote a series of film scores.

By the end of the 1930s, Poterat had seen his first successes: adaptations of foreign-language songs into French. In 1938, he wrote J'attendrai, to music by the Italian melodist Dino Olivieri, which was a great hit for the singer Rina Ketty. The following year, on the eve of war, he wrote Sur les quais du vieux Paris, to music by the Austrian-born Jewish composer Ralph Erwin, which was the first hit for singer Lucienne Delyle, in 1939. The war would make wistful classics of both songs.

In 1943, he wrote Valse des regrets to Johannes Brahms's Waltz in A-flat major (number 15 in his Opus 39, Sixteen Waltzes for piano), which became a great success for Georges Guétary. Towards the end of the 1940s, he was frequently partnered with Henri Bourtayre, notably on the operetta 'Miss Cow-Boy' .

He died in Geneva.

== Sources ==
- This page is a translation of its French counterpart.
