= Maceo Jefferson =

American jazz musician

Maceo Buckingham Jefferson (July 14, 1898 in Beaufort, South Carolina – June 15, 1974 in Bridgeport, Connecticut) was an American jazz banjoist and guitarist.

Jefferson enlisted in the United States Navy during World War I, and following the war played in Norfolk, Virginia and then in Washington, DC with Roscoe Lee. Lee's band went on tour with Wilbur Sweatman in 1923, and following this Jefferson moved to New York City, playing with Lucille Hegamin and Ethel Waters and touring with the Blackbirds of 1928 revue. While in France he married a woman and stayed there until 1935, working with Leon Abbey, Louis Armstrong, and Arthur Briggs. After returning to New York, he worked with W.C. Handy and Willie "The Lion" Smith, then moved back to Paris in 1937, playing with Walter Kildare and with his own ensembles. He was imprisoned by the Nazis under the Vichy government during World War II, and in 1944 was released and sent back to the United States. He continued working in New York for a time, then relocated to Connecticut, where he increasingly focused on composition.
