= Nicole Besnard =

French actress (1928–2017)

- Born: 23 May 1928; Grenoble, Isère, France
- Died: 20 August 2017 (aged 89); Porspoder, Finistère, France
- Occupation: Actress
- Years active: 1949-1957 (film)

Nicole Besnard (1928–2017) was a French stage and film actress. She starred in several films during the 1950s before retiring.

== Selected filmography ==
- The Sinners (1949)
- Beauty and the Devil (1950)
- They Were Five (1952)
- Dortoir des grandes (1953)
- Naked in the Wind (1953)
- Sur le banc (1954)
- Leguignon the Healer (1954)
- The Big Flag (1954)
- The Blue Danube (1955)

== Bibliography ==
- Fritsche, Maria. Homemade Men In Postwar Austrian Cinema: Nationhood, Genre and Masculinity . Berghahn Books, 2013.
- Pym, John. Time Out Film Guide. Penguin Books, 2002.
