= Christian Duvaleix =

French actor

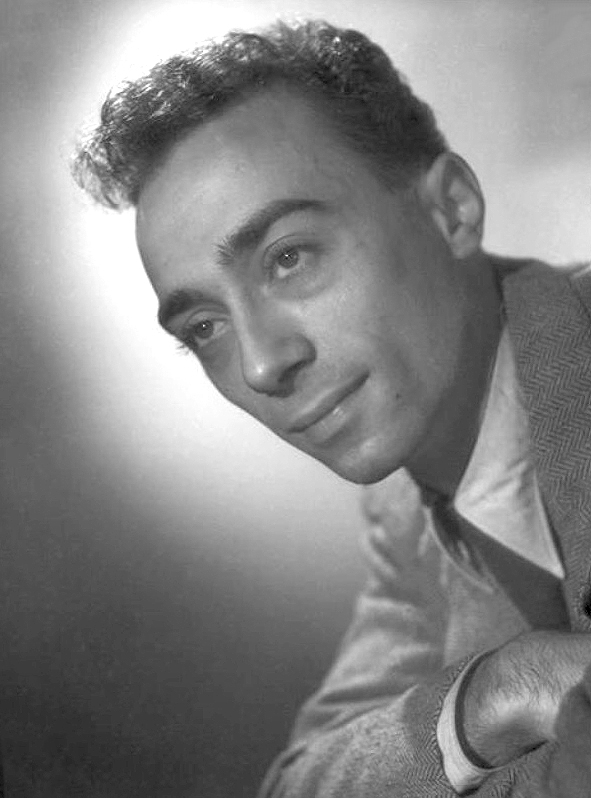
- Born: 13 March 1923; Tunis, French Tunisia
- Died: 28 July 1979 (aged 56); Garches, Hauts-de-Seine, France
- Occupation: Actor
- Years active: 1941-1979 (film & TV)

Christian Duvaleix (1923–1979) was a French stage and film actor. He was born in Tunis which was then part of French Tunisia, the son of Albert Duvaleix. He was a character actor appearing in a number of supporting roles. He was one of the members of the acting troupe Branquignols.

== Selected filmography ==
- Les aventures des pieds nickeles (1948)
- Doctor Laennec (1949)
- Branquignol (1949)
- The Cupid Club (1949)
- We Will All Go to Paris (1950)
- The King of the Bla Bla Bla (1951)
- No Vacation for Mr. Mayor (1951)
- Saluti e baci (1953)
- The Tour of the Grand Dukes (1953)
- Au diable la vertu (1954)
- The Pirates of the Bois de Boulogne (1954)
- Hello Smile ! (1956)
- Love in Jamaica (1957)
- Comme un cheveu sur la soupe (1957)
- Life Together (1958)
- La Tour, prends garde ! (1958)
- La Belle Américaine (1961)
- Isadora (1968)
- Le Plumard en folie (1974)
- Un linceul n'a pas de poches (1974)
- Parisian Life (1977)

== Bibliography ==
- Goble, Alan. The Complete Index to Literary Sources in Film. Walter de Gruyter, 1999.
- Rège, Philippe. Encyclopedia of French Film Directors, Volume 1. Scarecrow Press, 2009.
