= Leguignon the Healer =

1954 film

- Directed by: Maurice Labro
- Written by: Pierre Ferrari; Solange Térac
- Produced by: Suzanne Goosens
- Starring: Yves Deniaud; Jane Marken; Nicole Besnard
- Cinematography: Nikolai Toporkoff
- Edited by: Charles Bretoneiche
- Music by: Paul Durand
- Production company: Productions Jason
- Distributed by: Compagnie Européenne de Films
- Release date: 17 September 1954
- Running time: 105 minutes
- Country: France
- Language: French

Leguignon the Healer (French: Leguignon guérisseur) is a 1954 French comedy film directed by Maurice Labro and starring Yves Deniaud, Jane Marken and Nicole Besnard. The film's sets were designed by the art director Jean Douarinou. It was made as a sequel to the 1952 film Monsieur Leguignon, Signalman.

== Synopsis ==
Leguignon suddenly discovers that he has a magical gift for healing people. These powers cause deep resentment amongst the vested interests in his town such as the physician and some inhabitants hoping their wealthy relative will die. They manage to have him incarcerated in prison for two weeks, but when he is released he still faces pressure. To complicate matters his daughter is in love with the doctor's son.

== Cast ==
- Yves Deniaud as Diogène Leguignon
- Jane Marken as Mme Leguignon
- Nicole Besnard as Arlette Leguignon
- Michel Roux as Jean
- André Versini as Thierry Coq
- André Brunot as Dr. Martinet
- Louis Blanche as M. Coq
- Marcel Charvey as L'avocat général
- Max Dalban as L'épicier
- Paul Demange as Le pharmacien
- Max Elloy as Le facteur
- Paul Faivre as Le gardien chef
- Lucien Guervil as Paul Coq
- Janine Guiraud as La nièce
- Any Lorène as Louise
- Raoul Marco as Le vétérinaire
- Maryse Martin as La cliente
- Paul Mirvil as L'avocat
- André Philip as L'inspecteur du fisc
- Alexandre Rignault as Le chef du personnel
- Robert Burnier as Le président du tribunal
- Colette Mars as Rita
- André Gabriello as Le patron du bistrot

== Bibliography ==
- Dyer, Richard & Vincendeau, Ginette. Popular European Cinema. Routledge, 2013.
- Rège, Philippe. Encyclopedia of French Film Directors, Volume 1. Scarecrow Press, 2009.
