= Georges Combret =

French film director

- Born: 11 November 1906; Paris, France
- Died: 31 January 1998 (aged 91); Cannes, Alpes-Maritimes, France
- Occupations: Director, Producer, Writer
- Years active: 1950-1982 (film)

Georges Combret (1906–1998) was a French film director, producer and screenwriter.

== Biography ==
Born as Maurice Antonin Georges Combret in 1906, he would start work in the automobile industry. After the Second World War, he would find work in the film industry (starting as a production manager for the 1949 film La Ronde des Heures). During the 1970s, he would finance pornographic films and operated several theatres. He died after succumbing to injuries caused by a car in 1998.

== Selected filmography ==
- Duel in Dakar (1951)
- Music in the Head (1951)
- The Fighting Drummer (1953)
- Rasputin (1954)
- The Contessa's Secret (1954)
- The Whole Town Accuses (1956)
- Marie of the Isles (1959)
- Hot Frustrations (1965)
- Ring Around the World (1966)
- Fire of Love (1967)
- The Curse of Belphegor (1967)
- Hot and Naked (1974)
- Le plumard en folie (1974)

== Bibliography ==
- Hayward, Susan. French Costume Drama of the 1950s: Fashioning Politics in Film. Intellect Books, 2010. ISBN 978-1-84150-318-9.
