= Trevor Steedman =

British actor

- Born: 25 May 1954; Thurrock, Essex, England
- Died: 25 June 2016 (aged 62); London, England
- Occupation(s): Actor, stuntman
- Known for: Aliens (1986)

Trevor Steedman (25 May 1954 – 25 June 2016) was a British actor and stuntman best known for playing Private Wierzbowski in 1986's Aliens.

Born in Thurrock, Essex, Steedman began work as a stuntman in 1984, doing uncredited work on A View to a Kill and Doctor Who. In 1986, he appeared in James Cameron's Aliens, the sequel to 1979's Alien. Steedman played Private Wierzbowski, a member of the team of Marines who return to the planet the first film took place on, resulting in them being attacked by a horde of Xenomorphs. In the years after Aliens release, Steedman would actively take part in the Alien community, attending conventions and fan gatherings.

Steedman went on to do stunts in the James Bond films GoldenEye and Tomorrow Never Dies, as well as Superman IV: The Quest for Peace, Rob Roy, Snatch, Children of Men and Sherlock Holmes: A Game of Shadows

Steedman died of complications from a stroke on 25 June 2016 at the age of 62.

== Filmography ==
Year	Title	Role	Notes
1986	Aliens	Private Wierzbowski	
2000	Snatch	Bomber Harris	
2002	The Reckoning	Jealous Husband	
2007	Deadmeat	East End Heavy	
2013	The Ice Road	Narrator	(Final film role)
