= Maurice Labro =

French film director

- Born: 21 September 1910; Courbevoie
- Died: 23 March 1987 (aged 76); Paris
- Occupation: Film director
- Years active: 1947 - 1972

Maurice Labro (21 September 1910 – 23 March 1987) was a French film director.

== Filmography ==
- 1947: Les gosses mènent l'enquête
- 1948: Three Boys, One Girl
- 1949: The Heroic Monsieur Boniface
- 1950: Le Tampon du capiston
- 1951: The King of the Bla Bla Bla
- 1951: The Sleepwalker
- 1951: No Vacation for Mr. Mayor
- 1952 Monsieur Leguignon, Signalman
- 1953: Deux de l'escadrille
- 1953: Saluti e baci
- 1954: J'y suis, j'y reste (film)
- 1954: Ma petite folie
- 1954: Leguignon the Healer
- 1955: On déménage le colonel
- 1956: Villa sans souci
- 1957: Le colonel est de la revue
- 1957: Action immédiate
- 1959: Le fauve est lâché
- 1960: Les Canailles
- 1962: Le Gorille a mordu l'archevêque
- 1962: Jusqu'à plus soif (film)
- 1963: Le Captif (film)
- 1963: Blague dans le coin
- 1964: Coplan Takes Risks
- 1965: Code Name: Jaguar
- 1967: Casse-tête chinois pour le judoka
- 1972: La Feuille d'érable (TV serial)
