= Rasputin (1954 film) =

1954 film

- Directed by: Georges Combret
- Written by: Claude Boissol; Georges Combret
- Produced by: Georges Combret
- Starring: Pierre Brasseur; Isa Miranda; Renée Faure
- Cinematography: Pierre Petit
- Edited by: Germaine Fouquet
- Music by: Paul Durand
- Production companies: Italia Film; Radius Productions
- Distributed by: Warner Bros. Pictures (France)
- Release date: 19 July 1954
- Running time: 105 minutes
- Countries: France; Italy
- Language: French

Rasputin (French: Raspoutine) is a 1954 French-Italian historical drama film directed by Georges Combret and starring Pierre Brasseur, Isa Miranda and Renée Faure. It portrays the rise and fall of the Russian priest and courtier Grigori Rasputin.

The film's sets were designed by the art director Jean Douarinou.

== Plot ==
The muzhik Rasputin becomes the favorite of the court of the Tsar of Russia after curing the Tsar's son. He seduced the tsarina, he is accused of witchcraft, and a plot is organized.

== Cast ==
- Pierre Brasseur as Gregory Iefimovich Raspoutine
- Isa Miranda as La tsarine Alexandra
- Renée Faure as Véra
- Milly Vitale as Laura
- Jacques Berthier as Le prince Félix Youssoupoff / Youry
- Claude Laydu as Héliodore
- Denise Grey as La princesse Dikvona
- Micheline Francey as Anna Pracova
- Robert Berri as Le capitaine Soukoff
- Jean Wall as L'archimandrite Breham
- Raphaël Patorni as Le ministre Stumerof
- Michel Etcheverry as Pourlchkevitch
- Bruno Balp
- Nadine Bellaigue
- Charles Bouillaud as L'industriel Posinoff
- Maria Grazia Buccella
- Robert Burnier as Le tsar Nicolas II
- Pierre Cosson
- Germaine Delbat as La concierge
- Cécile Didier as La nourrice
- Ky Duyen as Le pédicure
- Cécile Eddy
- Richard Flagey as Dimitri
- Suzanne Grey as L'employée aux bains
- Jean Lanier as Le docteur
- Anne Laurent
- Robert Lombard as Boris Goulief
- Jean-Claude Maurice
- Alexandre Mihalesco
- René Pascal
- Roland Piguet
- Sacha Pitoëff as Le chef de la police
- Roger Saget as La basse
- Jean Thielment as Le garçon de bains
- Jacques Todescano
- Hélène Vallier as Une infirmière
- Jany Vallières as Une dame

== Bibliography ==
- Orio Caldiron & Matilde Hochkofler. Isa Miranda. Gremese Editore, 1978.
