= The Pirates of the Bois de Boulogne =

The Pirates of the Bois du Boulogne
- Directed by: Norbert Carbonnaux
- Written by: Norbert Carbonnaux; Robert Dhéry
- Produced by: Pierre Chichério
- Starring: Raymond Bussières; Annette Poivre; Christian Duvaleix
- Cinematography: Pierre Petit
- Edited by: Marinette Cadix
- Music by: Norbert Glanzberg
- Production company: Pécéfilms
- Distributed by: Sofradis
- Release date: 31 May 1954
- Running time: 77 minutes
- Country: France
- Language: French

The Pirates of the Bois de Boulogne (French: Les Corsaires du Bois de Boulogne) is a 1954 French comedy film directed by Norbert Carbonnaux and starring Raymond Bussières, Annette Poivre and Christian Duvaleix.

== Synopsis ==
A group of Parisians are very short of money and desperate. To attract attention they decide to become shipwrecked and make a raft from the wood of the Bois de Boulogne. Setting out from Saint Tropez they do not make it very far across the sea, but their plan is ultimately successful.

== Cast ==
- Raymond Bussières as Hector Colomb, street singer
- Annette Poivre as Adèle, singer of streets
- Christian Duvaleix as Cyprien, street singer
- Denise Grey as Mrs Grossac, wife of industrialist
- Véra Norman as Caroline Grossac, the girl
- Jean Ozenne as Marcel Grossac, the industrialist
- Sophie Sel as a servant of "Grossac"
- Jess Hahn as the American marine
- Mario David as the athlete
- Jacques Ary as gendarme
- Christian Brocard as the news vendor (uncredited)
- Laure Paillette as the patroness of café (uncredited)
- Georges Lautner as amateur radio (uncredited)
- Louis de Funès as the commissar (uncredited)
- Olga Sminsky (uncredited)
- Monique Dutot (uncredited)
- Antonio Longard (uncredited)
