= Paul Durand (composer) =

French composer (1907–1977)

- Born: 28 January 1907; Sète, Hérault, France
- Died: 25 January 1977 (aged 69); Louveciennes, Yvelines, France
- Occupation: Composer
- Years active: 1943–1962 (film)

Paul Durand (28 January, 1907 – 25 September, 1977) was a French composer. He scored a number of films during the postwar era in France. He adapted the tune of "Bolero" for the 1950 hit song All My Love.

== Selected filmography ==
- My Last Mistress (1943)
- La vie de plaisir (1944)
- Scandal on the Champs-Élysées (1949)
- The Girl from Maxim's (1950)
- No Vacation for Mr. Mayor (1951)
- Rasputin (1954)
- The Contessa's Secret (1954)
- Leguignon the Healer (1954)
- Sherlock Holmes (1954)
- Mademoiselle from Paris (1955)
- The Whole Town Accuses (1956)
- Paris, Palace Hotel (1956)
- Foreign Intrigue (1956)
- A Kiss for a Killer (1957)
- The Cow and I (1959)
- Le Saint mène la danse (1960)
- The Old Guard (1960)
- Ravishing (1960)
- Un soir sur la plage (1961)
- Le captif (1962)

== Bibliography ==
- Tyler, Don. Hit Songs, 1900-1955: American Popular Music of the Pre-Rock Era. McFarland, 2007.
