= Henri Contet =

French composer (1904–1998)

- Born: 8 May 1904; Anost, Saône-et-Loire, France
- Died: 15 April 1998 (aged 93); 7th arrondissement of Paris, Île-de-France, France
- Occupation: Composer
- Known for: Lyricist for Édith Piaf
- Honours: Legion of Honor (1956)

Henri Contet (1904–1998) was a French engineer, film critic, actor, lyricist and journalist. He was born on 8 May 1904 in Anost (Saône-et-Loire) and died on 15 April 1998 in Paris' seventh arrondissement. He wrote over 1,000 songs for singers including Édith Piaf, Yves Montand, Mireille Mathieu and Ute Lemper. He was awarded the Legion of honor in 1956.
