= Maxime Fabert =

French actor (1898-1978)

- Born: Robert Émile Jaillon; 7 November 1898; 11th arrondissement of Paris
- Died: 1 October 1978 (aged 79); 14th arrondissement of Paris
- Occupation(s): Stage and film actor, theatre managing director
- Years active: 1923 – 1970

Maxime Fabert, real name Robert Émile Jaillon, (7 November 1898 – 1 October 1978) was a French stage and film actor. Maxime Fabert managed the Theater of the Comédie-Wagram from 1946 to 1962.

== Filmography ==
- 1932 : The Nude Woman by Jean-Paul Paulin as Tabourot
- 1933 : Une vie perdue by Raymond Rouleau
- 1935 : Les yeux noirs by Victor Tourjansky as a guest
- 1937 : The Red Dancer by Jean-Paul Paulin
- 1937 : Double Crime in the Maginot Line by Félix Gandera as Gunsmith
- 1937 : Police mondaine by Michel Bernheim and Christian Chamborant
- 1937 : Tamara by Félix Gandera and Jean Delannoy as Padiloff
- 1938 : L'Ange que j'ai vendu by Michel Bernheim
- 1938 : Barnabé by Alexander Esway
- 1938 : Métropolitain by Maurice Cam
- 1938 : Trois artilleurs à l'opéra by André Chotin
- 1941 : Ce n'est pas moi by Jacques de Baroncelli
- 1941 : Moulin Rouge by André Hugon as le commissaire
- 1942 : Fever by Jean Delannoy as Charles
- 1942 : The Guardian Angel by Jacques de Casembroot as the gardener
- 1942 : Coup de feu dans la nuit by Robert Péguy as a journalist
- 1942 : The Trump Card by Jacques Becker as the suspicious jeweler
- 1942 : The Lost Woman by Jean Choux as le contrôleur
- 1942 : Forte tête by Léon Mathot as the gambler
- 1942 : Haut-le-Vent by Jacques de Baroncelli
- 1942 : L'Honorable Catherine by Marcel L'Herbier as a guest
- 1942 : Huit hommes dans un château by Richard Pottier as the drunkard
- 1943 : Monsieur des Lourdines by Pierre de Hérain as Saint-Crécy
- 1943 : Coup de tête by René Le Hénaff
- 1944 : Le Merle blanc by Jacques Houssin as Mr. Pénitent
- 1944 : St. Val's Mystery by René Le Hénaff
- 1948 : Les Aventures des Pieds-Nickelés by Marcel Aboulker as Dubarreau
- 1947 : One Night at the Tabarin by Karl Lamac as le notaire
- 1948 : L'assassin est à l'écoute by Raoul André
- 1949 : Amour et Compagnie by Gilles Grangier as a member of the executive office
- 1949 : Forbidden to the Public by Alfred Pasquali as Robert
- 1949 : The Unexpected Voyager by Jean Stelli
- 1950 : Avalanche by Raymond Sagard
- 1950 : Sweet Madness by Jean-Paul Paulin
- 1950 : Les Mémoires de la vache Yolande by Ernst Neubach as le commissaire
- 1953 : Ma petite folie by Maurice Labro
- 1955 : Deadlier Than the Male by Julien Duvivier as le patron de l'hôtel du Charolais
- 1956 : Bonsoir Paris, bonjour l'amour by Ralph Baum and H. Leitner
- 1958 : Les Motards by Jean Laviron as an official
- 1959 : Les Héritiers by Jean Laviron as Roland
- 1967 : The Most Beautiful Month by Guy Blanc as Julien
- 1970 : Raphael, or The Debauched One by Michel Deville as the count

== Theatre ==
- 1923 : Liliom by Ferenc Molnár, directed by Georges Pitoëff, Comédie des Champs-Élysées
- 1923 : La Journée des aveux by Georges Duhamel, directed by Georges Pitoëff, Théâtre des Champs-Élysées
- 1923 : L'Indigent by Charles Vildrac, directed by Georges Pitoëff, Comédie des Champs-Élysées
- 1923 : La Petite Baraque by Alexander Blok, directed by Georges Pitoëff, Comédie des Champs-Élysées
- 1923 : Amédée et les messieurs en rang by Jules Romains, directed by Louis Jouvet, Comédie des Champs-Élysées
- 1924 : Celui qui reçoit les gifles by Leonid Andreyev, directed by Georges Pitoëff, Comédie des Champs-Élysées
- 1933 : Le Locataire du troisième sur la cour by Jerome K. Jerome, directed by Charles Edmond, Théâtre des Arts
- 1936 : Lady Warner a disparu by Paul Chambard, Théâtre des Deux Masques
- 1936 : Que personne ne sorte by Fenn Sherie and Ingram D'Abbes, adaptation Paul Chambard, Théâtre des Deux Masques
- 1937 : Deux de la police (Trois de la police) by Pierre Chambard and Marcel Dubois, directed by Max de Rieux, Théâtre des Deux Masques
- 1937 : La Nuit du 7 by Michel Dulud, directed by Philippe Hersent, Théâtre des Capucines
- 1938 : Les Deux Madame Carroll by Marguerite Veiller, Théâtre des Capucines
- 1939 : C'est moi qui ai tué le Comte by Max Vierbo and Marcel Dubois after Alec Coppel, directed by Maurice Lagrenée, Théâtre de la Potinière
- 1943 : Rêves à forfait by Marc-Gilbert Sauvajon, Théâtre Daunou
- 1944 : Monseigneur by Michel Dulud, Théâtre Daunou
- 1945 : Un ami viendra ce soir by Yvan Noé and Jacques Companeez, directed by Jean Wall, Théâtre de Paris
- 1947 : Une mort sans importance by Yvan Noé and A. Linou, directed by Yvan Noé, Théâtre de la Potinière
- 1948 : Interdit au public by Roger Dornès and Jean Marsan, directed by Alfred Pasquali, Comédie-Wagram
- 1955 : Ce diable d'ange by Pierre Destailles and Charles Michel, directed by Georges Vitaly, Comédie-Wagram
- 1956 : Ce soir je dîne chez moi by Clare Kummer, directed by Christian-Gérard, Comédie-Wagram
- 1959 : Mon ange by Solange Térac, directed by René Clermont, Comédie-Wagram
- 1961 : Remue-ménage by Pierre Leloir, directed by Jean Marchat, Comédie-Wagram
- 1962 : La Vénus de Milo by Jacques Deval, directed by Pierre Mondy, Théâtre du Gymnase
- 1963 : La Vénus de Milo by Jacques Deval, directed by Pierre Mondy, Théâtre des Célestins
- 1967 : L'erreur est juste by Jean Paxet, directed by Christian-Gérard, Théâtre des Arts
