= Robert Manuel (actor) =

French actor and film director

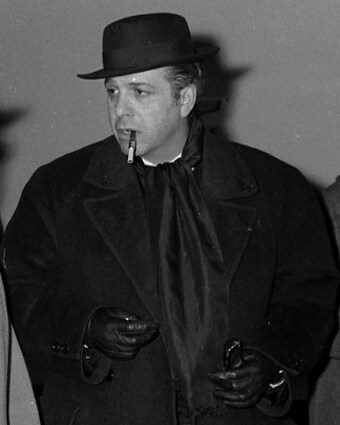
- Manuel in 1962
- Born: Robert Emmanuel Bloch; 16 September 1916; Paris, France
- Died: 8 December 1995 (aged 79); Saint-Cloud, France
- Occupations: Actor, film director
- Years active: 1935–1993

Robert Manuel (7 September 1916 – 8 December 1995) was a 20th-century French stage, television, and film actor, and film director.

== Filmography ==
- 1935: La Petite Sauvage (by Jean de Limur)
- 1937: Salonique, nid d'espions (by Georg Wilhelm Pabst) - un invité au consulat
- 1938: Orage (by Marc Allégret) - Gilbert
- 1938: La Marseillaise (by Jean Renoir)
- 1938: Le Drame de Shanghaï (by Georg Wilhelm Pabst) - Le client attaqué
- 1939: Jeunes filles en détresse (by Georg Wilhelm Pabst) - Robert (uncredited)
- 1946: The Captain (by Robert Vernay) - Le comte Hercule de Nesle
- 1946: Comédie avant Molière (by Jean Tedesco) (Short)
- 1950: The Paris Waltz (by Marcel Achard) - José Dupuis
- 1955: Le Fils de Caroline chérie (by Jean Devaivre) - Le Roi Joseph
- 1955: Napoléon (by Sacha Guitry) - Joseph Bonaparte (uncredited)
- 1955: Rififi (Du rififi chez les hommes) (by Jules Dassin) - Mario Ferrati
- 1955: Lord Rogue (by André Haguet) - Marcouski
- 1955: Si Paris nous était conté (by Sacha Guitry) - Gustave Flaubert
- 1956: Voici le temps des assassins (by Julien Duvivier) - Mario Bonnacorsi
- 1956: It Happened in Aden (by Michel Boisrond) - Zafarana
- 1957: Comme un cheveu sur la soupe (by Maurice Regamey) - Tony
- 1957: Judicial Police (by Maurice de Canonge) - Le commissaire Dupuis
- 1958: Le désordre et la nuit (by Gilles Grangier) - Blasco
- 1958: Le Gorille vous salue bien (by Bernard Borderie) - Casa
- 1958: Life Together (by Clément Duhour) - Georges
- 1958: Le Bourgeois gentilhomme (by Jean Meyer) - Le maître de musique
- 1959: Croquemitoufle (by Claude Barma) - Thomas Desjardins
- 1960: Certains l'aiment froide (by Jean Bastia) - Luigi Valmorin, dit 'Valmorino'
- 1960: Recours en grâce (by Laslo Benedek) - Le forain
- 1960: La Dragée haute (by Jean Kerchner)
- 1960: Candide ou l'optimisme au XXe siècle (by Norbert Carbonnaux) - Tous les officiers allemands / German Officer
- 1961: Un clair de lune à Maubeuge (by Jean Cherasse) - Charlie Bank, le directeur de Superdisco
- 1961: 21 rue Blanche à Paris (by Quincy Albicoco et Claude-Yvon Leduc) (documentaire)
- 1963: Une blonde comme ça (by Jean Jabely) - Commissaire Clancy
- 1963: The Threepenny Opera (by Wolfgang Staudte) - First Hangman
- 1963: Les Femmes d'abord (by Raoul André) - L'inspecteur principal Viou
- 1963: Vous souvenez-vous de Paco ? (Rififi en la ciudad) (by Jesus Franco) - Puig
- 1964: La Tulipe noire (by Christian Jaque) - Prince Alexandre de Grasillach de Morvan Lobo
- 1964: Une souris chez les hommes (by Jacques Poitrenaud) - Léon Dufour
- 1964: Les Siffleurs – (Viheltäjät) (by Eino Ruutsalo) - Robert Manuel
- 1965: Cent briques et des tuiles (by Pierre Grimblat) - Palmoni
- 1965: Coplan FX 18 (by Riccardo Freda) - Hartung
- 1967: L'homme qui trahit la mafia (by Charles Gérard) - Le chef de brigade des stupéfiants
- 1969: Les Gros Malins (by Raymond Leboursier) - Le ministre
- 1974: La Fille d'Amérique – (The crazy American girl) (by David Newton) - Gigi
- 1978: Judith Therpauve (by Patrice Chéreau) - Droz
- 1982: Le Bourgeois gentilhomme (by Roger Coggio) - Le maître d'armes
- 1983: La vie est un roman (by Alain Resnais) - Georges Leroux
- 1984: The Razor's Edge (by John Byrum) - Albert
- 1987: Vent de panique (by Bernard Stora) - Machavert
- 1991: À demain (by Didier Martiny) - Tremineras
- 1993: The Young Indiana Jones Chronicles (episode Paris, September 1908) (by René Manzor) - Henri Rousseau (final appearance)
