= Eleonora Vargas =

Italian film actress

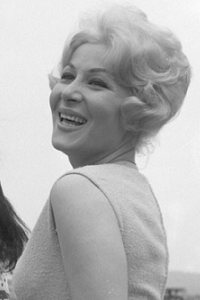
- Vargas in 1959
- Born: Rome
- Occupation: Film actress

Eleonora Vargas is an Italian film actress.

She played Prisca in Gladiator of Rome (1962), and Horpina in Invasion 1700 (1962). She appeared in Il terrore dei barbari, The Hanging Woman (1972), by José Luis Merino, and Dinamite Jack (1960), by Jean Bastia and starring Fernandel and Adrienne Corri.

== Filmography ==
- The Hanging Woman (1973)
- Agguato sul Bosforo (1969)
- Il suo nome gridava vendetta (1968)
- Seven Pistols for a Massacre (1967) as Judith
- Gladiator of Rome (1962) as Tullia Prisca
- Invasion 1700 (1962) as Horpina
- Dynamite Jack (1961) as Dolores
- Goliath and the Barbarians (1959)
- La ragazza di Via Veneto (1955)
