= Dynamite Jack =

1961 French film by Jean Bastia

- Directed by: Jean Bastia
- Written by: Jack Ary; Jacques Emmanuel; Jean Manse; Jean Bastia
- Produced by: Jacques-Paul Bertrand
- Starring: Fernandel; Eleonora Vargas; Lucien Raimbourg
- Cinematography: Roger Hubert
- Edited by: Jacques Desagneaux
- Music by: Pascal Bastia; Jean-Pierre Landreau
- Production companies: Les Productions Jacques-Paul Bertrand; Federal International Films; Variety Film; Cineraid
- Distributed by: Société Nouvelle de Cinématographie
- Release date: 3 November 1961
- Running time: 103 minutes
- Countries: France; Italy
- Language: French

Dynamite Jack is a 1961 French-Italian comedy western film directed by Jean Bastia and starring Fernandel, Eleonora Vargas and Lucien Raimbourg. A Frenchman moves to Arizona in the Wild West era, only to find he is the exact image of the notorious local outlaw Dynamite Jack.

The film's sets were designed by the art director Robert Giordani.

== Cast ==
- Fernandel as Dynamite Jack / Antoine Espérandieu
- Eleonora Vargas as Dolores
- Lucien Raimbourg as Sheriff Scotty
- Jess Hahn as Sergeant Bob
- Adrienne Corri as Pegeen O'Brien
- Georges Lycan as Louis le Borgne
- Claude d'Yd as Charlie McGregor
- Todd Martin as Henri
- Viviane Méry as Jeanne
- Marcelle Féry as Loulou
- Joe Warfield as Michel
- Colin Drake as Larry Schultz
- Carl Studer as Barman Fred

== Bibliography ==
- Walker, Janet. Westerns: Films through History. Routledge, 2013.
