= Tintin (character) =

Comic character by Belgian cartoonist Hergé

- Tintin and his dog Snowy in a panel of Tintin in the Land of the Soviets, their first appearance, by Hergé

Publication information
- Publisher: Casterman (Belgium)
- First appearance: Tintin in the Land of the Soviets (1929)
- Created by: Hergé

In-story information
- Partnerships: List of main characters

Tintin (/ˈtɪntɪn/) is the titular protagonist of The Adventures of Tintin, the comic series by Belgian cartoonist Hergé. The character was created in 1929 and introduced in Le Petit Vingtième, a weekly youth supplement to the Belgian newspaper Le Vingtième Siècle. Appearing as a young man with a round face and quiff hairstyle, Tintin is depicted as a precocious, multitalented reporter who travels the world with his dog Snowy.

Since his inception in the early 20th century, Tintin has remained a popular literary figure with statues and commemorative murals of the character seen throughout Belgium. In addition to the original comic series, Tintin has appeared in numerous plays, radio shows, television shows, and feature films, including the Steven Spielberg-directed film The Adventures of Tintin (2011).

As of 1 January 2025, Tintin and other characters appearing in the original 1929 French comic strips entered the public domain in the United States. (Note: See Title 17, Chapter 1, Section 104 and 104A of the United States Code) (Note: See Title 17, Chapter 3, Section 304 of the United States Code) (Note: See Circular 38B from the United States Copyright Office) Tintin remains under copyright in his original country, Belgium, and other countries utilizing terms that expire after a set period of time following the author's death. (Note: The original author, Hergé, died in 1983. For countries that follow Life+ rules this means that that Tintin is not yet public domain. The most common dates for Hergé-created Tintin works to enter the public domain are 2034 and 2054 for life+50 and life+70 rules, respectively.)

== History ==
=== Influences ===
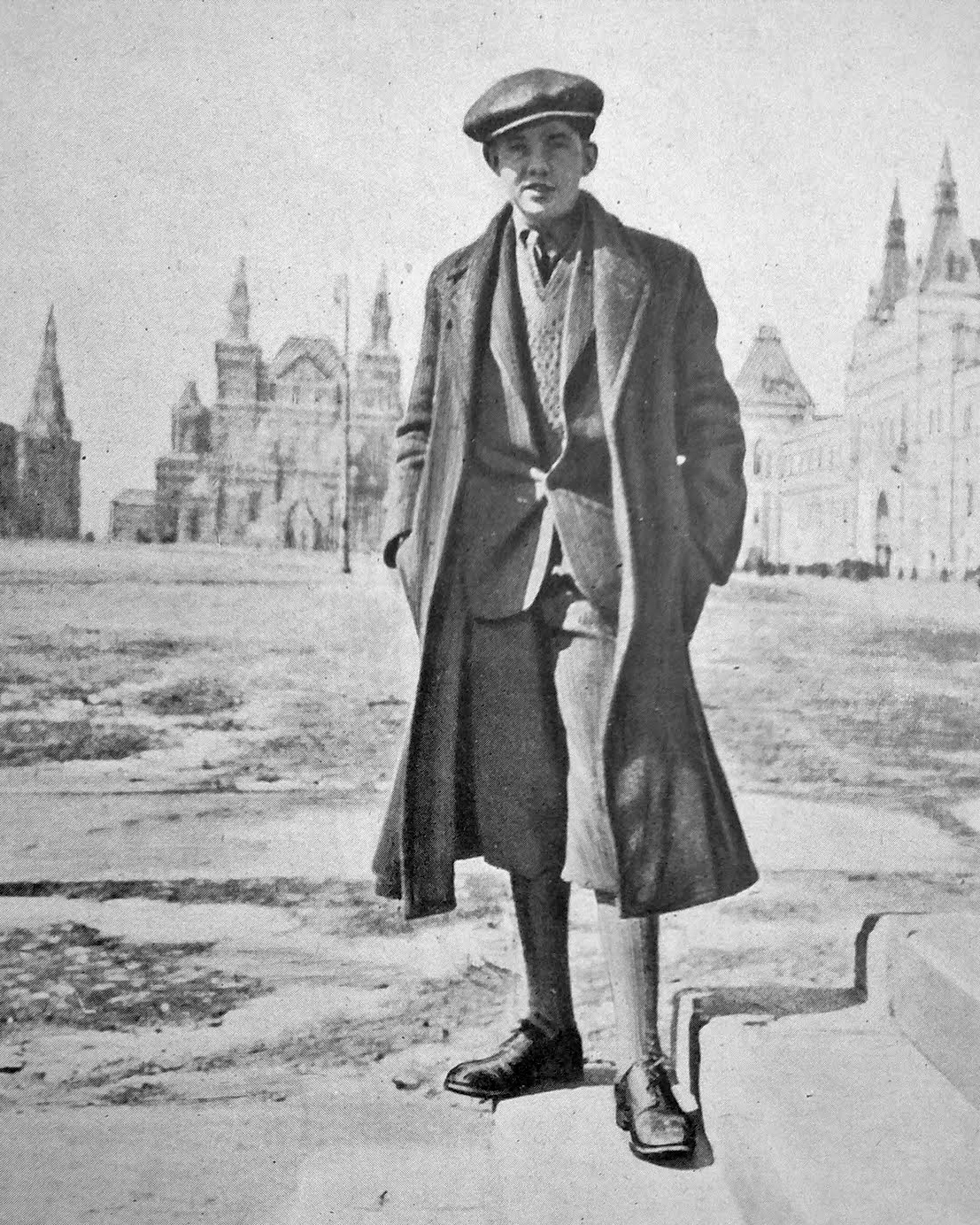
Palle Huld, during his trip around the world in 1928, almost certainly influenced Hergé to create Tintin.

Hergé (Note: Georges Remi decided to reverse his "G.R." initials in 1924, leading to his pen name "Hergé".) biographer Pierre Assouline noted that "Tintin had a prehistory", being influenced by a variety of sources that Hergé had encountered throughout his life. Hergé noted that during his early schooling in the midst of World War I, when Belgium was under German occupation, he had drawn pictures in the margins of his school workbooks of an unnamed young man battling the Boches (a slang term for Germans). He later commented that these drawings depicted a brave and adventurous character using his intelligence and ingenuity against opponents. None of these early drawings survive.

Hergé was also influenced by the physical appearance and mannerisms of his younger brother Paul, who had a round face and a quiff hairstyle. In search of adventure, Paul later joined the Belgian Army, receiving jeers from fellow officers when the source of Hergé's visual inspiration became obvious. Hergé later stated that in his youth, "I watched him a lot; he entertained me and fascinated me... It makes sense that Tintin took on his character, gestures, poses. He had a way of moving and a physical presence that must have inspired me without my knowing it. His gestures stayed in my mind. I copied them clumsily, without meaning to or even knowing I was doing it; it was him I was drawing."

A few years after young Hergé joined Scouting, (Note: Of his childhood, Hergé said, "I have memories, but these do not begin to brighten, to become coloured until the moment when I discovered Scouting.") he became the unofficial artist for his Scout troop and drew a Boy Scout character for the national magazine Le Boy Scout Belge. This young man, whom he named Totor, travelled the globe and righted wrongs, all without ruffling his Scout honour. As was the format for European comics at the time, the early drawings of Totor merely illustrated the story; the text that appeared below the drawings is what propelled the action. Years later, Totor would be very much in Hergé's mind; his new comics character would be, Hergé himself later said, "the little brother of Totor ... keeping the spirit of a Boy Scout." Assouline would describe Totor as "a sort of trial run" for Tintin. Novelist and biographer Harry Thompson simply stated that Totor would "metamorphose" into Tintin.

Literary influences have been observed. Benjamin Rabier and Fred Isly published an illustrated story in 1898 titled Tintin-Lutin ("Tintin the Goblin"), in which they featured a small goblin boy named Tintin, who had a rounded face and quiff. Hergé agreed that Rabier's manner of drawing animals had influenced him, although he swore that he was unaware of the existence of Tintin-Lutin until one of his readers later informed him of the similarity. In 1907, Gaston Leroux (author of The Phantom of the Opera) created the character Joseph Rouletabille, a young journalist and amateur detective. Marcel Priollet wrote a series of adventures in 1910 titled Tintin, le petit Parisien.

Hergé, an avid news reader, would have been aware of the activities of a number of popular journalists well known in Belgium, notably Joseph Kessel but especially Albert Londres, one of the creators of investigative journalism. Almost certainly another influence was Palle Huld, a 15-year-old Danish Boy Scout who travelled around the world in 1928 and wrote about his adventures the following year. Robert Sexé, a French motorcycle photojournalist, travelled and wrote about the Soviet Union, the Belgian Congo, and the United States—immediately followed by Tintin's adventures. Years later, when Hergé was asked who inspired Tintin, he answered, "Tintin c'est moi."

Influenced by the new style of American comics, (Note: Léon Degrelle, foreign correspondent of Le Vingtième Siècle, later Rexist leader, protégé of Hitler, and author of fr:Tintin mon copain, was acquainted with Hergé and sent him "local newspapers in which there were American strip cartoons. That's how I came across my first comics." (Hergé, in 1975)) Hergé created his new comic in the form of a strip cartoon with dialogue in speech bubbles (Note: Belgian readers were not acquainted with the American strip cartoons that Hergé had recently become familiar with, so most had never seen speech bubbles before. "Hergé virtually pioneered their use in Europe," Harry Thompson points out. "Readers reacted to the early works and deeds of Tintin as if they were carved on tablets of stone.") and drawings that carried the story. Young reporter Tintin would have the investigative acumen of Londres, the travelling abilities of Huld, and the high moral standing of Totor, the Boy Scout travelling reporter with whom Hergé identified.

=== Early development ===
The idea for the character of Tintin and the sort of adventures that would befall him came to me, I believe, in five minutes, the moment I first made a sketch of the figure of this hero: that is to say, he had not haunted my youth nor even my dreams. Although it's possible that as a child I imagined myself in the role of a sort of Tintin.

— Hergé, 15 November 1966.

Tintin appeared after Hergé got his first job as a photographic reporter and cartoonist (Note: "I took a grand total of two photos—one of my cat and another of a friend riding a bicycle." —Hergé, December 1987, Radio-Brussels, 4 March 1942) working at the Catholic newspaper Le Vingtième Siècle ("The Twentieth Century"), where his director challenged him to create a new serialised comic for its Thursday supplement for young readers, Le Petit Vingtième ("The Little Twentieth"). In the edition 30 December 1928 of the satirical weekly newspaper Le Sifflet (a parallel publication to Le Vingtième Siècle), Hergé included two cartoon gags with word balloons, in which he depicted a boy and a little white dog. Abbe Wallez thought that these characters could be developed further, and asked Hergé to use characters like these for an adventure that could be serialised in Le Petit Vingtième. Hergé agreed, and an image of Tintin and Snowy first appeared in the youth supplement on 4 January 1929, in an advert for the upcoming series. Hergé would later insist that Tintin would only be "born" on 10 January 1929, in the first episode of Tintin in the Land of the Soviets.

Hergé admitted that he did not take Tintin seriously in the early Adventures, explaining simply that he "put the character to the test"; that he created Tintin "as a joke between friends, forgotten the next day." Hergé biographer Benoît Peeters noted that Tintin was "supremely Belgian" in his characteristics, a view echoed by Assouline, who deemed all of the protagonists of the early Adventures "very Belgian". Hergé himself commented: "my early works are books by a young Belgian filled with the prejudices and ideas of a Catholic, they are books that could have been written by any Belgian in my situation. They are not very intelligent, I know, and do me no honour: they are 'Belgian' books." Peeters ultimately considers the early Tintin to be "incoherent ... a Sartre-esque character", an "existentialist before the term had been coined", going on to observe that Tintin exists only through his actions, is just a narrative vehicle, having "no surname, no family, hardly anything of a face, and the mere semblance of a career."

== Characterisation ==
=== Description ===
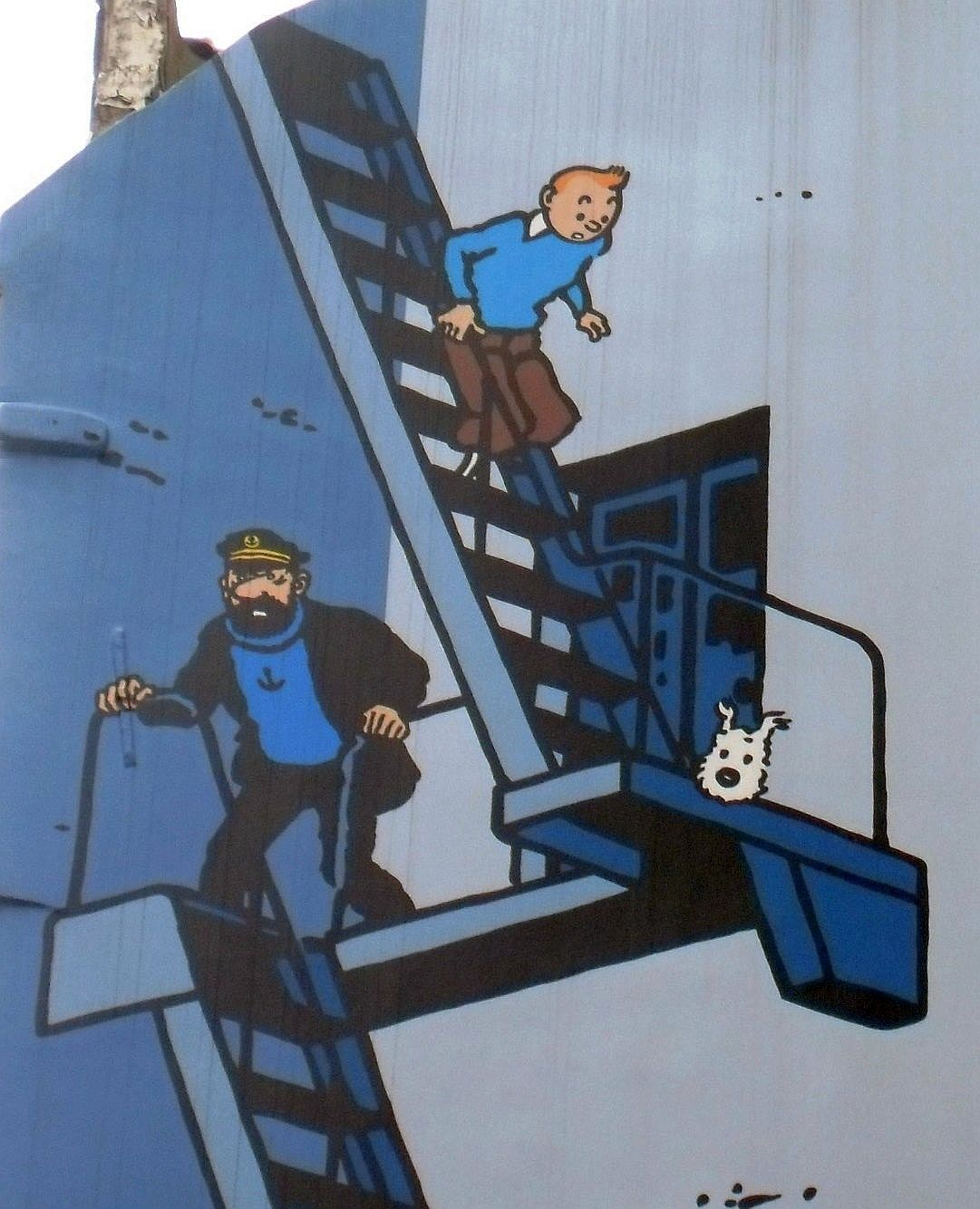
Tintin, Snowy and Captain Haddock depicted on a wall in the city of Brussels

The image of Tintin—a round-faced young man running with a white Fox Terrier by his side—is easily one of the most recognisable visual icons of the twentieth century. Hergé created Tintin as a young, blonde Belgian who is a native of Brussels, visualizing Hergé's values of conservative values and traditional norms. (Note: "A native of Brussels as opposed to Belgian", says Assouline.) Assouline deemed Tintin to be middle-class, which he considers one of the few traits that the character had in common with Hergé. In his first appearance, Tintin is dressed in a long travelling coat and hat, a few pages later adopting his plus fours, check suit, black socks, and Eton collar. (Note: Hergé remembers a Canadian student at his college who was teased for wearing plus fours and Argyll socks; certainly an inspiration.) At first, the famous quiff (or tuft of hair) is plastered to Tintin's forehead, but during a particularly vigorous car chase in what became page 8 of the printed volume, his quiff is out and remains so. By the time he arrives in Chicago for his third adventure, both Hergé and his readers feel they know Tintin well, and he was to change little in either appearance or dress. Hergé was once asked by interviewer Numa Sadoul how the character Tintin developed; he replied, "He practically did not evolve. Graphically, he remained an outline. Look at his features: his face is a sketch, a formula." (Note: Should the reader examine any image of Tintin in his comic strips, they "will see that Tintin always moves from left to right, advancing the story. Obstacles come at him from right to left, and when he moves in that direction he is usually experiencing a setback." (Harry Thompson, adding that 1934's Cigars of the Pharaoh had to be redrawn in 1955 as it had not adhered to this formula.)) This view was echoed by Assouline: "Tintin was as uncomplicated as the story line".

Hergé never explained why he chose Tintin as the character's name, stating that it has no inherent meaning. He had previously made use of alliteration with the name of his previous character, Totor. Michael Farr believes that "Tintin" is probably the character's surname because other characters, such as his landlady, occasionally refer to him as Mr. Tintin (as printed on his doorbell). Assouline asserted that it cannot be his surname because he lacks a family, believing that Hergé had adopted it because "it sounded heroic, clear, and cheerful" as well as being easy to remember.

Tintin's age is never specified. Throughout the Adventures, published over 50 years, he remained youthful. "Tintin was born at fifteen", says Assouline. Hergé commented, "For me, Tintin hasn't aged. What age do I give him? I don't know ... 17? In my judgement, he was 14 or 15 when I created him, Boy Scout, and he has practically not moved on. Suppose he put on 3 or 4 years in 40 years ... Good, work out an average, 15 and 4 equals 19."

=== Occupation ===
From Tintin's first adventure, he lives the life of a campaigning reporter. He is sent to the Soviet Union, where he writes his editor a dispatch. He travels to the Belgian Congo, where he engages in photojournalism. When he travels to China in The Blue Lotus, the Shanghai News features the front-page headline, "Tintin's Own Story". In The Broken Ear, with notebook in hand, Tintin questions the director of the Museum of Ethnography over a recent theft. Sometimes Tintin is the one being interviewed, such as when a radio reporter presses him for details, "In your own words." But aside from these few examples, Tintin is never actually seen consulting with his editor or delivering a story.

As his adventures continue, Tintin is less often seen reporting and is more often seen as a detective, pursuing his investigative journalism from his apartment at No. 26 Labrador Street. Other characters refer to him as Sherlock Holmes, as he has a sharp intellect, an eye for detail, and powers of deduction. Like Holmes, he is occasionally a master of disguise, and in Rastapopoulos even has an archenemy.

Tintin's occupation drifts further in later adventures, abandoning all pretence of reporting news and instead making news in his role of explorer. Clearly unencumbered with financial preoccupations, after Red Rackham's Treasure he is ensconced as a permanent house guest in the stately Marlinspike Hall with retired mariner Captain Haddock and the scientist Professor Calculus. Tintin occupies all of his time with his friends, exploring the bottom of the sea, the tops of the mountains, and the surface of the Moon (sixteen years before astronauts Neil Armstrong and Buzz Aldrin). Through it all, Tintin finds himself cast in the role of international social crusader, sticking up for the underdog and looking after those less fortunate than himself.

=== Skills and abilities ===
From the first volume onward, Hergé depicted Tintin as being adept at driving or fixing any mechanical vehicle that he comes across. Given the opportunity, Tintin is at ease driving any automobile, has driven a moon tank, and is comfortable with every aspect of aviation. He is also a skilled radio operator with knowledge of Morse code. He packs a solid punch to a villain's jaw when necessary, demonstrates impressive swimming skills, and is a crack shot. He proves himself a capable engineer and scientist during his adventure to the Moon. He is also an excellent athlete, in outstanding condition, able to walk, run, and swim long distances. Hergé summarized Tintin's abilities thusly: "a hero without fear and beyond reproach." More than anything else, Tintin is a quick thinker and an effective diplomat. He is simply an all-rounder, good at almost everything, which is what Hergé himself would have liked to be.

=== Personality ===
Tintin's personality evolved as Hergé wrote the series. Peeters relates that in the early Adventures, Tintin's personality was "incoherent", in that he was "[s]ometimes foolish and sometimes omniscient, pious to the point of mockery and then unacceptably aggressive", ultimately just serving as a "narrative vehicle" for Hergé's plots. Hergé biographer Pierre Assouline notes that in the early Adventures, Tintin shows "little sympathy for humanity". Assouline describes the character as "obviously celibate, excessively virtuous, chivalrous, brave, a defender of the weak and oppressed, never looks for trouble but always finds it."

Michael Farr deems Tintin to be an intrepid young man of high moral standing, with whom his audience can identify. His rather neutral personality permits a balanced reflection of the evil, folly, and foolhardiness that surrounds him, allowing the reader to assume Tintin's position within the story rather than merely following the adventures of a strong protagonist. Tintin's representation enhances this aspect, with comics expert Scott McCloud noting that the combination of Tintin's iconic, neutral personality and Hergé's "unusually realistic", signature ligne claire ("clear line") style "allows the reader to mask themselves in a character and safely enter a sensually stimulating world."

To the other characters, Tintin is honest, decent, compassionate, and kind. He is also modest and self-effacing, which Hergé also was, and is the most loyal of friends, which Hergé strove to be. The reporter does have vices, becoming too tipsy before facing the firing squad (in The Broken Ear) or too angry when informing Captain Haddock that he nearly cost them their lives (in Explorers on the Moon). However, as Michael Farr observes, Tintin has "tremendous spirit" and, in Tintin in Tibet, is appropriately given the name Great Heart. By turns, Tintin is innocent, politically crusading, escapist, and finally cynical. If he has perhaps too much of the goody-goody about him, at least he is not priggish; Hergé admitting as much, saying, "If Tintin is a moralist, he's a moralist who doesn't take things too seriously, so humour is never far away from his stories." It is this sense of humour that makes the appeal of Tintin truly international.

== Reception ==
The Adventures of Tintin was one of the most popular European comics of the 20th century. Tintin remains popular today; by the time of the centenary of Hergé's birth in 2007, Tintin had been published in more than 70 languages with sales of more than 200 million copies.

=== Literary criticism ===
The study of Tintin has become the life work of many literary critics, observers sometimes referring to this study as "Tintinology". A prominent literary critic of Tintin is Philippe Goddin, "Belgium's leading authority on Hergé", author of numerous books on the subject, including Hergé and Tintin, Reporters and the biography Hergé: lignes de vie. In 1983, Benoît Peeters published Le Monde d'Hergé, subsequently published in English as Tintin and the World of Hergé in 1988. The reporter Michael Farr brought Tintin literary criticism to the English language with works such as Tintin, 60 Years of Adventure (1989), Tintin: The Complete Companion (2001), Tintin & Co. (2007) and The Adventures of Hergé (2007), as had English screenwriter Harry Thompson, the author of Tintin: Hergé and his Creation (1991).

=== Controversy ===
Tintin's earliest stories naively depicted controversial images, with Tintin engaging in racial stereotypes, animal cruelty, violence, colonialism, including ethnocentric caricatured portrayals of non-Europeans, most notably and notoriously in Tintin in the Congo. Later, Hergé made corrections to Tintin's actions, for example, replacing Tintin's dynamiting of a rhinoceros with an incident in which the rhino flee after accidentally discharging Tintin's rifle, and called his earlier actions "a transgression of my youth."

=== Legacy ===
In the end, you know, my only international rival is Tintin! We are the small ones, who do not let themselves be had by the great ones.

— Charles de Gaulle (Note: "Au fond, vous savez, mon seul rival international c'est Tintin! Nous sommes les petits qui ne se laissent pas avoir par les grands." Spoken by French General Charles de Gaulle, according to his Minister for Cultural Affairs André Malraux. De Gaulle had just banned all NATO aircraft bases from France; "the great ones" referred to USA and USSR. De Gaulle then added, "On ne s'en aperçoit pas, à cause de ma taille." ("Only nobody notices the likeness because of my height."))

As Farr observes, "Hergé created a hero who embodied human qualities and virtues but no faults. The Adventures of Tintin mirror the past century while Tintin himself provides a beacon of excellence for the future." Thompson says Tintin is "almost featureless, ageless, sexless", and does not appear to be burdened with a personality. Yet this very anonymity remains the key to Tintin's gigantic international success. With so little to mark him out, anybody can identify with him and live out his adventures. Millions have done so, both adults and children, including the likes of Steven Spielberg, Andy Warhol, Wim Wenders, Françoise Sagan, Harold Macmillan and General Charles de Gaulle, who considered Tintin his only international rival.

While working on Tintin's next adventure, Tintin and the Alph'Art, Hergé died at 76 on 3 March 1983, and with him died the adventures of his most famous character. Several leading French and Belgian newspapers devoted their front pages to the news, some illustrating it with a panel of Snowy grieving over his master's unconscious body.

==== Statues and commemorative murals of Tintin ====
- The Grand Sablon / Grote Zavel, Brussels, Belgium contains a life sized bronze statue of Tintin and his Fox Terrier, Snowy just outside the Comics Cafe.
- A mural on a building at Rue de l'Etuve / Stoofstraat on Brussels' Comic Book Route recreates a scene of Tintin and Captain Haddock coming down a building fire escape from The Calculus Affair.
- The South station in Brussels contains a huge reproduction of a panel from Tintin in America.
- The Le Lombard building in Central Brussels (Near the South railway station) has two giant heads of Tintin and Snowy on the roof. These are lit up with neon lights at night. Lombard was the editor of the Journal de Tintin.
- The Stokkel/Stockel metro station in Brussels has huge panels with scenes from Tintin comic books painted as murals.
- The Uccle cultural center (Rue Ruge) in Belgium has a life size statue of Tintin and Snowy. The statue was sculpted by Nat Neujean and commissioned by Raymond Leblanc, the publisher of Tintin magazine.
- One of the high speed trains of Thalys is covered with images from Tintin comic books.
- The Belgian Comic Strip Center in Brussels contains a 1952 bust of Tintin by the artist Nat Neujean
- In 2024, Adidas would design a new away jersey for the Belgium national football team inspired by Tintin's outfit.

== Adaptations ==
Tintin as he appears in Steven Spielberg's 2011 motion capture feature film The Adventures of Tintin as portrayed by Jamie Bell

Tintin has appeared in real-life events staged by publishers for publicity stunts. Tintin's first live appearance was at the Gare du Nord station in Brussels on 8 May 1930, towards the end publication of the first adventure, Tintin in the Land of the Soviets. Fifteen-year-old Lucien Pepermans dressed to play the part and travelled with Hergé to the station by train. They were expecting only a handful of readers but instead found themselves mobbed by a whole horde of fans. (Note: Some seventy years later, in 2000, Pepermans, now living in a retirement home, was guest of honour at a meeting of the Amis d'Hergé ("Friends of Hergé"), hosted by Jean-Pierre Talbot, former Tintin actor.) Fourteen-year-old Henri Dendoncker appeared as Tintin returning from Tintin in the Congo. (Note: On 9 July 1931, Boy Scout Henri Dendoncker dressed in African safari gear and played the part for Tintin's return from the Congo. He appeared with a Fox Terrier representing Snowy, accompanied by Hergé, ten Congolese, and two other boys dressed as Quick & Flupke. Later, during World War II, Dendoncker served with Britain's SOE. Captured by Nazi Germany, he survived the concentration camps, was decorated by the Queen, and became a British citizen under the name "Henri Dark".) Others have played Tintin returning from the adventures Tintin in America and The Blue Lotus.

Actress Jane Rubens was the first to play Tintin on stage in April 1941. The plays, written by Jacques Van Melkebeke, included Tintin in India: The Mystery of the Blue Diamond and Mr. Boullock's Disappearance. She was later replaced by 11-year-old Roland Ravez, who also lent his voice to recordings of the Cigars of the Pharaoh and The Blue Lotus. Jean-Pierre Talbot played Tintin in two live-action movie adaptations: Tintin and the Golden Fleece (1961) and Tintin and the Blue Oranges (1964). Canadian actor Colin O'Meara voiced Tintin in the 1991 Canadian-made The Adventures of Tintin animated TV series, which originally aired on HBO and subsequently on Nickelodeon. At the same time, actor Richard Pearce provided the voice of Tintin for a radio drama series of Tintin created by the BBC, which also starred Andrew Sachs as Snowy. In 2005, English actor Russell Tovey played the role at the London Barbican Theatre for a Young Vic adaptation of Tintin in Tibet.

Shortly before Hergé's death in 1983, he came to admire the work of Steven Spielberg; who he felt was the only director who could successfully bring his Tintin to the big screen. The result was the 2011 motion capture feature film The Adventures of Tintin, which merges plots from three Tintin books.

=== Tintin filmography ===
Live-action Feature films

- 1961: Tintin and the Golden Fleece (Tintin et le Mystère de la Toison d'or) by Jean-Jacques Vierne
- 1964: Tintin and the Blue Oranges (Tintin et les Oranges bleues) by Philippe Condroyer

Animated films

- 1947: The Crab with the Golden Claws (Le Crabe aux pinces d'or) by Claude Misonne
- 1964: The Calculus Case by Ray Goossens
- 1969: Tintin et la SGM by Raymond Leblanc
- 1969: Tintin and the Temple of the Sun (Tintin et le Temple du Soleil) by Eddie Lateste
- 1972: Tintin and the Lake of Sharks (Tintin et le lac aux requins) by Raymond Leblanc
- 2011: The Adventures of Tintin (Les Aventures de Tintin: Le Secret de La Licorne) by Steven Spielberg

Television series

- 1957–1961: Hergé's Adventures of Tintin (animated series)
- 1992: The Adventures of Tintin (animated series of 3 seasons 13 episodes each)

== See also ==
- List of The Adventures of Tintin characters
