= Jenny Orléans =

- Born: Jenny Ninon Orléan; 19 January 1932; Paris, France
- Died: 12 April 2008 (aged 76); Paris, France
- Occupation: Actress
- Years active: 1953-1970

Jenny Orléans (January 19, 1932 – April 12, 2008) was a French actress.

== Filmography ==
- 1953: Les Enfants de l'amour (by Léonide Moguy)
- 1957: Lovers of Paris (by Julien Duvivier) - Rose Compardon (uncredited)
- 1958: Me and the Colonel (by Peter Glenville) - Nun (uncredited)
- 1958: Der eiserne Gustav (by George Hurdalek) - Dicke Französin
- 1959: Babette Goes to War (by Christian-Jaque) - Girl / Une fille
- 1960: Goodbye Again (by Anatole Litvak)
- 1960: Un couple (by Jean-Pierre Mocky) - Julie
- 1962: Les Trois Chapeaux claques (by Jean-Pierre Marchand : Mme Olga) (TV movie) - Mme Olga
- 1963: La Vie à l'envers (by Alain Jessua) - La concierge
- 1964: La Cité de l'indicible peur (by Jean-Pierre Mocky) - Madame Gosseran
- 1964: Tintin and the Blue Oranges (by Philippe Condroyer) - La Castafiore
- 1964: Déclic et des claques (by Philippe Clair)
- 1964: Me and the Forty Year Old Man (by Jack Pinoteau) - La voisine de Bénéchol
- 1965: The Sleeping Car Murders (by Costa-Gavras) - La soeur de René Cabourg
- 1965: Lady L (by Peter Ustinov) - Blonde girl (uncredited)
- 1965: La Bonne Occase (by Michel Drach)
- 1966: Sale temps pour les mouches... (by Guy Lefranc)
- 1967: Les Grandes Vacances (by Jean Girault)
- 1967: The Night of the Generals (by Anatole Litvak) - Otto's Wife
- 1968: Time to Live (by Bernard Paul) (cut) (TV movie) - La servante
- 1970: L'Ardoise (by Claude Bernard-Aubert)

== Theatre ==
- 1954: La Matinée d'un homme de lettres (by Tania Balachova after Anton Tchekhov, directed by Tania Balachova, Théâtre de la Huchette)
- 1956: Les Amants puérils (by Fernand Crommelynck, directed by Tania Balachova, Théâtre des Noctambules)
- 1959: Les Trois Chapeaux claque (by Miguel Mihura, directed by Olivier Hussenot, Théâtre de l'Alliance française)
- 1959: Un joueur (by André Charpak after Fyodor Dostoyevsky, directed by André Charpak, Théâtre de l'Alliance française)
- 1960: L'Etouffe-Chrétien (by Félicien Marceau, directed by André Barsacq, Théâtre de la Renaissance)
- 1961: Gorgonio (by Tullio Pinelli, directed by Claude Sainval, Théâtre des Champs-Élysées)
