= Marie-Pierre Casey =

French actress

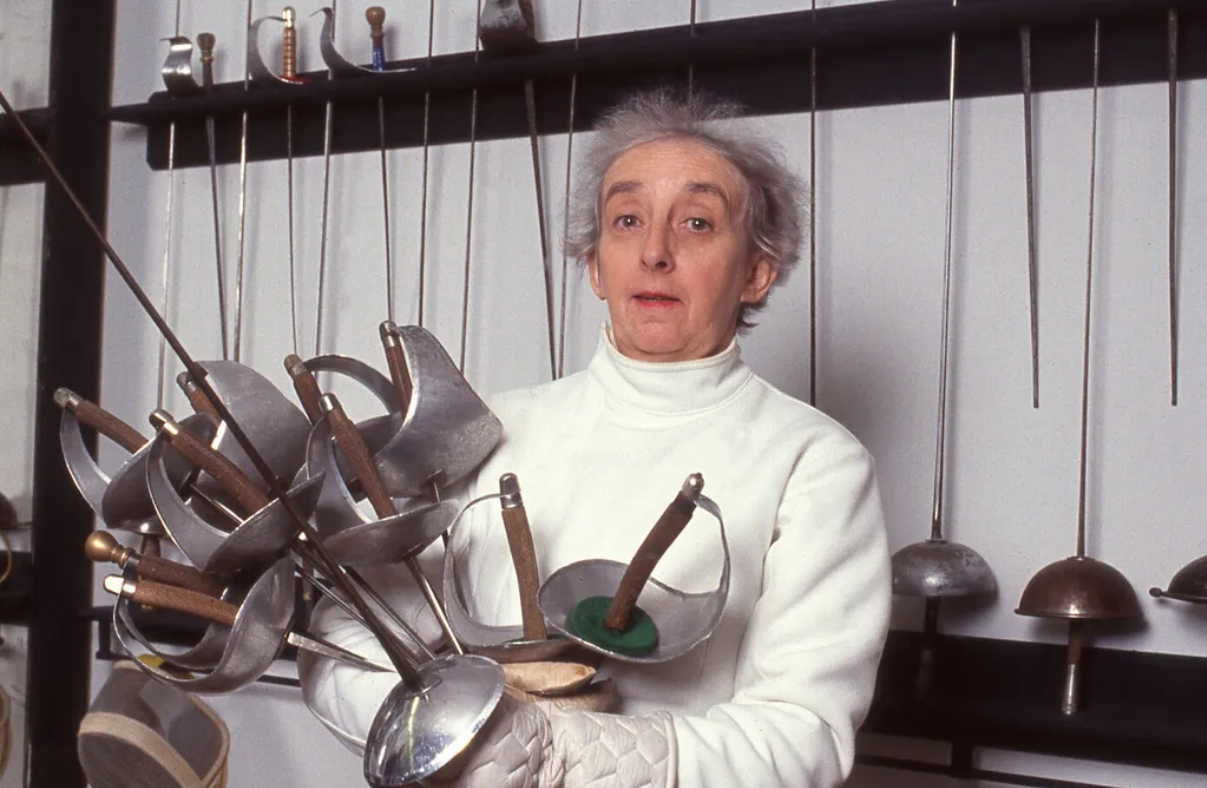
- Born: 24 January 1937 (age 89); Le Creusot, Saône-et-Loire
- Occupation: Actress
- Notable work: Certains l'aiment froide Les Choses de la vie Mille milliards de dollars

Marie-Pierre Casey is a French actress, born on 24 January 1937 in Creusot, Saône-et-Loire.

== Early life and education ==
Marie-Pierre Casey was born on 24 January 1937 in Le Creusot. From the age of nine, she was educated at a boarding school in Charolais with her sister. It was there that she discovered her passion for theatre. Her first role was Doc, the leader of the seven dwarfs in the Grimm brothers' fairy tale Snow White and the Seven Dwarfs, performed for the end of year celebration organised by the nuns.

She studied at the Conservatoire de Lyon and at Cours Simon in Paris, before starting at the cabarets of the Rive Gauche.

== Career ==
In the early 1950s, Marie-Pierre Casey had a small role in the film Forbidden Games directed by René Clément (1952), where she appeared as a shadow.

In 1960, she appeared briefly as a nurse in the film Certains l'aiment froide by Jean Bastia. In 1967, she played a cashier at the Royal Garden in Playtime by Jacques Tati.

In 1970, she appeared in three movies: The Things of Life by Claude Sautet, Children of Mata Hari by Jean Delannoy, and Le Cinéma de papa by Claude Berri.

In 1980, she became known across France for her role in the TV advert for the Johnson cleaning product Pledge (named Pliz in France). In the advert, Casey, dressed as a cleaning lady, sprays the product on a large board table, puts on an apron and proceeds to slide down the table on her stomach. She says "It's better that way, because I wouldn't do that every day", which made the advert a real success amongst television viewers. The role also brought her to the attention of Jean Becker, who noticed her during an advertising awards ceremony and subsequently offered her a role.

== Filmography ==
=== Films ===
- 1952: Jeux interdits by René Clément: a sister
- 1960: Certains l'aiment froide by Jean Bastia: nurse
- 1967: Playtime by Jacques Tati: cashier at the Royal Garden
- 1967: Les Encerclés by Christian Gion: woman from the Catholic League
- 1970: The Things of Life by Claude Sautet: postwoman
- 1970: La Peau de Torpedo by Jean Delannoy: postwoman
- 1970: Le Cinéma de papa by Claude Berri: headmistress
- 1971: L'Humeur vagabonde by 'Edouard Luntz
- 1973: Elle court, elle court la banlieue by Gérard Pirès: Neighbour who comes to babysit
- 1973: The Dominici Affair by Claude Bernard-Aubert: woman who congratulates the commissioner
- 1973: Na ! by Jacques Martin: woman from the salvation army
- 1974: OK patron by Claude Vital
- 1974: On s'est trompé d'histoire d'amour by Jean-Louis Bertuccelli: Mrs Dalmart
- 1974: Un nuage entre les dents by Marco Pico: Baker
- 1976: Hippopotamours by Christian Fuin: The judge's wife
- 1976: Les Ambassadeurs by Naceur Ktari: social worker
- 1980: La Banquière by Francis Girod
- 1980: Le Coup du parapluie by Gérard Oury
- 1981: Viens chez moi, j'habite chez une copine by Patrice Leconte: Cecile's concierge
- 1981: Pétrole ! Pétrole ! by Christian Gion: French Post employee
- 1982: Mille milliards de dollars by Henri Verneuil
- 1982: Ça va faire mal ! by Jean-François Davy: Madeleine, Leopold's maid
- 1983: La Petite Bande by Michel Deville: German woman
- 1983: One Deadly Summer by Jean Becker: Miss Tussaud, the nurse
- 1983: Y a-t-il un pirate sur l'antenne ? by Jean-Claude Roy: cleaning woman
- 1985: Gros Dégueulasse by Bruno Zincone: the offended woman in black
- 1988: Sortis de route by Gilbert Roussel/Bruno Mattei: Hortense
- 1998: Let There Be Light by Arthur Joffé: Mother Michu
- 2004: Les Dalton by Philippe Haïm: Ma Cassidy
- 2023: Les petites victoires by Mélanie Auffret: Jeannine

== Discography ==
- 1984: Je suis un sex symbol
- 1984: Sexy Varoum
- 1992: God Save The Cheese
