= Max Elloy =

French actor

- Born: 5 May 1900; Paris, France
- Died: 16 January 1975 (aged 74); Paris, France
- Occupation: Actor
- Years active: 1942-1967

Max Elloy (5 May 1900 – 16 January 1975) was a French film actor. He appeared in 50 films between 1942 and 1967.

== Filmography ==
- Mademoiselle Swing (1942) - Max
- No Love Allowed (1942) - Le voyageur affamé
- Feu Nicolas (1943) - Le croque-mort
- Patrie (1946)
- Mademoiselle s'amuse (1948)
- Une femme par jour (1949) - Freddy
- Manon (1949) - Le garçon de restaurant (uncredited)
- Return to Life (1949) - Le vieux barman (segment 2 : "Le retour d'Antoine") (uncredited)
- We Will All Go to Paris (1950) - Honorin
- The Chocolate Girl (1950)
- King Pandora (1950) - Un créancier
- Father's Dilemma (1950) - Lo spazzino
- Mon ami le cambrioleur (1950) - L'agent de police
- Atoll K (1951) - Antoine
- Nous irons à Monte Carlo (1951) - Himself
- Pleasures of Paris (1952) - Léon
- The Sparrows of Paris (1953) - Petit Louis
- His Father's Portrait (1953) - Le chauffeur
- Mam'zelle Nitouche (1954)
- Secrets d'alcôve (1954) - Firmin (uncredited)
- Leguignon the Healer (1954) - Le facteur
- Mourez, nous ferons le reste (1954)
- Sur le banc (1954) - Un clochard
- Oasis (1955) - Natkine
- Pas de souris dans le business (1955)
- Les Nuits de Montmartre (1955)
- Maid in Paris (1956)
- Pardonnez nos offenses (1956)
- Paris, Palace Hotel (1956) - Un maître d'hôtel
- Les Lumières du soir (1956) - M. Marcel - l'agent de police
- L'Homme et l'Enfant (1956) - (uncredited)
- Mitsou ou Comment l'esprit vient aux filles (1956) - Le maître d'hôtel chez Larue
- Let's Be Daring, Madame (1957) - Le brigadier
- Mademoiselle and Her Gang (1957) - Victor
- Nous autres à Champignol (1957) - Maxime
- C'est arrivé à 36 chandelles (1957) - L' huissier
- Le désir mène les hommes (1957) - Le brigadier
- Le Souffle du désir (1958) - Alexis
- Neither Seen Nor Recognized (1958) - (uncredited)
- Mimi Pinson (1958)
- Madame et son auto (1958)
- The Gendarme of Champignol (1959) - Le gendarme La Huchette
- Babette Goes to War (1959) - Firmin
- Certains l'aiment froide (1960) - Simpson, le majordome
- Les Tortillards (1960) - M. Bonfils (uncredited)
- Dans l'eau qui fait des bulles (1961) - Un pêcheur
- All the Gold in the World (1961) - Le garde-champêtre
- Tintin and the Golden Fleece (1961) - Nestor
- Alerte au barrage (1961)
- The Devil and the Ten Commandments (1961) - (uncredited)
- It's Not My Business (1962) - L'huissier
- Le Magot de Josefa (1963) - Un villageois
- That Man from Rio (1964) - Le médecin (uncredited)
- Tintin and the Blue Oranges (1964) - Nestor
- Trois enfants dans le désordre (1966) - L'appariteur
