= Théâtre Daunou =

Theatre in Paris, France

Coordinates: 48.8694°N 2.3319°E

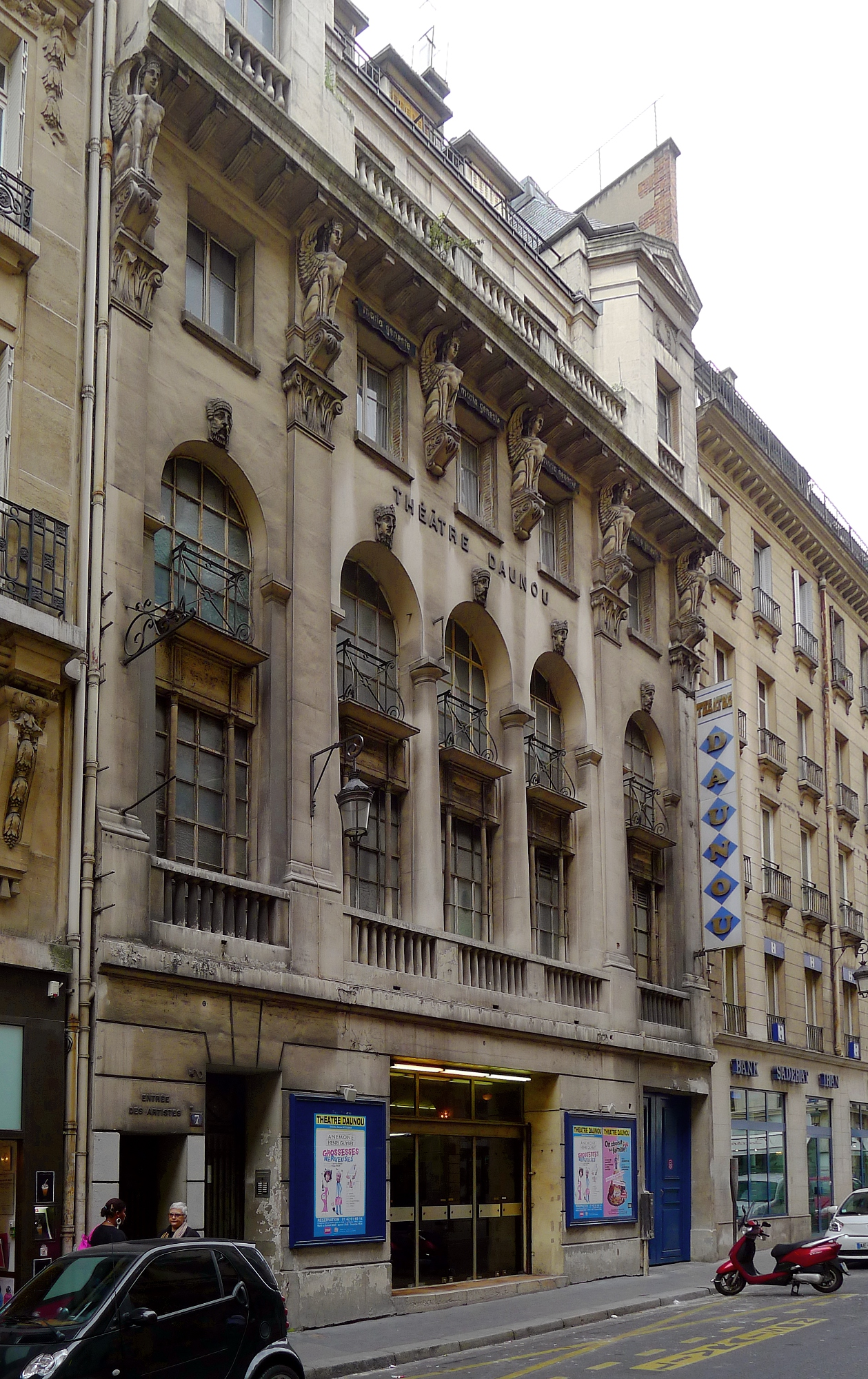
- Théâtre Daunou
- Interactive map of the Théâtre Daunou area

General information
- Location: 2nd arrondissement of Paris, France
- Inaugurated: 1921

Other information
- Seating capacity: 450

The Théâtre Daunou is a Parisian theater with 450 seats, located at 7 rue Daunou in the 2nd arrondissement of Paris. The name is sometimes written as Theatre Daunou.

== History ==
The theatre was a command from the actress Jane Renouardt, and the structure was designed by architect Auguste Bluysen. The building is in an Art déco style, and the interior design was the work of Jeanne Lanvin and Armand-Albert Rateau (of the Lanvin Decoration workshop).

The building was inaugurated on 30 December 1921 with Une sacrée petite blonde by André Birabeau and Pierre Wolff, followed by the operetta Ta bouche by Yves Mirande and Albert Willemetz, music by Maurice Yvain.

In December 1971, a blaze destroyed the theatre; it reopened its doors in February 1973 with the play Aurélia by Robert Thomas. Since its opening, the theatre has mainly presented comedies.

== Programs ==
- 1921: Une sacré petite blonde by André Birabeau and Pierre Wolff followed by the operetta Ta bouche by Yves Mirande and Albert Willemetz, music Maurice Yvain, directed by Edmond Roze
- 1923: Phili, moral tale in free verse and in five tableaux by Jacques Bousquet and Henri Falk after Abel Hermant, directed by Edmond Roze, 30 December
- Madame, operetta by Albert Willemetz, music Henri Christiné, 14 December
- 1924: Gosse de riche, operetta in three acts, libretto Jacques Bousquet and Henri Falk, 2 May
- Ça by Claude Gevel, October
- 1925: L'Affaire Juliette, comedy in one act by André Pascal, 14 January
- L'École du bonheur, comedy in three acts by Paul Gavault
- J'adore ça, operetta in three acts by Albert Willemetz and Saint-Granier, music by Henri Christiné, 14 March
- 1926: Elle et lui by Albert Cornu and Jean Mathieu, 2 January
- L'École du bonheur comedy in three acts by Paul Gavault, 13 February
- Alraune, play in three acts by René Florian after the novel by Hanns Heinz Ewers, 30 April
- Hélène, operetta bouffa in three acts by Fernand Nozière, 12 June
- Elle ou moi ?, operetta by Jean Bastia after a short story by Mark Twain, music by Albert Chantrier, 12 September
- Le Cœur ébloui by Lucien Descaves, directed by Lugné-Poe, 19 October
- 1927: La Poupée française, comedy in three acts and five tableaux by Valentine Jager-Schmidt and André Jager-Schmidt, 12 March
- Fanny et ses gens by Pierre Scize and Andrée Méry after Jerome K. Jerome, directed by Edmond Roze,
- Lulu, operetta in three acts, libretto and lyrics Serge Véber, music by Philippe Parès and Georges van Parys, 14 September
- 1929: Jean V, operetta by Jacques Bousquet and Henri Falk, music Maurice Yvain, 2 March
- Sans façons, operetta in three acts by Jean Alley, music Georges Auric, 24 April
- La Femme au chat, comedy in three acts by Pierre Veber and Henry de Gorsse after Oreste Poggio, directed by Harry Baur, 18 May
- Arthur by André Barde, music Henri Christiné, 4 September
- 1930: Fleurs de luxe by Paul Armont and Marcel Gerbidon, 27 February
- Par le temps qui court revue by Rip, April
- Pépé comedy in three acts by André Barde, music Maurice Yvain, 25 October
- Mistigri, comedy in four acts by Marcel Achard, directed by Jacques Baumer, 22 December
- 1932: Deux fois deux, operetta in three acts by Raoul Praxy, music Gaston Gabaroche, 28 January
- Dix neuf ans, operetta by Jean Bastia, music Pascal Bastia, 28 March
- 1934: Loulou et ses boys, operetta in three acts by Marc Cab, Paul Farge and Pierre Bayle, music Michel Emer and Georges Sellers, 7 December
- 1935: Une nuit, comedy in three acts by René Pujol, 11 May
- 1937: Pamplemousse, comedy in three acts by André Birabeau, 19 May
- 1938: Dame Nature by André Birabeau
- 1938: Le Nid, comedy in three acts by André Birabeau, 14 December
- 1939: La Réussite by Yvette Mercier-Gouin, 5 May
- 1941: L'Amant de Bornéo, comedy in three acts and four tableaux by Roger-Ferdinand and José Germain, 28 January
- Tout n'est pas noir by André Birabeau, directed by Robert Blome,
- 1942: Dans sa candeur naïve by Jacques Deval, directed by Marcel Vergne,
- Le Nid, comedy in three acts by André Birabeau,
- Le Fleuve d'Amour by André Birabeau, 12 November
- 1943: Rêves à forfait by Marc-Gilbert Sauvajon, 3 December
- 1944: Monseigneur, tale in three acts by Michel Dulud
- 1945: Mademoiselle Star by André de Wissant, music Pascal Bastia, with the composer
- Raffles by Ernest William Hornung, D. Nicodemi, directed by Jean Paqui, 8 November
- 1946: L'Amant de paille by Marc-Gilbert Sauvajon, 2 February
- La Monnaie du Pape, comedy in five tableaux by Michelle Lahaye, directed by Robert Dhéry, June
- Azaïs, comedy in three acts by Georges Beer and Louis Verneuil, October
- Dans sa candeur naïve, comedy in three acts by Jacques Deval, December
- 1947: Le vent qui vient de loin, comedy in three acts by Pierre Rocher,
- Enlevez-moi, operetta by Raoul Praxy and Henry Hallais,
- 1948: Ils ont vingt ans by Roger Ferdinand, directed by Jacques Baumer, 19 March
- 1949: Le Médecin malgré lui by Molière
- La Galette des Rois by Roger Ferdinand, directed by Jean Wall, 18 December
- 1950: George et Margaret, comedy in three acts by Gerald Savory, adaptation by Marc-Gilbert Sauvajon and Jean Wall, directed by the latter,
- Ami-ami, comedy in three acts by Pierre Barillet and Jean-Pierre Gredy, directed by Jean Wall, 9 December
- 1951: Phèdre, comedy with one voice by André Ransan, 31 May
- Le Visiteur by Albert Dubeux, 16 June
- Sans cérémonie by Jacques Vilfrid and Jean Girault, 23 September
- Le Bon Débarras, comedy in three acts by Pierre Barillet and Jean-Pierre Gredy, directed by Jean Wall, 9 February
- 1953: Ah ! les Belles Bacchantes, by the Branquignols, directed by Robert Dhéry, 16 June
- 1954: Chair de poule by Pierre Dac and Robert Rocca
- 1956: La Plume by Pierre Barillet and Jean-Pierre Gredy, directed by Jean Wall, 12 January
- Lady Windermere's Fan by Oscar Wilde, directed by Marcelle Tassencourt, 24 February
- L'Homme qui se donnait la comédie by Emlyn Williams, directed by Jacques Valois, September
- Virginie by Michel André, 14 December
- 1958: Candida by George Bernard Shaw, directed by Roland Piétri, March
- Les portes claquent by Michel Fermaud, 12 December
- 1960: Madame, je vous aime by Serge Veber, directed by Guy Lauzin, 27 April
- La Petite Datcha by Vasiliei Vasil'evitch Chkvarkin, directed by René Dupuy, 8 September
- 1961: Que les hommes sont chers !' by Jaime Silas, directed by Robert Manuel, 21 October
- 1962: Mic-mac de Jean Meyer, directed by the author, 23 November
- 1963: Bon Week-End Monsieur Benett by Arthur Watkyn, directed by Michel Fagadau, August
- 1964: Chat en poche by Georges Feydeau, directed by Jean-Laurent Cochet, 1 October
- 1965: Pepsie, comedy in three acts by Pierre-Edmond Victor, directed by Jean-Laurent Cochet, 16 November
- 1970: Pantoufle by Alan Ayckbourn, directed by Jean-Laurent Cochet, 18 September
- 1973: Aurélia by Robert Thomas, directed by the author
- La Complice by Louis C. Thomas and Jacques Rémy, directed by Jacques Ardouin
- Virgule by Roger Hanin
- 1975: Monsieur Masure by Claude Magnier, directed by Michel Roux,
- 1977: The Portrait of Dorian Gray by Oscar Wilde, directed by Pierre Boutron
- 1978: Les Bâtards by Robert Thomas, directed by the author
- 1979: Remarie-moi by Nicole de Buron, directed by Michel Roux
- 1980: L'Homme, la bête et la vertu by Luigi Pirandello, directed by Henri Tisot
- 1981: Et ta sœur by Jean-Jacques Bricaire and Maurice Lasaygues, directed by Robert Manuel, 24 January
- 1981: La vie est trop courte by André Roussin, directed by Michel Fagadau, 10 October
- 1983: Argent, mon bel argent by Roger Hanin and directed by the author
- Un canapé-lit by Trevor Cowper, adaptation by Pierre Florent and Dominique Florent
- 1984: From Harlem to Broadway by Dany Francken and Victor Cuno
- 1985: Silence, on tourne by Michel Lengliney
- 1986: Au secours, elle me veut ! by Renée Taylor and Joseph Bologna, adaptation Marcel Mithois, directed by Michel Roux,
- 1987: Monsieur Masure by Claude Magnier, directed by Michel Roux, 3 September
- Y a-t-il un otage dans l'immeuble ? by Alain Reynaud-Fourton, directed by Maurice Risch
- 1988: Obsessions by Patrick Hamilton, directed by Raymond Gérôme
- Une grande famille by Jean-Claude Massoulier, directed by Marc Cassot
- 1989: Le Nouveau Testament by Sacha Guitry, directed by Jean-Laurent Cochet
- Tu m'as sauvé la vie by Sacha Guitry, directed by Jean-Laurent Cochet
- 1990: Le Diamant rose after Michael Pertwee, adaptation Pierre Laville, directed by Michel Roux, 19 February
- Bon week-end, monsieur Bennett by Arthur Watkin, directed by Michel Fagadau
- 1993: Le Canard à l'orange by William Douglas Home, directed by Pierre Mondy and Alain Lionel, 17 July
- 1994: La Source bleue by Pierre Laville, directed by Jean-Claude Brialy, 15 January
- Le Canard à l'orange by William Douglas Home, directed by Pierre Mondy and Alain Lionel, 25 July
- 1995: Un inspecteur vous demande by John Boynton Priestley, directed by Annick Blancheteau, 27 February
- Croque-monsieur by Marcel Mithois, directed by Raymond Acquaviva
- 1996: Max et Charlie by Laurence Jyl, directed by Jean-Luc Moreau
- 1997: Corot by Jacques Mougenot, directed by Jean-Laurent Cochet
- 1998: Obsessions by Patrick Hamilton, directed by Raymond Gérôme, 21 January
- Max et Charlie by Laurence Jyl, directed by Jean-Luc Moreau,
- 2000: Sous les pavés, la plage by Rita Brantalou and Philippe Bruneau, mise en scène Jean-Luc Moreau, 23 September
- 2001: Les Mille-Pattes by Jean-Christophe Barc, directed by Benoît Lavigne, 29 June
- Frou-Frou les Bains by Patrick Haudecœur, directed by Jacques Décombe, 25 September
- 2004: L'Imposteur by Jean-Christophe Barc and Alain Jeanbart, directed by Thierry Liagre, 22 January
- Et si on chantait by Jacques Pessis, directed by Rubia Matignon, David Bréval, Glysleïn Lefever, 7 April
- Patate by Marcel Achard, directed by Bernard Menez, 28 July
- Caramba by Guy Montagné, Sylvie Raboutet, directed by Eric Mariotto, Guy Montagné, 25 September
- 2005: Le Vison Voyageur and Ray Cooney and John Chapman, directed by Éric Hénon, 11 January
- Comment devenir une mère juive en 10 leçons and Paul Fuks, Dan Greenburg, directed by Jean-Paul Bazziconi, 25 January
- Frou-Frou les Bains by Patrick Haudecœur, directed by Jacques Décombe, 8 July
- 2006: The Decline of the American Empire by Denys Arcand, Claude-Michel Rome, directed by Claude-Michel Rome, 11 July
- Barbara, voyage d'une rive à l'autre by Catherine Le Cossec, Juli Noel, Marie-Thérèse Orain, 25 July
- 2007: Les lundis de la voyance, 5 March
- 2008: Jo et Joséphine by Jacques Pessis, directed by Rubia Matignon, 12 March
- L'Huître by Didier Caron, directed by the author, 2 July
- L'Allée du Roi by Françoise Chandernagor, directed by Jean-Claude Idée
- 2009: L'Allée du Roi by Françoise Chandernagor, directed by Jean-Claude Idée, 25 February
- Panne de télé by Laurence Jyl, directed by Olivier Macé and Jean-Pierre Dravel, 21 July
- La Parenthèse by Laure Charpentier, directed by Olivier Macé and Jean-Pierre Dravel, 3 November
- 2009: Laissez-moi sortir by Jean-Marie Chevret, directed by Olivier Macé and Jean-Pierre Dravel
- 2010: Laissez-moi sortir by Jean-Marie Chevret, directed by Olivier Macé and Jean-Pierre Dravel, 29 September
- Jacques Brel ou l'impossible rêve, directed by André Nerman, 8 April
- Fréhel, la complainte d'une vie by Pascale Lievyn, 20 May
- 2011: Rififoin dans les labours by Christian Dob, 25 January
- Grossesses nerveuses by Jean-Yves Rogale, directed by Philippe Hersen, 19 April
- L'Avare by Molière, directed by Colette Roumanoff, 9 May
- Grossesses nerveuses by Jean-Yves Rogale, directed by Philippe Hersen, 1 September

== See also ==
- List of theatres and entertainment venues in Paris
