= Comédie-Wagram =

Former entertainment venue within Paris

The Comédie-Wagram is a former entertainment venue located at 4 bis rue de l'Étoile in the 17th arrondissement of Paris and now destroyed.

The inauguration took place on 28 May 1926 under the name Œil de Paris as a review cabaret. A cinema theater in 1929–1930, the place turned into theatre and became the théâtre de 10 francs in 1933 before returning to cinema in 1937 under its first name.

After the Liberation of France, the place passed into the hands of Raymond Chamby and Maxime Fabert who renamed it Comédie-Wagram. The venue briefly bore the name Foly-Étoile in 1959 and disappeared in 1964 during a major urban operation between the rue de l'Étoile and the avenue des Ternes.

Maxime Fabert, Marc Camoletti, Boris Vian, Michel Leiris, Marthe Mercadier and many other French comedians performed there.

== Productions ==
- 1948: Interdit au public by Roger Dornès and Jean Marsan (2 May)
- 1950: Le Don d’Adèle by Pierre Barillet and Jean-Pierre Gredy (21 January)
- 1953: Le Collier de jade by Jean Sarment (27 January)
- 1954: La Machine à coudre by Jean Ferry and Claude Accursi (September)
- 1955: La femme sera toujours la femme, revue nue...cléaire by Jean Marsan, music by Georges Van Parys (May)
- 1956: Monsieur Masure by Claude Magnier (12 May)
- 1956: Ce diable d'ange by Pierre Destailles and Charles Michel (28 November)
- 1956: Ce soir je dîne chez moi by Clare Kummer, adaptation by Michel Veber (1896-1965) (29 September)
- 1958: Bonne Anna by Marc Camoletti
- 1959: Mon ange by Solange Terac (February)
- 1960: La Petite Vague by Geoffrey Thomas, adaptation by Andrée Méry (French creation, 4 February)
- 1961: Remue-ménage by Pierre Leloir (21 October)
- 1962: Teresa-Angelica by Valentino Bompiani, adaptation by Pierre Sabatier (French creation, 6 June)
- La Quadrature du cercle by Valentin Kataev
- La Farfada by Jean-Pierre Aumont
- Zoé by Jean Marsan
