= Moonlight in Maubeuge =

1962 film

Un clair de lune à Maubeuge
- Directed by: Jean Chérasse
- Written by: Claude Choublier; Pascal Bastia
- Produced by: Georges De La Grandière
- Starring: Claude Brasseur; Louis de Funès
- Cinematography: Roland Pontoizeau
- Edited by: Georges Alépée
- Music by: Pierre Perrin
- Distributed by: Compagnie Commerciale Française Cinématographique (CCFC)
- Release date: 19 December 1962 (France)
- Running time: 106 minutes
- Country: France
- Language: French

Moonlight in Maubeuge (French: Un clair de lune à Maubeuge), is a French comedy film from 1962, directed by Jean Chérasse, written by Claude Choublier, starring Claude Brasseur and Louis de Funès (uncredited). The film was known under the title Moonlight in Maubeuge (international English title).

== Cast ==
- Claude Brasseur: Walter, the right hand of Tonton Charly
- Pierre Perrin: Paul Prunier, the taxi compositor
- Bernadette Lafont: Charlotte, the secretary
- Rita Cadillac: Monique, a secretary
- Michel Serrault: Charpentier, the lecturer
- Jean Carmet: Fernand, the driver
- André Bourvil: Lui-même, singing the song to television
- Jacques Dufilho: the director of the 'Maison de la Radio'
- Jean Lefebvre: a miner
- Robert Manuel: Tonton Charly, the manager of Superdisco music
- Maria Pacôme: the journalist
- Louis de Funès (uncredited)
