= Tintin and the Blue Oranges =

1964 film

- Theatrical release poster by Hergé
- Directed by: Philippe Condroyer
- Written by: Hergé (characters); André Barret, Philippe Condroyer, Rémo Forlani and René Goscinny (adaptation); André Barret (dialogue and screenplay); José María Gutiérrez González Santos (uncredited)
- Produced by: André Barret (producer); Jacques Brua (administrative producer); Robert Laffont (producer)
- Starring: see below
- Cinematography: Jean Badal
- Edited by: Madeleine Bibollet
- Music by: Antoine Duhamel
- Release date: 18 December 1964
- Running time: 105 minutes
- Countries: France, Spain
- Languages: French, Arabic, Spanish

Tintin and the Blue Oranges (French: Tintin et les Oranges bleues) is a 1964 Franco-Spanish adventure comedy film directed by Philippe Condroyer and starring Jean-Pierre Talbot as Tintin. It was the second live-action film, with an original story based on characters from the comic book series The Adventures of Tintin, written and drawn by the Belgian artist Hergé. The accompanying book version is in photos and text rather than the usual comic-book style.

The term "blue orange" is a moderately popular image among the French, and was originally inspired by Paul Éluard's strange quote "Earth is blue like an orange" as a reference to the colour of the fruit when it rots.

The plot revolves around blue oranges, which can grow in desert conditions. They have a bitter and salty taste, which supposedly makes them inedible. Professor Calculus is kidnapped in order to assist another professor in improving the oranges.

== Plot ==
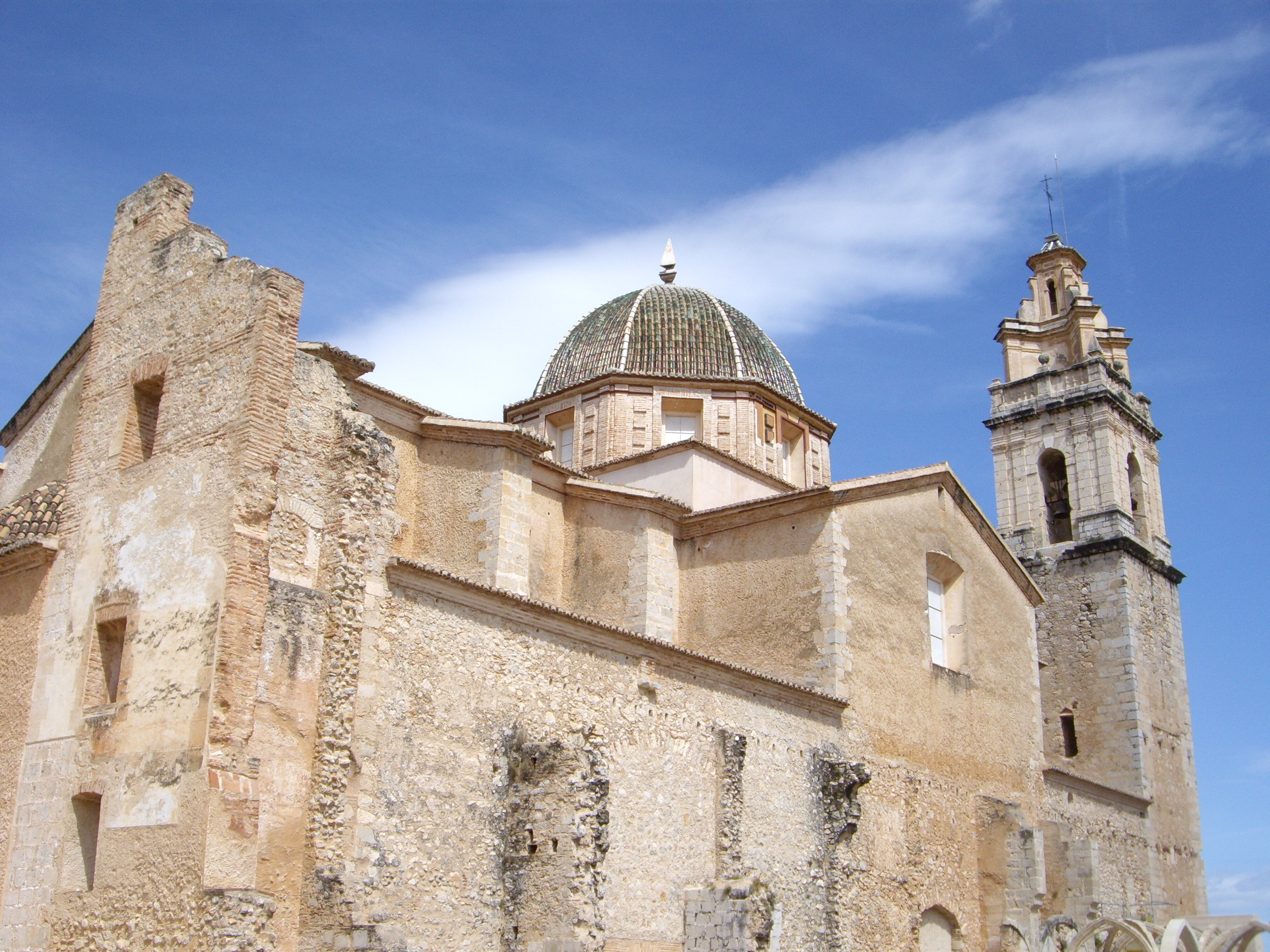
The Monastery of Santa María de la Valldigna in 2008.

Professor Calculus on (black-and-white) TV broadcasts an appeal to help end world hunger. He receives many letters and parcels, and among them is a blue orange, which can grow in desert conditions (and glows in the dark) from Professor Zalamea, but no letter of explanation. That night, two thieves break into Marlinspike Hall and steal the blue orange. With no other choice, Calculus, with Tintin, the Captain, and Snowy, go to Valencia (filmed in Burjassot, in Simat de la Valldigna at the Monastery of Santa María de la Valldigna, Gandia and Xàtiva).

Arriving, they find that Zalamea is not present at his hacienda. They are met instead by his cousin. Professor Calculus is kidnapped to help Zalamea perfect the blue oranges, which with neutron bombardment can mature in just five days, but they taste bitter and salty, making them inedible.

Tintin befriends a local boy, who takes him to his gang hideout and he finds out that a boy who was to take the parcel to the post office for Zalamea was attacked by a man with a blue dragon tattoo on his hand. Detectives Thomson and Thompson turn up from Interpol, investigating Zalamea's disappearance, and have an unfortunate incident with a bull.

The local boys find Fernando, the man with the tattoo, and Tintin and the Captain go to his hotel. Tintin picks the lock and gets into his room, and when Fernando returns, overhears him talking on a radio set to his chief, about a rendez-vous. Tintin and the Captain follow Fernando, but are knocked unconscious and taken away.

Thomson and Thompson check into a hotel, but are tricked by the villains, who use doubles to coax them from their rooms. Tintin and the Captain regain consciousness and find themselves in a grain silo, but are rescued by Snowy dropping a rope into it. Back in town, they find themselves pursued by the police, who chase them all around a market. Tintin and Haddock escape thanks to Bianca Castafiore. After an unexpected visit by a delegation from the visiting Emir of Sakali, Tintin and Haddock meet up again with their young friends. They decide to sneak back into Professor Zalamea's hacienda to test some new information, that is, the role of Estensoro (Zalamea's manservant) in the kidnapping. After successfully using animals with pans tied to their tails as a distraction, Tintin and Haddock find a radio identical to Fernando's in Estensoro's room, proving his involvement. Haddock's decision to drink Estensoro's whisky accidentally leads them to discover Zalamea's secret documents, and his own suspicions about the identity of his enemies.

Back at the villains' hideout, the professors manage to make a broadcast describing their whereabouts. Estensoro hears the broadcast and races off to inform his boss. Luckily, Tintin and Haddock also hear the broadcast and set off in hot pursuit. After a brief struggle, Estensoro is overcome, but the professors are nowhere to be found. The new kidnappers evidently had no use for the Thom(p)son twins, as they are discovered still tied up (much to the Captain's enjoyment). Snowy discovers an agal belonging to one of the Arab kidnappers, and Tintin realises that the rich Emir of Sakali (who had courted Bianca Castafiore earlier in the film) was the same man as the Arab enemy described by Professor Zalamea.

The rich Emir of Sakali's yacht is moored up at the docks, so Tintin and the Captain try to rescue the professors, but they have been drugged, and their loud voices raise the alarm, and Tintin and Haddock are caught by the emir. They escape and a fight ensues, as a horde of children turn up (warned by Snowy). The villains are thrown in the sea, the emir is subdued, and the police arrive to clean things up.

All turns out well and they are back at Marlinspike Hall for a celebration and photos. It is said that they hope to perfect the oranges within 10 years and also to learn to grow wheat, potatoes, eggplants, etc. in the desert. Just then, Thomson and Thompson turn up in their car, crash, and end up in the fountain, to the amusement of all. Greedy dogs eat a "THE END" sign.

== Cast ==
- Jean-Pierre Talbot as Tintin
- Ladeuche as Snowy
- Jean Bouise as Captain Archibald Haddock
- Félix Fernández as Professor Cuthbert Calculus
- Jenny Orléans as Bianca Castafiore
- Ángel Álvarez as Professor Zalamea
- Max Elloy as Nestor
- Franky François as Thomson
- André Marié as Thompson
- Pedro Mari Sánchez as Pablito
- Salvador Beguería as Francesito
- Pierre Desgraupes as himself

== Home media ==
Kino Lorber released a double feature DVD and Blu-Ray of Tintin and the Blue Oranges, alongside Tintin and the Golden Fleece on July 11, 2023.
