= Seven Pistols for a Massacre =

1967 film

- Italian: 7 pistole per un massacro
- Directed by: Mario Caiano
- Written by: Mario Caiano
- Screenplay by: Eduardo Manzanos
- Story by: Eduardo Manzanos
- Produced by: José Luis Galicia; Jaime Pérez Cubero
- Starring: Craig Hill; Giulia Rubini; Piero Lulli; Eduardo Fajardo; Nazzareno Zamperla; Jacques Herlin; Eleonora Vargas; Roberto Camardiel
- Cinematography: Sergio Martino; Julio Ortas
- Edited by: Gianmaria Messeri
- Music by: Francesco De Masi
- Production companies: Copercines, Cooperativa Cinematográfica; United Pictures
- Distributed by: Sánchez Ramade; Germania-Film GmbH; Sinister Cinema; Paradise Film Exchange; Hunter Home Video
- Release date: 29 April 1967 (Italy)
- Running time: 85 min
- Country: Italy

Seven Pistols for a Massacre or Adios, Hombre (Italian: 7 pistole per un massacro), is a 1967 Italian Spaghetti Western film directed by Mario Caiano, written by Eduardo Manzanos Brochero and scored by Francesco De Masi. It stars Craig Hill, Giulia Rubini and Eduardo Fajardo. It was shot in Spain.

== Cast ==
- Craig Hill as Will Flaherty
- Giulia Rubini as Peggy Flaherty
- Piero Lulli as Luke Brabham
- Eduardo Fajardo as Tilly
- Nazzareno Zamperla as Tom, Peggy's Brother
- Jacques Herlin as Horace Pim
- Spartaco Conversi
- Nello Pazzafini as King
- Massimo Carocci as Nick
- Pino Polidori
- Natale Nazzareno
- Tomás Picó
- Roberto Camardiel as Doc
- Eleonora Vargas as Judith
- Luigi Ciavarro as Little Tucson Deputy
- Gianfranco Clerici as Pablo
- Arnaldo Dell'Acqua as Poker Player
- Alberigo Donadeo as Man in Saloon
- Osiride Pevarello as Blacksmith
- Renzo Pevarello as Kid
- Caterina Trentini as Dancer
- Franco Ukmar as Hitman
- Goffredo Unger as Stagecoach Driver
- Rinaldo Zamperla as Hitman
- Nella Gambini
