= Jean-Pierre Talbot =

Belgian actor

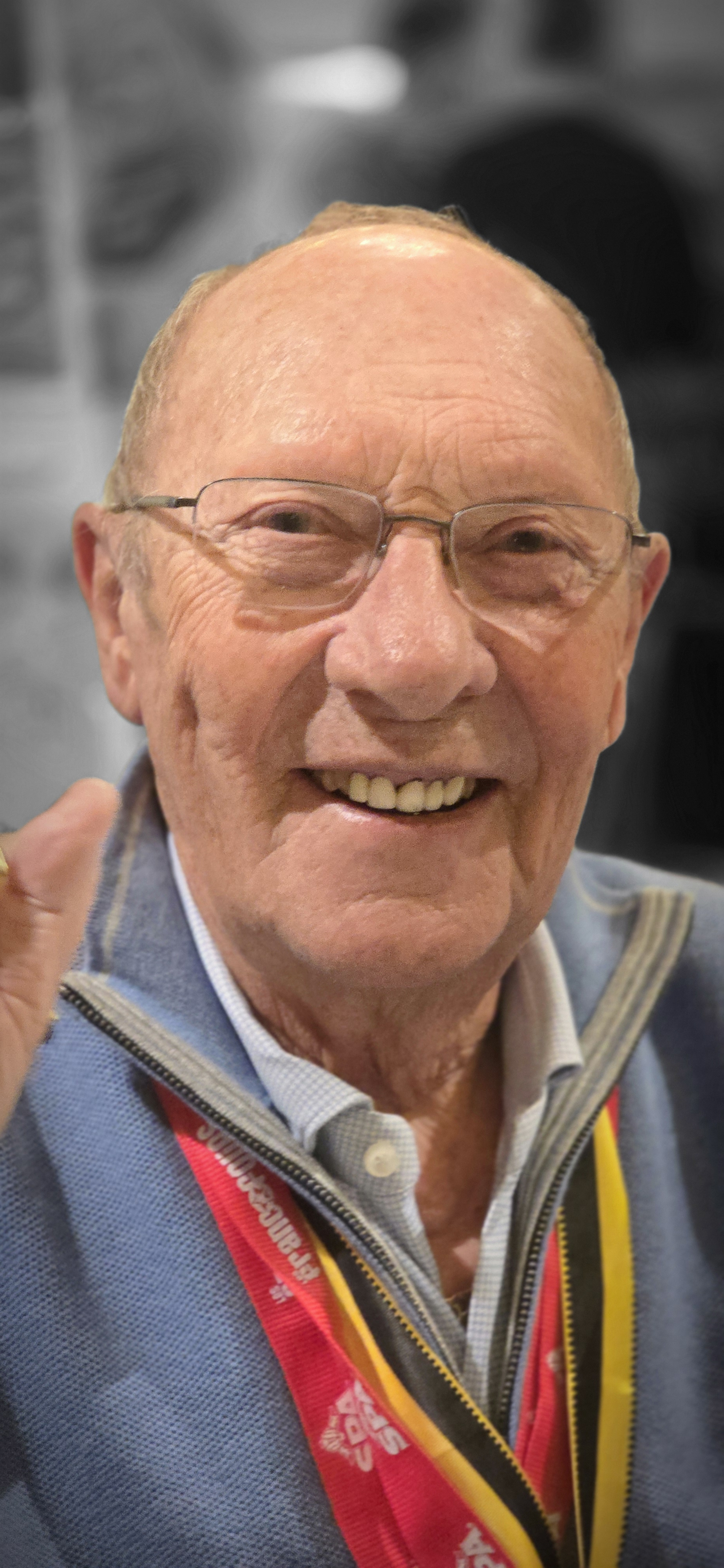
- Jean-Pierre Talbot in 2026.
- Born: 12 August 1943 (age 82); Spa, Liège, Belgium
- Occupations: Actor, Teacher
- Years active: 1961–1964
- Known for: Tintin and the Golden Fleece; Tintin and the Blue Oranges

Jean-Pierre Talbot (French: [talbo]; born 12 August 1943) is a Belgian retired teacher and actor, best known for his lead role of Tintin in the movies Tintin and the Golden Fleece and Tintin and the Blue Oranges.

== Biography ==
A teacher by profession, Talbot was first noted for his physical resemblance to that of Tintin while a sports instructor on a beach in Ostend. He was introduced to Hergé and the two became friends immediately. Talbot played the comic book character Tintin in the two Tintin live action films, Tintin and the Golden Fleece (Tintin et le mystère de la Toison d'or) (directed by Jean-Jacques Vierne in 1960) and Tintin and the Blue Oranges (Tintin et les Oranges Bleues) (directed by Philip Condroyer in 1964). In 1967, a third movie was scheduled but then canceled.

Talbot did not have other movie roles and pursued a career in teaching. He was headmaster of the King Baudouin Free School before retiring. He currently resides in Spa, Belgium. Jean-Pierre Talbot enjoys tennis, skiing, and canicross. He is married and has one daughter and three grandchildren.

In 2007 he appeared in an RTBF documentary, Quelque chose en nous... de Tintin, marking Hergé's centenary. His autobiography, J'étais Tintin au cinéma (Editions Jourdan, 2007, ISBN 978-2-9600741-0-9) received the Press Prize at the Prix Saint-Michel 2008 in Brussels.

== Filmography ==
Year	Title	Role	Notes
1961	Tintin and the Golden Fleece	Tintin	Main character
1964	Tintin and the Blue Oranges	Tintin	Main character
1976	Moi, Tintin (I, Tintin)	Tintin	Uncredited
2007	Quelque chose en nous... de Tintin	Himself	TV movie documentary
