= Andrée Méry =

French actress (1876–1968)

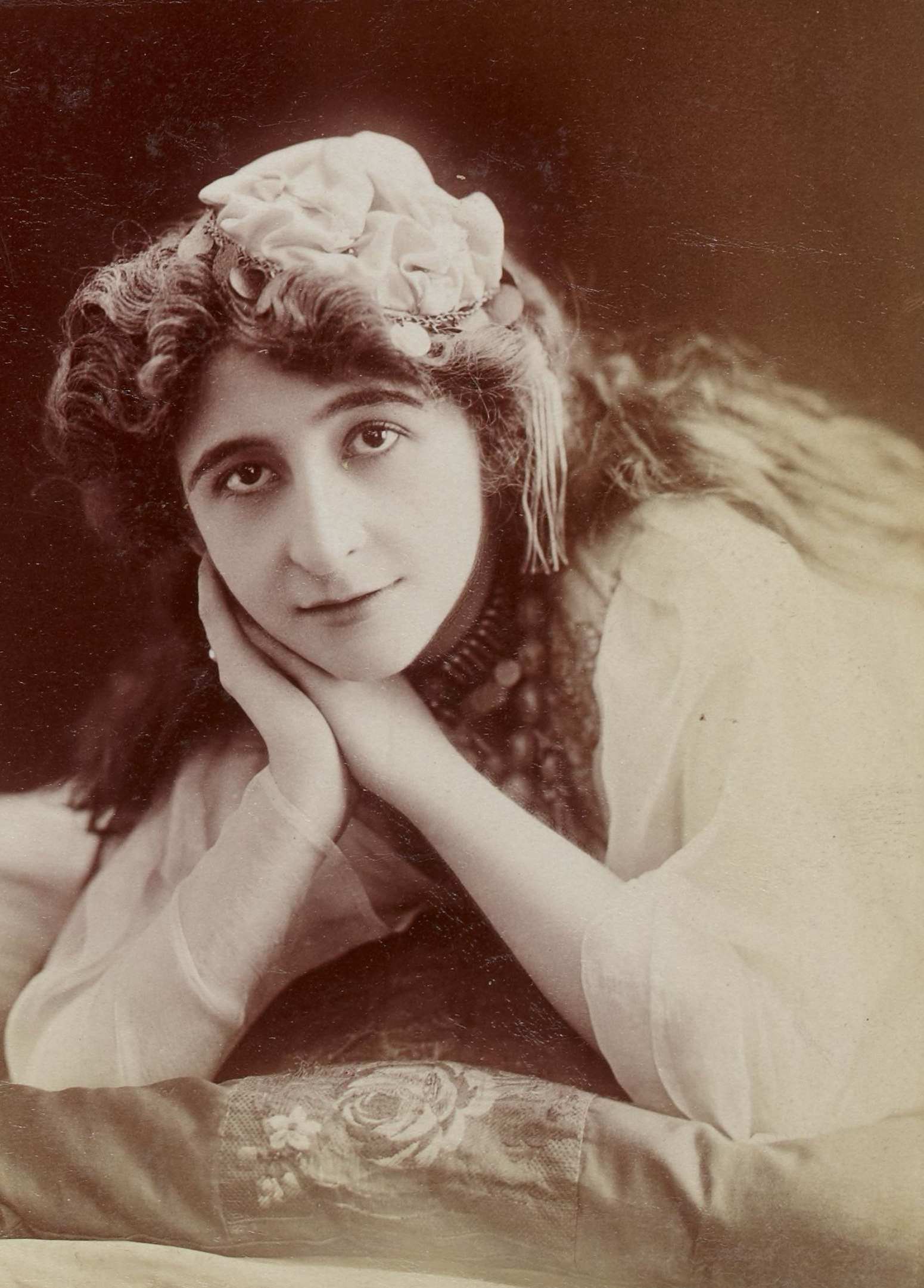
- Born: Blanche Andrée Mériaux; 28 December 1876; Paris, France
- Died: 28 March 1968 (aged 91); Neuilly-sur-Seine, France
- Burial place: Neuilly-sur-Seine Old Communal Cemetery
- Occupation(s): Actress, translator, playwright
- Years active: 1894–1950s

Andrée Méry (1876–1968; née Blanche Andrée Mériaux), was a French theater and film actress, translator, and playwright. In the early 19th century she often performed at the Odéon-Théâtre de l'Europe in Paris. In 1916, Méry worked as part of the company at Theatre Français in New York City but resigned in late-January after difficulties with director Lucien Laurent Bonheur.

== List of theatre roles ==
- 1905, L' Amourette by Pierre Veber, Théâtre Antoine, Paris; as Jeannine
- 1911, Musoette, at Odéon-Théâtre de l'Europe, Paris; as Gilberte Martinel
- 1916, Son Homme, at Theatre Français, New York City
- 1916, La Princesse Georges by Alexandre Dumas, at Theatre Français, New York City; as the princess
- 1916, Suzy by André Barde, at Theatre Français, New York City; was part of a double feature
- 1928, Week End, at Théâtre de la Potinière, Paris

== List of film roles ==
- Par un jour de carnaval (1910), silent film directed by Georges Denola
- La Vengeance de la morte (1910), silent film directed by Albert Capellani
- Nicole and Her Virtue (1932), as Mme. Buzet; drama film directed by René Hervil
- The Phantom Carriage (1939), as "la vieille repentie"; drama film directed by Julien Duvivier

== List of playwright and translation work ==
- 1927, Fanny et ses gens by Pierre Scize and Andrée Méry after Jerome K. Jerome, at Théâtre Daunou, Paris; directed by Edmond Roze
