= Olivier Hussenot =

French actor (1913–1978)

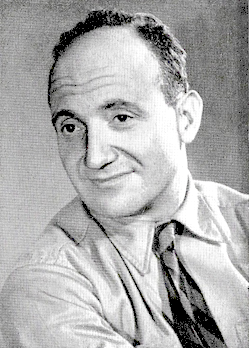
- Image of Olivier Hussenot
- Born: Olivier Marie André Hussenot-Desenonges; 10 September 1913; Paris, France
- Died: 25 August 1978 (aged 64); Meudon, France
- Occupation: Actor
- Years active: 1931–1978
- Notable work: La Marie du port Fanfan la Tulipe; The Roots of Heaven

Olivier Hussenot (10 September 1913 – 25 August 1978) was a French theatre and film actor.

== Career ==
The actor appeared in French, Italian and American films.

== Selected filmography ==
| Year | Title | Role | Director |
|---|---|---|---|
| 1949 | The Perfume of the Lady in Black | a madman | Louis Daquin |
| 1949 | Judgement of God | Gaspard Bernauer | Raymond Bernard |
| 1950 | La Marie du port | Marie's second uncle | Marcel Carné |
| 1950 | Atoll K | the commander | Léo Joannon |
| 1950 | Three Telegrams | Police Commissaire | Henri Decoin |
| 1951 | The Voyage to America | Soalhat, the gardener | Henri Lavorel |
| 1952 | Fanfan la Tulipe | soldier Tranche-Montagne | Christian-Jaque |
| 1952 | The Long Teeth | André Maurienne | Daniel Gélin |
| 1953 | Rhine Virgin | Meister | Gilles Grangier |
| 1954 | Oh No, Mam'zelle | a quartermaster | Yves Allégret |
| 1954 | Obsession | Louis Bernardin | Jean Delannoy |
| 1955 | The Grand Maneuver | a prefect | René Clair |
| 1955 | Je suis un sentimental | Michel Gérard | John Berry |
| 1955 | Bedevilled | the Hotel Manager | Mitchell Leisen |
| 1957 | Maigret Sets a Trap | inspector Lagrume | Jean Delannoy |
| 1958 | The Roots of Heaven | the Baron | John Huston |
| 1959 | Nina | Un inspecteur | Jean Boyer |
| 1960 | Les Scélérats | Arthur Martin | Robert Hossein |
| 1961 | Dans l'eau qui fait des bulles | Inspector Guillaume | Maurice Delbez |
| 1962 | La Vendetta | Monsieur Lauriston | Jean Chérasse |
| 1964 | Marvelous Angelique | the dentist | Bernard Borderie |
| 1968 | A Flea in Her Ear | Louis, the oncle of Max | Jacques Charon |
| 1972 | Not Dumb, The Bird | Maître Weidman, le notaire | Jean Delannoy |
| 1974 | Antoine and Sebastian | Géraldi | Jean-Marie Périer |
