= Véronique Zuber =

French model and actress (1936–2024)

- Born: 23 January 1936; Seine-Port, France
- Died: 10 October 2024 (aged 88); Saint-Brice-sous-Forêt, France
- Occupations: Model; actress

Véronique Zuber (23 January 1936 – 10 October 2024) was a French model and actress who was named Miss France in 1955.

== Life and career ==
Born in Seine-Port on 23 January 1936, Zuber was elected Miss Paris in 1954 when she was 18. The selection process for Miss France 1955 took place at the Théâtre de Fontainebleau, which was reported on by Radiodiffusion-Télévision Française, which saw Zuber elected with 86 votes to Miss Côte d'Azur Monique Lambert's 81.

Following her pageant victory, Zuber pursued an acting career, appearing in films such as Dishonorable Discharge and The Gendarme of Champignol. She went on to marry Russian prince Georges de Bibikoff, with whom she had two children: Alexis and Natacha.

Zuber died in Saint-Brice-sous-Forêt on 10 October 2024, at the age of 88.

== Filmography ==
- Frou-Frou (1955)
- La vie est belle (1956)
- Mademoiselle and Her Gang (1957)
- Dishonorable Discharge (1957)
- Les Motards (1959)
- The Gendarme of Champignol (1959)
