= The Gendarme of Champignol =

1959 film

- Directed by: Jean Bastia
- Written by: Roger Pierre
- Produced by: Marcel Roux
- Starring: Jean Richard; Roger Pierre; Noël Roquevert
- Cinematography: Marc Fossard
- Edited by: Jacques Desagneaux
- Music by: Richard Cornu; Paul Misraki
- Production company: Chronos Films
- Distributed by: Cinédis
- Release date: 27 May 1959
- Running time: 90 minutes
- Country: France
- Language: French

The Gendarme of Champignol (French: Le gendarme de Champignol) is a 1959 comedy film directed by Jean Bastia and starring Jean Richard, Roger Pierre and Noël Roquevert. It also featured Véronique Zuber, the 1955 Miss France winner. Location shooting took place around Val-d'Oise. The film's sets were designed by the art director Jean Mandaroux. It is a sequel to the 1957 film Nous autres à Champignol and was followed by Le caïd de Champignol a third and final entry in the series in 1966.

== Synopsis ==
Claudius Binoche is a gendarme in Champignol, falls in love with the new post office girl Suzette Binoche. When she disappears after receiving a mysterious telegram from the village of Buzy, Claudius secures a transfer there. The area is haunted by a notorious robber, who turns out to be none other than Suzette's brother Vittorio.

== Cast ==
- Jean Richard as Claudius Binoche
- Roger Pierre as Vittorio - le bandit de la colline aux oiseaux
- Noël Roquevert as Le capitaine de gendarmerie Raspec
- Véronique Zuber as Suzette Binoche
- Nadine Basile as Suzette Grégorio
- Alfred Adam as M. Grégoire 'Grégorio' - le maire
- Jacques Dynam as Le gendarme Ratinet
- Jack Ary as Le droguiste
- Mag-Avrilas La postière
- Florence Blot as Une vendeuse
- Charles Bouillaud as L'adjudant Fournier
- Mario David as Un homme au restaurant
- Alexandre Dréan as Le docteur
- Max Elloy as Le gendarme La Huchette
- Robert Rollis as Antoine
- Jean-Paul Rouland as Le pharmacien

== Bibliography ==
- Chanoinat, Philippe & Da Costa, Charles. En compagnie des gendarmes. Glénat BD, 2016.
- Chion, Michel. Words on Screen. Columbia University Press, 2017.
