= Mick Micheyl =

French singer-songwriter and sculptor (1922–2019)

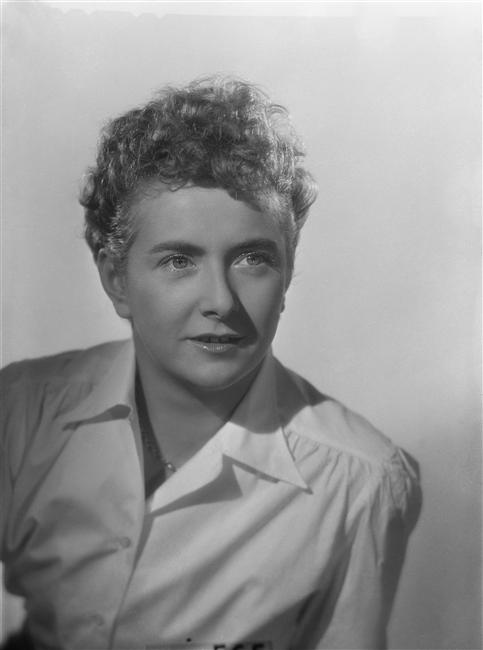
- Born: Paulette Michey; 8 February 1922; Lyon, France
- Died: 16 May 2019 (aged 97); Montmerle-sur-Saône, France

Mick Micheyl (born Paulette Michey; 8 February 1922 – 16 May 2019) was a French singer-songwriter and sculptor. Her songs won a number of national awards and she was considered the leading star of French song in the 1950s and 60s.

== Biography ==
Micheyl was born Paulette Michey in Lyon in 1922 and studied at the Ecole Lyonnaise des Beaux-Arts; she started her career as a painter. In 1949 her song Le Marchand de Poésie (The Poetry Merchant), won a French song contest and she moved to Paris to become a singer. She recorded her first album with Pathé-Marconi Records in 1950, and sang in nightclubs and cabarets in the city such as Casino de Paris. Another of her songs, Un gamin de Paris (A child from Paris), was widely acclaimed. In 1953 she won the Grand Prix du Disque of the Académie Charles-Cros with her song Ni toi ni moi (Neither You Nor Me). She also appeared in a number of French films, including Little Jacques in 1953 and Paris Music-Hall in 1957.

In the 1960s Micheyl became a television producer and presenter. She discovered and helped launch the careers of French performers such as Dave, Véronique Sanson and Michel Fugain.

In 1974 she left the entertainment industry and became a sculptor, specializing in steelwork. In 2009 she was forced to stop working with steel as a number of accidents in her studio had made her lose some of her eyesight. Her work included monuments and public art in Villefranche-sur-Saône and Caluire-et-Cuire. Her work is also held in the permanent collection of Musée Masséna in Nice.

In 1991 Micheyl published her autobiography, Dieu est-il bien dans ma peau?

Micheyl died in Montmerle-sur-Saône, in Ain on 16 May 2019.

=== Legacy ===
The primary school in the town she retired to, Montmerle-sur-Saône, was renamed in her honour.

=== Cœur d'Acier (Heart of Steel) ===
Regarding Micheyl Art works "As far as it is known, the idea of making artwork on stainless steel plates, was born in Lyon, France, in the early '80s, by the hands and inventiveness of Mick Micheyl, also called 'Cœur d'Acier' or 'heart of steel', an international well known painter since the '50s. In 1973 she had her first exposure, and to everyone's surprise, Mick Micheyl canceled all promising tours and TV shows to devote herself entirely to her true pation: the visual arts. "I Draw with light. I try to express the life and movement. The movement of a running man, or the movement of time in a forest as the day goes on"- citing herself. At 87 years of age, Mick Micheyl made her last exhibition in October 2010. But her retirement has nothing to do with the beautiful age she reached... According to the media, while working in her studio, a steel filing was projected into one of her eyes. The filing was removed in a delicate surgical intervention, but unfortunately it also took off some visual capacity, which forced her to withdraw this artistic activity. As she later explained, this unfortunate accident occurred in a rare moment she forgot to use the protective goggles... Metal engraving pioneer and stern figure of this kind of art, Mick Micheyl achieved a high degree of quality and perfection, with creations of great merit and much appreciated by the public!".
