= Miss Shumway Goes West =

1962 film by Jean Jabely

- French: Une blonde comme ça
- Directed by: Jean Jabely
- Written by: Félicien Marceau; Jacques Robert; James Hadley Chase
- Starring: René Lefèvre; Robert Manuel; Jess Hahn; Tania Béryl
- Release date: 1962
- Running time: 106 minute
- Countries: Argentina; France
- Languages: Spanish; French

Miss Shumway Goes West (French: Une blonde comme ça) is a 1962 French-Argentine film.

== Cast ==
- René Lefèvre
- Robert Manuel
- Tania Béryl
- Jess Hahn
- Sophie Hardy
- France Anglade
- Gillian Hills

== See also ==
- Rough Magic (1995)
