= Tintin and the Golden Fleece =

1961 film

- Theatrical poster
- Directed by: Jean-Jacques Vierne
- Written by: André Barret; Rémo Forlani
- Produced by: André Barret
- Starring: Jean-Pierre Talbot; Georges Wilson
- Cinematography: Raymond Pierre Lemoigne
- Edited by: Léonide Azar
- Music by: André Popp
- Distributed by: Pathé (France)
- Release date: 6 December 1961 (France)
- Running time: 102 minutes
- Country: France
- Languages: French, Turkish, Greek, English (dubbed)

Tintin and the Golden Fleece (in the original French, Tintin et le mystère de la toison d'or, meaning Tintin and the Mystery of the Golden Fleece) is a film first released in France on 6 December 1961. Featuring characters from The Adventures of Tintin comic book series written and drawn by the Belgian writer-artist Hergé, it was a live-action film with actors made-up to look like the characters and featured an original storyline not based on any of the books.

The film is set in Turkey and Greece with the main characters of Tintin, Captain Haddock and Professor Calculus searching for a treasure after inheriting a ship called the Golden Fleece. The film was followed by a less successful sequel, Tintin and the Blue Oranges.

== Plot ==
Captain Haddock learns that an old shipmate, Paparanic, has died and left him a strange ship, the Golden Fleece. Tintin, Snowy and the Captain travel to Istanbul only to find it's an old cargo ship in a dilapidated state. On board, they meet the ship's cook Clodion, and Paparanic's pet parrot Romulus. A businessman named Anton Karabine arrives and says he is an old friend of the Captain's shipmate. He offers them a "sentimental" price for the ship. And they give Captain Haddock fifteen days to think it over.

While touring Istanbul, there are several attempts on their lives, and determined to find out what is going on, Haddock decides to keep the ship. One of the clauses of Paparanic's will was that on accepting the ship, they also fulfill its current obligations, so after hiring 3 crewmen – Angorapoulos, Attila and Yefima, they set off for Athens to deliver the cargo. During the journey Tintin catches Angorapoulos searching through the papers Tintin found. Tintin beats him up, and locks him in a room. But then later, they find that one of the lifeboats has gone, and Angorapoulos escaped.

In Athens, Tintin and Haddock go to the carpet seller Midas Papos, who turns out to be another of Paparanic's old shipmates. Grief-stricken to learn of his friend's death, he is shot by a man through the window before he can relate any information. Caught holding the gun, Tintin and Haddock are arrested but released thanks to the arrival of the policemen Thomson and Thompson, and on Papos' word, who is alive and recovering in hospital.

Tintin finds an old newspaper article showing that in their youth, Paparanic, Papos, Karabine, plus two strangers, were adventurers who were involved in a coup in the Latin American republic of Tetaragua, and formed a short-lived government. The article includes a photo of the five men.

Tintin later spots Angorapoulos in a barber's shop and follows him to the local offices of Karexport, which is run by Karabine. Trailing him by car, Tintin, Snowy and Haddock follow him to a village in the countryside where Angorapoulous and some accomplices kidnap a musician at a wedding. Chasing them on a motorbike, the crooks' car is forced off the road, and the villains flee on foot. Saving the kidnap victim, Scoubidouvitch, he is revealed as the fourth man in the photo. He suffers from "memory loss", but for 1000 drachmas reveals that a large amount of gold is involved, and suggests that Tintin and Haddock consult the fifth man in the photo, Alexandre who now lives in San Stefano monastery in Meteora.

Travelling there, they find the former adventurer is now Father Alexandre, as he has repented and become a monk. He reveals the rest of the Tetaragua story: when forced out, they'd taken a large quantity of gold from the central bank, and that Captain Paparanic had kept half while the others split the rest. Before departing, Father Alexandre gives Tintin and Haddock a bottle of wine which Paparanic gave him while visiting him last Christmas, and told him to drink only after his death. When Haddock accidentally breaks the bottle, the label is discovered to be a map to the location of Paparanic's gold.

Tintin and Haddock return to the Golden Fleece, where Professor Cuthbert Calculus has arrived to join them. Secretly, Yefima drains the fuel to prevent the ship from leaving port, but Tintin discovers him and throws him overboard in another bout of judo. Fortunately, Calculus has invented a special tablet called "Super-Cuthbertoleum" which, mixed with the remaining fuel, is more than enough to enable the ship to reach their destination, the island of Thassika.

The map includes an X just off the island's coast and, using his pendulum, Calculus locates the gold's location. Diving underwater, Tintin discovers a sea-chest filled with long, oddly shaped bars of gold. No sooner have the members of the Golden Fleece got the chest out of the water than they are held at gunpoint by Karabine, Angorapoulos, Yefima and their men who'd snuck aboard. Haddock gets caught up in a fishing net, Snowy gets tied up and Tintin is shot at and falls back into the water, left for dead. The companions are locked in a cabin, and explosives placed to blow up the ship.

Karabine and his men take the chest back to their helicopter only to come under attack by the police, including Thomson and Thompson, led by Attila who is revealed to be an undercover police officer. Karabine gets aboard the helicopter, which suddenly takes off; Tintin has dispatched the pilot and is flying. Karabine pulls a gun, but Tintin disarms him. Beaten, the crook declares that no-one will get the gold, opens a hatch and lets the chest fall into the sea.

The rest of the gang surrender to the police. Aboard the ship, Snowy manages to get loose, and rolls on the fuse to put it out, saving the companions.

With Tintin back on board, Calculus, using his pendulum, insists that the gold is still right below them, despite the sea-chest being too deep to recover. Thinking of the words in Paparanic's will, Tintin chips away at the paint on the ship's oddly shaped railings to find they are in fact solid gold, painted over. The chest had contained the original copper railings, and was just a red herring.

Back home at Marlinspike Hall, a package arrives from Tetaragua announcing the main square in the capital is renamed Paparanic Square, and bestowing on Haddock their highest decoration, the Order of the Scarlet Cheetah, as thanks for returning the gold. As the film ends, the local band helps Tintin, Snowy, Haddock, Nestor, and Clodion (their new cook) celebrate, while Calculus displays his latest invention: a flying birdcage for the parrot Romulus.

== Cast ==
- Jean-Pierre Talbot as Tintin
- Georges Wilson as Captain Archibald Haddock
- Georges Loriot as Professor Cuthbert Calculus
- Charles Vanel as Father Alexandre
- Darío Moreno as Midas Papos
- Dimos Starenios as Scoubidouvitch
- Ulvi Uraz as Malik
- Marcel Bozzuffi as Angorapoulos
- Dimitris Myrat as Karabine (as Demetrios Myrat)
- Henri Soya as Clodion
- Max Elloy as Nestor
- Serge Marquand as the postman
- Michel Thomass as Yéfime
- Dora Stratou as Panegyrist

The actors playing Thomson and Thompson are listed as "incognito" in the end credits (Pedro Gamonal and Pablo Gamonal were the actors).

Snowy the dog is credited as Milou, which is his original French name.

Marcel Bozzuffi, who plays the thug Angorapoulos, is best known as the hitman pursued in the famous car chase and shot by Gene Hackman in The French Connection.

== Notes ==
"Karabine" is a pun on "carabine", the French for "rifle", a hint that the character may be an arms dealer, though his business is called "Karexport" ("car-export"). The crocodile that symbolises the company (but which is red and facing leftwards) is similar to the logo of Lacoste clothing.

"Scoubidouvitch" comes from the term Scoubidou which was popular at the time.

== Home media ==
Kino Lorber released a double feature DVD and Blu-Ray of Tintin and the Golden Fleece, alongside Tintin and the Blue Oranges on July 11, 2023.

== Book version ==
The film was made into a book, in French, English, Portuguese and Spanish. Unlike most of the Tintin books, including that of the animated film Tintin and the Lake of Sharks, it is not in comic strip form, but is made up of written text with stills from the film, some in colour, others in black and white. Today, the English translation is highly sought after by collectors.
