= National Board of Review Awards 1966 =

Annual US film awards ceremony

38th National Board of Review Awards
January 10, 1967
Best Film: A Man for All Seasons

The 38th National Board of Review Awards were announced on January 10, 1967.

== Top Ten Films ==
1. A Man for All Seasons
2. Born Free
3. Alfie
4. Who's Afraid of Virginia Woolf?
5. The Bible: In the Beginning...
6. Georgy Girl
7. John F. Kennedy: Years of Lightning, Day of Drums
8. It Happened Here
9. The Russians Are Coming, the Russians Are Coming
10. Shakespeare Wallah

== Top Foreign Films ==
1. The Sleeping Car Murders
2. The Gospel According to St. Matthew
3. The Shameless Old Lady
4. A Man and a Woman
5. Hamlet

== Winners ==
- Best Film: A Man for All Seasons
- Best Foreign Film: The Sleeping Car Murders
- Best Actor: Paul Scofield (A Man for All Seasons)
- Best Actress: Elizabeth Taylor (Who's Afraid of Virginia Woolf?)
- Best Supporting Actor: Robert Shaw (A Man for All Seasons)
- Best Supporting Actress: Vivien Merchant (Alfie)
- Best Director: Fred Zinnemann (A Man for All Seasons)
