= Robert Sexé =

French explorer and photographer

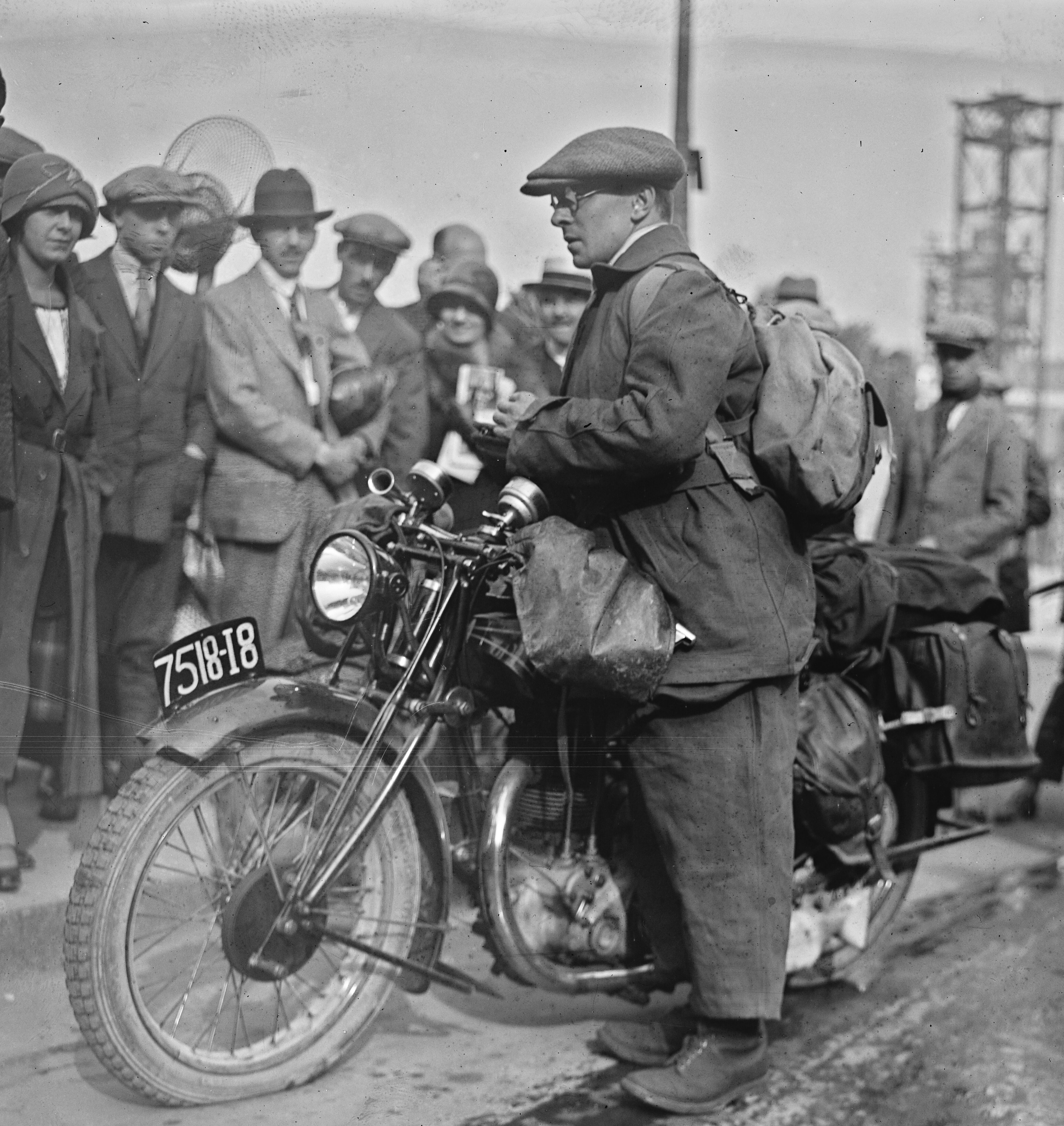
- Robert Sexé leaving for Scandinavia on a motorbike, 1928
- Born: 17 November 1890; La Roche-sur-Yon
- Died: 1986; Poitiers
- Occupations: Reporter, photographer

Robert Sexé (17 November 1890 – 1986) was a French reporter, motorcyclist, photographer and globetrotter. His travels around the world are considered to be an inspiration for the comic character Tintin. He was a reporter for La Moto, La Revue de Automobile, and Le Petit Parisien.

== Early life ==
Robert Sexé was born in La Roche-sur-Yon, in Western France. He was raised by his father's brother as he was orphaned at a very young age. He studied at French-based Jesuit College of St. Joseph and received a Bachelor of Letters in 1907. He then moved to London to study at the London School of Economics, where he read Economics. He purchased his first motorcycle in 1912. The short-lived newspaper The Daily Citizen hired Sexé to be a special correspondent for the Balkan Wars. Sexé was a reporter during World War I.

== Around-the-world trips ==
Before he made several trips across the world including travelling the Soviet Union in 1926 on a motorcycle, Robert Sexe served as a team member for the young brand Soyer & Cie and participated in the Tour de France 1921 and 1922 on a Soyer 2,5 HP. He also visited the Belgian Congo and the United States. His exploits and photographs were printed in many newspapers across France and Belgium. He received notable press attention when he would visit a country including Russia, Japan, and the United States.

In 1926, Sexé, along with Henri Andrieux, travelled 35,000 kilometres (22,000 mi) around the world with their Belgian built Gillet Herstal motorcycles. They left Paris on 14 June and ended their trip in Brussels on 3 December. They received cooperation from the Soviet government in their travels in the USSR, with fuel being placed in convenient areas for them to refill their bikes.

== Tintin ==
Sexé's travels, use of motorcycles, and his similar appearance were all mirrored in Tintin's first two adventures. Herge, the creator of Tintin, started drawing the character in 1929 setting his first adventure in the Soviet Union. Tintin in the Land of the Soviets, came almost three years after Sexé had travelled the country. Sexé's photos of his travels in the country were printed in Belgian newspapers, where Herge resided. According to the BBC documentary Tintin's Adventure with Frank Gardner, some of the photos that Sexé took match what Herge would later draw, replacing Sexé with Tintin. Tintin was even depicted riding the same model motorcycle, the Belgian-made Gillet Herstal, that Sexé rode across the Soviet Union. The Hergé Foundation in Belgium has admitted that it is not too hard to imagine how Hergé could have been influenced by the exploits of Sexé. The creator of Tintin never revealed who inspired his characters.

== Later life ==
During World War II, Sexé wrote articles for La Gerbe, a French collaborationist weekly newspaper that promoted Vichy or Nazi beliefs.

Sexé died in 1986 in Poitiers, France.
