= Pascal Bastia =

- Born: Pascal Simoni; 11 September 1908; Paris, France
- Died: 12 July 2007 (aged 98); Saint-Privat-des-Prés, Dordogne
- Occupations: Composer; songwriter

Pascal Bastia (11 September 1908 – 12 July 2007) was a 20th-century French operetta composer, songwriter and screenwriter.

== Biography ==
Pascal Bastia was the son of chansonnier-songwriter, singer, actor, filmmaker Jean Bastia (1878-1940), born in a family from the Corsican village of Vescovato. The cartoonist Georges Bastia and the film director Jean Bastia were his brothers.

He made his debut aged 19 with two works written under the pseudonym Irving Paris, Ma Femme (1927) and Un joli monsieur, but encountered real success under his real name with the operetta Dix-neuf ans (1933). This play was the first to be inspired by light jazz introduced in France by Mireille and the Quintette du Hot Club de France around Stéphane Grappelli and Django Reinhardt. The latter appeared in the orchestra that accompanied the recordings of the play. In 1933, Dix-neuf ans was given 300 times at the Théâtre Daunou. The cast was composed of Éliane de Creus (later replaced by Suzy Delair) and Jean Sablon, surrounded by Lily Mounet, Jean Bastia, Reda Caire and some debutantes including Viviane Romance. The work was performed in the provinces, in Amsterdam and Oran. There were more than 1,500 performances.

After the war, Pascal Bastia continued his career with ups and downs, mostly in the provinces with Mademoiselle Star (1945) or Gardes françaises (Reims, 1962). This last play was closer to opéra comique, like Georges van Parys's or Maurice Yvain's latest works. But he would never again find the success of Dix-neuf ans.

Pascal Bastia was one of the first composers to not orchestrate his own scores, the American way: Ma Femme was orchestrated by André Sablon (elder brother of John), Un joli Monsieur by Mac Curthy, Dix-neuf ans by Jef de Murel and Michel Emer. On the other hand, he wrote most librettos and lyrics for his operettas.

A singer-songwriter, his song were interpreted by the greatest: Jean Sablon, Joséphine Baker, Luc Barney. He also was the author of music and film scripts. He wrote the comedy Ce monde n'est pas pour les anges (1950, Théâtre Édouard VII).

== Main works ==
- 1927: Ma femme
- 1928: Un joli monsieur
- 1933: Dix neuf ans
- 1935: Le Groom s'en chargera
- 1941: La Star et le champion
- 1945: Mademoiselle Star
- 1947: Quel beau voyage!
- 1947: Perdigal
- 1949: Priscilla
- 1951: Ma Louisiane
- 1953: Valets de cœur
- 1957: Nouvelle Orléans
- 1962: Les Gardes Françaises
- 1973: Joli tambour
- 1981: Le Chant du Far-West
- 2000: L' Oncle du Brésil

== Screenwriter ==
- 1960: Les Tortillards
- 1962: La Vendetta
- 1962: Un clair de lune à Maubeuge
