= Certains l'aiment froide =

1960 film

- Directed by: Jean Bastia; Guy Lionel
- Written by: Jean Bastia; Guy Lionel
- Produced by: Kerfrance Production (France)
- Starring: Louis de Funès; Pierre Dudan
- Music by: Pierre Dudan
- Distributed by: Les Films Fernand Rivers
- Release date: 17 February 1960 (France)
- Running time: 90 minutes
- Country: France
- Language: French

Certains l'aiment froide, is a French comedy film from 1960, directed by Jean Bastia, written by Guy Lionel, starring Louis de Funès. The film is known under the title: "Les râleurs font leur beurre" (alternative French title).

== Plot ==
July 4, 1759. The Count de La Tour, Marquis of Valmorin, dies, leaving a will specifying that it cannot be opened for 200 years. Furthermore, his fortune will only pass to the descendant who has an incurable disease.

To have a chance of recovering the loot for their respective families, the main creditor, Galopin, and the Marquis's notary, Maître Leboiteux, plan to have at least one descendant present at the opening of the will, so that they can seize the fortune for their own family.

July 4, 1959, in Geneva. While Leboiteux and his partner, Meyer, wish to plunder the heirs for a "charitable cause," the Marquis's descendants arrive from all over the world to attend the opening of the famous will. Pierre is from Switzerland, Luigi from Italy, Ingrid from Denmark, Mathilde from France, William from the United States, Hannibal from Africa, and Smith from Scotland.

Upon learning of the billion dollar fortune, Smith dies of a heart attack. However, the will specifies that only a terminally ill person will benefit from the fortune. After Smith's burial, Hannibal falls seriously ill and prefers to return home, renouncing the inheritance. The remaining potential heirs then consider using the most improbable schemes to win the jackpot.

William Valmorin tries to pass himself off as mad, Mathilde Valmorin as deaf. Ingrid Valmorin believes her cellulitis is incurable; as for Luigi Valmorin, he directly seduces a nurse who will pass him off as ill. Only Pierre Valmorin, despite the efforts of his fiancée Ariel, resists all infections.

On the day of the medical examination, William is declared insane and irresponsible; his fortune slips away and he is committed to an asylum. Mathilde's scheme is discovered, and Ingrid's arguments are rejected. Only Luigi and Pierre are declared truly incurable, but Luigi is confounded by the hospital doctor, where he had attempted to smuggle a fake X-ray.

Pierre thus inherits, but apparently has a serious heart condition; Galopin is quick to take care of his needs. He has the Valmorin family's former estate luxuriously restored, and also takes care of Pierre's in-laws.

In prison, Luigi is diagnosed with a serious heart condition, which is in fact the one Pierre was supposed to be suffering from: the X-rays had been swapped during Luigi's "visit" to the hospital. While Pierre is thus disinherited, Luigi is no better off, as the will stipulates that the heir must have no civil or military convictions.

While Leboiteux and Meyer are rubbing their hands, since there is no longer a possible heir, Jérôme Valmorin, an African explorer who has been informed of the will by Hannibal, arrives. He shares the remainder of his inheritance with Hannibal, which drives Leboiteux mad, to the point of keeping William Valmorin company. Once Pierre's expenses, the tax bill, and Galopin's are settled, Jérôme receives the remainder of his inheritance: two francs.

== Cast ==
- Louis de Funès : Ange Galopin, the creditor who wants to recover silver
- Pierre Dudan : Pierre Valmorin, Swiss compositor
- Robert Manuel : Luigi Valmorin
- Francis Blanche : William, Foster Valmorin, American
- Noël Roquevert : Maître Albert Leboiteux, notary
- Jean Richard : Jérôme Valmorin, the explorer
- Mathilde Casadesus : Mathilde Valmorin, cultivator
- Mireille Perrey : mum of Pierre
- Françoise Béguin : Ariel
- Guy Nelson : Tony, the singer
- Habib Benglia : Hannibal Valmorin, African
- Nicky Valor : Ingrid Valmorin, the Danish
- Jean-Paul Rouland : the doctor Schuster
- Léonce Corne : Maître Meyer, the associate of mister Leboiteux
- Harry Max : the director of the asylum Saint-Vincent
- Max Elloy : Simpson, le majordome particulier de Pierre
- Mario David : Le masseur
- Albert Daumergue : doctor of the prison
- Marie-Pierre Gauthey "Casey" : the nurse
- Pierre Duncan : a security guard of the prison
