= La Vendetta (film) =

- Directed by: Jean Chérasse
- Written by: Albert Valentin; Pascal Bastia
- Produced by: Nino Costantini
- Starring: Francis Blanche; Louis de Funès
- Cinematography: Roland Pontoizeau
- Edited by: Georges Arnstam
- Music by: Derry Hall
- Production companies: Le Trident, S.I.F.E.C (Paris); M.E.C Cinematografica (Rome)
- Distributed by: Rank
- Release date: 18 April 1962 (France)
- Running time: 90 minutes
- Countries: Italy; France
- Language: French

La Vendetta English: The Vendetta, is a French comedy film from 1962, directed by Jean Chérasse, written by Albert Valentin, starring Francis Blanche and Louis de Funès. The film was known under the titles: "Bandito sì... ma d'onore" (Italy), "The Vendetta" (international English title).

== Cast ==
- Francis Blanche : Le capitaine Bartoli, a candidate for the town hall
- Louis de Funès : Valentino Amoretti, the robber of honour and father of Antonia
- Marisa Merlini : the postal worker
- Olivier Hussenot : Mr Lauriston, the gentle rentier
- Jean Lefebvre : Colombo, a supporter of Bartoli
- Rosy Varte : Mrs Marthe Lauriston, wife of the rentier
- Jean Hoube : Michel Lauriston, the nephew
- Christian Mery : the teacher, supporter of Bartoli
- Charles Blavette : Sosthène, a supporter of Corti
- Noël Rochiccioli : Colonna
- Juan Vilato : the partisan singer of Mr Lauriston
- Geneviève Galéa : Antonia Amoretti, the daughter
- Jacqueline Pierreux : the tourist, friend of captain
- Elisa Mainardi : daughter of Bastia
- Mario Carotenuto : Corti, a candidate for the town hall
- Jacqueline Doyen : (uncredited)
- Tintin pasqualini : (uncredited)
