= Little Jacques (1953 film) =

1953 film by Robert Bibal

- Directed by: Robert Bibal
- Written by: Jules Clarétie (novel); Robert Bettoni; Robert Bibal; Michel Dulud
- Produced by: André Roy
- Starring: Jean-Pierre Kérien; Blanchette Brunoy; Christian Fourcade
- Cinematography: Pierre Dolley
- Edited by: Gabriel Rongier
- Music by: Louiguy; Mick Micheyl
- Production company: Roy Films
- Distributed by: L'Union des Producteurs de Films
- Release date: 3 September 1953
- Running time: 105 minutes
- Country: France
- Language: French

Little Jacques (French: Le petit Jacques) is a 1953 French drama film directed by Robert Bibal and starring Jean-Pierre Kérien, Blanchette Brunoy and Christian Fourcade.

== Cast ==
- Jean-Pierre Kérien as Noël Rambert
- Blanchette Brunoy as Marthe Rambert
- Christian Fourcade as Le petit Jacques Rambert
- Howard Vernon as Daniel Mortal
- Micheline Francey as Claire Mortal
- Célia Cortez as Mlle Edmée, l'assistante
- Pierre Jourdan as Paul Laverdac
- Jean Tissier as Le juge d'instruction Dubois
- Jacques Charon as L'avocat de la défense Me. Merlin
- Lucien Nat as Le procureur
- Charles Roy as Le docteur Dr. Arthez
- Odette Barencey as La concierge
- Charles Bayard as Un actionnaire
- Louise Bazin
- Robert Charlet
- Emile Dars
- Paul Demange as Le vieux beau
- Pierre Larquey
- Charles Lemontier as L'aumônier
- Mag-Avril as La caissière
- Jacques Mattler
- Mick Micheyl as La chanteuse
- Jean-Michel Rankovitch as Gobergeau
- Guy Saint-Clair
- André Saint-Luc
- Gabriel Sardet as Le président

== Bibliography ==
- Parish, Robert. Film Actors Guide. Scarecrow Press, 1977.
