= Michel Dulud =

- Born: 11 January 1902; 11th arrondissement of Paris
- Died: 4 March 1997 (aged 95); Avallon

Michel Dulud (11 January 1902 – 4 March 1997), was a French playwright, screenwriter and film director.

He passed his military pilot's license in 1936, and gave lectures on the beginnings of aeronautics, before becoming a playwright, performed in Paris (Théâtre Fontaine) and in New York. He also tried his hand at cinema as a screenwriter and directed two films.

== Theater ==
- 1937: La nuit du 7 (premiered at Théâtre Français of New-York in February then at théâtre des Capucines de Paris in May)
- 1939: Le Revenant (at Théâtre des capucines in February)
- 1942: On demande (at Théâtre Antoine in June)
- 1944: Monseigneur (at Théâtre Daunou in April)
- 1947: Tous les deux (at Théâtre Antoine in March)
- 1949: Deux coqs vivaient en paix (after a tale by La Fontaine, premiered at Théâtre Monceau in December)
- 1952: Back Street (after Fannie Hurst, premiered at Brussels, then at Théâtre Fontaine in Paris, in April)
- 1956: Les Inconsolables (at Théâtre du Vieux Colombier in April, with an act by Michel Dulud en lisant Maupassant)

== Filmography ==
- 1946: La Troisième Dalle (script & direction)
- 1949: Tous les deux (adaptation & dialogues, based on the play Tous les deux)
- 1950: Banco de prince (script & direction, based on the play Monseigneur)
- 1951: Never Two Without Three (script & dialogues)
- 1952: Allô... je t'aime
- 1953: Little Jacques (dialogues)
- 1954: Ma petite folie
- 1955: Villa sans souci (screenwriter)
- 1959: Soupe au lait (script)

== Bibliography ==
- 1953: La Famille Duraton - Published under the pseudonym "Saint-Marre"
- 1958: Du Guesclin - Published under the pseudonym "Michel Dulud"
