= Jean-Jacques Vierne =

Jean-Jacques Vierne (31 January 1921, in Courbevoie, France – 17 June 2003) was a French film director.

== Filmography ==
- Rififi (1955, assistant director)
- No Time for Ecstasy (1961)
- Tintin and the Golden Fleece (1961)
- À nous deux Paris (1966)
