= Lucien Laurent Bonheur =

Lucien Laurent Bonheur (25 June 1864 – 14 August 1918) was a French-American Progressive and theatrical promoter. He was President of the French Drama Society.

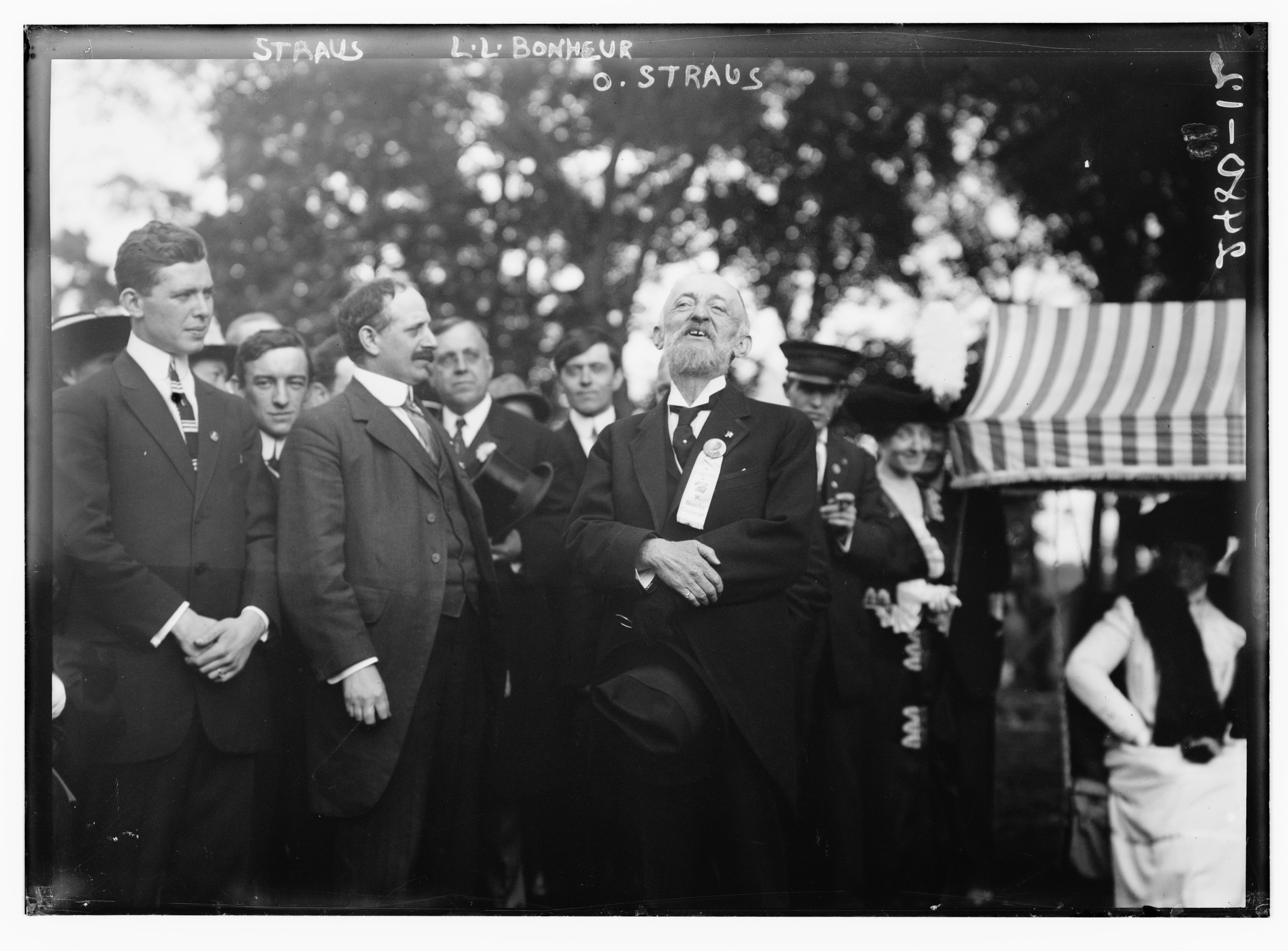

Born in Paris, Bonheur immigrated to the United States in 1886. He became a naturalized citizen in 1891. He died in Great Neck, Long Island, New York in 1918, aged 54.

== Archive ==
His papers are archived at Ohio State University.
