= Les Tortillards =

- Directed by: Jean Bastia
- Written by: Jean Bastia; Pascal Bastia
- Produced by: Horizons Cinématographiques (France)
- Starring: Jean Richard; Louis de Funès
- Music by: Louiguy
- Release date: 30 December 1960 (France)
- Running time: 82 minutes
- Country: France
- Language: French
- Box office: $9.3 million

Les Tortillards English: Small local trains, is a French comedy film from 1960, directed by Jean Bastia, written by Pierre Gaspard-Huit, starring Jean Richard and Louis de Funès. The film was known under the titles: "Io... mio figlio e la fidanzata" (Italy), "Der Umstandskrämer" (East Germany).

== Cast ==
- Jean Richard : César Beauminet, manager of the theatrical troops
- Roger Pierre : Gérard Durand, the son
- Louis de Funès : Emile Durand, créateur de la bombe insecticide "Cicéron"
- Danièle Lebrun : Suzy Beauminet, daughter of César
- Madeleine Barbulée : Adélaïde Benoit, the aunt of Gérard
- Jeanne Helly : Marguerite Durand, wife of Emile
- Annick Tanguy : Fanny Raymond, the companion of César
- Robert Rollis : Ernest, a man of the troupe
- Billy Bourbon : Albert Albert, the acrobat of the troops
- Max Desrau : "Pépé", the painter of the troops
- Christian Marin : Léon, Emile's colleague
- Nono Zammit : Paulo, the props man
