= Jean Chérasse =

French film director (1932–2025)

- Born: Jean André Chérasse; 26 November 1932; Issoire, France
- Died: 18 April 2025 (aged 92); Saint-Pierre-de-Bailleul, Eure, France
- Education: Lycée Henri-IV; IDHEC
- Occupations: Film director, screenwriter

Jean Chérasse (26 November 1932 – 18 April 2025) was a French film director, producer and screenwriter. He died on 18 April 2025, at the age of 92.

== Filmography ==
- Henri Frenay, l'inventeur de la résistance (2003)
- Marthe Richard et la tolérance (1996)
- Le Grand Retour (1995)
- France, année zéro (1994)
- La Marseillaise n'est pas encore enrouée ! (1992 with Claude Manceron)
- Le Miroir colonial (1988)
- Le Miroir des passions françaises (1986 with Theodore Zeldin)
- Les Captifs de l'An Quarante (1985)
- Paris, j'écris ton nom liberté (1984)
- La Prise du pouvoir par Philippe Pétain (1980)
- Dreyfus ou l'intolérable vérité (prix Méliès 1975)
- Valmy (1967 with Abel Gance)
- Un clair de lune à Maubeuge (1962)
- La Vendetta (1961)
- Un charlatan crépusculaire (1958 with Gérard Philipe)
