= Jean Bastia =

Jean Bastia (21 February 1919 in Bastia, Corsica – 16 October 2005), was a French film director, screenwriter and film producer.

== Biography ==
The true identity of Jean Bastia, born in Paris —where his father, Jean Bastia (1878–1940), was an actor and playwright—remained unknown for a long time. His family was of Corsican origin, from Vescovato, Haute-Corse. The Simoni family came from Figari and had settled in Vescovato in the early 19th century. They held the office of court clerk.

Jean Bastia was a popular director who, on several occasions, directed actors such as Louis de Funès and Jean Richard (actor).

== Filmography ==
=== Director ===
- We at Champignol (1957)
- Adventures in Indochina (1958)
- The Gendarme of Champignol (1959)
- Certains l'aiment froide (1960)
- Les Tortillards (1960)
- Dynamite Jack (1961)
- Le Caïd de Champignol (1966)
- ...Et mourir de désir (1974)
- Réseau secret (1976)

=== Writer ===
- We at Champignol (1957)
- Les Tortillards (1960)
- Dynamite Jack (1961)
- Le Caïd de Champignol (1966)
- Réseau secret (1967)

=== Producer ===
- Moi, fleur bleue (1977)
- Ça va pas la tête (1978)
- Salut ... J'arrive (1982)
- Clash (1984)
