= C'est si bon (album) =

Studio album by Arielle Dombasle
- Released: October 17, 2006
- Label: Columbia

Professional ratings
Review scores
Source	Rating
Allmusic	3/5 stars

C'est si bon is an album by Arielle Dombasle released in 2006 by Columbia Records.

== Tracks ==
1. "C'est Magnifique" (Cole Porter, François Llenas) – 3:03
2. "C'est si bon" (André Hornez, Jerry Seelen, Henri Betti) – 2:52
3. "Tico Tico" (Zequinha de Abreu) – 2:13
4. "Relax-ay-voo" (Sammy Cahn, Arthur Schwartz) –2:54
5. "Dream A Little Dream Of Me" (Gus Kahn, Fabian Andre, Wilbur Schwandt) – 2:45
6. "Cheek to Cheek" (Irving Berlin) – 2:24
7. "Que Sera, Sera" (Ray Evans, Jay Livingston) – 2:22
8. "A Fine Romance" (Dorothy Fields, Jerome Kern) – 2:55
9. "Moi, je m'ennuie" (Camille François, Wal-Berg) – 3:44
10. "Paris in Delight" (Arielle Dombasle, Jean-Pascal Beintus) – 2:47
11. "South American Way" (Al Dubin, Jimmy McHugh) – 2:17
12. "The Boys in the Back Room" (Frank Loesser, Friedrich Hollander) – 2:16
13. "Darling, Je Vous Aime Beaucoup" (Anna Sosenko) – 2:51
14. "Tenias Que Ser Tu" (Gus Kahn, Arielle Dombasle, Isham Jones) – 2:38
15. "I'm in the Mood for Love" (Dorothy Fields, Jimmy McHugh) – 2:50
