= Arielle Dombasle =

French singer and actress (born 1953)

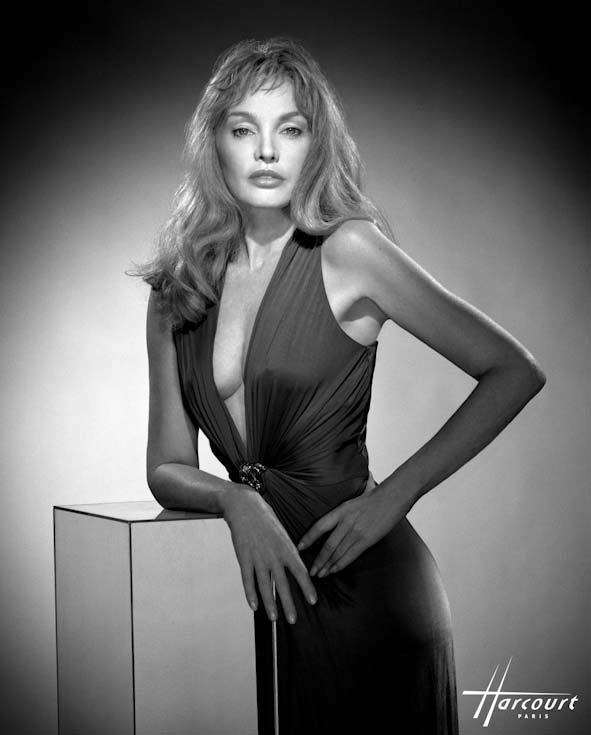
- Dombasle in 2006
- Born: Arielle Laure Maxime Sonnery; April 27, 1953 (age 73); Hartford, Connecticut, U.S.
- Citizenship: United States; France
- Occupations: Actress, singer, director
- Years active: 1978–present
- Spouses: Paul Albou (1976–1985); Bernard-Henri Lévy (m. 1993)
- Website: www.arielle-dombasle.com

Arielle Dombasle (French: [aʁjɛl dɔ̃bal]; born April 27, 1953) (Note: Dombasle's year of birth has been a subject of much debate, and various sources have given dates ranging from 1953 to 1958.) is an American-born French singer, actress, director and model. Her breakthrough roles were in Éric Rohmer's Pauline at the Beach (1983) and Alain Robbe-Grillet's The Blue Villa (1995). She has worked with a wide variety of filmmakers, including Werner Schroeter on Two (2002), Philippe de Broca on Amazon (2000), Roman Polanski on Tess (1979), Jean-Pierre Mocky on Crédit pour tous (2011) and Raoul Ruiz on Savage Souls (2001). She also starred in the 1984 ABC miniseries Lace and its 1985 sequel Lace II and appeared as a guest on Miami Vice ("Definitely Miami" of Season Two). Dombasle has released thirty-four singles and eleven albums and has directed six movies.

== Early life ==
She was born Arielle Laure Maxime Sonnery in Hartford, Connecticut, the daughter of Jean-Louis Melchior Sonnery de Fromental, a silk manufacturer, and Françoise Garreau-Dombasle. She descends from French-American immigrants in Mexico under her grandfather's diplomatic tenure. The family's surname was created in 1912, when Dombasle's grandfather René Sonnery (1887–1925), an industrialist from Lyon, married Anne-Marie Berthon du Fromental. Arielle took the pseudonym Arielle Dombasle in memory of her mother who died at the age of 36. She was raised as a Roman Catholic.

Dombasle and her brother Gilbert were raised in Mexico by their maternal grandparents after their mother's death in 1964. She attended the Lycée Franco-Mexicain. She was also raised at Château de Chaintré, the Sonnery family estate near Mâcon, Saône-et-Loire. Her maternal grandfather, Maurice Garreau-Dombasle, a close friend of and advisor to Charles de Gaulle, was a long time commercial attaché for the French Embassy, who resigned from his post on September 3, 1940, declaring that he would "never work 'under German control'," and on June that year was one of the founders of France Forever, had later served as the French ambassador to Mexico. Her maternal grandmother was Man'ha Garreau-Dombasle (née Germaine Massenet, 1898–1999), a writer and poet who translated Rabindranath Tagore's works into French and was a longtime friend of the science fiction writer Ray Bradbury, who dedicated his 1972 novel The Halloween Tree to her.

== Career ==
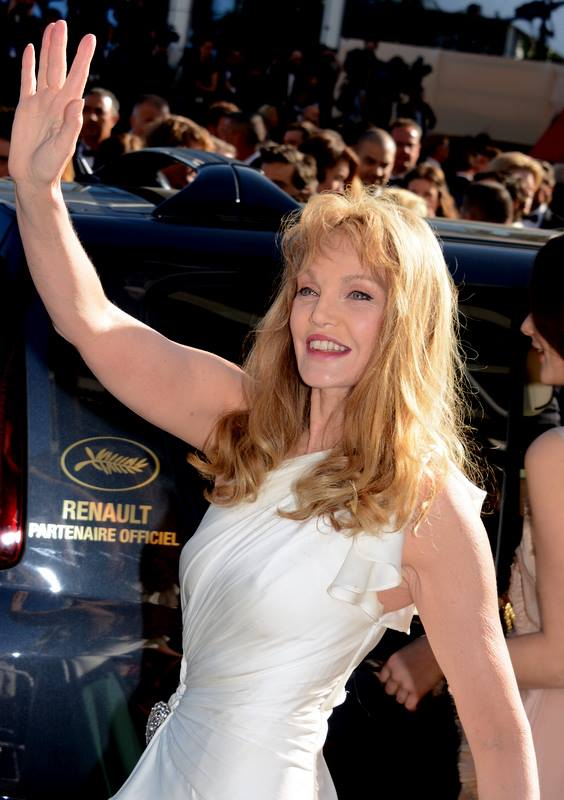
Dombasle at the 2013 Cannes Film Festival

Dombasle embarked on a career as an actress and singer after attending the Conservatoire International de Musique de Paris and further studies in Mexico. Dombasle has appeared in several Hollywood productions, but most of her acting work has been in French, unlike her albums which are mostly in Spanish and English. She directed four films, Les Pyramides Bleues, Chassé-croisé, Opium and Alien Crystal Palace. She once described her own looks as "a Crazy Horse dancing girl".

In 2006, she released both albums Amor Amor and C'est si Bon in the USA. In September 2006, she also performed three nights in a row at the Supper Club in New York City in front of Michael Douglas, John Malkovich, Lauren Bacall, Salman Rushdie, Andrée Putman and Charlie Rose. The latter invited Arielle Dombasle to promote her albums on The Charlie Rose Show.

Arielle Dombasle then released several albums in France; Glamour à Mort!, Diva Latina, Arielle Dombasle by ERA and La Rivière Atlantique with French rocker Nicolas Ker.

Dombasle joined Les Grosses Têtes, a French radio programme, in January 2016.

That same year, Arielle Dombasle released her fragrance, Le Secret d'Arielle, within Mauboussin. The promotional campaign was created by the French artist Leonardo Marcos.

Dombasle is the first contestant who was confirmed for the eighth season of Danse avec les Stars (the French version of Dancing with the Stars).

In 2018, along with Mareva Galanter, Inna Modja and Helena Noguerra, Arielle Dombasle recreated the French band Les Parisiennes.

In 2019, Arielle Dombasle directed and released a movie entitled Alien Crystal Palace with actors such as Nicolas Ker, Michel Fau, Asia Argento, Christian Louboutin, Thaddaeus Ropac.

A year later, in 2020, Arielle Dombasle announced she would be releasing a second joint album with Nicolas Ker, named Empire. The album was supposed to be released on April 24, 2020, but was postponed to June 16, 2020, due to the COVID-19 pandemic.

In 2023, Dombasle directed and released the movie Les Secrets de la princesse de Cadignan based on Honoré de Balzac's Comédie Humaine.

In 2024, Arielle Dombasle released an album entitled Iconics along with a single entitled "Olympics" that she wrote, recorded and produced for the 2024 Paris Olympic Games. Later that year, in December, she released her first Christmas single, a cover of the song "Jingle Bells" she performed in French, English and Spanish.

== Personal life ==
Dombasle is the third wife of writer Bernard-Henri Lévy. They married on June 19, 1993, at Saint-Paul-de-Vence on the Côte d'Azur where they have a villa. She has two stepchildren, Antonin-Balthazar Lévy and Justine Lévy, a novelist. She was married to Dr. Paul Albou, described by Vanity Fair as a "playboy society dentist, 32 years her senior."

In 2009, she signed a petition in support of Roman Polanski, calling for his release after Polanski was arrested in Switzerland in relation to his 1977 charge for drugging and raping a 13-year-old girl, after Steve Cooley, the then Los Angeles District Attorney, tried to prosecute him.

Dombasle is vegetarian. In 2016, she campaigned against abattoirs (slaughterhouses) for PETA.

== Filmography ==
=== Actress ===
Year	Title	Role	Director	Notes
1978	Perceval le Gallois	Blanchefleur	Éric Rohmer	
1978	Mazarin	Marie-Thérèse	Pierre Cardinal	TV Mini-Series
1979	Tess	Mercy Chant	Roman Polanski	
1979	Je te tiens, tu me tiens par la barbichette	Advertising Actress	Jean Yanne	
1979	The French Atlantic Affair	Hotel Operator	Douglas Heyes	TV miniseries
1979	Les dossiers de l'écran	Marie de Bourgogne	Alexandre Astruc	TV series (1 Episode)
1980	Justocoeur	Guest	Mary Stephen	
1980	Catherine de Heilbronn	Kunigunde de Thurneck	Éric Rohmer	TV movie
1981	Fruits of Passion	Nathalie	Shūji Terayama	
1981	Une robe noire pour un tueur	The drug addict	José Giovanni	
1981	Putain d'histoire d'amour	Antonella	Gilles Béhat	
1981	Les panthères	Micheline	Philippe Masson	TV movie
1981	La princesse lointaine	Clarisse	Jean-Pierre Prévost	TV movie
1981	Histoires extraordinaires	Lady Ligeia Fell	Maurice Ronet	TV series (1 Episode)
1982	Le Beau Mariage	Clarisse	Éric Rohmer	
1982	Chassé-croisé	Ermine	Arielle Dombasle	
1982	Laissé inachevé à Tokyo	Sophie	Olivier Assayas	Short
1982	Les dames à la licorne		Lazare Iglesis	TV movie
1982	Mozart	Nancy	Marcel Bluwal	TV miniseries
1983	La Belle captive	The hysterical woman	Alain Robbe-Grillet	
1983	Pauline at the Beach	Marion	Éric Rohmer	
1983	Rosette sort le soir	Katie	Rosette	Short
1983	Un été nommé désir	Arielle	Fred de Fooko	Short
1984	Los motivos de Berta		José Luis Guerín	
1984	Rosette prend sa douche	Sapho	Rosette	Short
1984	Penelope Last	The woman	Fernando Cobo	Short
1984	Lace	Maxine Pascal	William Hale	TV miniseries
1985	La Nuit porte-jarretelles	The secretary	Virginie Thévenet	
1985	Vive la mariée	Charlotte	Jean Valère	TV movie
1985	Lace II	Maxine Pascal	William Hale	TV miniseries
1986	The Boss' Wife	Louise Roalvang	Ziggy Steinberg	
1986	Flagrant désir	Marguerite Barnac	Claude Faraldo	
1986	Sins	Jacqueline Gore	Douglas Hickox	TV miniseries
1986	Miami Vice	Callie Basset	Rob Cohen	TV series (Episode: "Definitely Miami")
1987	Jeux d'artifices	Arielle	Virginie Thévenet	
1988	Les pyramides bleues	Elise	Arielle Dombasle	
1988	Rosette vole les voleurs	The dinner woman	Rosette	Short
1988	Sueurs froides	Juliette Bolbec	Hervé Palud	TV series (1 Episode)
1989	Twisted Obsession	Marion Derain	Fernando Trueba	
1989	Try This One for Size	Maggie	Guy Hamilton	
1989	Incognito	Renata	Alain Bergala	TV movie
1989	The Saint: Wrong Number	Stella Moreau	Marijan David Vajda	TV movie
1989	Around the World in 80 Days	Lucette	Buzz Kulik	TV miniseries
1989	L'or du diable	Emma Calve	Jean-Louis Fournier	TV miniseries
1990	Moi, général de Gaulle	The Countess of Portes	Denys Granier-Deferre	TV movie
1990	L'homme au double visage	Régine Larnin	Claude Guillemot	TV movie
1991	Lola Zipper	Loretta	Ilan Duran Cohen	
1991	Mémoires		Eric Summer	Short
1992	Off Season	Madame Studer	Daniel Schmid	
1992	The Absence		Peter Handke	
1992	La vie crevée	Angele	Guillaume Nicloux	
1992	Villa Mauresque	Sandra	Patrick Mimouni	
1992	Terror Stalks the Class Reunion		Clive Donner	TV movie
1992	La mare aux crocodiles	Florence Cross	Neal Sundstrom	TV movie
1993	L'Arbre, le maire et la médiathèque	Bérénice Beaurivage	Éric Rohmer	
1993	Miroslava	Miroslava	Alejandro Pelayo	
1993	Grand bonheur	The actress	Hervé Le Roux	
1994	Un indien dans la ville	Charlotte	Hervé Palud	
1994	Fado majeur et mineur	Leda	Raúl Ruiz	
1994	Red Shoe Diaries	Celeste	Rafael Eisenman	TV series (1 Episode)
1995	One Hundred and One Nights	The singer	Agnès Varda	
1995	The Blue Villa	Sarah La Blonde	Dimitri de Clercq & Alain Robbe-Grillet	
1995	Mécaniques célestes	Céleste	Fina Torres	
1995	Raging Angels	Megan	Alan Smithee	
1995	À propos de Nice, la suite		Raúl Ruiz	
1995	L'annamite	Jeanne	Thierry Chabert	TV movie
1996	Three Lives and Only One Death	Hélène	Raúl Ruiz	
1996	Les 2 papas et la maman	Delphine	Jean-Marc Longval & Smaïn	
1996	Soyons amis!	Arielle	Thomas Bardinet	Short
1997	Day and Night	Laure	Bernard-Henri Lévy	
1997	Heads or Tails	Rose Petipas	Claude Fournier	
1997	Jeunesse	Clémence	Noël Alpi	
1997	Opération Bugs Bunny	The fairy	Michel Hassan	TV movie
1997	Il deserto di fuoco	Magda	Enzo G. Castellari	TV miniseries
1997	Maigret	Mylène Turner	Pierre Koralnik	TV series (1 Episode)
1998	L'Ennui	Sophie	Cédric Kahn	Nominated - César Award for Best Supporting Actress
1998	Let There Be Light	The Blond God	Arthur Joffé	
1998	Bo Ba Bu	BA	Ali Khamraev	
1998	Hors jeu	Herself	Karim Dridi	
1998	Les amis de Ninon	The client	Rosette	Short
1998	Ivre mort pour la patrie	The bride	Vincent Hachet	Short
1999	Asterix & Obelix Take On Caesar	Madame Agecanonix	Claude Zidi	
1999	Time Regained	Madame de Farcy	Raúl Ruiz	
1999	Les infortunes de la beauté	Daphné	John Lvoff	
1999	C'est pas ma faute!	Vanessa Goudard	Jacques Monnet	
2000	Vatel	Princess of Condé	Roland Joffé	
2000	The Libertine	The Marquise de Jerfeuil	Gabriel Aghion	
2000	Amazone	Margot	Philippe de Broca	
2000	30 ans	Geneviève	Laurent Perrin	
2000	Les faux-fuyants	Luce Ader	Pierre Boutron	TV movie
2001	Savage Souls	Madame Numance	Raúl Ruiz	
2001	Gamer	Valérie Fisher	Patrick Levy	
2001	Les éléphants de la planète Mars	The woman	Philippe Barassat	Short
2002	Two	Professor Barbez	Werner Schroeter	
2002	Hideous Man	Madame KiKi	John Malkovich	Short
2002	Les frangines	Alix	Laurence Katrian	TV movie
2002	La bataille d'Hernani	Mademoiselle Mars / Dona Sol	Jean-Daniel Verhaeghe	TV movie
2003	Lovely Rita, sainte patronne des cas désespérés	Mademoiselle Lecas	Stéphane Clavier	
2003	La belle et la toute petite bête	The Beauty	Max Luna	TV movie
2004	Les parisiens	Sabine Duchemin	Claude Lelouch	
2004	Quand je serai star	Diane de Montalte	Patrick Mimouni	
2004	Albert est méchant	Barbara Lechat	Hervé Palud	
2004	Milady	Milady	Josée Dayan	TV movie
2004	Sissi, l'impératrice rebelle	Sissi	Jean-Daniel Verhaegh	TV movie
2005	Le courage d'aimer	Sabine Duchemin	Claude Lelouch	
2006	Oh La La!	Bettina Fleischer	Anne Fontaine	
2006	Gradiva	Leila / Gradiva	Alain Robbe-Grillet	
2006	L'homme de ta vie	Charlotte	Laurence Katrian	TV movie
2008	Sagan	Astrid	Diane Kurys	
2008	La Possibilité d'une île	Mexican Delegate	Michel Houellebecq	
2008	X Femmes	Inspector Blondie	Arielle Dombasle	TV series (1 Episode)
2009	Au siècle de Maupassant	The Duchess of Carigliano	Jean-Daniel Verhaeghe	TV series (1 Episode)
2009	Myster Mocky présente	Hélène Stone	Jean-Pierre Mocky	TV series (2 Episodes)
2010	Roses à crédit	Madame Denise	Amos Gitai	
2010	El baile de San Juan	Virreina	Francisco Athié	
2010	HH, Hitler à Hollywood	Herself	Frédéric Sojcher	
2010	Ni reprise, ni échangée	Julie	Josée Dayan	TV movie
2011	La mer à l'aube	Charmille	Volker Schlöndorff	
2011	Crédit pour tous	Madame Gobert	Jean-Pierre Mocky	
2011	La rouge et la noire	The daughter	Isabelle Prim	
2012	Une mariée fascinante	The woman	Ali Mahdavi	Short
2012	Scènes de ménages	Sybille	Karim Adda & Francis Duquet	TV series (1 Episode)
2013	Opium	Mnémosyne	Arielle Dombasle	
2013	À votre bon coeur mesdames	Aphrodite	Jean-Pierre Mocky	
2013	The Return		Karl Lagerfeld	Short
2013	Doc Martin	Hortense Le Foll	François Velle	TV series, UK (1 Episode)
2013	Y'a pas d'âge	Cathy	Stéphane Marelli, Vincent Puybaret, ...	TV series (23 Episodes)
2014	Valentin Valentin	Valentin's mother	Pascal Thomas	
2014	DitArielle	Herself	Ali Mahdavi	Short
2014	Magnum	Herself	Philippe Katerine & Gaëtan Chataignier	TV movie
2017	Fais pas ci, fais pas ça	Herself	Michel Leclerc	TV series (1 Episode)
2018	Alien Crystal Palace	Dolores	Arielle Dombasle	
2018	Ma Mère est folle	Jess	Diane Kurys	
2023	Alibi.com 2	Apolline	Philippe Lacheau	TV movie
2023	Les Secrets de la princesse de Cadignan	Diane de Maufrigneuse	Arielle Dombasle	
2024	Le Livreur de Noël	Olga	Cécilia Rouaud	TV movie
2025	The Librarians: The Next Chapter	Dame Anna Mirinoff	Sandra Mitrović	TV series (1 Episode)
2026	The Moment	Maria	Aidan Zamiri	

=== Director ===
Year	Title	Notes
1982	Chassé-Croisé	
1988	Les Pyramides Bleues	
2008	X Femmes : Le Bijou Indiscret	TV series (1 Episode)
2009	La Traversée du Désir	Documentary
2009	Barbie by Arielle Dombasle	
2013	La Voiture d'Albert	
2013	Opium	
2018	Alien Crystal Palace	
2023	Les Secrets de la princesse de Cadignan	

== Theatre ==
Year	Title	Author	Director	Notes
1979	Das Käthchen von Heilbronn	Heinrich von Kleist	Éric Rohmer	Maison de la culture de Nanterre
1979	La Fugue	Francis Lacombrade & Bernard Broca	Jean-Claude Brialy	Théâtre de la Porte Saint-Martin
1985	Retour à Florence	Henry James	Simone Benmussa	Théâtre Renaud-Barrault
1991	L'Absolu naturel	Goffredo Parise	Simone Benmussa	Théâtre Renaud-Barrault
1991	L'as-tu revue ?	Olivier Benezech	Olivier Benezech	Opéra-Comique
1992	Le Jugement dernier	Bernard-Henri Lévy	Jean-Louis Martinelli	Théâtre de l'Atelier
2003	La Belle et la Toute Petite Bête	Jérôme Savary	Jérôme Savary	Opéra-Comique
2008	Don Quichotte contre l'Ange bleu	Jérôme Savary	Jérôme Savary	Théâtre de Paris
2013	El Tigre	Alfredo Arias	Alfredo Arias	Théâtre du Rond-Point
2017	Folle Amanda	Pierre Barillet & Jean-Pierre Gredy	Marie-Pascale Osterrieth	Théâtre de Paris

== Discography ==
=== Singles ===
- "Paris m'a séduit" (1980)
- "Cantate 78" (1985)
- "Je te salue mari" (1986)
- "Nada más" (1988)
- "Amour symphonique" (1989)
- "Liberta" (2000)
- "Odysseus" (2000)
- "Rhum and Coca-Cola" (2004)
- "C'est si bon" (2006)
- "Où tu Veux" (2007)
- "Extraterrestre" (2009)
- "Hasta siempre" (2010)
- "Porque te vas" (2011)
- "Mambo 5" (2011)
- "Ave Maria" (2013)
- "Cold Song" (2013)
- "My Love for Evermore" (2015)
- "I'm Not Here Anymore" (2016)
- "Carthagena" (2016)
- "Point Blank" (2016)
- "Ah c'qu'on est bête" (2018)
- "Il fait trop beau pour travailler" (2018)
- "Le chant des sirènes (We Bleed for the Ocean)" (2020)
- "Just Come Back Alive" (2020)
- "Le Grand Hotél" (2020)
- "Humble Guy" (2020)
- "Twin Kingdom Valley" (2020)
- "The Palace Of Virgin Queen" (2020)
- "Desdemona" (2020)
- "Fever" (2022)
- "Barbiconic" (2022)
- "Boys in the Backroom" (2024)
- "Diamonds are Forever" (2024)
- "Olympics" (2024)
- "Jingle Bells" (2024)

=== Albums ===
- 2000: Liberta
- 2002: Extase
- 2004: Amor Amor
- 2006: C'est Si Bon
- 2009: Glamour à Mort !
- 2011: Diva Latina
- 2013: Arielle Dombasle By Era
- 2015: French Kiss (with The Hillbilly Moon Explosion)
- 2016: La Rivière Atlantique (with Nicolas Ker)
- 2018: Les Parisiennes (with Mareva Galanter, Inna Modja & Helena Noguerra)
- 2020: Empire (with Nicolas Ker)
- 2024: Iconics
