= C'est si bon =

French popular song composed in 1947 by Henri Betti with the lyrics by André Hornez

Song
- Genre: Foxtrot
- Songwriters: Henri Betti (music); André Hornez (French lyrics); Jerry Seelen (English lyrics)

"C'est si bon" (pronounced [sɛ si bɔ̃]; transl. "It's so good") is a French popular song composed in 1947 by Henri Betti with the lyrics by André Hornez. The English lyrics were written in 1949 by Jerry Seelen. The song has been adapted in several languages.

== History ==
In July 1947, Henri Betti was in Nice and on his way to join his father in the center of town to play a game of bridge. Passing under the arcades of the avenue de la Victoire he stopped in front of the window of a Scandale lingerie shop and it was there that the first nine musical notes of the song came into his head: F, E, E♭, F, G, A, G, F, D. He wrote the notes on a sheet of music paper so that he would remember them. Once back home at 52 rue des Ponchettes, he composed the melody in less than ten minutes. He then went up to Paris and made an appointment with the lyricist André Hornez at the Hôtel Grand Powers at 52 rue François Ier to find a title for his song. André Hornez said that the title should be three syllables, sung to the first three notes of the song. The next day the lyricist showed Henri Betti a list of ten three-syllable titles, the last of which was C'est si bon. Henri Betti told him that that was the one he wanted but André Hornez pointed out that there had been a song by Charles Trenet written for the movie Frederica named "C'est bon" a few years previously. Henri Betti told him that si made all the difference. The song was registered at the SACEM on 18 August 1947.

On the advice of Roger Seiller at SACEM's publisher, Paul Beuscher, he proposed the song to Yves Montand at the same time as "Mais qu'est-ce que j'ai ?" which he had composed with lyrics from Édith Piaf and deposited at SACEM the same day. On 9 October 1947, at the Théâtre de l'Étoile, Yves Montand sang "Mais qu'est-ce que j'ai ?" but didn't sing "C'est si bon" because he thought that it was not in his style. While waiting for the song editor to offer him another performer, Henri Betti sang it himself at the restaurant La Réserve in Nice in the evening with opening and closing music. In January 1948, the publisher Paul Beuscher told Henri Betti that he would first try out the song with Jacques Hélian and his Orchestra for the radio. The disc was recorded the following month and sung by Jean Marco.

In February 1948 the publisher offered the song to Suzy Delair to sing during the first Nice Jazz Festival. She sang the song on February 28 at the Hotel Negresco in a jam session called La Nuit de Nice at which Louis Armstrong was present; he loved the song. On June 26, 1950, Armstrong recorded the American version of the song with Sy Oliver and his Orchestra in New York City. When the disc was released, it was a worldwide success and the song was subsequently taken up by many great international singers.

== Recordings ==
On 18 January 1948, Jean Marco performed the song with Jacques Hélian and his Orchestra for the radio station Programme Parisien of the French Broadcasting.

On 26 February 1948, Lucien Jeunesse recorded the song with Émile Prud'homme and his Orchestra.

On 5 May 1948, the Étienne Sisters recorded the song with Raymond Legrand and his Orchestra and this version became a hit. In 1968, they recorded it again with Raymond Legrand and his Orchestra.

On 7 May 1948, Yves Montand recorded the song with Bob Castella and his Orchestra. In 1964, he recorded the song again but with Hubert Rostaing and his Orchestra for his album Le Paris de...

The same year, Bernard Hilda recorded the song with his orchestra. On the other side of the disk, he records another song composed by Henri Betti the same year: "Mais qu'est-ce que j'ai ?" (lyrics by Édith Piaf).

On 30 March 1950, Jean Sablon recorded the French version of the song in London with Woolf Phillips and his Orchestra. On 23 November of the same year, he recorded the English version in Buenos Aires with Emil Stern and his Orchestra.

From 18 March to 9 December 1950, Sylvie St. Clair sang the English version of the song with Debroy Somers and his Orchestra in the revue Latin Quarter 1950 created by Robert Nesbitt and presented at the London Casino.

In 1951, Dolores Gray sang the song in English in the short film Holiday in Paris: Paris.

In 1953, Eartha Kitt recorded the song in French with Henri René and his Orchestra for her album That Bad Eartha. A year later, she sang the song in New Faces.

In 1953, Stan Freberg sang a comic version of the song.

In 1954, Eddie Constantine recorded the song in French with Herman Garst and his Orchestra.

In 1957, Nat King Cole sang the song in English with Nelson Riddle and his Orchestra in The Nat King Cole Show.

In 1958, Caterina Valente recorded the song in English with Kurt Edelhagen and his Orchestra for her album A Toast to the Girls.

In 1960, Conway Twitty recorded the song in English, adding "It's So Good" to the title. It was a non-album single release.

In 1961, Bing Crosby recorded the song in English with musical arrangements by Bob Thompson and conducted by Malcolm Lockyer for his album Holiday in Europe, a collection of European hits.

In 1962, Dean Martin recorded the song in English with the musical arrangements of Neal Hefti for his album French Style where he sings several popular French songs.

Also in 1962, Ann-Margret recorded a version on her album The Vivacious One

In 1964, Jane Morgan covered the song on her album The Last Time I Saw Paris with both French and English lyrics.

Also in 1964, Allan Sherman recorded a parody, "I See Bones" for his album My Son, the Nut, with a doctor describing to his patient an X-ray showing various improbable items in his innards.

In 1966, Barbra Streisand recorded the song in English with the musical arrangements of Michel Legrand (son of Raymond Legrand) for her album Color Me Barbra which is promoted in a color TV show on CBS on 30 March 1966.

In 1978 Yukihiro Takahashi recorded a bilingual version of the song in Japanese and French for his album Saravah!

In 1978, Madleen Kane and Rhoda Scott recorded a bilingual disco version of the song.

In 1979, Dream Express recorded a disco version of the song in English.

In 1992, Take 6 recorded a bilingual a cappella version of the song for an advertisement on a toilet water by Yves Saint Laurent.

In 1993, Abbey Lincoln recorded the song in French accompanied by Hank Jones on piano for her album When There Is Love.

In 2003, Lisa Ono recorded a Bossa nova version of the song in French with the musical arrangements of Mario Adnet for her album Dans mon île where she sings several popular French songs.

In 2006, Arielle Dombasle recorded the song in a bilingual version with the musical arrangements of Jean-Pascal Beintus for her album C'est si bon.

In 2007, Emilie-Claire Barlow recorded the song in French for her album The Very Thought of You. She recorded the song again in 2012 for her album Seule ce soir, which won the Juno Award for Vocal Jazz Album of the Year.

In 2016, Tatiana Eva-Marie recorded the song in French with the Avalon Jazz Band on their album "Je suis Swing", a tribute to the Zazous.

In 2017, Mireille Mathieu recorded the song (in French) for her double CD album Made in France, which gathers the greatest French songs known around the world, interpreted by the singer. It was announced in her official website on 15 August that year.

In 2020, Thomas Dutronc recorded the song in trio with Iggy Pop and Diana Krall for his album Frenchy where he covers several popular French songs.

In 2022, Nikki Yanofsky recorded the song in French and released it as a single and is on her album Nikki by Starlight.

== Adaptations ==
In 1949, Giacomo Mario Gili and Nino Rastelli wrote the Italian lyrics of the song for the recording of Natalino Otto with Luciano Zuccheri and his Orchestra in March 1949. The title of the song became "Tutto è bello".

The same year, Jerry Seelen wrote the English lyrics for the recording of Johnny Desmond with Tony Mottola and his Orchestra in January 1950. The title of the song is not translated. In 1963, Allan Sherman wrote other English lyrics for his version, which he named "I See Bones".

In 1950, Ralph Maria Siegel wrote the German lyrics for the recording of Rita Gallos with Kurt Edelhagen and his Orchestra in May 1950. In 1983, Adrian Wolf wrote other German lyrics with the pseudonym Thore Holgerson for Maren Kroymann's version. The title of the song is not translated into German.

The same year, Tapio Kullervo Lahtinen wrote the Finnish lyrics for the recording of Maire Ojonen with George de Godzinsky and his Orchestra. The title of the song became "Hyvä on olla luonasi".

The same year, Gösta Rybrant wrote the Swedish lyrics for the recording of Gustaf Torrestad with Thore Jederby and his Orchestra. The title of the song is not translated. In 1980, Gösta Wälivaara wrote other Swedish lyrics for the recording of Janne Carlsson and the title of his version became "Långkalsong". In 1995, Claes Eriksson wrote other Swedish lyrics for the recording of Galenskaparna och After Shave with Den ofattbara and his Orchestra and the title of his version became "Direktör".

In 1951, Augusto Alguero wrote the Spanish lyrics for the recording of Ana María González. The title of the song became "Es mejor".

In 1952, Henryk Rostworowski wrote the Polish lyrics for the recording of Marta Mirska with Wiesław Machan and his Orchestra. In 2000, Wojciech Młynarski wrote other Polish lyrics for the recording of Irena Santor. The title of the song is not translated into Polish.

In 1958, Otto Leisner wrote the Danish lyrics for the recording of Lørdagspigerne. The title of the song is not translated into Danish.

Vécsey Ernő wrote the Hungarian lyrics for the recording of Záray Márta. The title of the song became "Vártam rád".

Tokiko Iwatani wrote the Japanese lyrics for the recording of Fubuki Koshiji. In 1978, Jun'ichi Nakahara wrote other Japanese lyrics for the recording of Yukihiro Takahashi. The title of the song is not translated into Japanese.

In 1974, Klaane Jan wrote the Dutch lyrics for his version with Roland Thyssen and his Orchestra. The title of the song became "T'ess zu goot".

In 1984, Alla Bayanova wrote the Romanian lyrics for his version. The title of the song became "Ce frumos".

In 1988, Rita Lee wrote the Portuguese lyrics for her version which she named "Cecy Bom". In 2016, Izabella Rocha wrote other Portuguese lyrics for her version which she named "É Tão Bom".

== Filmography ==
- 1948: Rythmes de Paris by Henri Verneuil. Performed by Jean Marco.
- 1951: Holiday in Paris: Paris by John Nasht. Performed by Dolores Gray.
- 1953: Trois hommes et un piano by André Berthomieu. Performed by Henri Betti.
- 1953: Soyez les bienvenus by Pierre-Louis. Instrumental version.
- 1953: His Father's Portrait (Le portrait de son père) by André Berthomieu. Instrumental version.
- 1953: It Happened in the Park (Villa Borghese) by Gianni Franciolini. Instrumental version.
- 1953: We, the Women (Siamo donne) by Alfredo Guarini. Instrumental version.
- 1954: New Faces by Harry Horner. Performed by Eartha Kitt.
- 1955: Rommel's Treasure by Romolo Marcellini. Instrumental version.
- 1955: Sam and Friends (episode "C'est si bon") by Jim Henson. Performed by Stan Freberg.
- 1957: Rendez-vous avec Maurice Chevalier n°2 by Maurice Régamey. Hummed by Maurice Chevalier.
- 1957: Poyot Ives Montand by Mikhail Slutsky and Sergei Yutkevich. Performed by Yves Montand.
- 1957: Satchmo the Great by Edward R. Murrow. Performed by Louis Armstrong.
- 1957: Love in the Afternoon by Billy Wilder. Instrumental version.
- 1957: Rascel-Fifi by Guido Leoni. Hummed by Renato Rascel.
- 1957: Lazzarella by Carlo Ludovico Bragaglia. Instrumental version.
- 1958: Zycie jest Piekne by Tadeusz Makarczynski. Performed by Louis Armstrong.
- 1959: State Trooper (episode "The Girl on Cloud Nine") by Richard Irving. Performed by Gale Robbins.
- 1959: Wild Cats on the Beach (Costa Azzurra) by Vittorio Sala. Hummed by Alberto Sordi.
- 1961: Ghosts of Rome (Fantasmi a Roma) by Antonio Pietrangeli. Hummed by an extra.
- 1961: Leave It to Beaver (episode Wally’s Big Date) by David Butler. Instrumental version.
- 1962: Two Tickets to Paris by Greg Garrison. Performed by Joey Dee and the Starliters.
- 1963: Le magot de Josefa by Claude Autant-Lara. Instrumental version.
- 1963: La voix dans le verre by Lazare Iglesis. Instrumental version.
- 1964: The Fugitive (episode "World's End") by Robert Butler. Instrumental version.
- 1964: Burke's Law (episode Who Killed Snooky Martinelli ?) by Robert Ellis Miller. Performed by Gene Barry.
- 1965: The Munsters (episode "Lily Munster, Girl Model") by Earl Bellamy. Instrumental version.
- 1965: Bewitched (episode "A Change of Face") by William Asher. Instrumental version.
- 1965: Run for Your Life (episode The Girl Next Door Is A Spy) by Leslie H. Martinson. Performed by Irma Curry.
- 1966: Color Me Barbra by Dwight Hemion and Roland Vance. Performed by Barbra Streisand.
- 1967 : That Girl (episode Paper Hats & Everything) by John Erman. Instrumental version.
- 1967: Gomer Pyle, U.S.M.C. (episode "Lou-Ann Poovie Sings Again") by Coby Ruskin. Performed by Elizabeth MacRae.
- 1972: Monty Python's Flying Circus (episode "The Cycling Tour") by Ian MacNaughton. Instrumental version.
- 1973: Der Wind hat mir ein Lied erzählt by Dieter Wendrich. Performed by Gitta Lind.
- 1974: Earthquake by Mark Robson. Instrumental version.
- 1975: Columbo (episode "Troubled Waters") by Ben Gazzara. Instrumental version.
- 1976: A Butterfly in the Night (Una mariposa en la noche) by Armando Bó. Performed by Yves Montand.
- 1977: Silvestr 1977 by Ján Rohác. Performed by Milan Lasica, Július Satinský and Jana Kocianová.
- 1978: Fedora by Billy Wilder. Hummed by Marthe Keller.
- 1979: Shirley MacLaine at the Lido by Dwight Hemion. Performed by Shirley MacLaine and Tom Jones.
- 1981: Perry Como's French-Canadian Christmas by Jeff Margolis. Performed by Perry Como and Diane Tell.
- 1982: Mit Musik Geht Alles Besser by Ekkehard Böhmer. Performed by Jean-Claude Pascal.
- 1982: All By Myself : The Eartha Kitt Story by Christian Blackwood. Performed by : Eartha Kitt.
- 1985: Magnum, P.I. (episode "The Man from Marseilles") by John Llewellyn Moxey. Instrumental version.
- 1987: Through Main Street with an Orchestra (Po glavnoy ulitse s orkestrom) by Pyotr Todorovsky. Hummed by Oleg Menshikov.
- 1989: Lili, a Estrela do Crime by Lui Farias. Performed by Rita Lee.
- 1989: American Masters (episode "Satchmo") by Gary Giddins and Kendrick Simmons. Performed by Louis Armstrong.
- 1994: Ladri di cinema by Piero Natoli. Performed by Yves Montand.
- 1995: Faust (episode "Tödliche Route") by Michael Mackenroth. Performed by Eartha Kitt.
- 1995: Lyckad nedfrysning av herr Moro by Claes Eriksson. Performed by Peter Rangmar.
- 1996: Chloé by Dennis Berry. Performed by Louis Armstrong.
- 1996: The Nanny (episode "A Pup in Paris") by Dorothy Lyman. Performed by Eartha Kitt.
- 1996: Mad Dog Time by Larry Bishop. Performed by Dean Martin.
- 1996: Transatlantique by Christine Laurent. Performed by Évelyne Didi.
- 1997: Monsieur Montand by Claude Druhot and Gilbert Kahn. Performed by Yves Montand.
- 1998 : Hilda Furacão (episodes 26, 27, 28 et 29). Performed by Eartha Kitt.
- 1998: Beautiful Sunday by Tetsuya Nakashima. Performed by Mamako Yoneyama.
- 1999: Balko (episode "Verkaufte Unschuld") by Andy Bausch. Performed by Eartha Kitt.
- 2001: Dean Martin: That's Amore by David Leaf and John Scheinfeld. Performed by Dean Martin.
- 2002: Laurel Canyon by Lisa Cholodenko. Performed by Eartha Kitt.
- 2003: Something's Gotta Give by Nancy Meyers. Performed by Eartha Kitt.
- 2003: Cuéntame cómo pasó (episode "Arde París") by Agustín Crespi. Performed by Yves Montand.
- 2003: Cuéntame cómo pasó (episode "La larga noche del maletín") by Agustín Crespi. Performed by Louis Armstrong.
- 2006: En uppstoppad hund by Kristina Humle. Performed by Stig Gabrielson.
- 2007: The Ballroom (Chega de Saudade) by Laís Bodanzky. Performed by Norma Bengell.
- 2007: Game of Four (Détrompez-vous) by Bruno Dega. Performed by Dean Martin.
- 2009: Rita Rocks (episode "What's Love Got to Do with It") by Lynn M. McCracken. Performed by Tisha Campbell-Martin.
- 2009: Caras & Bocas (episode 1, season 1) by Ary Coslov. Performed by Rita Lee.
- 2011: Herr Alsmann trifft Frau Hielscher by Klaus Michael Heinz. Performed by Margot Hielscher.
- 2011: Ivo Livi, dit Yves Montand by Patrick Rotman. Performed by Yves Montand.
- 2011: Empreintes (episode "Brasseur, père et fils") by Anne Andreu. Performed by Yves Montand.
- 2011 : Donna Leon (episode Das Mädchen seiner Träume) by Sigi Rothemund. Performed by Louis Armstrong.
- 2011: The Great Ghost Rescue by Yann Samuell. Performed by Graffiti6.
- 2013: The Wolf of Wall Street by Martin Scorsese. Performed by Eartha Kitt.
- 2014: Mulheres de abril (episode "Uma família transmontana") by Henrique Oliveira. Performed by Eartha Kitt.
- 2014: Miss Sixty by Sigrid Hoerner. Performed by Iris Berben and Alexander Hacke.
- 2014: X-Men: Days of Future Past by Bryan Singer. Performed by Eartha Kitt.
- 2014: Altman by Ron Mann. Performed by Yves Montand.
- 2015: Mad Men (episode "New Business") by Michael Uppendahl. Performed by Yves Montand.
- 2016: End of a Gun by Keoni Waxman. Hummed by Ovidiu Niculescu.
- 2016: Absolutely Fabulous: The Movie by Mandie Fletcher. Performed by Eartha Kitt.
- 2017: Father Brown (episode The Crimson Feather) by Paul Gibson. Performed by Alex Sawyer.
- 2017: Molly's Game by Aaron Sorkin. Performed by Eartha Kitt.
- 2018: Show Dogs by Raja Gosnell. Hummed by Stanley Tucci.
- 2018: The Man in the High Castle (episode "Kasumi") by Jennifer Getzinger. Performed by Marlie Collins.
- 2019: Huge in France (episode 5) by Andrew Mogel and Jarrad Paul. Performed by Guy Marchand.
- 2019: The Appolo by Roger Ross Williams. Performed by Eartha Kitt.
- 2020: Emily in Paris (episode "An American Auction in Paris") by Peter Lauer. Performed by Eartha Kitt.
- 2020: The Crown (episode "The Hereditary Principle") by Jessica Hobbs. Performed by Dean Martin.
- 2020 : Peter Sellers : a State of Comic Ecstasy by John O’Rourke. Performed by Eartha Kitt.
- 2021: Montand est à nous by Yves Jeuland. Performed by Yves Montand.
- 2022: Maigret by Patrice Leconte. Performed by Mélanie Bernier and Pierre Moure.
- 2022: Blockbuster (episode "King of Queens") by Vanessa Ramos. Performed by Eartha Kitt.
- 2024: O Familie Aproape Perfecta by Tudor Platon. Performed by Louis Armstrong.
- 2025: Moi qui t'aimais by Diane Kurys. Performed by Yves Montand.
- 2025: Palm Royale (episode Maxine Drinks Martinis Now) by Abe Sylvia. Performed by Ann-Margret.
- 2026: Sugar (episode "Downer Town") by Michael Morris. Performed by Dean Martin.

== Advertisements ==
- 1972: Grapillon uses the song for their red grape juice.
- 1980 and 1982: Mont Blanc uses the song for their dessert cream.
- 1983, 1985 and 1987: Simmons uses the song for their mattresses.
- 1990 and 1992: Yves Saint Laurent uses the version of Jill Jones for their toilet water Jazz and the version of Take 6 for their toilet water Jazz Prestige.
- 1993: Hautes-Pyrénées uses the song for their ski resort.
- 1994: Cidou uses the song for their juice Cidorange.
- 1999 and 2000: William Saurin uses the song for their ready-cooked dish.
- 2005 and 2006: LU uses the song for their cake Vandame.
- 2007: Jacques Vabre uses the song for their coffee Costa Rica and Pérou.
- 2012: Pierre Fabre uses the song for their drug Cetavlon.
- 2012: McDonald's uses the version of Bob Sinclar for their sandwich McBaguette.
- 2013, 2020 and 2023: Géramont uses the song for their cheese C'est bon.
- 2013: Harrys uses the version of Louis Armstrong for their pain de mie Beau et Bon.
- 2013: Palmolive uses the song for their shower gel Gourmet.
- 2014: Grey Goose uses the version of Eartha Kitt for their bottle of vodka The Gift.
- 2014: Renault uses the version of Maximilien Philippe for their car Renault Clio.
- 2015: Beats Electronics uses the version of Eartha Kitt for their headphones Solo2 Wireless.
- 2016 and 2017: Crédit Agricole uses the song for their bank Credit Agricole Bank Polska.
- 2018: Sabon uses the version of Dean Martin for their soap La Sabongerie.
- 2018: Jumbo uses the version of Eartha Kitt for their Mexican green salad and watermelon.
- 2021: Fédération nationale des chasseurs uses the song for their advertising campaign.
- 2021: Cisowianka uses the version of Eartha Kitt for their bottled water Perlage.
- 2022: Aldar Properties uses the version of Emilie-Claire Barlow for their residences Louvre Abu Dhabi.
