= Leonardo Marcos =

French multidisciplinary artist

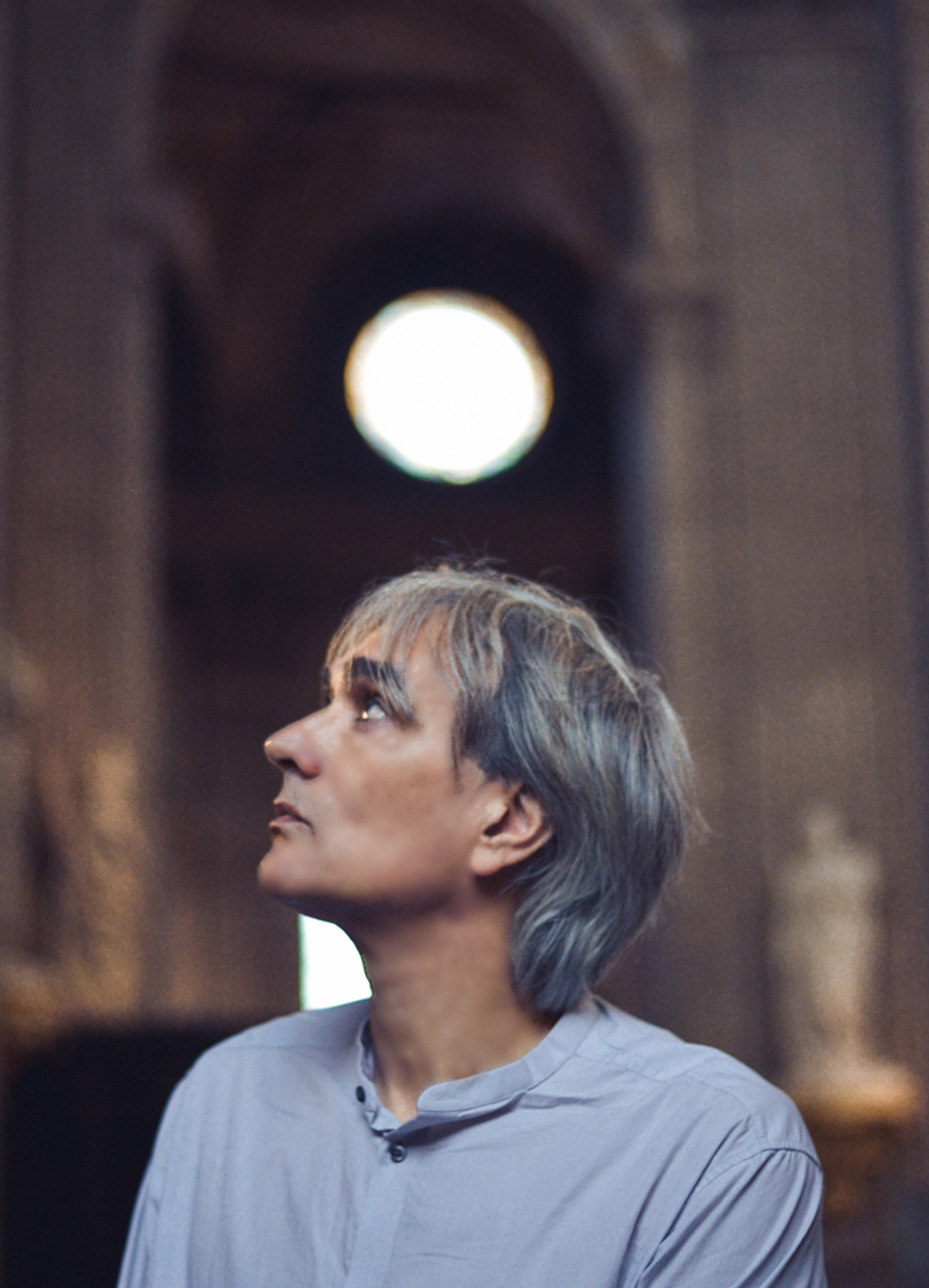
- Born: Paris, France
- Education: École du Louvre
- Website: leonardomarcos.fr

Leonardo Marcos is a French multidisciplinary artist. Born in Paris, the son of Spanish political refugees, he was educated in music and movie-making. He works in diverse disciplines: as an author, photographer, movie director, stage director and composer.

== Biography ==
=== Early life ===
The son of Spanish parents who fled to Argentina, he was born in Paris. His parents were taken in for a while by Agnès Varda who photographed regularly this family of political immigrants. She made the film documentary Ulysse, name of Leonardo's cousin whom she photographed as a child; the film was awarded a César.

=== Artistic and professional background ===
Marcos’ father, a self-taught music lover, was able to leave the construction business where he was a worker to become a piano maker. Music will play an important role in the art work of his son Leonardo. He learned to play classical piano but he was also interested in Rock music and decided to get a band together with the start of the punk movement and the new wave.

Serge Gainsbourg, who gave him his friendly support, introduced him to record companies and he was signed up by Philippe Constantin with Barclay. The song " Illusions perdues " by his band Jours étranges, was released in 1986. His concerts present creations with a multidisciplinary dimension including video and staging of living tableaux. After entering the École du Louvre, he chooses to specialize as a post-grad in movie history under the direction of Gilles Deleuze. He met Freddy Hausser, producer who made video clips and TV shows and a friend of the Rolling Stones. He teaches him television journalism and live shows on channel La Cinq with Guillaume Durand. During the Rumanian revolution, the new concept of live news broadcasting makes him choose a career as a journalist producer. He made many news coverages and TV shows mainly on fashion on an international level, via the press agency WTN and for BRUT, a magazine on Arte. His interest in new audiovisual formats leads him to produce films and events for brands. He is in charge of programming artistic events in Le O, a venue upstairs of Rendez-Vous Toyota.

=== Artistic career ===
As of 2005, Marcos multiplies artistic events that helped to promote his poems in particular modes of dissemination: gigantic projections in the street at the Centre d’études catalanes of the Sorbonne Nouvelle, at the galerie RX and at the Maison de la Catalogne for the White Night.

He designed with one of his poems a new Mona Lisa in digital art form through an initiatory route at the Louvre Museum. In his event shows at the galerie Amicorum St Honoré et Papillon, he created animations and performances around his works. At the musée national de la Marine, he presented in the form of visual projections, dithyrambs, written in the original classical style. Many performances were made during those exhibitions as well as in the musical scenic context of La Générale des arts and at the Media village. The staging of those performances expresses the obsessions and deviances of the artist which are the main source of inspiration of his art. One of the major themes is the multiplicity of feminine characters.

His encounter with Catherine Robbe-Grillet led to a book published in 2011, Images publiques, images privées, including interviews and photographs. This book was followed by an exhibition at the galerie du Passage – Pierre Passebon.

In 2013, Marcos published for Les éditions de la Différence, Les Filles du cahier volé, a book written together with Régine Deforges and Manon Abauzit. The book reported on the difficult adolescence and the discrimination suffered by Régine Deforges. It included photographs shown mainly at the galerie du Passage with a text by Sonia Rykiel. Several artistic events surrounded the launch of the book, including performances in a 12th-century church in Montmorillon. The following year, in 2014, the artist also exhibited his Polaroid photographs in the Japanese galerie Toko in Paris.

In 2016, he explored new forms of art around the concept of " Digital Poetry " by making a digital work of art with one of his poems that was initially presented at the Palais de Tokyo. The Crédit Agricole CIB asked him to make a permanent digital installation in their headquarters. He designed to that effect a digital poem made of projections, pictures and sound recordings. The permanent diffusion of a series of creations of an animated poem was a first in the field of digital art and poetry. and at the Hôtel Particulier Montmartre. His creations were selected by Arielle Dombasle and Mauboussin for the launch and the communication campaign of her perfume "Le secret d'Arielle", accompanied by an art show

In his book, La Galerie des Beautés, Leonardo Marcos pays a tribute to feminine beauty through a series of portraits, including H.R.H. Princess Caroline of Hanovre or Setsuko Klossowska de Rola, the widow of the painter Balthus. During the show for the launch of the book, Leonardo Marcos also did projections of his poems and " poetic " chats, via the Internet, between the visitors and three of his models. Marcos has continued working for different brands as the film-maker for Hermès for all the films for the Fondation d’entreprise Hermès.

== Concepts ==
=== Digital Poetry ===
Digital poetry presents texts in the form of video projections. It consists in a visual poetry where the words are graphically animated.

=== Electro-Poetry ===
On the dance-floor of clubbing evenings, texts are read by young models chosen by Leonardo Marcos with an electro music background.

=== Interactive Poetry ===
Models or muses chat live on computer screens with visitors during artistic events. They write, depending on the type of content, excerpts from the artist's poems.

=== Artistic approach ===
His approach deals in giving a new life to poetry by taking it out of its classical book context. He calls it the "New Poetry".

The art of Leonardo Marcos is figurative, mannerist and traditional in response to current contemporary. His works remain avant-garde, particularly thanks to the use of new technological processes that he puts at the service of his creative inventions, his style and its form.

== Events ==
Marcos has taken part in many events, often in the setting of the White Night and the Printemps des poètes, for the Musée National de la Marine, the Centre d’Étude Catalane of the Sorbonne Nouvelle, the Collège des Bernardins, the maison de la Catalogne, the church of Saint-Merri, the Musée de la Vie romantique and also the Générale des arts. He regularly shows his creations at the Galerie du Passage of Pierre Passebon when he launches a book.

=== 2026 ===
- " Ideas From the New Poetry ": Since June 2026, Marcos has been co-hosting an online poetry series alongside Jon Bernys, an American musician and poet, dedicated to the future and relevance of poetry.

=== 2017 ===
- " Sensualism – Mysticism ": artistic and musical staging with Jaz Coleman, Arielle Dombasle and Romain Turzi at the church of Saint-Merri. In a partnership with the prix littéraire des grandes écoles
- " La galerie des beautés ": Exhibition of photographs, digital and interactive poetry, live art at the Galerie du Passage, Paris
- " Art Blossom – Le Bal des Fleurs ": artistic and musical staging at the Musée de la Vie Romantique, Paris. In a partnership with the prix littéraire des grandes écoles

=== 2016 ===
- " Sensualism ! A digital experience poetry with Leonardo Marcos and Jaz Coleman ": digital poetry, live art, poetry reading at the Hôtel Particulier in the context of the Mois Particulier, Paris
- " Lumière du temps ": digital poem in the form of in situ and permanent digital installations and visual creations at the headquarters of the Crédit Agricole CIB, Montrouge
- " Lumière du temps ": digital poem in the form of visual creations and digital installations at the Palais de Tokyo, Paris
- " By Leonardo ": monthly art program at the Tigre, Paris
- " Le secret d’Arielle ": Exhibition, visual creations, installations and live art at the Galerie du Passage, Paris
- " Le secret d’Arielle ": advertising campaign with photographs and films for Mauboussin

=== 2014 ===
- " De l’autre côté du miroir – Alice et Les belles endormies " : Exhibition, performances, piano concerts (Mihoko Oshima and Yuki Kondo) at the Galerie Toko – showroom, Paris
- " Filles de feu ": Exhibition at the ISBA gallery, Perpignan
- " Lignes et réalités ": video installations for the evening of the Fondation d’entreprise Hermès at the CND, Pantin

=== 2013 ===
- " Racontez-moi cela ! " : Exhibition, performances at the Galerie du Passage – Pierre Passebon, Paris
- " Les Filles du cahier volé ": Exposition at the Galerie Émilie Dujat, Bruxelles
- " Les Filles du cahier volé ": Encounter, poetic and musical performances at the théâtre POÈME 2, Bruxelles
- " Les Filles du cahier volé ": Readings, performancesduring the literary event La forêt des livres, Loches
- " Les Filles du cahier volé ": Exhibition, performances at the Chapelle des Grandmontains, Book Fair of Montmorillon, Montmorrillon
- " Les Filles du cahier volé ": Exhibition, poetic and musical performances, Espace des femmes, Paris
- " Les Filles du cahier volé ": Exhibition, performance at the Galeries Lafayette, Paris

=== 2011 ===
- " Images publiques, images privées ": Exhibition, signing of the book (by the authors: Catherine Robbe-Grillet and Leonardo Marcos), video art: Tribute to Alain Robbe-Grillet with Arielle Dombasle and Farida Khelfa at the Galerie du Passage of Pierre Passebon, Paris

=== 2010 ===
- Exhibition at the Verdeau Passage, Paris with poetry recitals: " Antichambre # 3 "

=== 2009 ===
- Artistic interpretation of poems by St Jean de la Croix at The Collège des Bernardins.

=== 2008 ===
- Media Village:" The Temple of Words ". Poetry recitals with projections of images and words.

=== 2007 ===
- " The Spring of Poets " – Centre of Catalan Studies, Sorbonne University, Paris: " Timeless Dialogues " Poetry readings of Maria Ibars with outdoor image projections
- La Générale des Arts: " A death elsewhere ". Poetry recitals to contemporary music.
- “Nuit Blanche” – Catalonia Centre. Ministry of culture of Barcelona, Paris:" Surrealistic! "

Poetry recitals with projections of images and words.

=== 2006 ===
- RX gallery, Paris: " The impossible letter ". Readings and outdoor image projections

=== 2005 ===
- The Louvre Museum, Paris: " Numerical Mona Lisa ". Introductory parcours of a revisited version of the painting. With screen installations (LG partnership).
- Nuit Blanche – RX gallery, Paris: " Stronger than death ". Readings and performances with video installations and image projections.
- Amicorum St Honoré gallery, Paris: " Antichambre #2 ". Readings and photographic exhibition.

=== 2004 ===
- Amicorum St Honoré gallery, Paris: Exhibition " Antichambre # 1 ". Poetic recitals, video installations and image projections.
- Rendez-Vous Toyota showroom, Paris: " Fabricate the future ". Readings, video installations and image projections.

=== 2003 ===
- Nuit Blanche: National Marine Museum, Paris: " Geniuses of the sea in images ". Video installations and image projections.
- Rendez-Vous Toyota showroom, Paris: Creation of " Le O " space. Multidisciplinary artistic events: cinemix, video, photos, music.

=== 2002 ===
- Pravda exhibition with Guy Peellaert: Nouveau Casino, Paris

== Book Publication ==
=== 2011 ===
∗Les Filles du cahier volé : Régine Deforges, Manon Abauzit, Sonia Rykiel and Leonardo Marcos, Éditions de La Différence, 2013, Paris ∗Images Publiques – Images Privées : Catherine Robbe-Grillet and Leonardo Marcos, édition Epitheme, 2011, Paris ∗La Galerie des beautés, Éditions de la Différence, 2017, Paris
