= Carnival in Flanders =

Carnival in Flanders may refer to:

- Carnival in Flanders (film)
- Carnival in Flanders (musical)
