= Holiday in Paris: Paris =

- Directed by: John Nasht
- Starring: Dolores Gray; Édith Piaf; The Four Step Brothers; Raymond Girerd
- Release date: 1951
- Running time: 26 minutes
- Countries: France; United States
- Languages: French; English

Holiday in Paris: Paris is a French short film directed by John Nasht in 1951.

== Synopsis ==
Dolores Gray arrives in Paris to discover dance and singing numbers.

== Songs ==
- "Retour à Paris"
  - Music by Charles Trenet
  - Lyrics by Charles Trenet
  - Performed by Raymond Girerd
- "C'est si bon"
  - Music by Henri Betti
  - French lyrics by André Hornez
  - English lyrics by Jerry Seelen
  - Performed by Dolores Gray
- "Hymne à l'amour"
  - Music by Marguerite Monnot
  - Lyrics by Édith Piaf
  - English lyrics by Geoffrey Parsons
  - Performed by Édith Piaf

== Anecdote ==
This is the first film where the songs "C'est si bon" and "Hymne à l'amour" are sung with the English lyrics.
