= Amazon (2000 film) =

- Film poster
- Directed by: Philippe de Broca
- Written by: Philippe de Broca
- Produced by: Christine Gozlan; Alain Sarde
- Starring: Jean-Paul Belmondo; Arielle Dombasle; Patrick Bouchitey; Thylda Barès; André Penvern
- Cinematography: Jean-François Robin
- Edited by: Henri Lanoë
- Music by: Alexandre Desplat
- Production companies: Les Films Alain Sarde; TF1 Films Production; PHF Films S.L.
- Distributed by: BAC Films
- Release date: 19 July 2000
- Running time: 88 minutes
- Country: France
- Language: French

Amazon is a 2000 French film directed by Philippe de Broca and starring Jean Paul Belmondo.

It had admissions of 78,706.
