= Disinformation =

Deliberately misleading information

Disinformation is false or misleading information deliberately spread to deceive people, or to secure economic or political gain and which may cause public harm. Disinformation is an orchestrated adversarial activity in which actors employ strategic deceptions and media manipulation tactics to advance political, military, or commercial goals. Disinformation is implemented through coordinated campaigns that "weaponize multiple rhetorical strategies and forms of knowing—including not only falsehoods but also truths, half-truths, and value judgements—to exploit and amplify culture wars and other identity-driven controversies."

In contrast, misinformation refers to inaccuracies that stem from inadvertent error. Misinformation can be used to create disinformation when known misinformation is purposefully and intentionally disseminated. "Fake news" has sometimes been categorized as a type of disinformation, although scholars distinguish between the two concepts. Some researchers have cautioned against using the term in academic writing because of its lack of precision and its contested use in public and political discourse regarding news coverage or information. Others note that it continues to be used both in reference to demonstrably false or misleading information and more broadly in political communication, where its meaning and implications remain debated.

== Etymology ==
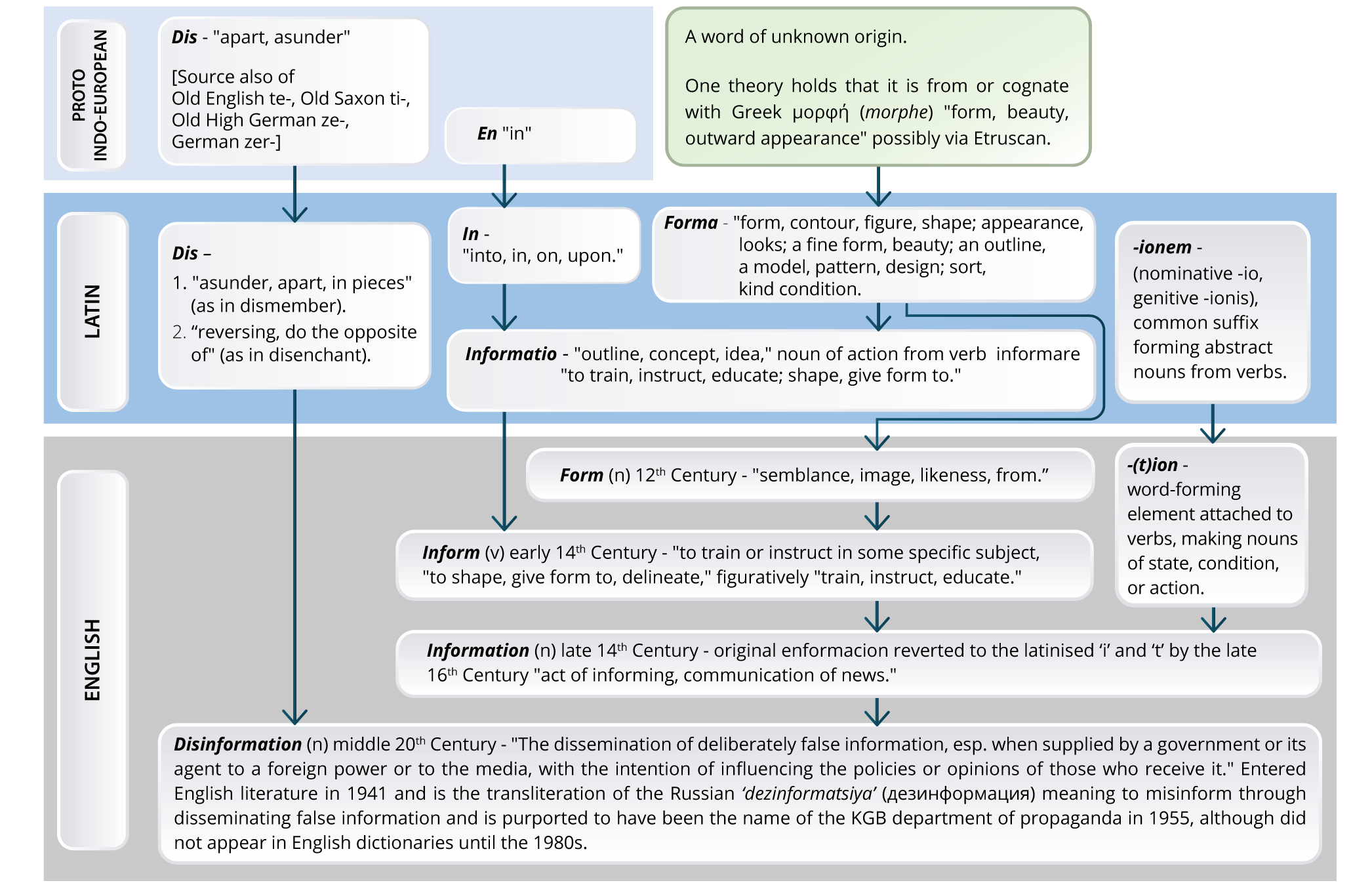
The Etymology of Disinformation by H. Newman as published in The Journal of Information Warfare in 2021. Elements of the word disinformation have their origins in Proto-Indo-European language family. The Latin 'dis' and 'in' and can both be considered to have Proto-Indo-European roots, 'forma' is considerably more obscure. The green box in the figure highlights the origin 'forma' is uncertain, however, it may have its roots in the Aristotelian concept of μορφή (morphe) where something becomes a 'thing' when it has 'form' or substance.

The English word disinformation comes from the application of the Latin prefix dis- to information making the meaning "reversal or removal of information". The rarely used word had appeared with this usage in print at least as far back as 1887. Some consider it a loan translation of the Russian дезинформация, transliterated as dezinformatsiya, apparently derived from the title of a KGB black propaganda department. Soviet planners in the 1950s defined disinformation as "dissemination (in the press, on the radio, etc.) of false reports intended to mislead public opinion."

Disinformation first made an appearance in dictionaries in 1985, specifically, Webster's New College Dictionary and the American Heritage Dictionary. In 1986, the term disinformation was not defined in Webster's New World Thesaurus or New Encyclopædia Britannica. After the Soviet term became widely known in the 1980s, native speakers of English broadened the term as "any government communication (either overt or covert) containing intentionally false and misleading material, often combined selectively with true information, which seeks to mislead and manipulate either elites or a mass audience."

By 1990, use of the term disinformation had fully established itself in the English language within the lexicon of politics. By 2001, the term disinformation had come to be known as simply a more civil phrase for saying someone was lying. Stanley B. Cunningham wrote in his 2002 book The Idea of Propaganda that disinformation had become pervasively used as a synonym for propaganda.

== Operationalization ==
The Shorenstein Center at Harvard University defines disinformation research as an academic field that studies "the spread and impacts of misinformation, disinformation, and media manipulation", including "how it spreads through online and offline channels, and why people are susceptible to believing bad information, and successful strategies for mitigating its impact". According to a 2023 research article published in New Media & Society, disinformation circulates on social media through deception campaigns implemented in multiple ways including: astroturfing, conspiracy theories, clickbait, culture wars, echo chambers, hoaxes, fake news, propaganda, pseudoscience, and rumors.

Glossary of key terms related to disinformation and misinformation
Term	Description	Term	Description
Astroturfing	A centrally coordinated campaign that mimics grassroots activism by making participants pretend to be ordinary citizens	Fake news	Genre: The deliberate creation of pseudo-journalism Label: The instrumentalization of the term to delegitimize news media
Conspiracy theories	Rebuttals of official accounts that propose alternative explanations in which individuals or groups act in secret	Greenwashing	Deceptive communication makes people believe that a company is environmentally responsible when it is not
Clickbait	The deliberate use of misleading headlines and thumbnails to increase online traffic for profit or popularity	Propaganda	Organized mass communication, on a hidden agenda, and with a mission to conform belief and action by circumventing individual reasoning
Culture wars	A phenomenon in which multiple groups of people, who hold entrenched values, attempt to steer public policy contentiously	Pseudoscience	Accounts that claim the explanatory power of science, borrow its language and legitimacy but diverge substantially from its quality criteria
Doxxing	A form of online harassment that breaches privacy boundaries by releasing information intending physical and online harm to a target	Rumors	Unsubstantiated news stories that circulate while not corroborated or validated
Echo chamber	An epistemic environment in which participants encounter beliefs and opinions that coincide with their own	Trolling	Networked groups of digital influencers that operate 'click armies' designed to mobilize public sentiment
Hoax	News in which false facts are presented as legitimate	Urban legends	Moral tales featuring durable stories of intruders incurring boundary transgressions and their dire consequences

In order to distinguish between similar terms, including misinformation and malinformation, scholars collectively agree on the definitions for each term as follows: (1) disinformation is the strategic dissemination of false information with the intention to cause public harm; (2) misinformation represents the unintentional spread of false information; and (3) malinformation is factual information disseminated with the intention to cause harm, these terms are abbreviated 'DMMI'.

In 2019, Camille François devised the "ABC" framework of understanding different modalities of online disinformation:

- Manipulative Actors, who "engage knowingly and with clear intent in viral deception campaigns" that are "covert, designed to obfuscate the identity and intent of the actor orchestrating them." Examples include personas such as Guccifer 2.0, Internet trolls, state media, and military operatives.
- Deceptive Behavior, which "encompasses the variety of techniques viral deception actors may use to enhance and exaggerate the reach, virality and impact of their campaigns." Examples include troll farms, Internet bots, astroturfing, and "paid engagement".
- Harmful Content, which includes health misinformation, manipulated media such as deepfakes, online harassment, violent extremism, hate speech or terrorism.

In 2020, the Brookings Institution proposed amending this framework to include Distribution, defined by the "technical protocols that enable, constrain, and shape user behavior in a virtual space". Similarly, the Carnegie Endowment for International Peace proposed adding Degree ("distribution of the content ... and the audiences it reaches") and Effect ("how much of a threat a given case poses").

=== Comparisons with propaganda ===
Whether and to what degree disinformation and propaganda overlap is subject to debate. Some (like U.S. Department of State) define propaganda as the use of non-rational arguments to either advance or undermine a political ideal, and use disinformation as an alternative name for undermining propaganda, while others consider them to be separate concepts altogether. One popular distinction holds that disinformation also describes politically motivated messaging designed explicitly to engender public cynicism, uncertainty, apathy, distrust, and paranoia, all of which disincentivize citizen engagement and mobilization for social or political change.

== Practice ==
Disinformation is the label often given to foreign information manipulation and interference (FIMI). Studies on disinformation are often concerned with the content of activity whereas the broader concept of FIMI is more concerned with the "behaviour of an actor" that is described through the military doctrine concept of tactics, techniques, and procedures (TTPs).

Disinformation is primarily carried out by government intelligence agencies, but has also been used by non-governmental organizations and businesses. Front groups are a form of disinformation, as they mislead the public about their true objectives and who their controllers are. Most recently, disinformation has been deliberately spread through social media in the form of "fake news", disinformation masked as legitimate news articles and meant to mislead readers or viewers. Disinformation may include distribution of forged documents, manuscripts, and photographs, or spreading dangerous rumours and fabricated intelligence. Use of these tactics can lead to blowback, however, causing such unintended consequences such as defamation lawsuits or damage to the dis-informer's reputation.

Disinformation can spread with greater ease in situations where there is a lack of credible information on a topic, such as a crisis. The implications of this were seen after the 2024 Southport stabbings, where the spread of disinformation regarding the killer's background was fuelled by reporting restrictions, meaning that there were no facts to counter the disinformation. This then led to the 2024 United Kingdom riots.

== Worldwide ==
Disinformation has been identified as a significant challenge, undermining public trust and the factual basis for public debate. Studies have found that false information often spreads faster and more widely online than accurate information. Empirical research has also links disinformation to political polarisation, democratic erosion, and regime resilience in authoritarian contexts.

=== Soviet disinformation ===
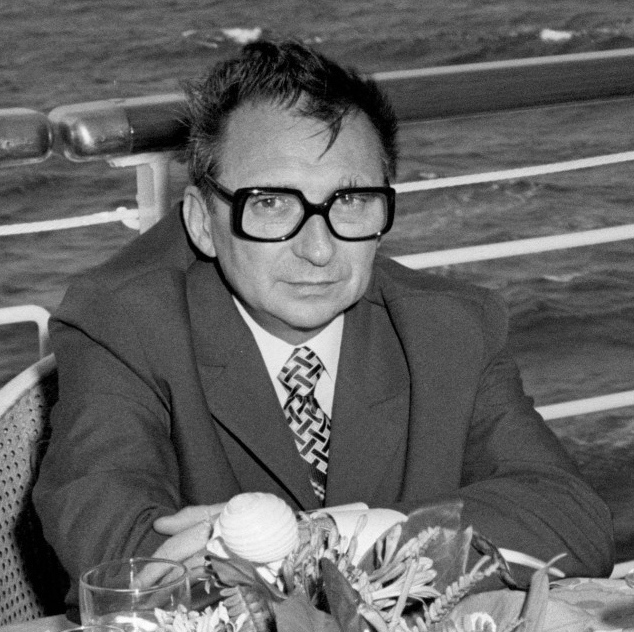
Former Romanian secret police senior official Ion Mihai Pacepa exposed disinformation history in his book Disinformation (2013).

Use of disinformation as a Soviet tactical weapon started in 1923, when it became a tactic used in the Soviet political warfare called active measures.

=== Russian disinformation ===
Russian disinformation campaigns have occurred in many countries. For example, disinformation campaigns led by Yevgeny V. Prigozhin, a Russian oligarch, have been reported in several African countries. Russia denies that it uses disinformation to influence public opinion. Often Russian campaigns aim to disrupt domestic politics within Europe and the United States in an attempt to weaken the West due to its long-standing commitment to fight back against "Western imperialism" and shift the balance of world power to Russia and its allies (the Second World during the Cold War era). According to Voice of America, Russia seeks to promote American isolationism, border security concerns and racial tensions within the United States through its disinformation campaigns.

=== Chinese disinformation ===
Spamouflage (also known under the names Dragonbridge, Spamouflage Dragon, Storm 1376 and Taizi Flood) is an online propaganda and disinformation operation. Since 2017, it has used a network of social media accounts to make posts in favor of the Chinese Communist Party and government of the People's Republic of China and harass dissidents and journalists overseas.

=== American disinformation ===
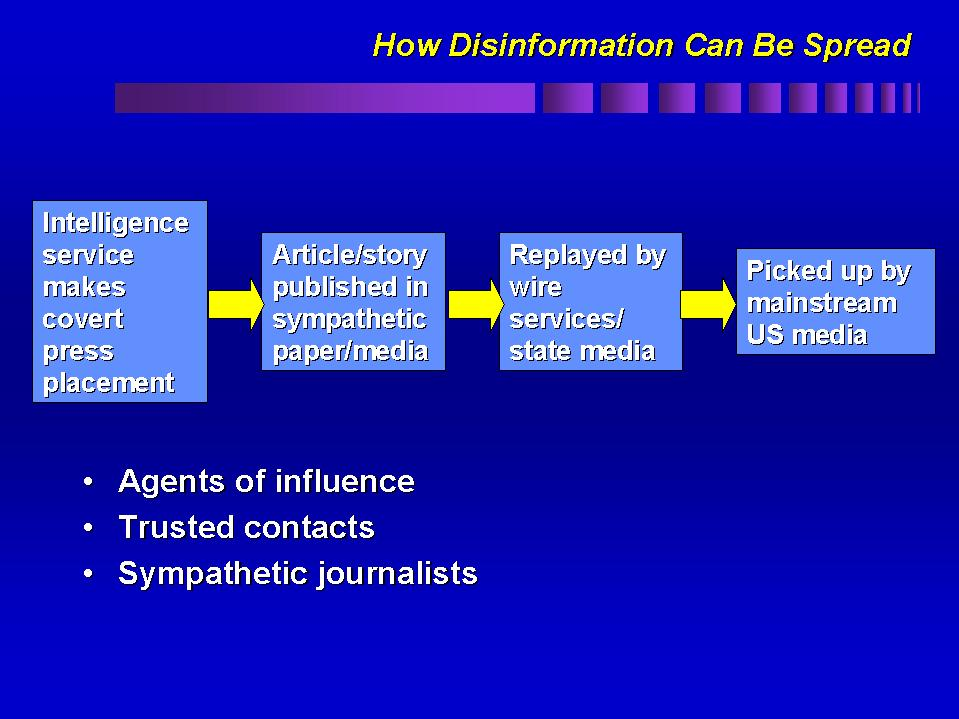
How Disinformation Can Be Spread, explanation by U.S. Defense Department (2001)

The United States Intelligence Community appropriated use of the term disinformation in the 1950s from the Russian dezinformatsiya, and began to use similar strategies, starting during Cold War, and in conflict with other nations. The New York Times reported in 2000 that during the CIA's effort to substitute Mohammed Reza Pahlavi for then-Prime Minister of Iran Mohammad Mossadegh, the CIA placed fictitious stories in the local newspaper. Reuters documented how, subsequent to the 1979 Soviet Union invasion of Afghanistan during the Soviet–Afghan War, the CIA put false articles in newspapers of Islamic-majority countries, inaccurately stating that Soviet embassies had "invasion day celebrations". Reuters noted a former U.S. intelligence officer said they would attempt to gain the confidence of reporters and use them as secret agents, to affect a nation's politics by way of their local media.

In October 1986, the term gained increased currency in the U.S. when it was revealed that two months previously, the Reagan Administration had engaged in a disinformation campaign against then-leader of Libya Muammar Gaddafi. White House representative Larry Speakes said reports of a planned attack on Libya as first broken by The Wall Street Journal on August 25, 1986, were "authoritative", and other newspapers including The Washington Post then wrote articles saying this was factual. U.S. State Department representative Bernard Kalb resigned from his position in protest over the disinformation campaign, and said: "Faith in the word of America is the pulse beat of our democracy."

The executive branch of the Reagan administration kept watch on disinformation campaigns through three yearly publications by the Department of State: Active Measures: A Report on the Substance and Process of Anti-U.S. Disinformation and Propaganda Campaigns (1986); Report on Active Measures and Propaganda, 1986–87 (1987); and Report on Active Measures and Propaganda, 1987–88 (1989).

According to a report by Reuters, the United States ran a propaganda campaign to spread disinformation about the Sinovac Chinese COVID-19 vaccine, including using fake social media accounts to spread the disinformation that the Sinovac vaccine contained pork-derived ingredients and was therefore haram under Islamic law. Reuters said the ChinaAngVirus disinformation campaign was designed to "counter what it perceived as China's growing influence in the Philippines" and was prompted by the "[fear] that China's COVID diplomacy and propaganda could draw other Southeast Asian countries, such as Cambodia and Malaysia, closer to Beijing". The campaign was also described as "payback for Beijing's efforts to blame Washington for the pandemic". The campaign primarily targeted people in the Philippines and used a social media hashtag for "China is the virus" in Tagalog. The campaign ran from 2020 to mid-2021. The primary contractor for the U.S. military on the project was General Dynamics IT, which received $493 million for its role.

Since 2023, Republican members of the US Congress have attacked researchers who study disinformation as being against freedom of speech and as a euphemism for government censorship. On April 18, 2025, citing an Executive Order signed by Trump, the US National Science Foundation released a statement cancelling funding for disinformation research, saying that it does not fit with the NSF priorities, "including but not limited to those on diversity, equity, and inclusion (DEI) and misinformation/disinformation."

=== Disinformation in the 2016 United Kingdom European Union membership referendum ===
The 2016 United Kingdom European Union membership referendum saw figures from the Leave campaign spread disinformation on social media. Many of these arguments played on voters' emotions and attachments, such as the claim that the £350 million that the UK sent to the EU each week could be allocated to the NHS instead, which made them highly effective. Ofcom requires news broadcasters to remain neutral, yet this adherence to neutrality created false balance in the Brexit debate, causing broadcasters to inadvertedly promote disinformation.

== Response ==
=== Responses from cultural leaders ===
Pope Francis condemned disinformation in a 2016 interview, after being made the subject of a fake news website during the 2016 U.S. election cycle which falsely claimed that he supported Donald Trump. He stated that the worst thing the news media could do was spread disinformation and said the act was a sin, comparing those who spread disinformation to individuals who engage in coprophilia.

=== Ethics in warfare ===
In a contribution to the 2014 book Military Ethics and Emerging Technologies, writers David Danks and Joseph H. Danks discuss the ethical implications in using disinformation as a tactic during information warfare. They note there has been a significant degree of philosophical debate over the issue as related to the ethics of war and use of the technique. The writers describe a position whereby the use of disinformation is occasionally allowed, but not in all situations. Typically the ethical test to consider is whether the disinformation was performed out of a motivation of good faith and acceptable according to the rules of war. By this test, the tactic during World War II of putting fake inflatable tanks in visible locations on the Pacific Islands in order to falsely present the impression that there were larger military forces present would be considered as ethically permissible. Conversely, disguising a munitions plant as a healthcare facility in order to avoid attack would be outside the bounds of acceptable use of disinformation during war.

== Research ==
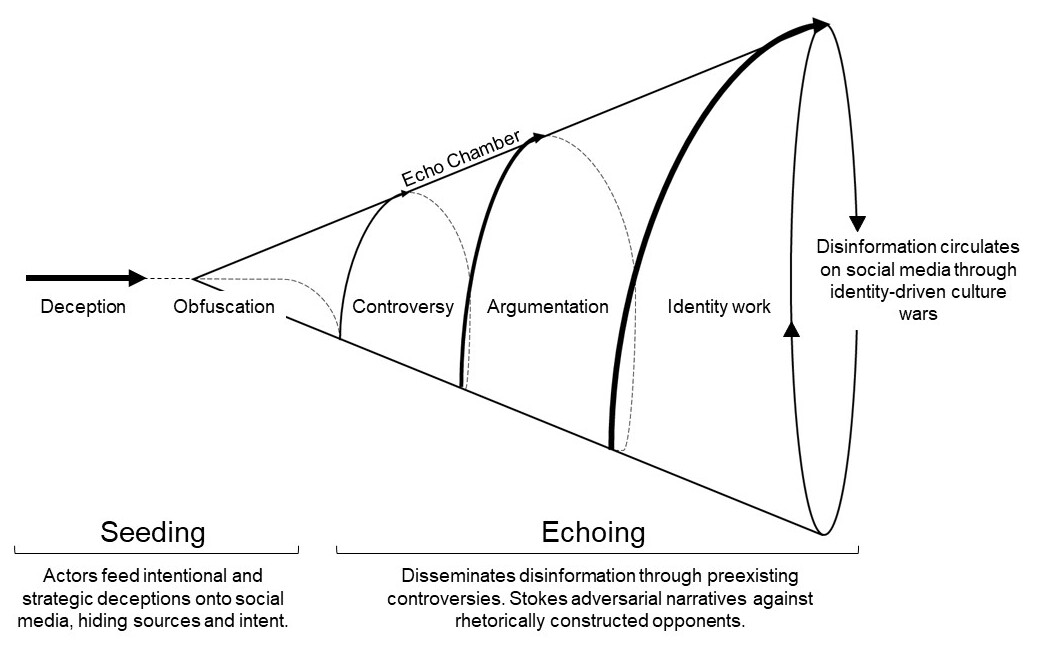
Disinformation spreads through controversies.

Research related to disinformation studies is increasing as an applied area of inquiry. The call to formally classify disinformation as a cybersecurity threat is made by advocates due to its increase in social networking sites. Despite the proliferation of social media websites, Facebook and Twitter showed the most activity in terms of active disinformation campaigns. Techniques reported on included the use of bots to amplify hate speech, the illegal harvesting of data, and paid trolls to harass and threaten journalists.

Whereas disinformation research focuses primarily on how actors orchestrate deceptions on social media, primarily via fake news, new research investigates how people take what started as deceptions and circulate them as their personal views. As a result, research shows that disinformation can be conceptualized as a program that encourages engagement in oppositional fantasies (i.e., culture wars), through which disinformation circulates as rhetorical ammunition for never-ending arguments. As disinformation entangles with culture wars, identity-driven controversies constitute a vehicle through which disinformation disseminates on social media. This means that disinformation thrives, not despite raucous grudges but because of them. The reason is that controversies provide fertile ground for never-ending debates that solidify points of view.

Scholars have pointed out that disinformation is not only a foreign threat as domestic purveyors of disinformation are also leveraging traditional media outlets such as newspapers, radio stations, and television news media to disseminate false information. Current research suggests right-wing online political activists in the United States may be more likely to use disinformation as a strategy and tactic. The 2016 European Union referendum in the UK also saw British politicians supporting the Leave campaign spread disinformation on Twitter. The Conservative Party was also accused of spreading disinformation about the Labour Party in the lead-up to the 2019 General Election. Governments have responded with a wide range of policies to address concerns about the potential threats that disinformation poses to democracy, however, there is little agreement in elite policy discourse or academic literature as to what it means for disinformation to threaten democracy, and how different policies might help to counter its negative implications.

=== Consequences of exposure to disinformation online ===
There is a broad consensus amongst scholars that there is a high degree of disinformation, misinformation, and propaganda online; however, it is unclear to what extent such disinformation has on political attitudes in the public and, therefore, political outcomes. This conventional wisdom has come mostly from investigative journalists, with a particular rise during the 2016 U.S. election: some of the earliest work came from Craig Silverman at Buzzfeed News. Cass Sunstein supported this in #Republic, arguing that the internet would become rife with echo chambers and informational cascades of misinformation leading to a highly polarized and ill-informed society. Later studies have since proven the existence of echo chambers on social media.

Research after the 2016 US presidential election found: (1) for 14% of Americans social media was their "most important" source of election news; 2) known false news stories "favoring Trump were shared a total of 30 million times on Facebook, while those favoring Clinton were shared 8 million times"; 3) the average American adult saw fake news stories, "with just over half of those who recalled seeing them believing them"; and 4) people are more likely to "believe stories that favor their preferred candidate, especially if they have ideologically segregated social media networks." Correspondingly, whilst there is wide agreement that the digital spread and uptake of disinformation during the 2016 election was massive and very likely facilitated by foreign agents, there is an ongoing debate on whether all this had any actual effect on the election. For example, a double blind randomized-control experiment by researchers from the London School of Economics (LSE), found that exposure to online fake news about either Trump or Clinton had no significant effect on intentions to vote for those candidates. Researchers who examined the influence of Russian disinformation on Twitter during the 2016 US presidential campaign found that exposure to disinformation was (1) concentrated among a tiny group of users, (2) primarily among Republicans, and (3) eclipsed by exposure to legitimate political news media and politicians. Finally, they find "no evidence of a meaningful relationship between exposure to the Russian foreign influence campaign and changes in attitudes, polarization, or voting behavior." As such, despite its mass dissemination during the 2016 Presidential Elections, online fake news or disinformation probably did not cost Hillary Clinton the votes needed to secure the presidency.

Research on this topic remains inconclusive, for example, misinformation appears not to significantly change political knowledge of those exposed to it. There seems to be a higher level of diversity of news sources that users are exposed to on Facebook and Twitter than conventional wisdom would dictate, as well as a higher frequency of cross-spectrum discussion. Other evidence has found that disinformation campaigns rarely succeed in altering the foreign policies of the targeted states.

Research is also challenging because disinformation is meant to be difficult to detect and some social media companies have discouraged outside research efforts. For example, researchers found disinformation made "existing detection algorithms from traditional news media ineffective or not applicable...[because disinformation] is intentionally written to mislead readers...[and] users' social engagements with fake news produce data that is big, incomplete, unstructured, and noisy." Facebook, the largest social media company, has been criticized by analytical journalists and scholars for preventing outside research of disinformation.

=== Alternative perspectives and critiques ===
Researchers have criticized the framing of disinformation as being limited to technology platforms, removed from its wider political context and inaccurately implying that the media landscape was otherwise well-functioning. "The field possesses a simplistic understanding of the effects of media technologies; overemphasizes platforms and underemphasizes politics; focuses too much on the United States and Anglocentric analysis; has a shallow understanding of political culture and culture in general; lacks analysis of race, class, gender, and sexuality as well as status, inequality, social structure, and power; has a thin understanding of journalistic processes; and, has progressed more through the exigencies of grant funding than the development of theory and empirical findings."

Alternative perspectives have been proposed:

1. Moving beyond fact-checking and media literacy to study a pervasive phenomenon as something that involves more than news consumption.
2. Moving beyond technical solutions including AI-enhanced fact checking to understand the systemic basis of disinformation.
3. Develop a theory that goes beyond Americentrism to develop a global perspective, understand cultural imperialism and Third World dependency on Western news, and understand disinformation in the Global South.
4. Develop market-oriented disinformation research that examines the financial incentives and business models that nudge content creators and digital platforms to circulate disinformation online.
5. Include a multidisciplinary approach, involving history, political economy, ethnic studies, feminist studies, and science and technology studies.
6. Develop understandings of Gendered-based disinformation (GBD) defined as "the dissemination of false or misleading information attacking women (especially political leaders, journalists and public figures), basing the attack on their identity as women."

== Strategies for spreading disinformation ==
=== Disinformation attack ===
The research literature on how disinformation spreads is growing. Studies show that disinformation spread in social media can be classified into two broad stages: seeding and echoing. "Seeding", when malicious actors strategically insert deceptions, like fake news, into a social media ecosystem, and "echoing" is when the audience disseminates disinformation argumentatively as their own opinions often by incorporating disinformation into a confrontational fantasy.

=== Internet manipulation ===
Separate from factual reporting, techniques such as rage baiting, outrage porn, etc. involve media broadcast of content designed to manipulate increased viewer engagement, often by provoking negative emotional responses aligned with political or other narratives.

Internet manipulation is the use of online digital technologies, including algorithms, social bots, and automated scripts, for commercial, social, military, or political purposes. Internet and social media manipulation are the prime vehicles for spreading disinformation due to the importance of digital platforms for media consumption and everyday communication. When employed for political purposes, internet manipulation may be used to steer public opinion, polarise citizens, circulate conspiracy theories, and silence political dissidents. Internet manipulation can also be done for profit, for instance, to harm corporate or political adversaries and improve brand reputation. Internet manipulation is sometimes also used to describe the selective enforcement of Internet censorship or selective violations of net neutrality.

Internet manipulation for propaganda purposes with the help of data analysis and internet bots in social media is called computational propaganda.

Studies show four main methods of seeding disinformation online:

1. Selective censorship
2. Manipulation of search rankings
3. Hacking and releasing
4. Directly sharing disinformation

Recently, concerns have been expressed that AI technology could enable groups of AI programs, known as 'AI swarms,' to autonomously coordinate to manipulate democratic discourse, by maintaining persistent fake identities and mimicking human social dynamics over extended periods of time.

=== Exploiting online advertising technologies ===
Disinformation is amplified online due to malpractice concerning online advertising, especially the machine-to-machine interactions of real-time bidding systems. Online advertising technologies have been used to amplify disinformation due to the financial incentives and monetization of user-generated content and fake news. The lax oversight over the online advertising market can be used to amplify disinformation, including the use of dark money used for political advertising.

== See also ==
- Active Measures Working Group
- Agitprop
- Artificial intelligence and elections
- Chinese information operations and information warfare
- Counter Misinformation Team
- Demoralization (warfare)
- Denial and deception
- Disinformation in the Russian invasion of Ukraine
- The Disinformation Project
- False flag
- Fear, uncertainty and doubt
- Firehose of falsehood
- Gaslighting
- Illusory truth effect
- Internet manipulation
- Knowledge falsification
- Media manipulation
- Military deception
- Post-truth politics
- Social engineering (political science)
- State-sponsored Internet propaganda
