= Jerry Seelen =

American screenwriter and lyricist (1912–1981)

- Born: Jerome Lincoln Seelen; March 11, 1912; New York City, US
- Died: September 12, 1981 (aged 69); San Diego, California, US
- Occupations: Screenwriter; Lyricist
- Years active: 1936–1965
- Notable work: C'est si bon (1949)
- Spouse: Betty Hall (m. 1949; div. 1957)
- Children: 2

Jerome Lincoln Seelen (March 11, 1912 - September 12, 1981) was an American screenwriter and lyricist .

== Biography ==
Jerry Seelen wrote lyrics for songs in musical films and wrote screenplays for radio and television.

During his lyricist career, he wrote many songs for Milton Berle and Danny Thomas.

In 1949, he wrote the English lyrics to the French song "C'est si bon" that is recorded by Johnny Desmond with Tony Mottola and his Orchestra in January 1950.

On June 26, 1950, Louis Armstrong recorded the song with Sy Oliver and his Orchestra and his cover was a worldwide hit.

In 1951, Dolores Gray sings the song in the short film Holiday in Paris: Paris which is the first film where the song is sung in English.

== Personal life ==
Jerry Seelen married in 1949 in Los Angeles the model Betty Hall (1923–2001). The couple had two children. They divorced in 1957.

== Radio ==
- 1943–1946: The Bird's Eye Open House
- 1944–1951: Post Toasties Time
- 1946–1947: Drene Time

== Revues ==
- 1942: New Priorities of 1943 (music by Lester Lee) at the Richard Rodgers Theatre.
- 1942–1943: Star and Garter (music by Lester Lee) at the Music Box Theatre.
- 1943–1944: Ziegfeld Follies (music by Lester Lee) at the Winter Garden Theatre and at the Imperial Theatre.

== Cinema and television ==
=== Screenplays ===
- 1952 :
  - The Colgate Comedy Hour
  - Four Star Revue
  - The Buick Circus Hour
- 1953 :
  - The Buick Circus Hour
  - Texaco Star Theatre
- 1954 :
  - Texaco Star Theatre
  - The Saturday Night Revue
- 1958 :
  - The Pat Boone Chevy Showroom
- 1960 :
  - The Revlon Revue
- 1963 :
  - My Favorite Martian (season 1, episode 5)
  - Glynis (season 1, episode 7)
- 1964 :
  - Petticoat Junction (season 1, episodes 22, 29 and 35)
  - The Farmer's Daughter (season 2, episode 5)
  - The Addams Family (season 1, episode 13)
- 1965 :
  - I Dream of Jeannie (season 1, episode 9)

=== Songs ===
- 1936 :
  - The Monkeys have no Tails in Zamboanga (music by Don Raye and Vic Schoen) in Night Waitress
- 1943 :
  - Lament of a Laundry Girl (music by Dan Shapiro and Lester Lee) in Crazy House
  - I'm a Heavy Tipper and Poor Polly (music by Lester Lee) in The Woman of the Town
  - At the Mardi Gras (music by Lester Lee) in Mardi Gras
- 1944 :
  - Nothing Can Replace a Man, Look what you did to Me, Love is This, Ooh-Ah-Oh and How did it Happen ? (music by Lester Lee) in You Can't Ration Love
  - Take it Big, I'm a Big Success (With You), Lucky, Lucky Boy and Love and Learn (music by Lester Lee) in Take It Big
  - I'm a Woman of the World (music by Saul Chaplin) in Louisiana Hayride
  - The Barn Dance Polka (music by Lester Lee) in National Barn Dance
  - Headin' Home (music by Lester Lee) in Lucky Cowboy
- 1948 :
  - Yippee-o, Yippie-ai (music by Walter Popp) in Big City
  - When you're Playing with Fire (music by Hal Borne) in Julia Misbehaves
- 1951 :
  - Lament to the Pots and Pans (music by Earl K. Brent) in Call Me Mister
  - You're Dependable and We'd Like to Go on a Trip (music by Sy Miller) in Lullaby of Broadway
- 1952 :
  - Living the Life I Love, I Hear the Music Now, What are New Yorkers Made Of and Hush-A-Bye (music by Sammy Fain) in The Jazz Singer
  - You Can't Blame Polly (music by Lester Lee) in Flaming Feather
