= Carnival in Flanders (musical) =

1934 musical by Burk and Van Heusen

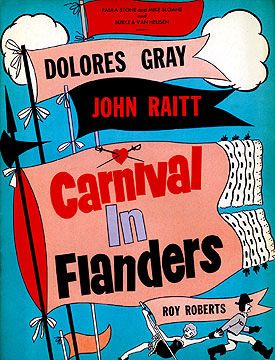
- Original Poster
- Music: Jimmy Van Heusen
- Lyrics: Johnny Burke
- Book: Preston Sturges
- Basis: 1934 French comedy film La Kermesse Héroïque
- Productions: 1953 Broadway

Carnival in Flanders is a musical with a book by Preston Sturges, lyrics by Johnny Burke, and music by Jimmy Van Heusen.

Based on the 1934 French comedy film La Kermesse Héroïque, it is set in 1616 in the small Flemish village of Flackenburg, where a Spanish duke and his entourage descend upon the community. The mayor plays dead, hoping that his ruse will force the visitors to depart, but the duke sets his sights on the man's "widow" and begins to woo her. The musical had a brief run on Broadway in 1953.

The musical is the source of the song "Here's That Rainy Day", which has become a standard.

== Background ==
Harold Arlen was approached to write the score, but the task ultimately fell to Van Heusen and Burke. Bing Crosby was providing much of the financing for the production and had great faith in the songwriting team, who had written several of his hits, despite the fact that their previous theatrical collaboration, Nellie Bly (1946), had been a critical and commercial flop.

George Oppenheimer, one of the book's original co-writers, withdrew from the project during pre-Broadway tryouts in Philadelphia, and Dorothy Fields joined her brother Herbert to help with rewrites. Eventually all their work was discarded by Sturges, who replaced Bretaigne Windust as director and completely reworked the book before the show reached California for a series of stagings by light opera companies prior to the New York City opening. Choreographer Jack Cole was replaced by Helen Tamiris, and several cast changes were made before the troubled production finally opened on Broadway.

== Broadway production ==
Carnival in Flanders opened on September 8, 1953 at the New Century Theatre, where it ran for only six performances. The cast included John Raitt, Dolores Gray, and Roy Roberts. Critics were enchanted by Oliver Smith's sets and Lucinda Ballard's costumes, inspired by Brueghel paintings, and Gray's lively performance, but universally panned every other aspect of the production. In his review for The New York Times, Brooks Atkinson wrote "As an actress [Dolores Gray] is authoritative enough to bring down the house with some of the maudlin songs...In the version prepared for the stage by Preston Sturges it is laborious and banal... As usual, the theatre has lavished a lot of wealth and talent on this hokum. Lucinda Ballard has dressed everybody to the nines... Although Oliver Smith's scenery is cluttered and rather desperate, there is certainly a lot of it."

According to Sturges, the available rehearsal time prior to the Broadway opening was not sufficient for the actors to be comfortable with the changes, and he attributes this as the reason for the play's commercial and critical failure. If remembered at all, it is primarily as the source of the Van Heusen-Burke standard "Here's That Rainy Day."

== Characters and songs ==
- Jan Breugel
- The Butcher
- The Inkeeper
- The Barber-Surgeon
- The Fishermonger
- Lisa, the Inkeepers wife
- Else, The Barber-Surgeon wife
- Marie, The Fishermonger's wife
- The Burgomaster
- Cornelia
- Siska
- The Duke D'olivares
- The Courier

Act I

- Ring the Bell
- The Very Necessary You
- It's a Fine Old Institution
- I'm One of Your Admirers
- The Plundering of the Town
- The Stronger Sex
- The Sudden Thrill
- It's an Old Spanish Custom
- A Seventeen Gun Salute

Act II

- You're Dead!
- Here's That Rainy Day
- Take the Word of a Gentleman
- A Moment of Your Love
- How Far Can a Lady Go?

== Awards and honors ==
Dolores Gray won the Tony Award for Best Actress in a Musical. It remains the shortest-lived Tony-honored performance ever.
