= Dolores Gray =

American actress (1924–2002)

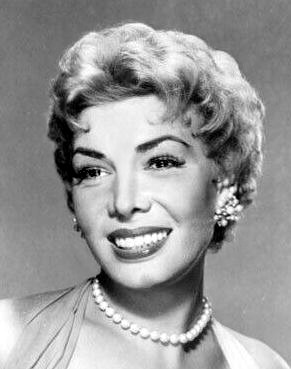
- Born: June 7, 1924; Los Angeles, California, U.S.
- Died: June 26, 2002 (aged 78); New York City, U.S.
- Occupations: Actress, singer
- Years active: 1941–1989
- Spouse: Andrew J. Crevolin (m. 1966; died 1992)
- Awards: Tony Award for Best Performance by a Leading Actress in a Musical; Carnival in Flanders (1954)

Dolores Gray (June 7, 1924 – June 26, 2002) was an American actress and singer. She was nominated for the Tony Award for Best Lead Actress in a Musical twice, winning once.

== Early life ==
Both her mother and father were vaudeville actors, which is how they met. Gray's parents divorced when she was a young child. She had an older brother, Richard Gray, who also had a career in Hollywood. While attending Polytechnic High School she was in the Girls' Glee Club. She was discovered by Rudy Vallee, who gave her a guest spot on his nationwide radio show.

== Career ==
Her career commenced as a cabaret artist in restaurants and supper clubs in California and in Reno, Nevada. In Los Angeles in 1941 she appeared at the Pirate's Den and Hollywood Playhouse. Later that year San Francisco engagements included one at Stairway to the Stars. Gray returned to Los Angeles in early April 1942; she headlined at Slapsy Maxie's late that year. In Los Angeles, on 1 April 1943, she was the victim of a drive-by sidewalk shooting, fracturing her left humerus. That July, she sang at the city's Biltmore Bowl.

In 1945 she appeared in her own radio program, and that same year starred in the Broadway musical Are You with It? While she was appearing in Annie Get Your Gun in London (1947–1950), she studied at the Royal Academy of Dramatic Art in 1948. As a fundraiser to help rebuild the RADA theatre, she appeared as Nell Gwyn in In Good King Charles's Golden Days at Drury Lane Theatre (Oct 1948).

Gray was briefly signed with MGM, appearing in Kismet (1955), It's Always Fair Weather (1955), and The Opposite Sex (1956).

Portraying a singing and dancing stage actress, she appeared with Gregory Peck and Lauren Bacall in the film Designing Woman (1957) as his former romantic interest. During her music career, she sang Marilyn Monroe's part on the Decca Records soundtrack album of There's No Business Like Show Business (1954).

She appeared at the London Palladium in 1958 while doing a concert tour of Europe and in cabaret at The Talk of the Town in February 1963. Among her many stage roles, she appeared in Two on the Aisle (1951), Carnival In Flanders (1953), Destry Rides Again (1959), Sherry! (1967), and 42nd Street (1986). She also performed the lead role in Annie Get Your Gun in its first London production (1947). Gray won the Tony Award for Best Actress in a Musical for her role in Carnival in Flanders, even though this Broadway musical, with a script by Preston Sturges, ran for only six performances. She therefore holds a record that is unlikely to be broken: briefest run in a performance which still earned a Tony. She is the first person to have sung the English version of the French song "C'est si bon" for the short film Holiday in Paris: Paris directed by John Nasht.

She was best known for her theatre roles. In 1973 she took over from Angela Lansbury in the London production of Gypsy at the Piccadilly Theatre. In 1987 she starred as Carlotta in the first London production of Stephen Sondheim's Follies at the Shaftesbury Theatre (also recorded) and appeared in the Royal Variety Performance of that year with a performance of the song "I'm Still Here" from the show. In 1978 she also appeared on BBC TV's long-running variety show The Good Old Days – chairman Leonard Sachs had also appeared in Follies as theatre owner Dimitri Weismann, introducing Miss Gray, one of "The Weismann Girls". Theatre critic Michael Phillips wrote that Gray's voice sounded like "a freight-train slathered in honey". In 1988 she appeared in the Doctor Who 25th-anniversary story "Silver Nemesis" playing an American tourist.

Apart from the many soundtrack albums she appeared on, Gray recorded one album of songs in 1957 for Capitol Records with the title Warm Brandy.

== Personal life and marriage ==
In November 1962 Gray's engagement to playboy-entrepreneur James B. Lofland, complete with a 25-carat engagement ring, was announced. An investment enterprise of Lofland's would later be investigated, and on 27 June 1963 Gray appeared before the New York Supreme Court concerning the matter, though she testified that "she had no inkling of any possible fraud in the operation until she read about it in the newspapers". Separately, Gray sued Lofland for $450,000 alleging "he assaulted her in April [1963] in a dispute that ended their engagement". Lofland eventually "admitted masterminding a scheme of selling $3,000,000 of worthless oil leases to his high society friends" and was sentenced to 33–60 months imprisonment for grand larceny and perjury, to be served concurrently with his 10-year sentencing in California for possessing stolen securities.

On September 24, 1966, Gray married Andrew J. Crevolin, a California businessman and Thoroughbred racehorse owner who won the 1954 Kentucky Derby. Despite erroneous reports in the media that they divorced, they remained married until his death in 1992. The couple had no children.

== Death ==
Gray died of a heart attack in Manhattan, aged 78. Upon her death, she was cremated and her ashes interred at Holy Cross Cemetery in Culver City, California.

== Filmography ==
Year	Title	Role	Notes
1942	Lady for a Night	Dolores, a Singer	Uncredited
1944	Mr. Skeffington	Performer	Uncredited
1955	It's Always Fair Weather	Madeline Bradville	
1955	Kismet	Lalume	
1956	The Opposite Sex	Sylvia Fowler	
1957	Designing Woman	Lori Shannon	

== Stage work ==
- Seven Lively Arts (1944)
- Are You with It? (1945)
- Sweet Bye and Bye (1946) (closed on the road)
- Annie Get Your Gun (1947; 1962)
- Two on the Aisle (1951)
- Pygmalion (1952) (summer theatre)
- Carnival in Flanders (1953)
- Can-Can (1957) (summer theatre)
- Silk Stockings (1958–59) (summer theatre)
- Destry Rides Again (1959)
- Lady in the Dark (1959) (summer theatre)
- Sherry! (1967)
- Gypsy (1973, 1976, 1982)
- All Dressed Up (1982)
- Going Hollywood (1983) (workshop)
- 42nd Street (1986)
- Star Dust (1987) (concert reading)
- Follies (1987)
- Broadway at the Bowl (1988)
