= Château de Chaintré =

Coordinates: 46.2575°N 4.7761°E

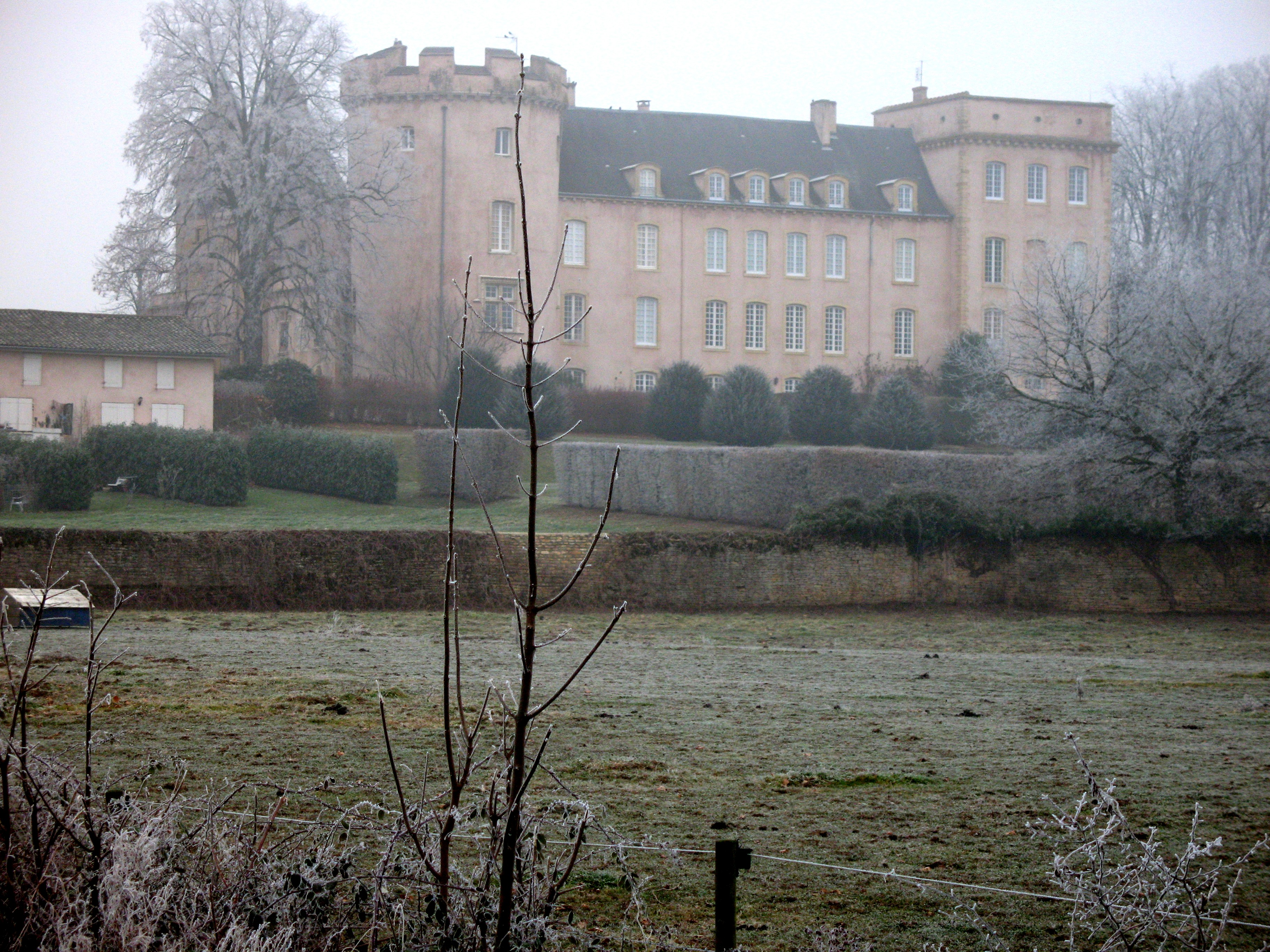
- The Château de Chaintré in 2007
- Interactive map of the Château de Chaintré area

General information
- Type: château
- Location: Crêches-sur-Saône, France

The Château de Chaintré is a historic château in Crêches-sur-Saône, Saône-et-Loire, France.
