= Satchmo the Great =

- Theatrical release poster
- Produced by: Edward R. Murrow; Fred W. Friendly
- Starring: Louis Armstrong; Edward R. Murrow; W. C. Handy; Leonard Bernstein
- Production company: United Artists
- Release date: October 4, 1957
- Country: United States
- Language: English

Satchmo the Great is a 1957 American documentary film chronicling Louis Armstrong's 1955 international tour. Co-produced by Edward R. Murrow and Fred W. Friendly, the film features material recorded for an episode of Murrow's See It Now newsmagazine. It premiered at the Garrick Theater on October 4, 1957.

Columbia Records simultaneously released an album featuring the audio from the film.
