= Camille François =

French digital disinformation researcher

- François in 2011
- Education: Sciences Po (MA); Columbia University (MA)
- Years active: 2013-present
- Known for: cyberwarfare, digital disinformation, public AI
- Website: Camille François on X

Camille François is a French researcher working on cyber security and digital safety. She is an assistant professor of practice at Columbia University, leading a program on public interest AI, and President at ROOST.tools, a nonprofit dedicated to open source software for online safety. Camille was previously director of trust & safety at Niantic, an augmented reality company.

== Education and career ==
François holds a master's degree in Public Affairs from the Paris Institute of Political Studies and a master's degree in international security from Columbia University in 2013. She was a Fulbright fellow, a fellow of the Berkman-Klein Center at Harvard University, and served several months at EtaLab France.

She joined Jigsaw, a unit within Google dedicated to exploring threats to open societies. She later joined Graphika as their chief innovation officer. She was featured as a Time 100 Next fellow in 2019 and as an innovator under 35 by theMIT Technology Review. Some of her research focused on cyberpeace, how states are using social media for disinformation and misinformation, and on people working for troll farms such as the Internet Research Agency. She provided testimonies on Russian electoral influence operations for the United States Senate Select Committee on Intelligence.

In 2021 she joined Niantic as their global director of trust & safety. In 2023, she was appointed by Emmanuel Macron as part of a French committee on information and media, and with Maria Ressa founded an innovation lab on AI and democracy at Columbia. In 2024, she joined the faculty at Columbia full-time, and co-organized with Mozilla a series of public convenings on openness and AI.

=== Founding ROOST ===
In February 2025, François founded ROOST (Robust Open Online Safety Tools), a nonprofit building open-source safety infrastructure for digital platforms, incubated at Columbia's School of International and Public Affairs. The organization launched at the Artificial Intelligence Action Summit in Paris with $28 million in initial funding from partners including Eric Schmidt, Discord, OpenAI, Google, Roblox, and the John S. and James L. Knight Foundation. She serves as ROOST's founding president.
