= Mauboussin =

Jewelry company based in France

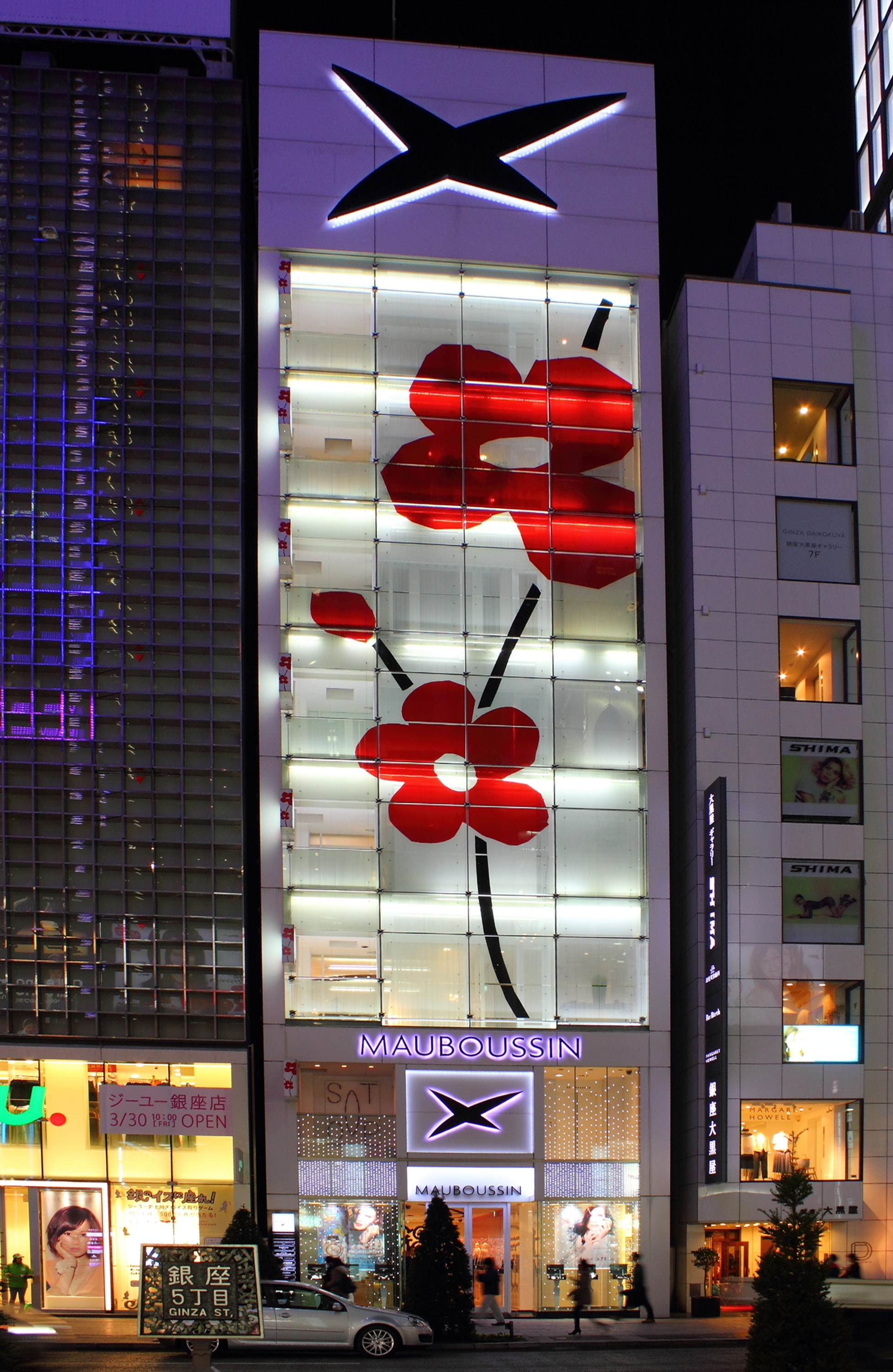
- Mauboussin store in Ginza, Tokyo
- Type: Subsidiary
- Industry: Jewelry
- Founded: 1827; 199 years ago in Paris, France
- Revenue: €60 million (2010–11)
- Parent: Groupe Galeries Lafayette
- Website: mauboussin.com

Mauboussin is a jewelry company based in France. It was originally established in 1827 in Paris, specifically on Rue Grenata, where it focused on producing jewelry. Mauboussin gained early recognition for its participation in international exhibitions, including a bronze medal at the 1878 Universal Exhibition in Paris.

In 1903, M.B. Noury, who was the nephew of Georges Mauboussin, became the owner of the company. Georges Mauboussin had served as the company's director since 1877. In 1923, Noury was succeeded by Mauboussin himself, and the company's name was changed to Mauboussin. As part of the company's expansion, Mauboussin purchased two adjacent houses located at the intersection of Rue Saint-Augustin, Rue de Choiseul, and Rue Monsigny in Paris. The address of these houses was 3 Rue de Choiseul. In 1925, Mauboussin won the gold medal at the Exposition Internationale des Arts Décoratifs in Paris. Between 1928 and 1931, Mauboussin hosted gemstone-themed exhibitions at its Paris showroom. These exhibitions attracted notable clients, including the Prince of Wales and Maharajahs from Kapurthala and Indore.

Mauboussin opened branches in New York, Buenos Aires, and Rio de Janeiro. In the 1930s and 1940s, Mauboussin collaborated with Trabert & Hoeffer, an American jewelry firm. The company gained popularity for its exceptional collection of precious materials and skilled craftsmanship. The company's estimated sales (in 2010–11) were €60 million in total sales and €10 million in watches.

As of 2024, Mauboussin operates over 120 stores worldwide, including locations in Asia, Europe, and North Africa.
