= Asterix films (live action) =

French live-action film series

Asterix & Obelix is a French live-action film franchise, based on the comic book series of the same name by French comic book artists Albert Uderzo and Rene Goscinny. The series includes five theatrically released films. Just like the comic books, the films focus on the adventures of Asterix and Obelix, two Gauls in Roman-occupied Europe. With the help of a magic potion which causes superhuman strength, the Gaul's tiny village manages to resist Rome.

In the first two installments in the franchise, protagonists Asterix and Obelix are played by actors Christian Clavier and Gérard Depardieu. Depardieu is the only actor to appear in four of the films, being replaced by Gilles Lellouche for the fifth film. Except for the first two films the character of Asterix has been portrayed by a different actor each time: Clovis Cornillac for the third film, Edouard Baer for the fourth, and Guillaume Canet for the fifth. Apart from Depardieu and Clavier, the only other actors to appear in more than one film are Sim, who plays the village's oldest resident, Geriatrix, in the first and third film, and Jamel Debbouze, who plays Egyptian architect Edifis in the second and third films. All other roles who reappear during the series are played by a different actor in each film.

The fourth film, Asterix and Obelix: God Save Britannia, was released in 2012. A fifth film, Asterix & Obelix: The Middle Kingdom, was released in 2023.

== Films ==
=== Asterix and Obelix vs. Caesar (1999) ===
Asterix and Obelix vs Caesar is the first live action Asterix film and it describes the adventure of the Gauls against the Roman Empire. The plot is a combination based on several of the Asterix albums by René Goscinny and Albert Uderzo (see the above article about the film). The cast includes several famous actors and many well known French ones. The main stars are Christian Clavier, Gérard Depardieu, Roberto Benigni, Michel Galabru, Claude Piéplu. The film was directed by Claude Zidi, and it was very successful in France and other European countries.

=== Asterix & Obelix: Mission Cleopatra (2002) ===
In Asterix & Obelix: Mission Cleopatra, Asterix and Obelix travel to Egypt to help architect numerobis to build a palace for queen Cleopatra in 90 days because of a bet she made with Julius Caesar.

For this film the plot is based primarily on the sixth Asterix comic book, Asterix and Cleopatra, written by René Goscinny and illustrated by Albert Uderzo. The same comic book was the basis of a 1968 animated film. In this version there are many references to other popular movies like The Matrix, and contemporary jokes which give a different perspective from the previous stories. Clavier and Depardieu reprised their roles as Asterix and Obelix but there were various other changes in the cast and crew of this film, such as Claude Piéplu and Gottfried John who played Getafix and Caesar in the first film being replaced by Claude Rich and Alain Chabat. The film was again a huge success but it was considered to be one of the most expensive films in the history of Europe (more than 50 million dollars). It was directed by Alain Chabat.

This movie is the only Asterix live action movie in which the plot closely follows the plot of the original comic book, Asterix and Cleopatra, without incorporating elements from other stories.

=== Asterix at the Olympic Games (2008) ===
Astérix at the Olympic Games is the third live action Asterix film, released in 2008, and based on the comic book of the same name. Clovis Cornillac replaced Christian Clavier in the role of Asterix. Aside from Gérard Depardieu as Obelix and brief cameos by Sim as Geriatrix and Jamel Debbouze as Edifis none of the cast members from the previous two films returned. The film does have several celebrity cameo appearances by people such as Tony Parker, Zinedine Zidane and Michael Schumacher.

Filming began in June 2006 and the movie was planned to be released close to the date of the Beijing Olympic Games. The budget of the film was estimated to be even higher than the previous Asterix film (possibly almost twice as expensive). It was directed by Frédéric Forestier and Thomas Langmann.

=== Asterix and Obelix: God Save Britannia (2012) ===
Asterix and Obelix: God Save Britannia is the fourth live action Asterix film, and was released in October 2012. It is based on the comic book Asterix in Britain. Edouard Baer replaced Clovis Cornillac (who had replaced Christian Clavier) in the role of Asterix.

=== Asterix & Obelix: The Middle Kingdom (2023) ===
Asterix & Obelix: The Middle Kingdom is the fifth live action Asterix film, and was released in February 2023. Production was originally planned to take place partly in China in 2020, but was postponed to 2021 and relocated to France and Morocco. The film is directed by Guillaume Canet, who also stars as Asterix, while Gilles Lellouche plays Obelix.

== Cast and characters ==
	Asterix and Obelix vs. Caesar (1999)	Asterix & Obelix: Mission Cleopatra (2002)	Asterix at the Olympic Games (2008)	Asterix and Obelix: God Save Britannia (2012)	Asterix & Obelix: The Middle Kingdom (2023)
Gauls
Asterix	Christian Clavier		Clovis Cornillac	Édouard Baer	Guillaume Canet
Obelix	Gérard Depardieu				Gilles Lellouche
Druid Getafix	Claude Piéplu	Claude Rich	Jean-Pierre Cassel		Pierre Richard
Chief Vitalstatistix	Michel Galabru		Éric Thomas	Michel Duchaussoy	Jérôme Commandeur
Cacofonix	Pierre Palmade		Franck Dubosc		Philippe Katerine
Impedimenta	Marianne Sägebrecht		Dorothée Jemma	Gaëlle Jeantet	Audrey Lamy
Unhygienix	Jean-Jacques Devaux		Tony Gaultier		Chicandier
Geriatrix	Sim		Sim		Philippe Canet
Mrs. Geriatrix	Arielle Dombasle		Adriana Karembeu		
Fulliautomatix	Jean-Roger Milo		Eduardo Gómez		André Kalmes
Panacea	Laetitia Casta				Angèle
Romans
Julius Caesar	Gottfried John	Alain Chabat	Alain Delon	Fabrice Luchini	Vincent Cassel
Brutus	Didier Cauchy	Victor Loukianenko	Benoît Poelvoorde		
Crismus Bonus	Jean-Pierre Castaldi		Jean-Pierre Castaldi		
Egyptians
Edifis		Jamel Debbouze			
Criminalis		Gérard Darmon			
Queen Cleopatra		Monica Bellucci			Marion Cotillard
Pirates
Captain Redbeard		Bernard Farcy		Gérard Jugnot	Franck Gastambide
Pegleg		Michel Crémadès		Jacques Herlin	
Pirate Lookout		Mouss Diouf		Christophe Denis	Issa Doumbia
Other characters
Narrator		Pierre Tchernia			Gérard Darmon

=== English voice cast ===
	Asterix and Obelix vs. Caesar (1999)	Asterix & Obelix: Mission Cleopatra (2002)	Asterix at the Olympic Games (2008)	Asterix & Obelix: The Middle Kingdom (2023)
Gauls
Asterix	Olaf Wijnants	David Coburn		Adam Rhys Dee
Obelix	Terry Jones	Dominic Fumusa		Cristian Solimeno
Druid Getafix	John Baddeley	Philip Proctor		Unknown
Chief Vitalstatistix	Douglas Blackwell			Unknown
Cacofonix	David Holt			Unknown
Impedimenta	Edita Brychta			Unknown
Unhygienix	Kerry Shale			Unknown
Geriatrix	David Graham			Unknown
Mrs. Geriatrix	Kate Harbour			
Fulliautomatix	David Cocker			Unknown
Panacea	Denise Rivera			Unknown
Romans
Julius Caesar	Peter Marinker	T. Scott Cunningham		Nicholas Boulton
Brutus	Dominic Borrelli			
Crismus Bonus	Rodney Beddal			
Egyptians
Edifis		Yul Vazquez		
Criminalis		Tom Wyner		
Queen Cleopatra		Diane Neal		Jessica Carroll
Pirates
Captain Bloody Beard		Bob Papenbrook		Unknown
Pegleg		Philip Proctor		
Crow's Nest Lookout		Stuart K. Robinson		Unknown
Other characters
Narrator		Erik Bergmann		Unknown
