= List of most expensive non-English-language films =

This is a non-definitive list of most expensive non-English-language films, with budgets given in United States dollars. Only films with budgets exceeding US$40 million are listed here.

Where the source gives the budget in the native currency, conversion is carried out using the exchange rates for the year of release as given by the Internal Revenue Service. In the absence of the exact year the closest year is used instead.

== List ==
List of most expensive non-English-language films
Title	Country	Primary language(s)	Year	Production costs (est.)
Ramayana: Part 1	India	Hindi	2026	$200,000,000–$250,000,000
The Battle at Lake Changjin	China	Mandarin	2021	$200,000,000
Monster Hunt 2	China	Mandarin	2018	$143,000,000
Detective Chinatown 3	China	Mandarin	2021	$117,000,000
Asterix at the Olympic Games	France	French	2008	$113,500,000
Asura	China	Mandarin	2018	$100,000,000
Ladybug & Cat Noir: The Movie	France	French	2023	$100,000,000
The Flowers of War	China	Mandarin, English, Japanese	2011	$94,000,000
The Rescue	China	Mandarin	2020	$90,000,000
The Monkey King 3	Hong Kong	Mandarin	2018	$87,300,000
Red Cliff	China	Mandarin	2008	$80,000,000
The Eight Hundred	China	Mandarin	2020	$80,000,000
Asterix and Obelix: God Save Britannia	France	French	2012	$78,000,000
Kalki 2898 AD	India	Telugu	2024	$75,000,000
Asterix & Obelix: The Middle Kingdom	France	French	2023	$72,400,000
RRR	India	Telugu	2022	$70,000,000
Dragon Blade	China	Mandarin, English, Latin, Turkic	2015	$65,000,000
Kung Fu Yoga	China, Hong Kong, India	Mandarin, English, Hindi	2017	$65,000,000
Air Strike	China	Mandarin, English	2018	$65,000,000
Society of the Snow	Spain	Spanish	2023	$65,000,000
Journey to the West: Conquering the Demons 2	China	Mandarin	2017	$64,000,000
Detective Chinatown 2	China	Mandarin	2018	$63,000,000
The Mermaid	China	Mandarin	2016	$60,700,000
Adipurush	India	Hindi, Telugu	2023	$60,500,000
Toxic	India	Kannada; English	2026	$60,000,000–$120,000,000
Mesrine	France	French, Spanish, English	2008	$60,000,000
The Monkey King	China, Hong Kong	Mandarin, Cantonese	2014	$60,000,000
The Monkey King 2	Hong Kong, China	Mandarin	2016	$60,000,000
Pushpa 2: The Rule	India	Telugu	2024	$59,700,000
Hi, Mom	China	Mandarin	2021	$58,900,000
2.0	India	Tamil	2018	$58,500,000–$83,300,000
Che	United States, France, Spain	Spanish, English	2008	$58,000,000
Shanghai Fortress	China	Mandarin	2021	$57,000,000
A Very Long Engagement	France	French	2004	$56,600,000
Monster Hunt	China	Mandarin	2015	$56,000,000
Brahmāstra: Part One – Shiva	India	Hindi	2022	$52,200,000
Railroad Tigers	China	Mandarin	2016	$50,000,000
The Wandering Earth	China	Mandarin	2019	$50,000,000
Okja	South Korea, United States	Korean, English	2017	$50,000,000
The Tale of the Princess Kaguya	Japan	Japanese	2013	$49,300,000
Viy 2: Journey to China	Russia, China	Russian, English	2019	$49,100,000
Gone with the Bullets	China	Mandarin	2014	$48,800,000
Sur la piste du Marsupilami	France	French	2012	$48,700,000
The Crossing	China	Mandarin, Japanese	2014	$48,600,000
Asterix & Obelix Take On Caesar	France	French	1999	$48,000,000
Asterix & Obelix: Mission Cleopatra	France	French	2002	$47,000,000
The Greatest of All Time	India	Tamil	2024	$47,800,000
Crimson Rivers II: Angels of the Apocalypse	France	French	2004	$46,400,000
The Extraordinary Adventures of Adèle Blanc-Sec	France	French	2010	$46,000,000
Hope	South Korea	Korean	2026	$46,000,000
Pinocchio	Italy	Italian	2002	$45,000,000
Curse of the Golden Flower	China	Mandarin	2006	$45,000,000
Gantz & Gantz: Perfect Answer	Japan	Japanese	2011	$45,000,000
Gladiators of Rome	Italy	Italian	2012	$45,000,000
Beauty and the Beast	France	French	2014	$45,000,000
Why I Did (Not) Eat My Father	France, Belgium, Italy	French	2014	$44,000,000
Asterix: The Land of the Gods	France	French	2014	$43,000,000
Saaho	India	Telugu, Hindi	2019	$42,600,000
Sye Raa Narasimha Reddy	India	Telugu	2019	$28,400,000–$42,600,000
Les Dalton	France	French, English	2004	$42,000,000
Singham Again	India	Hindi	2024	$41,800,000
Bounty Hunters	Hong Kong, China, South Korea	Mandarin, Korean	2016	$41,500,000
Supercondriaque	France	French	2014	$40,300,000
Antarctica	Japan	Japanese, English	1983	$40,000,000
The Promise	China	Mandarin	2005	$40,000,000
Apocalypto	United States	Yucatec Mayan	2006	$40,000,000
Nomad	United States, France, Russia, Kazakhstan	Russian, Kazakh	2007	$40,000,000
The Warlords	China, Hong Kong	Mandarin	2007	$40,000,000
Muhammad: The Messenger of God	Iran	Persian, Arabic, English	2015	$40,000,000

== See also ==
- List of highest-grossing non-English films
- List of most expensive films
- World cinema
