= List of 2012 box office number-one films in France =

This is a list of films which have placed number one at the weekly box office in France during 2012. The weeks start on Wednesdays, and finish on Tuesdays. The box-office number one is established in terms of tickets sold during the week.

== Number-one films ==
†	This implies the highest-grossing movie of the year.

#	Date	Film	Tickets sold	Box-office gross (weekend)	Notes
1	January 4, 2012	Intouchables †	687,681	US$4,532,890	
2	January 11, 2012	J. Edgar	627,624	US$4,402,714	J. Edgar broke the 10-week number-one streak of Intouchables.
3	January 18, 2012	The Girl with the Dragon Tattoo	477,509	US$3,246,603	
4	January 25, 2012	Sherlock Holmes: A Game of Shadows	981,375	US$7,261,137	
5	February 1, 2012	La Vérité si je mens ! 3	1,944,022	US$14,204,525	La vérité si je mens ! 3 made the lowest-grossing opening week for the franchise. Also noting that the movie was benefiting from the third widest release ever behind Asterix at the Olympic Games and Nothing to Declare.
6	February 8, 2012	La Vérité si je mens ! 3	1,059,930	US$7,394,263	
7	February 15, 2012	La Vérité si je mens ! 3	742,335	US$5,146,820	
8	February 22, 2012	Chronicle	458,842	US$3,157,205	
9	February 29, 2012	The Players	1,082,028	US$7,794,808	This movie, featuring Jean Dujardin, was released days after his Academy Award for Best Actor win. The Artist was second this week, and made the best 20th week of all-time following a wide re-release.
10	March 7, 2012	The Players	550,596	US$4,093,705	The Players beat John Carter, which was a box office bomb all around the world.
11	March 14, 2012	My Way	1,006,479	US$5,800,411	Project X had a much higher average of tickets sold per theater.
12	March 21, 2012	The Hunger Games	509,426	US$3,803,910	
13	March 28, 2012	Big is Beautiful	365,886	US$2,509,729	Big is Beautiful sold more tickets than Wrath of the Titans but the latter had a higher gross due to 3D.
14	April 4, 2012	Houba! On the Trail of the Marsupilami	1,728,270	US$10,594,491	Sur la piste du Marsupilami was directed by Alain Chabat, starring himself and Jamel Debbouze, which were already reunited ten years prior in Asterix & Obelix: Mission Cleopatra, which was an incredible success at the French box-office, totalling over 14.5 million tickets sold.
15	April 11, 2012	Houba! On the Trail of the Marsupilami	1,288,098	US$8,661,750	
16	April 18, 2012	Houba! On the Trail of the Marsupilami	1,015,296	US$6,854,672	
17	April 25, 2012	The Avengers	2,041,362	US$19,035,088	The Avengers sold more tickets in one week, than every other Marvel movie in their entire theatrical run (except Iron Man 2).
18	May 2, 2012	The Avengers	1,101,255	US$6,911,388	
19	May 9, 2012	Dark Shadows	676,890	US$4,891,523	
20	May 16, 2012	Rust and Bone	651,578	US$4,450,393	Rust and Bone released on Thursday, but managed to beat other releases in tickets. Dark Shadows had more gross.
21	May 23, 2012	Men in Black 3	802,879	US$6,120,494	The third episode has the lowest number of tickets sold in the trilogy.
22	May 30, 2012	Prometheus	812,356	US$6,680,431	
23	June 6, 2012	Madagascar 3: Europe's Most Wanted	1,087,767	US$9,025,832	The opening week was stronger than the first Madagascar film, but slightly lower than Madagascar: Escape 2 Africa.
24	June 13, 2012	Snow White and the Huntsman	706,260	US$4,784,715	Madagascar 3: Europe's Most Wanted had a slightly higher revenue.
25	June 20, 2012	Snow White and the Huntsman	512,764	US$2,759,221	Madagascar 3: Europe's Most Wanted had a slightly higher revenue.
26	June 27, 2012	Ice Age: Continental Drift	1,767,490	US$12,763,644	
27	July 4, 2012	Ice Age: Continental Drift	1,397,190	US$9,456,081	
28	July 11, 2012	Ice Age: Continental Drift	1,066,947	US$7,555,672	
29	July 18, 2012	Ice Age: Continental Drift	547,843	US$3,839,833	
30	July 25, 2012	The Dark Knight Rises	1,835,547	US$11,924,079	
31	August 1, 2012	Brave	955,285	US$6,496,657	
32	August 8, 2012	Brave	490,863	US$2,874,036	
33	August 15, 2012	Total Recall	551,476	US$3,188,027	The Dark Knight Rises (3,653,657) surpassed the box office total of The Dark Knight (3,036,568)
34	August 22, 2012	The Expendables 2	935,219	US$6,078,277	The Expendables had begun in 773,121 tickets sold in the first week, for a box office total of 1,651,610.
35	August 29, 2012	The Expendables 2	500,906	US$3,318,314	
36	September 5, 2012	The Expendables 2	219,085	US$1,499,369	
37	September 12, 2012	Camille Rewinds	244,443	US$1,570,109	
38	September 19, 2012	The Bourne Legacy	485,799	US$3,413,087	
39	September 26, 2012	The Dream Team	1,088,676	US$7,962,372	
40	October 3, 2012	Taken 2	1,231,066	US$8,785,095	Taken had begun in 291,494 tickets sold in the first week, for a box office total of 1,018,518.
41	October 10, 2012	Taken 2	717,111	US$5,272,141	Ted (418,035) and In the House (403,162) in their first week.
42	October 17, 2012	Asterix & Obelix: God Save Britannia	1,132,279	US$9,267,980	
43	October 24, 2012	Skyfall	1,839,220	US$10,506,171	Opened on Friday.
44	October 31, 2012	Skyfall	2,186,661	US$15,267,955	
45	November 7, 2012	Skyfall	1,136,474	US$8,495,114	
46	November 14, 2012	The Twilight Saga: Breaking Dawn – Part 2	2,409,923	US$17,889,239	The Twilight Saga: Breaking Dawn – Part 1 had begun in 2,018,771 tickets sold in the first week.
47	November 21, 2012	The Twilight Saga: Breaking Dawn – Part 2	1,029,989	US$7,696,731	
48	November 28, 2012	Rise of the Guardians	571,590	US$4,778,895	
49	December 5, 2012	Rise of the Guardians	402,279	US$3,324,405	
50	December 12, 2012	The Hobbit: An Unexpected Journey	1,434,119	US$11,122,466	
51	December 19, 2012	The Hobbit: An Unexpected Journey	900,000	US$8,224,020	
52	December 26, 2012	The Hobbit: An Unexpected Journey	1,109,453	US$10,137,960	

== See also ==
- Lists of highest-grossing films in France
- List of French films of 2012
