= Asterix at the Olympic Games (video game) =

2007 video game

- Developer: Étranges Libellules
- Publisher: Atari
- Director: Marc Dutriez
- Designer: Marc Dutriez
- Composer: Fabrice Bouillon-LaForest
- Platforms: Microsoft Windows, Wii, PlayStation 2, Nintendo DS, Xbox 360
- Release: Microsoft Windows, PlayStation 2, Wii, Nintendo DS: EU: 9 November 2007; UK: 29 February 2008; Xbox 360: EU: 22 August 2008
- Genres: Sports, platform, adventure, action
- Modes: Single-player, multiplayer

Asterix at the Olympic Games (French: Astérix aux Jeux olympiques) is an adventure sports video game for the Wii, Xbox 360, PlayStation 2, Microsoft Windows and Nintendo DS, developed by Étranges Libellules and published by Atari. It is loosely based on the comic of the same name and mostly based on the live action film. It was released in Europe in November 2007 for the Windows, Wii, PlayStation 2 and Nintendo DS, followed by the UK release in February 2008. The game was also released on Xbox 360 in 2008.

== Plot ==
Astérix and Obélix have to win the Olympic Games in order to help their lovesick friend Lovestorix marry Princess Irina. Brutus uses every trick in the book to have his own team win the game, and get rid of his father Julius Caesar in the process.

== Gameplay ==
While letting the players to switch control between both Asterix and Obelix anytime, the action is split between platforming in 3D through the city and competing in challenges to unlock new areas. Players can throw the javelin and hammer, participate in the long jump, running events, and various other Olympic events (in Wii's case, by using the controller). Besides the main Story mode, there is also the Antique mode, which gives a freedom of selecting any Olympic event and playing it right away.

== Reception ==
Nintendo Life was positive about the Wii version, giving it a 7/10 and compared the game to Mario & Sonic at the Olympic Games, praising the game for its originality, graphics, theme and controls, but criticized some of the minigames, calling some of them simple and strange, as well as criticizing the multiplayer for being boring. GamesRadar+ however, was mixed about the game, comparing it to Lego Star Wars games for its multiplayer gameplay being similar. They called it "an odd mix of platforming and sports minigames" and criticized it for its gameplay, calling the genre overused and no longer needed.
