= Mission Cleopatra (song) =

Single by Snoop Dogg and Jamel Debbouze

from the album Asterix & Obelix: Mission Cleopatra soundtrack
- Released: April 2002
- Genre: Hip hop
- Length: 3:51
- Label: Doggystyle; Priority; Capitol
- Songwriter(s): Calvin Broadus; Jamel Debbouze
- Producer(s): Daz Dillinger

Snoop Dogg singles chronology
"The Wash" (2002)	"Mission Cleopatra" (2002)	"Undercova Funk (Give Up the Funk)" (2002)

"Mission Cleopatra" is a song by American rapper Snoop Dogg and French comedian Jamel Debbouze. It was released in April 2002 as the single for the soundtrack to the 2002 film Asterix & Obelix: Mission Cleopatra with the record labels Doggystyle Records, Priority Records and Capitol Records.

== Track listing ==
- CD single
1. "Mission Cleopatra" (with Jamel Debbouze) — 3:51
2. "Mission Cleopatra" (Instrumental) — 3:52

== Chart performance ==
=== Weekly charts ===
Chart (2002)	Peak position
France (SNEP)	8

== Certifications ==
Region	Certification	Certified units/sales
France (SNEP)	Gold	250,000^{*}
^{*} Sales figures based on certification alone.
