= Asterix and Obelix: God Save Britannia =

- French theatrical release poster
- Astérix & Obélix : Au service de Sa Majesté
- Directed by: Laurent Tirard
- Screenplay by: Laurent Tirard; Gregoire Vigneron
- Based on: Asterix in Britain; Asterix and the Normans by Albert Uderzo; René Goscinny
- Produced by: Olivier Delbosc; Marc Missonnier
- Starring: Édouard Baer; Gérard Depardieu; Fabrice Luchini; Catherine Deneuve
- Cinematography: Laurent Tirard
- Edited by: Valérie Deseine
- Music by: Klaus Badelt
- Production company: Fidélité Films
- Distributed by: Wild Bunch
- Release date: October 17, 2012
- Running time: 110 minutes
- Countries: France; Italy; Spain; Hungary
- Language: French
- Budget: $78,000,000
- Box office: $61,319,383

Asterix and Obelix: God Save Britannia (French: Astérix & Obélix : Au service de Sa Majesté) is a 2012 French fantasy comedy live-action adaptation of the Asterix comic book series, directed by Laurent Tirard, and is the sequel to Asterix at the Olympic Games (2008), and is the fourth installment in the Asterix film series after Asterix and Obelix vs. Caesar (1999), Asterix & Obelix: Mission Cleopatra (2002), and Asterix at the Olympic Games (2008).

It was released in 3D and premiered at the Dinard Festival of British Cinema to negative reviews. It is a live-action film from Fidélité Films and is based on Asterix in Britain (1965) and Asterix and the Normans (1966). Gérard Depardieu plays the role of Obelix for the fourth and last time, while the Asterix role is taken over by Édouard Baer.

This is the only live action Asterix film where the Getafix character doesn't appear on screen, despite official plot descriptions mentioning him indirectly; he is mentioned only once by Vitalstatistix.

== Plot ==
Julius Caesar lands in Britain, where a small village still holds out bravely against the Roman legions. But the situation becomes critical and the villagers have not got long to live. Anticlimax, one of the villagers, seeks volunteers to go seek help from his second-cousin Asterix the Gaul and bring back a barrel of "magic potion" from the Breton village of the indomitable heroes.

== Cast ==
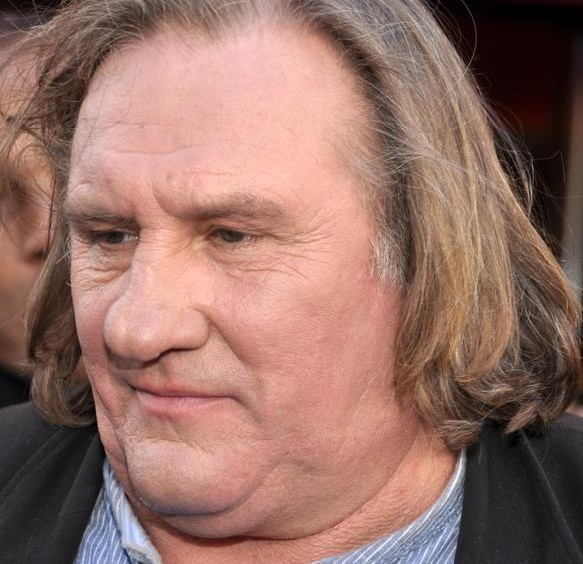
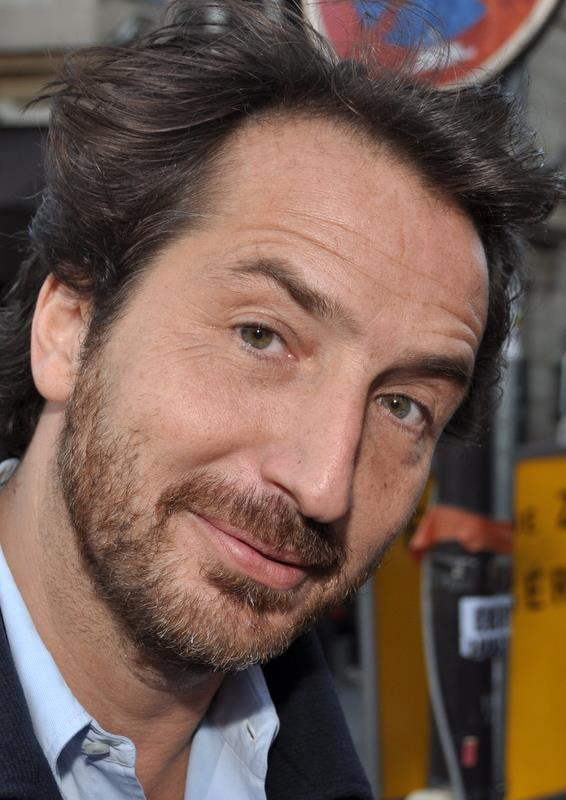
Gérard Depardieu and Édouard Baer at the film's premiere in Paris, September 2012.
- Édouard Baer as Asterix
- Gérard Depardieu as Obelix
- Fabrice Luchini as Julius Caesar
- Catherine Deneuve as the Queen Cordelia
- Gérard Jugnot as Redbeard
- Valérie Lemercier as Miss Macintosh
- Guillaume Gallienne as Anticlimax
- Charlotte Le Bon as Ophelia, Anticlimax's fiancée
- Vincent Lacoste as Justforkix
- Dany Boon as Tetedepiaf
- Bouli Lanners as Olaf Timandahaf
- Atmen Kelif as Pindépis
- Niccolò Senni as Megacursus
- Jean Rochefort as Senator Lucius Fouinus
- Michel Duchaussoy as Vitalstatistix
- Tristán Ulloa as Claudius Lapsus
- Vincent Moscato as Pilliébax
- Javivi as executioner
- Ginnie Watson as a Breton
- Filippo Timi as a decurion
- Neri Marcorè as a decurion

== See also ==
- Asterix films (live action)
