= Asterix & Obelix: The Middle Kingdom =

2023 French film in the Asterix & Obelix series

- French theatrical release poster
- French: Astérix et Obélix : L'Empire du Milieu
- Directed by: Guillaume Canet
- Written by: Guillaume Canet; Philippe Mechelen; Julien Hervé
- Based on: Asterix by René Goscinny; Albert Uderzo
- Produced by: Alain Attal; Yohan Baiada
- Starring: Guillaume Canet; Gilles Lellouche; Vincent Cassel; Jonathan Cohen; Marion Cotillard
- Cinematography: André Chemetoff
- Edited by: Simon Jacquet
- Music by: Matthieu Chedid
- Production companies: Pathé Films; TF1 Films Production; Les Editions Albert René; Les Enfants Terribles; Les Productions des Trésor
- Distributed by: Pathé Distribution
- Release date: February 1, 2023
- Running time: 111 minutes
- Country: France
- Language: French
- Budget: $72.4 million
- Box office: $46.5 million

Asterix & Obelix: The Middle Kingdom (French: Astérix et Obélix : L'Empire du Milieu) is a 2023 French live-action adventure comedy film directed and co-written by Guillaume Canet, who also stars as Asterix. It is the fifth installment in the Asterix live-action film series.

The film, which co-stars Gilles Lellouche as Obelix, sees the title heroes travel to Han-era China for the first time. The original story is based on a script by Philippe Mechelen and Julien Hervé. Canet also collaborated on the script. It is the first live-action Asterix film not based on any of the comic albums or starring Gérard Depardieu as Obelix.

Shooting was originally planned to take place in 2020 in China but was delayed for a year and relocated to France due to the COVID-19 pandemic. Budgeted at $72.4 million, the film is co-produced by Pathé, Les Enfants Terribles and Paris-based Tresor Films. It was theatrically released in France on 1 February 2023, and on Netflix in select regions on 19 May 2023. The film received negative reviews from critics. While it was number one at the French box office in 2023, selling over 4,6 million admissions, its success was insufficient to recoup the colossal budget; it eventually grossed $46 million worldwide against a budget of $72 million, making it a box-office bomb.

== Plot ==
It is 50 BC and Gaul is entirely occupied by Rome, except for one little Gaulish village giving the Roman Legionnaires a tough time. Four Roman camps surround the village yet are still unable to conquer it. Asterix is worried about the long-term health impact of using the magic potion excessively, but he knows that the Gauls cannot fight the Romans without it. The village has Unhygienix (Jason Chicandier) the fish monger, Cacofonix (Philippe Katerine) the village bard, Vitalstatistix (Jérôme Commandeur) the village chief, Getafix (Pierre Richard) the druid, Panacea (Angèle) the damsel and so on.

Meanwhile, Princess Fu Yi, the only daughter of the Chinese Emperor Han Xuandi (91–48 BC), escapes from a rogue prince, Deng Tsin Qin, travels to Gaul with Graindemais (Jonathan Cohen) the coach driver and her bodyguard Tat Han (Leanna Chea). Asterix has a crush on Fu Yi, while Obelix has also a crush on Panacea.

Fu Yi says that her mother The Empress of China (Linh-Dan Pham) struggled to keep control of the Kingdom after the Emperor's death. The princes covet the throne and pose a threat to Fu Yi's life. Prince Deng Tsin Qin defies the empress and levy's a new tax on his part of the Kingdom. Ri Qi Qi (Manu Payet) is Deng's top advisor. Deng wants to marry Fu Yi, but Fu Yi laughs at the suggestion.

The Empress senses danger to Fu Yi's life and seeks help from Epidemais (Ramzy Bedia) who is a western trader in China and claims to be from Gaul. Graindemais is Epidemais's nephew. As Deng attacks, The Empress asks Epidemais to take Fu Yi to Gaul and away from China. Epidemais entrusts Graindemais to complete the task. The Empress refuses to abandon her country and is captured by Deng, along with Epidemais. Vitalstatistix refuses to help as China is too far away and he finds Fu Yi's story incredulous. Asterix offers to go with Fu Yi to help her and her mother and Obelix decides to accompany him.

Meanwhile, Julius Caesar is in Rome with Cleopatra (Marion Cotillard). Cleopatra says that she is sick for Julius and will leave him for Tabascos (Florent Manaudou). Ri Qi Qi reaches Caesar's court and offers the riches of China, in exchange for military help. Cleopatra chides Caesar that outside of Rome, nobody knows him. Caesar is livid and decides to go to China and make a name for himself there. Julius Caesar (Vincent Cassel) takes his army regiments to China to defend Deng Tsin Qin. Caesar and his army get stuck on the silk road.

Meanwhile, Asterix, Obelix, Tat Han, Fu Yi and Graindemais travel to North Africa by rowing across the Mediterranean. Graindemais tells Asterix that he loves Fu Yi and is going to marry her. They both start fighting on account of winning the affections of Fu Yi. The gang travels via the Egyptian desert to reach to the ancient town of Klysma, or modern Suez. At the town, they hire a boatman named Titanix to take them to China. Fu Yi sees the magic of the potion herself when Asterix and Obelix fight a few ruffians in the Suez tavern.

The gang comes across the boat of Pirate Asymetrix. This time Tat Han asks Asterix to step back and let her do the fighting. Tat Han defeats the pirates all by herself and sinks their boat. Obelix falls in love with Tat Han. Meanwhile, Caesar's army finds its way through Persia, the Indian mountains and Mongolia to reach at the doorstep of China. Caesar meets Deng and creates a strategy to conquer China.

Caesar uses his mighty warrior Caius Antivirus (Zlatan Ibrahimovic) to attack and subdue the Kingdoms opposing Deng. 4 Kingdoms are defeated and the last one standing is the Ku Koo clan. Fu Yi and her entourage reach China. Asterix tells Obelix that after the adventure he and Fu Yi will stay together in the village and he wants Obelix to move out of the hut as it belongs to Asterix's father, and hence to Asterix. Obelix says that he is happy to move out as he loves Tat Han. Asterix laughs at the suggestion, and they begin to fight. It is announced that Deng and Caesar will decapitate the Empress in 7 days.

Fu Yi and her entourage stays at the residence of Tat Han's master Ban Han. Ban says that the Empress has been held captive at the abandoned Xuan temple. Ban says that after rescuing the Empress, the group has to go to the Ku Koo Kingdom before Caesar is able to defeat it. Crown Prince Du Deng (Tran Vu Tran) is rumored to be so ugly that he keeps his face covered in bamboo.

Tat Han rescues the Empress and the entourage escapes. Epidemais decides to stay back and face the negotiation with his captors for his life. Fu Yi is sent with Asterix and Obelix to secure the Ku Koo support. While The Empress and Tat Han leave to gather their own supporters and build their army. Because of Obelix's superhuman speed, the trio beat Caesar's legions to Ku Koo's palace. Far from being hideous, Prince Du Deng is handsome and glorious, with blonde hair. Fu Yi is smitten with Prince Du Deng.

Fu Yi and Du Deng have an army of 10,000, against Caesar's 80,000 soldiers. Asterix shares his potion with Fu Yi and Du Deng. But in the middle of battle, Asterix's flask is pierced by an arrow, and he runs out of the potion. Obelix defends Asterix from any attacks from Romans. Despite their best-efforts Fu Yi is captured by the Romans. This is when The Empress enters the battlefield with her massive army. The whole of China came to defend their land. The Romans surrendered on the spot. Caesar is forced to retreat.

The Empress travels to Gaul to give her thanks to the villagers of Gaul. Du Deng marries Fu Yi. Obelix dumps Panacea for Tat Han. They have a great party together. But Tat Han returns to China with The Empress and Fu Yi.

== Cast ==
| Character | Original actor | English voice |
|---|---|---|
| Asterix | Guillaume Canet | Adam Rhys Dee |
| Obelix | Gilles Lellouche | Cristian Solimeno |
| Julius Caesar | Vincent Cassel | Nicholas Boulton |
| Bankruptis | Jonathan Cohen | Joe Da Costa |
| Cleopatra | Marion Cotillard | Jessica Carroll |
| Princess Sa See | Julie Chen | Alice Hewkim |
| Ka Ra Tay | Leanna Chea | Elizabeth Chan |
| Biopix | José Garcia | Luis Soto |
| Scar Dee Kat | Manu Payet | James Goode |
| Ekonomikrisis | Ramzy Bedia | Peter Polycarpou |
| Deng Tsin Quin | Bun Hay Mean | Wayne Forrester |
| Empress of China | Linh-Dan Pham | Linh-Dan Pham |

=== Additional actors ===
- Original actor: Tran Vu Tran (Prince Du Deng), Jason Chicandier (Unhygienix), Philippe Katerine (Cacofonix), Jérôme Commandeur (Vitalstatistix), Audrey Lamy (Impedimenta), Franck Gastambide (Captain Redbeard), Vincent Desagnat (Perfidus), Pierre Richard (Getafix), Zlatan Ibrahimović (Antivirus), Gérard Darmon (Narrator), Angèle (Panacea), Matthieu Chedid (Remix), Florent Manaudou (Tabascos)

=== Additional Voices ===
- English voice: Rick May (Soldier), Andy Whipp, Babette Barat, Ben Crowe, Christopher Fairbanks, Sean Barrett, James Hillier, Zlatan Ibrahimović, Jane Collingwood, Jon Glover, Martin Sarreal, Nigel Pilkington, Qiang Wu, James Goode, Stephen Hogan

== Production ==
In 2016, after mixed critical and commercial success of the two previous live-action Asterix films, Asterix at the Olympic Games (2008) and Asterix and Obelix: God Save Britannia (2012), Anne Goscinny, the daughter of Asterix creator René Goscinny, declared the series required a reboot in terms of ideas and casting. Directors considered included Michel Hazanavicius and Franck Gastambide with a proposal to make a film based on Asterix in Corsica.

In November 2017, Le Film Français magazine revealed that Éditions Albert René, producers Alain Attal and Yohan Baiada would be making a new live-action feature film not based on an Asterix comic album and that the Gauls would venture to China, with shooting scheduled for 2020.

In October 2019, Guillaume Canet announced he would be directing the film and taking on the role of Asterix, while Gilles Lellouche would co-star as Obelix. In previous live action films of Asterix, the role of Obelix had had always been played by Gérard Depardieu, who was Asterix co-creator Albert Uderzo's preferred actor for the part. Responding to the casting of Gilles Lellouche as Obelix, Depardieu said he was not disappointed as he does not have a monopoly on the role.

Alain Attal of Tresor Films said he and Canet had visited China with French President Emmanuel Macron to present the project to Chinese authorities and be permitted to film in China, co-produce with a Chinese firm, and release the film there. Attal also said Pathé was in negotiations with a Chinese distribution and co-production partner, which would cover part of the budget. Pathé is to distribute the film in France and represent it in international markets. The film's original working title in English was Asterix and Obelix: The Silk Road.

On 18 February 2020, production was halted due to the COVID-19 pandemic. In December 2020, Lellouche said filming would not take place in China, mainly because of political reasons.

In March 2021, French media reported shooting would take place in the Guéry plateau area of Puy-de-Dôme. Casting of extras took place over March 8 to 11 in Clermont-Ferrand and on March 12 in La Bourboule, for dozens of athletic men of Asian origin, aged between 18 and 45. Casting also sought Caucasian males, aged between 18 and 25, also of athletic build or having served in the army, with a height between 1.76 and 1.83 meters. Filming commenced on 12 April 2021 at Bry-sur-Marne studios. Shooting also took place in Brétigny-sur-Orge and Morocco. On 6 August 2021, Canet announced that shooting had completed after 17 weeks.

== Soundtrack ==
- "Say You, Say Me" – Lionel Richie
- "We Will Rock You (Antivirus)" – Queen & Roman Soldiers
- "Kung Fu Fighting" – Cee Lo Green and Jack Black
- "Deborah's Theme" (From Once Upon a Time in America) – Ennio Morricone
- "(I've Had) The Time of My Life" – Julie Chen & Tran Vu Tran

== Reception ==
Asterix & Obelix: The Middle Kingdom has an approval rating of 44% on review aggregator website Rotten Tomatoes, based on 9 reviews, and an average rating of 5/10.

== See also ==
- Asterix films (live action)
