= Undercova Funk (Give Up the Funk) =

Single by Snoop Dogg featuring Mr. Kane, Bootsy Collins, Quaze and Fred Wesley

from the album Undercover Brother
- Released: May 2002
- Genre: Hip hop; funk
- Length: 3:24
- Label: Hollywood
- Songwriters: Bootsy Collins; Calvin Broadus; George Clinton; Jerome Brailey

Snoop Dogg singles chronology
| "Mission Cleopatra" (2002) | "Undercova Funk (Give Up the Funk)" (2002) | "The Streets" (2002) |

"Undercova Funk (Give Up the Funk)" is a song by American rapper Snoop Dogg featuring Mr. Kane, Bootsy Collins, Quaze and Fred Wesley. It was released in May 2002 as the single for the soundtrack to the 2002 film Undercover Brother on the record label Hollywood Records. The song samples "Give Up the Funk (Tear the Roof off the Sucker)" by Parliament, which Bootsy Collins was a part of. The music video was directed by Gregory Dark and features Eddie Griffin, Denise Richards, Neil Patrick Harris and Aunjanue Ellis, all of whom appear in the film.

== Track listing ==
- CD single
1. "Undercova Funk (Give Up The Funk)" (Radio Edit) (featuring Mr. Kane, Bootsy Collins, Quaze and Fred Wesley) — 4:01
2. "Undercova Funk (Give Up The Funk)" (Album Version) (featuring Mr. Kane, Bootsy Collins, Quaze and Fred Wesley) — 3:24

== Chart performance ==
=== Weekly charts ===
| Chart (2002) | Peak position |
|---|---|
| Finland (Suomen virallinen lista) | 17 |
| Switzerland (Schweizer Hitparade) | 77 |
