= Undercover Brother =

2002 film by Malcolm D. Lee

- Theatrical release poster
- Directed by: Malcolm D. Lee
- Screenplay by: John Ridley; Michael McCullers
- Story by: John Ridley
- Based on: Undercover Brother by John Ridley
- Produced by: Brian Grazer; Michael Jenkinson; Damon Lee
- Starring: Eddie Griffin; Chris Kattan; Denise Richards; Dave Chappelle; Aunjanue Ellis; Neil Patrick Harris; Chi McBride; Billy Dee Williams
- Cinematography: Tom Priestley Jr.
- Edited by: William Kerr
- Music by: Stanley Clarke
- Production companies: Universal Pictures; Imagine Entertainment
- Distributed by: Universal Pictures
- Release date: May 31, 2002
- Running time: 86 minutes
- Country: United States
- Language: English
- Budget: $25 million
- Box office: $41.6 million

Undercover Brother is a 2002 American satirical spy action comedy blaxploitation film directed by Malcolm D. Lee and starring Eddie Griffin. The screenplay by John Ridley and Michael McCullers is based on the Internet animated series created by Ridley. It spoofs blaxploitation films of the 1970s as well as a number of other films, most notably the James Bond franchise. The film also stars former Saturday Night Live cast member Chris Kattan and comedian Dave Chappelle as well as Aunjanue Ellis, Neil Patrick Harris, Denise Richards, and Billy Dee Williams, and features a cameo by James Brown.

Undercover Brother was released by Universal Pictures on May 31, 2002. The film received positive reviews from critics and grossed $41.6 million against a $25 million budget.

== Plot ==
The film begins with a backstory of how African-American culture's popularity with the American public began to decline in the 1980s, when style and originality began to lose appeal in the public eye due to the persistent efforts of "The Man", a powerful Caucasian man in control of a secret organization that seeks to undermine the African-American community as well as the cultures of other minorities. The Man is infuriated that Gen. Warren Boutwell, a United States Army general (based on Colin Powell), is considering running for president, and his lackey Mr. Feather informs him of a mind-control drug which The Man uses to make Boutwell abort his plans and instead open a fried chicken franchise. The B.R.O.T.H.E.R.H.O.O.D., a secret organization that battles The Man's influence, determines The Man is behind Boutwell's change of heart, and recruits a freelance spy named Undercover Brother to aid them.

Undercover Brother joins B.R.O.T.H.E.R.H.O.O.D.'s leadership, made up of the Chief, Conspiracy Brother, Smart Brother and Sistah Girl. Also tagging along is Lance, an intern who is the only white man in the organization hired due to affirmative action. Undercover Brother goes undercover as a new employee at a cigarette company owned by The Man, where Mr. Feather discovers his identity. He deploys a secret weapon that he calls "Black Man's Kryptonite", an attractive assassin named White She-Devil. Posing as another new employee, she and Undercover Brother start dating, and she begins to make him do stereotypical "white" things, such as buying corduroy and khaki clothes, singing karaoke, and adopting a silly set of euphemisms. Meanwhile, The Man distributes his mind-control drug through Boutwell's fried chicken, infecting other black celebrities and making them act white, as well as marketing the chicken nationwide to land a crushing blow to African-American culture.

Concerned with Undercover Brother's unusual behavior, Sistah Girl attacks White She-Devil while Undercover Brother fights the henchmen as White She-Devil and Sistah girl start to tear each other's clothes off and end up in the shower where they start to rub themselves before rubbing up against each other and almost kissing. Sistah Girl then convinces Undercover Brother to return to the fight. White She-Devil turns on her own henchmen to save the two, revealing she has fallen in love with Undercover Brother. They return to the B.R.O.T.H.E.R.H.O.O.D., where Smart Brother questions White She-Devil about The Man and Lance is officially made part of the group when he declares his desire to abolish bigotry after watching Roots. The group heads to an awards gala after they find out that James Brown is The Man's next target. Mr. Feather kidnaps Brown and takes him to The Man's base. B.R.O.T.H.E.R.H.O.O.D. secures an antidote for the mind control drug and follows via a transmitter placed on Brown, infiltrating the base posing as a cleaning crew, to rescue Brown and Boutwell.

Mr. Feather prepares to administer the drug to Brown and present him as a trophy to The Man, and Brown reveals himself as Undercover Brother in disguise. Mr. Feather sends his henchmen after B.R.O.T.H.E.R.H.O.O.D., who rescue Boutwell, and is ordered by Mr. Feather to kill Undercover Brother. In the fighting, Conspiracy Brother accidentally begins the building's self-destruct sequence. The B.R.O.T.H.E.R.H.O.O.D. cures Boutwell and evacuate him from the building while Undercover Brother chases Mr. Feather to the roof. The Man's helicopter circles overhead and leaves, The Man abandoning Mr. Feather for failing him. Mr. Feather jumps onto the helicopter's landing gear as it flies away, and Undercover Brother uses his afro picks to impale Mr. Feather in the buttocks, causing him to fall into the ocean, where he is eaten by a shark. However, The Man escapes. Undercover Brother survives the building's self-destruction by leaping off the building and using his modified parachute pants to escape. All three of them leave the island, the world at peace.

== Cast ==
- Eddie Griffin as "Undercover Brother" / Anton Jackson
- Chris Kattan as Mr. Feather
- Denise Richards as "White She-Devil" / Penelope Snow
- Aunjanue Ellis as "Sistah Girl"
- Dave Chappelle as Conspiracy Brother Jones
- Chi McBride as The Chief
- Neil Patrick Harris as Lance, The Intern
- Gary Anthony Williams as "Smart Brother"
- Billy Dee Williams as General Warren Boutwell
- Jack Noseworthy as Mr. Elias
- J.D. Hall as The Narrator
- James Brown as Himself
- Robert Trumbull as "The Man"
- Robert Townsend as Mr. U.B.
- Jim Kelly as Himself (deleted scene)

== Filming locations ==
The R. C. Harris Water Treatment Plant in Toronto served as the headquarters for "The Man".

== Music ==
"Undercova Funk (Give Up the Funk)" by Snoop Dogg featuring Bootsy Collins was released as a single from the film's soundtrack album on Hollywood Records, sampling "Give Up the Funk (Tear the Roof off the Sucker)" by Parliament, from the album Mothership Connection, which was also featured in the film. A music video for "Undercover Funk" was also produced, featuring appearances from Eddie Griffin, Bootsy Collins and Buckethead.

== Reception ==
=== Box office ===
Undercover Brother made $12.1 million during its opening weekend, ranking in fourth place at the box office, behind The Sum of All Fears, Star Wars: Episode II – Attack of the Clones and Spider-Man.

=== Critical response ===
On Rotten Tomatoes, the film holds an approval rating of 78% based on 130 reviews, with an average rating of 6.8/10. The website's critics consensus reads, "Fast-paced and filled with racial gags, Undercover Brother serves up plenty of laughs and sharp satire." On Metacritic, the film received a weighted average score of 69 out of 100, based on 30 critics, indicating "generally favorable reviews".

Mick LaSalle of the San Francisco Chronicle gave a positive review, stating: "The picture is crammed with shameless satire, engaging moments of pure silliness and jokes that border on the outrageous. It combines relentless energy with an aura of good nature for a formula that works." On the other hand, Peter Bradshaw from The Guardian commented "It's the sort of movie that needs a cracking joke in every frame and every line, if the flimsy premise is to stay upright. Sadly, this just doesn't." Yet, for New York Times' film critic A. O. Scott, this light humor "may be taken as a hopeful sign, suggesting that it is now possible to acknowledge that the past few decades of American racial melodrama have been, at bottom, pretty silly." Marc Savlov of The Austin Chronicle also conveys this enthusiasm for post-blaxploitation humor: "it tackles the blaxploitation films of the Seventies with enough good-humored gusto to pull this one off somehow, [thanks to a] script that takes color-blind potshots at everything black, white, and all shades of gray". Owen Gleiberman of Entertainment Weekly identified one risky joke in the script, "the movie's completely hyperbolic and uncharitable — and very funny — tweak of Colin Powell [...] you can feel the glee with which the director, Malcolm D. Lee, skewers the image of a respectable black man bending his will to the white world."

Beyond the debated solidity of the movie's humor, Jan Stuart of the Los Angeles Times takes the racial analysis a step further: "this is broad movie spoofing with a point: using the racial divisions and stereotypes manipulated by the Shaft-Super Fly genre to show how whites came around over the intervening decades to embracing their inner blackness. And how ambivalently many blacks feel about that in return."

== Home media ==
Undercover Brother was released on DVD and VHS on January 14, 2003. A Blu-ray version was released on August 13, 2019.

== Sequel ==
A sequel titled Undercover Brother 2 starring Michael Jai White, Gary Owen, Affion Crockett, and Brandon Hirsch was released on Netflix and directly to video in 2019.

== Awards ==
- Black Reel - Best Film Song for "Undercova Brother (We Got the Funk)"
- Washington DC Area Film Critics Association Awards - Best Guilty Pleasure
