= Asterix and the Laurel Wreath =

Comic book album

Asterix and the Laurel Wreath (Les Lauriers de César)
- Date: 1974
- Series: Asterix

Creative team
- Writers: René Goscinny
- Artists: Albert Uderzo

Original publication
- Date of publication: 1971
- Language: French

Chronology
- Preceded by: The Mansions of the Gods
- Followed by: Asterix and the Soothsayer

Asterix and the Laurel Wreath (French: Les Lauriers de César, "Caesar's Laurels") is the eighteenth volume of the Asterix comic book series, by René Goscinny (stories) and Albert Uderzo (illustrations). It was originally serialized in the magazine Pilote, issues 621–642, in 1971 and translated into English in 1974.

== Plot summary ==
The story begins in Rome where Asterix and Obelix are talking, but flashes back to Lutetia, where Asterix, Obelix, Chief Vitalstatistix, and the chief's wife Impedimenta visit Impedimenta's brother, Homeopathix, a rich businessman who immediately shows off his wealth. At dinner, Vitalstatistix quickly becomes drunk and boasts that, as a Chief, he can obtain for Homeopathix something money cannot possibly buy, a stew seasoned with Julius Caesar's laurel wreath, whereupon the equally drunk Obelix volunteers himself and Asterix to fetch the wreath.

In Rome, Asterix and Obelix see a man coming out of Caesar's palace. Upon discovering that he is a kitchen slave there, they offer themselves to the slave trader Typhus, who supplies Caesar's palace. When Typhus' other slaves provoke the Gauls into a fight, the wealthy patrician, Osseus Humerus, is amused and offers to buy them; Asterix mistakes him for Caesar's major-domo and completes the sale. The Gauls are placed under the supervision of Goldendelicius, Humerus' chief slave. Goldendelicius expresses dislike of the two Gauls because they come from Typhus (a mark of distinction among slaves) and fears that they might usurp his office.

Realizing their mistake, Asterix and Obelix attempt to get Humerus to return them to Typhus. First, they cook a volatile stew, which accidentally cures Humerus' heavy-drinking son Metatarsus of his constant hangovers. Next they disturb the sleeping family by making noise, which only inspires the family to throw an impromptu party. The next day, a tired Humerus sends the Gauls to Caesar's palace to justify his absence to a secretary there. Goldendelicius seizes the opportunity to tell the palace's guards that the Gauls intend to kill Caesar. As a result, Asterix and Obelix are thrown into the palace prison upon arrival, but they escape during the night and unsuccessfully search the palace for the laurel wreath. At daybreak, they return to their cell (to the confusion of the palace guards) and decide to find Caesar and seize the wreath from him.

The next morning, a lawyer comes to defend Asterix and Obelix in a show trial for the "attempt" on Caesar's life. The lawyer takes for granted that they will be found guilty and thrown to the lions in the Circus Maximus. Asterix is encouraged when the lawyer says Caesar might attend the execution. During the trial, the prosecutor announces the same initial speech intended by the defense lawyer, prompting the latter to call for a suspension in proceedings. Anxious to be sentenced to the Circus, Asterix himself speaks for the prosecution, outlining all the "wrongdoings" committed by himself and Obelix. The whole audience, including Typhus and the Humerus family, is moved by this plea, and the Gauls are sentenced to death in the Circus. In the cells, they enjoy luxurious food funded by Typhus and Humerus. But, as they are about to enter the arena, Asterix and Obelix learn that Caesar is not present, having gone off to fight pirates. Therefore, the Gauls refuse to go into the arena until he returns, which results in the big cats in the arena eating each other, a mass riot of the audience, and everyone (including Asterix and Obelix and the last remaining lion) being evicted from the circus.

That night, Asterix and Obelix sleep at a doorway, where they are woken by brigands. They defeat the brigands, after which their chief, Habeascorpus, offers Asterix and Obelix shelter in return for their help in robberies. Asterix accepts, but attempts to warn the victim they are assigned, who turns out to be a drunken Metatarsus. Refusing to attack an innocent, Asterix and Obelix vanquish the bandits again. From Metatarsus, the two Gauls learn that Goldendelicius has been appointed as Caesar's personal slave, and that Caesar himself is due to hold a triumph for his victory over the pirates. Asterix and Obelix corner Goldendelicius in a tavern and coerce him into exchanging Caesar's laurel wreath for one of parsley. The next day, during the triumph, Goldendelicius nervously holds the parsley wreath over Caesar's head. Caesar does not acknowledge the switch, but secretly "feels like a piece of fish", which baffles him.

Upon Asterix and Obelix's return, Homeopathix arrives in his brother-in-law's village in order to eat the stew containing Caesar's laurel wreath, and Vitalstatistix states that a wealthy man like him would never eat such a meal in his own house. Homeopathix "agrees" by pointing out that it is overcooked and of poor quality, which provokes Vitalstatistix to strike him senseless. The album ends with the note that, with Asterix's cure for drunkenness now available to the Romans, they initiate a series of ever-increasing parties that result in the collapse of the empire.

== Named characters ==
- Asterix
- Obelix
- Vitalstatistix
- Impedimenta – Vitalstatistix' wife
- Homeopathix – Impedimenta's brother
- Tapioca – Homeopathix' wife
- Kumakros – One of Caesar's slaves
- Typhus – Owner of The House Of Typhus
- Osseus Humerus
- Fibula – Osseus Humerus' wife
- Tibia – Osseus Humerus' daughter
- Metatarsus – Osseus Humerus' son
- Goldendelicius – Osseus Humerus' slave, now Caesar's slave
- Titus Nisiprius – lawyer
- Habeascorpus – Chief of a group of thieves
- Julius Caesar

== Notes ==
- This is by far the most adult-oriented of all the Asterix stories. It includes drunkenness, human slavery, debauchery, particularly graphic violence, androgyny, and instances of humour requiring (for Asterix) an unusually sophisticated knowledge of art and history to fully understand it. There is an implicit acknowledgement of this in that Dogmatix (a favourite with younger readers) makes only a token (2 panel) appearance, and the lettering in the original version of this album uses a style more cursive and difficult to read than usual, again discouraging younger readers (the updated version released in 2004 uses the same lettering style as all the other Asterix stories).
- In this album, a drunk Obelix coins the term "zigackly", a twisting of the word "exactly". In the original French version, the twisted word is "farpaitement", whose original is "parfaitement", French for "perfectly". Only in the last instance where Obelix makes use of that term does he use the word "perfectly" instead. The English translation also includes Asterix and Obelix using the words "ferpectly right".
- At Typhus's store, a male slave makes poses based on famous statues: Auguste Rodin's The Thinker, Apollon of Olympia, the Laocoon, and the Discobolus.
- The recipe for the hangover cure is: Cook an unplucked hen, carbolic soap, jam, black peppercorns, salt, kidney, figs, honey, black pudding, pomegranate seeds, egg and Spanish pepper.
- The lawyers in Asterix and Obelix' trial intend to make use of the phrase Delenda Carthago for dramatic effect. This sentence ("Carthage must be destroyed") was a favorite finishing sentence of Cato the Elder in each of his senate speeches.
- The Circus Maximus wrangler makes a cameo appearance in The Twelve Tasks of Asterix. He is the only one-shot background character to do so.
- The trainer standing next to the fatted lion in the arena is a caricature of Jean Richard, a French actor who ran a zoo and a circus outside Paris.
- Caesar's campaign against the pirates (here the ones Asterix and Obelix frequently encounter) was inspired by a real incident wherein a younger Caesar was captured by pirates who demanded a ransom for his return — and which he himself subsequently increased on the grounds that he was worth more. The ransom was paid and Caesar released; but he later captured and executed the pirates, as he himself had promised them during his captivity.
- In the original French version and some other translations, the speech given by the Circus Maximus tour guide is given in various dialects and in Fraktur script. This pun effect is somewhat lost in the original English version.
- This volume made an appearance in the Mr. Bean episode, Goodnight Mr. Bean.

== In other languages ==
- Arabic: أستريكس و إكليـل الغار (Asteriks we-iklil el-ghar)
- Catalan: Els llorers del Cèsar
- Croatian: Cezarove lovorike
- Czech: Asterix a Vavřínový věnec
- Danish: Cæsars laurbær
- Dutch: De lauwerkrans van Caesar
- Finnish: Asterix ja Caesarin laakeriseppele (also translated into Helsinki slang under the title Kessen rehukotsa, roughly meaning "Caesie's weed hat")
- Galician: Os loureiros do César
- Gaelic: Asterix agus Crùn Cheusair
- German: Die Lorbeeren des Cäsar
- Greek: Οι δάφνες του Καίσαρα
- Hungarian: Caesar babérkoszorúja
- Irish: Asterix agus Coróin Labhrais Chaesair
- Italian: Asterix e gli allori di Cesare
- Latin: Laurea Caesaris
- Norwegian: Cæsars laurbær
- Polish: Laury Cezara
- Portuguese: Os louros de César
- Serbian: Cezarove lovorike
- Spanish: Los laureles del César
- Swedish: Caesar Lagerkrans
- Turkish: Asteriks ve Sezar'ın Tacı
- Welsh: Asterix a choron Cesar
