= Drôles de zèbres =

- Directed by: Guy Lux
- Written by: Guy Lux
- Produced by: Jean-Pierre Rawson; Anne-Marie Toursky
- Starring: Patrick Topaloff; Coluche; Annie Cordy; Claude François; Sim; Petula Clark; Katia Tchenko
- Cinematography: Georges Barsky
- Edited by: Pierre Gillette
- Music by: Jean-Pierre Doering
- Production company: Alexia Films
- Distributed by: AMLF
- Release date: 1977
- Running time: 90 minutes
- Country: France
- Language: French

Drôles de zèbres (English: Funny Zebras, a French expression roughly meaning "Odd people") is a 1977 French comedy film.

Two unemployed men, heavily in debt due to losses at the racetrack, are hired by a criminal mastermind to harass the guests of a hotel he hopes to purchase at a below-market price in order to access a tunnel below the building that leads directly to a nearby bank.

Written and directed by Guy Lux, the film stars Patrick Topaloff, Coluche, Annie Cordy, Claude François, Sim, Petula Clark, and Katia Tchenko.
