= Asterix at the Olympic Games (film) =

2008 French fantasy comedy film

- French theatrical release poster
- Astérix aux Jeux olympiques
- Directed by: Frédéric Forestier; Thomas Langmann
- Screenplay by: Alexandre Charlot; Thomas Langmann; Frank Magnier
- Based on: Asterix at the Olympic Games by René Goscinny; Albert Uderzo
- Produced by: Thomas Langmann; Jérôme Seydoux
- Starring: Gérard Depardieu; Clovis Cornillac; Benoît Poelvoorde; Alain Delon; Vanessa Hessler; Franck Dubosc; José Garcia; Stéphane Rousseau; Jean-Pierre Cassel; Élie Semoun; Alexandre Astier
- Cinematography: Thierry Arbogast
- Edited by: Yannick Kergoat; Vincent Tabaillon
- Music by: Frédéric Talgorn
- Production companies: Pathé Renn Productions; La Petite Reine
- Distributed by: Pathé Distribution (France, Switzerland and United Kingdom); Constantin Film (Germany and Austria); Tripictures (Spain); Warner Bros. Pictures (Italy)
- Release date: January 30, 2008
- Running time: 117 minutes
- Countries: France; Spain; Germany; Italy
- Language: French
- Budget: $113.5 million
- Box office: $133 million

Asterix at the Olympic Games (French: Astérix aux Jeux olympiques) is a 2008 fantasy comedy film co–directed by Frédéric Forestier and Thomas Langmann, and written by Langmann, Alexandre Charlot and Frank Magnier, based on characters from René Goscinny and Albert Uderzo's Astérix comic series. A sequel to Asterix & Obelix: Mission Cleopatra (2002), it is the third installment in the Asterix film series.

At the time of its release, it was the most expensive French and non English-language film of all time. The film was negatively received by critics, but performed well at several European box offices, topping charts in Poland, Spain and France. Gérard Depardieu reprises his role as Obelix from the two previous live-action Asterix films, though the role of Asterix is taken over by Clovis Cornillac, replacing Christian Clavier. The film features Alain Delon's last acting performance (though he did appear as himself in two further films). It is also the final film of actors Jean-Pierre Cassel and Sim, who play respectively Getafix and Geriatrix.

== Plot ==
Astérix and Obélix must win the Olympic Games in Greece in order to help their friend Lovesix marry Greek princess Irina. Brutus uses every trick in the book to have his own team win the game and get rid of his father Julius Caesar in the process.

The film is loosely adapted from the original Asterix at the Olympic Games comic book. The love story subplot between Lovesix and Irina was not featured in the original story. Brutus, portrayed here as a comical villain with no relation to his depictions in Asterix comics, is the main antagonist, although he was not even featured as a character in the original comic book.

== Cast ==
- Gérard Depardieu as Obelix
- Clovis Cornillac as Asterix
- Benoît Poelvoorde as Brutus
- Jean-Pierre Cassel as the Druid Getafix
- Alain Delon as Julius Caesar
- Bouli Lanners as Samagas
- Franck Dubosc as Cacofonix
- Jean-Pierre Castaldi as Castaldus
- Michael Bully Herbig as Pasunmotdeplus, Brutus' mute sidekick
- Dorothée Jemma as Impedimenta
- Santiago Segura as Docteurmabus
- Vanessa Hessler as Princess Irina
- Stéphane Rousseau as Lovesix
- José Garcia as Couverdepus
- Sim as Geriatrix
- Vincent Moscato as Goth
- Luca Bizzarri as Alpha
- Paolo Kessisoglu as Omega

There is a cameo of Adriana Karembeu as Mrs Geriatrix and Jamel Debbouze reprises his role as Numerobis. Italian comedy actor Enrico Brignano appears as a reporter.

The film featured several cameos by real-life sports stars, most prominently by Michael Schumacher as Schumix, but also Jean Todt, Zinedine Zidane, Tony Parker and Amélie Mauresmo. Professional wrestler Nathan Jones portrays Humungus. The part of Roman athlete Claudius Cornedurus (Gluteus Maximus), played by Jérôme Le Banner, was originally to be played by Jean-Claude Van Damme.

== Production ==
=== Filming ===
Filming took place in Alicante (including the Ciudad de la Luz studio), Spain and lasted six months.

== Reception ==
=== Box office ===
The film grossed $23.4 million in France in its opening weekend, which was more than 60% of its gross in 19 territories in which the film was released. Box Office Mojo estimated $38.7 million in revenue within a week after the film was released.

== See also ==
- Asterix films (live action)
