= Bun Hay Mean =

French comedian (1981–2025)

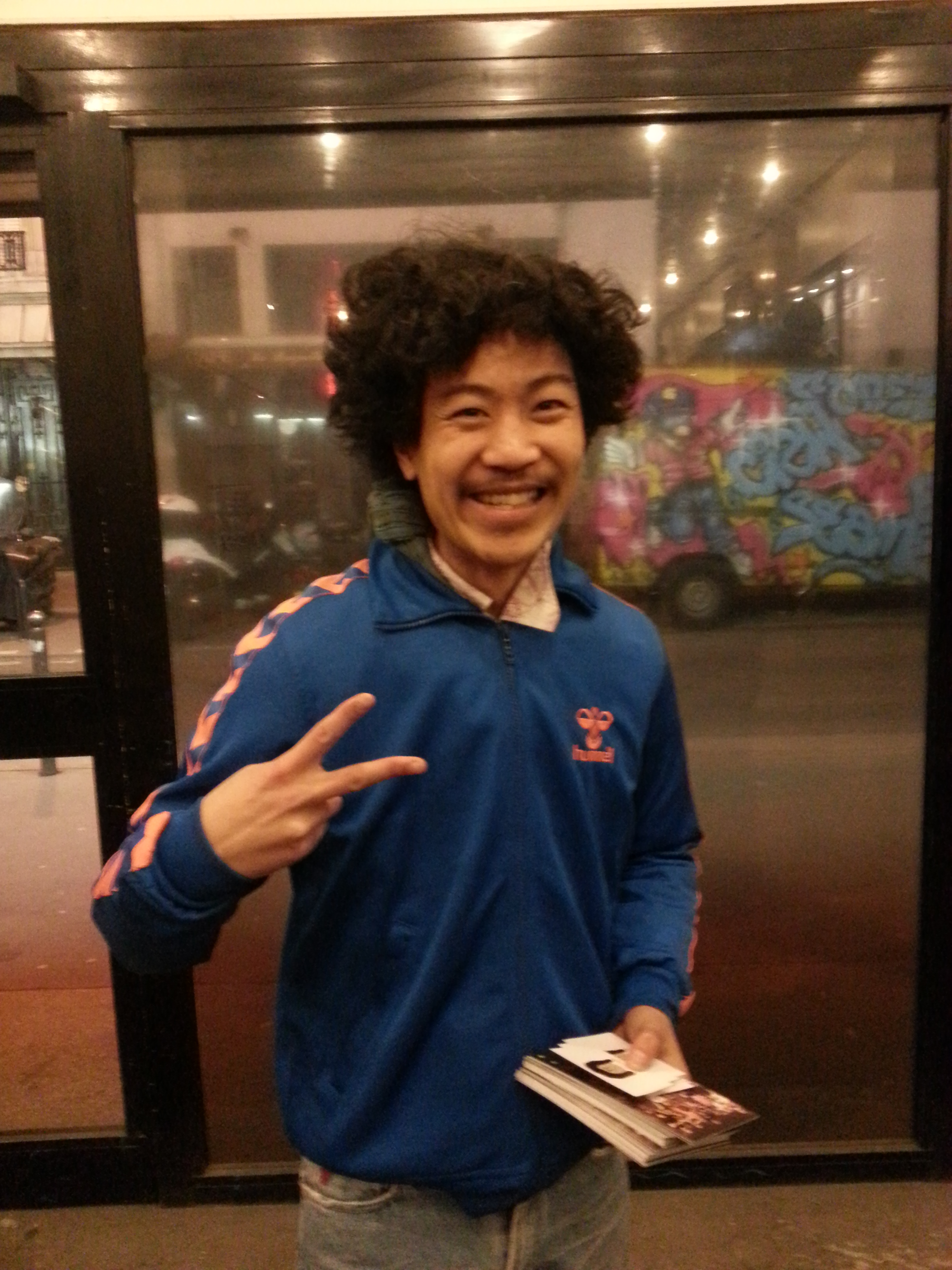
- Mean in 2013
- Born: 29 November 1981; Lormont, Gironde, France
- Died: 10 July 2025 (aged 43); Paris, France
- Occupation: Comedian

Bun Hay Mean (29 November 1981 – 10 July 2025), also known as Chinois marrant, was a French comedian.

== Life and career ==
Mean was born on 29 November 1981 in Lormont, to a Cambodian mother and a Chinese father. His parents moved to the suburbs of Bordeaux in 1977, after fleeing the Khmer Rouge regime. During his teenage years, he began to write sketches and perform stand-up in various cafés in Bordeaux, while taking improvisation classes in parallel with his studies.

After relocating to Paris, he began acting, appearing in the 2011 film, De l'huile sur le feu, and Comme un chef in 2012. He continued to perform stand-up comedy, and eventually appeared on the Jamel Comedy Club show in 2014. He appeared at the Montreux Laughter Festival in 2016 and 2017, and in the Éric Judor film Problemos.

In 2023, he was credited in Asterix & Obelix: The Middle Kingdom.

=== Death ===
Mean died on 10 July 2025, at the age of 43, after falling eight floors from a building in the 17th arrondissement of Paris. He was attempting to retrieve his phone that had fallen into a gutter on his balcony.
