= Patrick Topaloff =

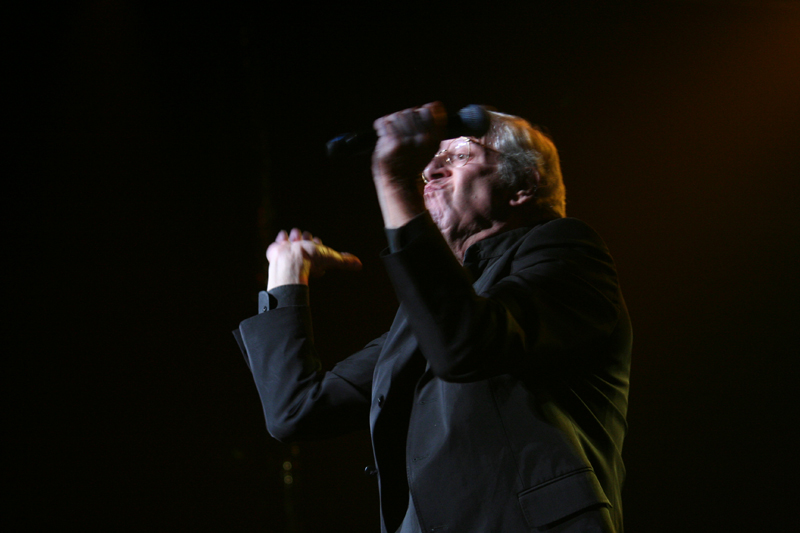
- Patrick Topaloff in 2007

Background information
- Born: 30 December 1944; Paris, France
- Died: 7 March 2010 (aged 65) Sèvres, France
- Genres: French pop music
- Occupations: Comedian, singer, actor

Patrick Topaloff (30 December 1944 – 7 March 2010) was a French comedian, singer, and actor.

The son of a Georgian father and a Corsican mother which, according to him, made him "a delicate Franco-Russian dessert", Topaloff began his career on Europe 1, where his comic antics drew a wide audience, especially among children who delighted in his many silly catch phrases. Popular singer Claude François encouraged him to try his hand at singing, and his recording of "Il Vaut Bien Mieux Etre Jeune, Riche et Beau" ("It's Much Better to Be Young, Rich, and Beautiful") became a major hit and the first of several gold records.

In the late 1960s and throughout the 1970s, writer and director Philippe Clair cast Topaloff in several slapstick comedy films similar to the Carry On series in the UK or those made by Jerry Lewis in the US after splitting with Dean Martin. His last feature film was Drôles de Zèbres for writer/director Guy Lux in 1977.

In his later years, problems in Topaloff's private life overshadowed his professional successes. Deeply in debt, he frequently worked without billing to avoid liens being placed on his salary. In 1995, he was sentenced to a year in prison for non-payment of alimony and taxes. Paroled after four months, he undertook a new and successful stage career.

== Death ==
He died, aged 65, from a heart attack. His autobiography, Les Pleurs du Rire (Tears of Laughter), was a major bestseller.
