= Olaf Wijnants =

Dutch actor (born 1948)

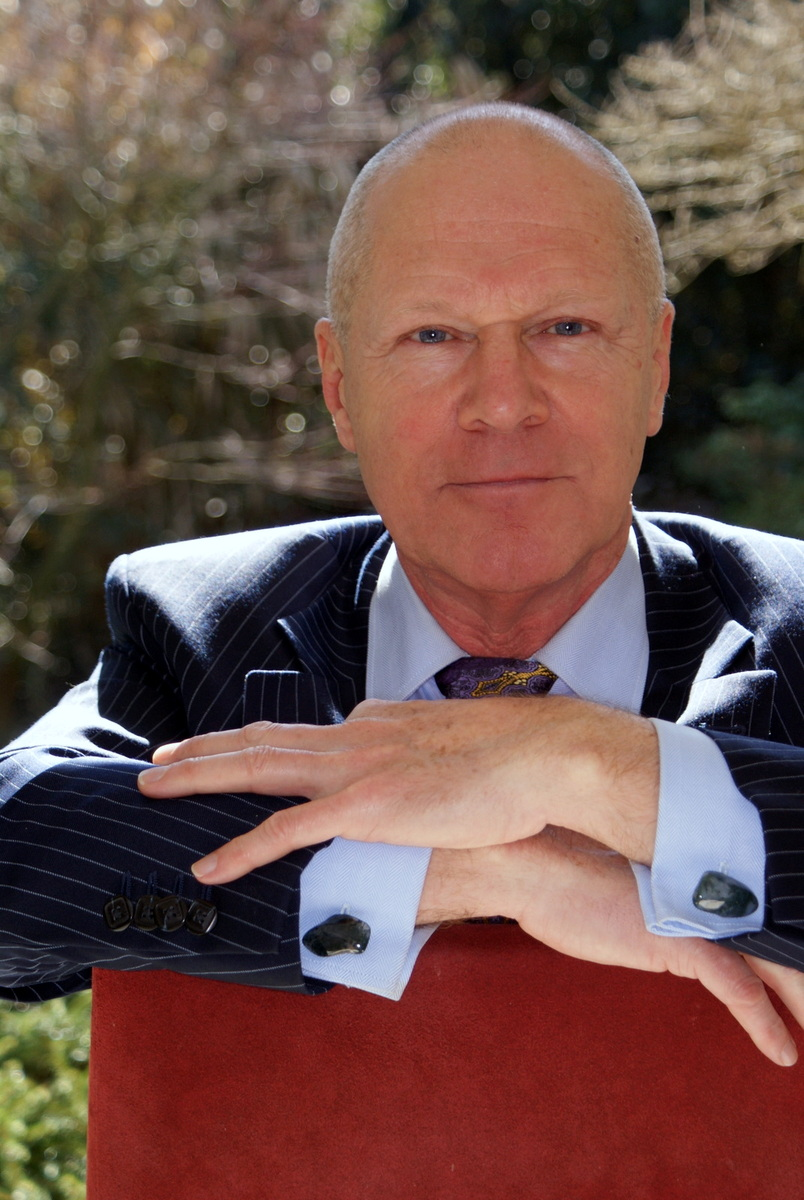
- Born: 14 September 1948 (age 77); The Hague, Netherlands
- Occupation: Actor
- Years active: 1971–present

Olaf Wijnants (born 14 September 1948 in The Hague) is a Dutch actor, who has been active in Film and Television since 1971.

== Career ==
Wijnants is best known in The Netherlands for appearing in several successful Dutch Television programmes such as Swiebertje, Goede tijden, slechte tijden, Toen Was Geluk Heel Gewoon and Kinderen geen bezwaar. Although he is probably best remembered for his voice over work, having dubbed the characters Asterix, Big Bird (in Sesame Street) and The Mayor (in The Powerpuff Girls) for the Dutch audience. Wijnants has also dubbed Asterix for the UK audience in the 1999 film Asterix & Obelix Take on Caesar.

Wijnants also works as a voice over artist on television and radio stations and is the voice of the Royal Dutch Touring Club and KPN.
