= Asterix (character) =

Comic book character

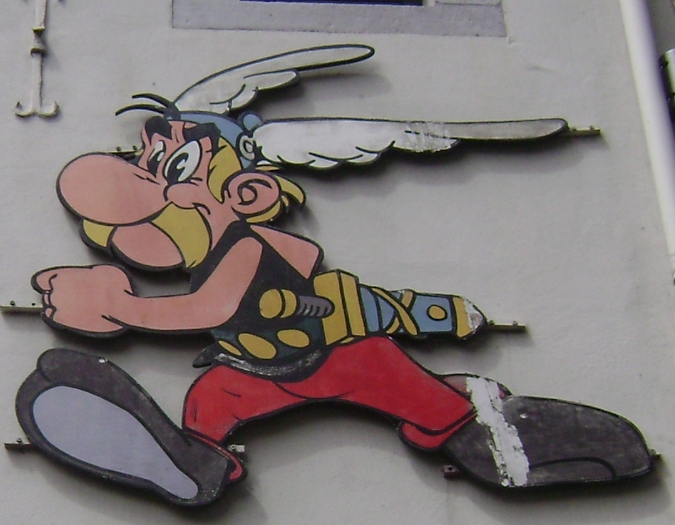

Publication information
- Publisher: Dargaud
- First appearance: Asterix the Gaul (1959)
- Created by: René Goscinny; Albert Uderzo

In-story information
- Alter ego: Astérix (Gaul)
- Team affiliations: The small Gaulish village in Armorica.
- Abilities: High Intelligence; Master strategist Expert combatant After drinking a magic potion made by the druid Getafix; Superhuman strength Superhuman durability Superhuman speed Superhuman reflexes Superhuman agility Superhuman endurance Superhuman stamina

Asterix (/ˈæstərɪks/ AST-ər-iks; French: Astérix [asteʁiks]) is a fictional character and the titular hero of the French comic book series Asterix.

The series portrays him as a diminutive but fearless Gaulish warrior living in the time of Julius Caesar's Gallic Wars. Asterix was created in 1959 by writer René Goscinny and illustrator Albert Uderzo. Since then, more than forty books in the series have been released, with Uderzo taking over writing duties after the death of Goscinny in 1977. Asterix has also appeared in several animated and live-action film adaptations of the series, and serves as the mascot of the amusement park Parc Astérix. Before that, he was also the mascot of the magazine Pilote.

== Character synopsis ==
Asterix is a diminutive but fearless and cunning warrior, ever eager for new adventures. He lives around 50 BC in a fictional village in northwest Armorica (a region of ancient Gaul mostly equivalent to modern Brittany). This village is celebrated as the only part of Gaul still not conquered by Julius Caesar and his Roman legions. The inhabitants of the village gain superhuman strength by drinking a magic potion prepared by the druid, Getafix (French: Panoramix). The village is surrounded by, on one side, the ocean, and on the other by four unlucky Roman garrisons, intended to keep a watchful eye and ensure that the Gauls do not get up to mischief. These camps are Compendium, Aquarium, Laudanum and Totorum.

Asterix' parents are former villagers who now live in the city of Condatum (Rennes), and he has cousins in Britannia (Britain). He shares his birthday with his clumsy, oversized, but extremely strong and good-hearted best friend, Obelix. Asterix is one of the smartest and most sensible members of the village, and so he is usually chosen for any dangerous, important or exotic mission. Unlike most of the other villagers, he does not start or join brawls for the fun of it, although he does enjoy a good fight when there's cause. He rarely resorts to weapons, preferring to rely on his wits, and when necessary, his (magic potion enhanced) fists – though he carries his shortsword with him at all times, he is shown to be an occasional swordsman at best. What he does for a living is never truly known, though he is often shown going on missions, quests, or hunting. In Asterix and the Cauldron, however, it is clearly stated that neither he nor Obelix have ever done anything of the sort to 'earn' money. Asterix is most often simply described as a warrior, which makes sense in light of the fact that most of the adventures he undertakes at some point require engaging an enemy.

Although no romantic interest has been introduced for Asterix yet, it seems obvious that Asterix is more susceptible than his best friend Obelix to the charms of women. Asterix seems 'lovestruck' after receiving a kiss from Panacea towards the end of Asterix the Legionary and remains so till the last strip. He also seems similarly affected by a kiss from Latraviata, the female protagonist in Asterix and the Actress, although then it seems that Latraviata's effect on Asterix may have gone deeper, as he reflects on her (or maybe something else) during the journey back to their village. Again, while many may agree that both Asterix and Obelix share the same feelings for the same woman, Panacea (judging from the way Asterix often looks at her, trusts her, obeys her, and even goes as far as to kiss her in a hypnotic trance) it may simply be an act of instinct rising out of loneliness, as both Asterix and Obelix do not often get close to women. In the film Asterix and Obelix: Mission Cleopatra, he becomes infatuated by Cleopatra's handmaiden Giemeakis (whose kiss proves to have a dramatic effect on Asterix, making him capable of superhuman feats without using the magic potion), but this is not based on anything from the original books.

An occasional running gag is that his age is 'indeterminate'. In the collection of adventures Asterix and the Class Act, one story about his birth is called "In 35 BC" with the note "Before Caesar", referring to the time Caesar's reign began, in October 49 BC. Also, in page 24 of Asterix and Obelix's Birthday: The Golden Book, Asterix's passport is shown, in which his date of birth is said to be LXXXV(85) BC. From this, Asterix's age can be placed approximately at 35 years.

One of Asterix's most recognizable features is his winged helmet, its wings often falling into positions that match his expressions. It closely resembles the winged helmet featured on packets of Gauloises cigarettes.

== Portrayal ==
Asterix was first voiced by Guy Piérauld in a radio play that aired in 1960. In 1967, Roger Carel assumed the voice of Asterix in the animated film Asterix the Gaul, providing the character's voice in all subsequent animated films as well as videogames until his retirement. The 2018 animated film Asterix: The Secret of the Magic Potion starred Asterix's original live action film actor, Christian Clavier, as the voice of Asterix, and in subsequent appearances Asterix has been voiced by Jean-Claude Donda.

In English dubs, Asterix has been voiced by Lee Payant, Sean Barrett, Jack Beaber, Bill Oddie, Henry Winkler, Craig Charles, Paul Giamatti, Ken Kramer, Jack Whitehall, and Brian Bowles.

In the live-action adaptations of the series made since the late 1990s, Asterix was played by Christian Clavier (Asterix and Obelix take on Caesar and Asterix & Obelix: Mission Cleopatra) then Clovis Cornillac (Asterix at the Olympic Games) then Édouard Baer (Asterix and Obelix: God Save Britannia) and Guillaume Canet (Asterix & Obelix: The Middle Kingdom). Olaf Wijnants dubbed the English voice for the first two, while in the third film's dub, Asterix is voiced by Leslie Clack.

== References in other works ==
Asterix is referred to in The Adventures of Tintin, in the story Tintin and the Picaros, in which one of the revellers in the Carnaval wears an Asterix costume. The reverse happens in "Asterix the Legionary", where one of the Belgian soldiers wears Tintin's distinctive hairstyle, and in Asterix in Belgium, where two characters Thomson and Thompson from The Adventures of Tintin make a guest appearance.

The series is also referred to in Larry Gonick's The Cartoon History of the Universe Volume 2. Asterix, Obelix and Vitalstatistix appear in several panels depicting the historical invasion of Rome by the Gauls.

In Miraculous: Tales of Ladybug & Cat Noir, Bakerix which is one of the akumatized forms of Rolland Dupain is modelled after Asterix.

== See also ==
- List of Asterix characters
