= Sim (actor) =

French comic actor (1926–2009)

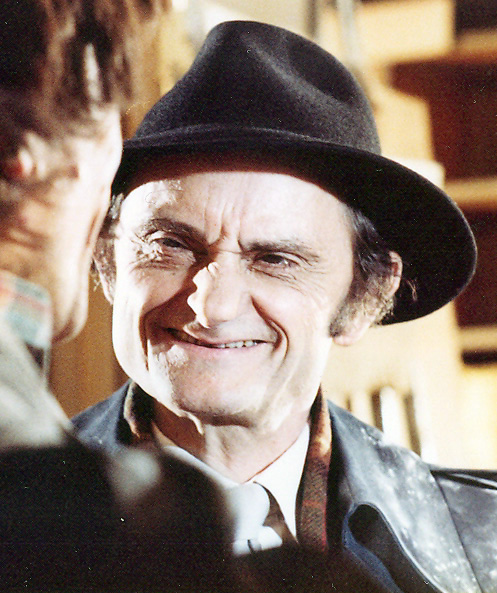
- Sim as Inspecteur Armagnac in the television film Les Rats de cave, produced by Jean-Claude Morin in 1981 for FR3
- Born: Simon Jacques Eugène Berryer; 21 July 1926; Cauterets, Hautes-Pyrénées département, France
- Died: 6 September 2009 (aged 83); Fréjus, Var, France
- Occupations: Comedian, writer, actor
- Years active: 1946-2009

Sim (born Simon Jacques Eugène Berryer; 21 July 1926 – 6 September 2009) was a French comedian, actor and writer. He was part of the team on Les Grosses Têtes, a radio and TV programme. He also played the part of Geriatrix in the films Asterix and Obelix vs Caesar and Astérix at the Olympic Games.

== Biography ==
Simon Jacques Eugène was born on 21 July 1926 to engineer Henri Berryer and his wife Marie-Thérèse (née Bonnemazou). At the time of his birth, Henri was an electrician for the director Abel Gance and grip on the film Napoléon.

=== Childhood ===
The family lived in a small flat in the Rue du Fer-à-Moulin, a cinema district in the 5th arrondissement of Paris, where Simon spent the most part of his earliest years at flats 26, then 28. Very early on, his Russian uncle working at Synchro-Standard took Berryer to see the first talking pictures, which he would remember all his life.

In 1936, the family moved to Nantes when Berryer senior found work as a technician at Le Majestic cinema (later L'Olympic, then La Fabrique).

=== Adolescence ===
At the age of eleven, Barryer founded a comedy group called "Sim-Art". (age fourteen, according to other sources). In 1939, with his friend Jojo, Sim got his first award in a funny face competition organised on 15 August at Saint-Julien-de-Concelles. Age fourteen, they played truant and performed sketches in a cellar, with fake letters to their school justifying their absence. Simon later studied at De Launey technical college in Nantes.

In 1941 his parents took over a cinema, L'Éden, in the small town of Ancenis (between Nantes and Angers). The family moved from Nantes to Ancenis en 1942 and reopened the cinema. Sim continued his studies at the Joubert d'Ancenis lycée and worked as projectionist in the family business.

=== Theatre ===
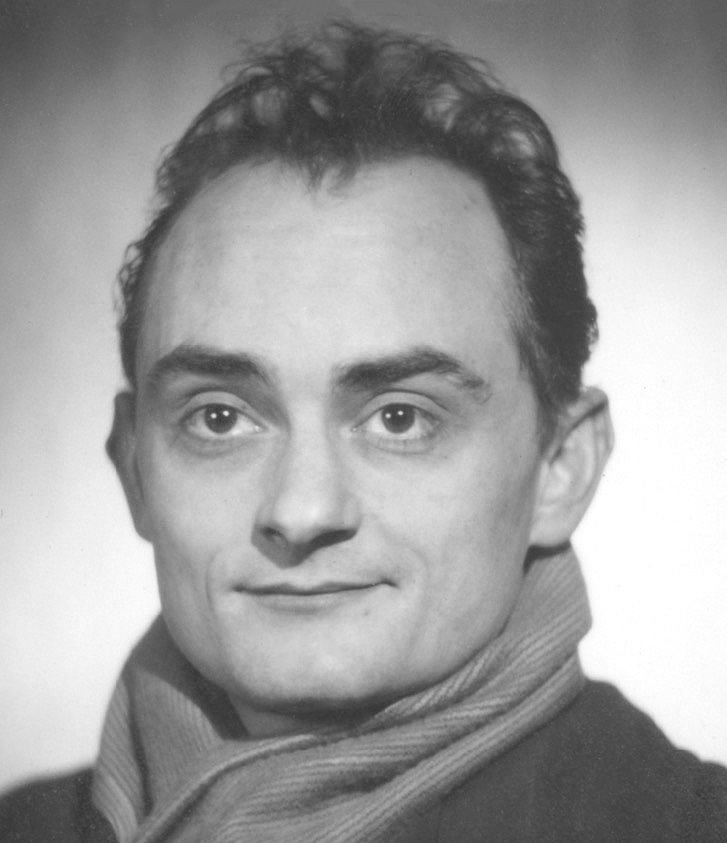
Sim in 1956

In 1946, the Berryer family stopped working at the Ancenis to start a film distribution company at Rennes, without success. The Berryer parents returned to Ancenis but Sim – now married – stayed in Rennes as a projectionist at Le Royal. This venue also staged musical performances, so Sim saw performances from Edith Piaf, Yves Montand, Henri Salvador, Maurice Chevalier, among others. He practiced his comedy, alone, after the performances. He won a contract as a humorous singer in a ballroom. He was spotted by Étienne Perrin, with whom he performed a comic clown act Etty et Balta.

At the end of 1953, he toured as a comic song act in the Paris cabaret clubs, often in drag, as at Madame Arthur in Montmartre. He also worked at the Crazy Horse Saloon as a dresser. This stage of his career would be resurrected in Elle boit pas, elle fume pas, elle drague pas, mais... elle cause ! by Michel Audiard, where he plays a schoolteacher who has a spare-time drag act.

=== Television and cinema ===
In the 1960s, he was part of Jean Nohain's team producing animated children's television, and performed the Baronne de la Tronche-en-Biais in a Guy Lux production.

In the 1970s he was part of many televised sketch shows. He also performed comic sketches and songs with humourist Édouard Caillau on RTBF's Chansons à la carte. In France, he was a regular performer in short comic sketches, often in costume, on Guy Lux's programmes.

The 1970s saw his best cinema work. Sim also took part in the radio (and later television) programme Les Grosses Têtes, from its start in 1977, and was a regular panellist on the television game show L'Académie des neuf.

He took part in directing the television series Louis la Brocante, in which he played the role of Théodore in many episodes, as well as other roles.

=== Death ===
Sim died of a pulmonary embolism on 6 September 2009, aged 83, at the Bonnet community hospital in Fréjus, Var where he was being treated for pneumonia.

His funeral took place on 11 September 2009 at the Church of Saint Peter and Saint Paul in Roquebrune-sur-Argens, where he had lived for nine years. His wife Marie-Claude and daughter Laurence were accompanied by many famous performers, including Victor Lanoux, Jacques Balutin, Évelyne Buyle, Philippe Bouvard and Pierre Sisser. The celebrant was Father Jérôme Renard. He was cremated at Vidauban (Var) and his ashes scattered in the crematorium's garden of remembrance.

== Filmography ==
Year	Title	Role	Notes
1958	Les gaités de l'escadrille		
1969	A Golden Widow	Il Vecchio - un tueur sur le retour	
1970	Elle boit pas, elle fume pas, elle drague pas, mais... elle cause !	Phalempin	
1971	The Married Couple of the Year Two	Lucas - le compatible de Gosselin	
1971	La grande maffia...	Balempier, le chef de service	
1973	La brigade en folie	Commissaire Grospèze	
1974	La grande nouba	Alexandre Ladislas Ladretsky, le pianiste / Le poissonnier	
1976	Andréa	Mehmet	
1977	Le roi des bricoleurs	Malju	
1977	Drôles de zèbres	Napoléon Simfrid / La baronne de la Tronchembiais	
1980	Sacrés gendarmes	Le gendarme légionnaire	
1980	Touch' pas à mon biniou	Gaëtan	
1984	Pinot simple flic	Vénus, le photographe	
1990	The Voice of the Moon	Flute player	
1999	Asterix & Obelix Take On Caesar	Geriatrix	
2008	Asterix at the Olympic Games	Geriatrix	
