= Dorothée Jemma =

French actress

- Born: 16 June 1956 (age 68); Paris, France
- Occupation: Actress
- Years active: 1970–present

Dorothée Jemma (born 16 June 1956) is a French actress specializing in dubbing. She is the dub voice of Jennifer Aniston, Melanie Griffith and Sheryl Lee.

== Biography ==
Her father, Jean-Louis Jemma, is best known for the dub voice of Zorro. She originally wanted to be a dancer, but her father turned her towards the world of theater. She started her career as an actress at the age of 16.

Living in the countryside, she enjoys horseback-riding and skiing.

== Theater ==
Year	Title	Author	Director
1973	Les Femmes Savantes	Molière	Michel Debane
1974	Tonight We Improvise	Luigi Pirandello	Jacques Destoop
1975	The Baron in the Trees	Italo Calvino	Jacques Échantillon

== Filmography ==
Year	Title	Role	Director	Notes
1975	Ce soir on improvise	Dorina	Jean-Marie Coldefy	TV movie
1975	Un changement de saison		Jacques Krier	TV movie
1976	Gustalin	Jeannette	Guy Jorré	TV movie
1977	Gloria	Lili Clape	Claude Autant-Lara	
1977	Histoire de la grandeur et de la décadence de César Birotteau	Césarine Birotteau	René Lucot	TV mini-series
1977	Ne le dites pas avec des roses	Véronique Lafoy	Gilles Grangier	TV series (1 episode)
1978	Un ours pas comme les autres	Nicole	Nina Companeez	TV mini-series
1979	Coup de tête	Marie	Jean-Jacques Annaud	
1979	Le temps des vacances	Natacha	Claude Vital	
1979	Mme de Sévigné: Idylle familiale avec Bussy-Rabutin	Louise de Rouville	Gérard Pignol & Jacques Vigoureux	TV movie
1979	Le tourbillon des jours	Mélanie	Jacques Doniol-Valcroze	TV mini-series
1979	Le pape des escargots	Manon	Jean Kerchbron	TV mini-series
1979	Les amours de la belle époque	Perrine	René Lucot (2) & Jean Pignol	TV series (2 episodes)
1980	The Wonderful Day	Gladys	Claude Vital (2)	
1980	Le coq de Bruyère	Mariette	Gabriel Axel	TV movie
1981	La ramandeuse	Sophie	Gabriel Axel (2)	TV movie
1981	Commissaire Moulin	Gigite	Jean Kerchbron (2)	TV series (1 episode)
1981	Au théâtre ce soir	Nadine	Pierre Sabbagh	TV series (1 episode)
1982	Guy de Maupassant	Countess Funk	Michel Drach	
1982	Le fou du viaduc	Catherine	Guy Jorré (2)	TV movie
1982	L'esprit de famille	Béatrice	Roland Bernard	TV series (1 episode)
1983	Deux amies d'enfance		Nina Companeez (2)	TV mini-series
1983	Médecins de nuit	Colette	Emmanuel & Vladimir Fonlladosa	TV series (1 episode)
1984	Marie Pervenche	Françoise	Claude Boissol	TV series (1 episode)
1985	Hôtel de police	Madame Guyot	Jean-Pierre Prévost	TV series (1 episode)
1985	Les Bargeot		Several	TV series (1 episode)
1986	À nous les beaux dimanches	Maryse	Robert Mazoyer	TV movie
1987	La baleine blanche		Jean Kerchbron (3)	TV movie
1989	La passion de Bernadette		Jean Delannoy	
1990	Tribunal	Madame Laporte	Christiane Spiero	TV series (1 episode)
1994	Dead Tired	The Pregnant Woman	Michel Blanc	
1994	Commissaire Moulin	Françoise Brunetti	Yves Rénier	TV series (1 episode)
1995	Une nana pas comme les autres	The butcher	Eric Civanyan	TV movie
1997	Maître Da Costa	Madeleine Plantu	Bob Swaim	TV series (1 episode)
1998	Dossier : disparus	Ghislaine Coletti	Antoine Lorenzi	TV series (1 episode)
1999	La traversée du phare	Madame Pertthuis	Thierry Redler	TV movie
2000	La crim'	Jocelyne Gallet	Dennis Berry	TV series (1 episode)
2000	Avocats & associés	Karine	Denis Amar	TV series (1 episode)
2002	Commissariat Bastille		Jean-Marc Seban	TV series (1 episode)
2003	Laisse tes mains sur mes hanches	Alice	Chantal Lauby	
2005	3 jours en juin	Madame Gollety	Philippe Venault	TV movie
2005	La battante	Genevieve	Didier Albert	TV mini-series
2008	Asterix at the Olympic Games	Bonemine	Frédéric Forestier & Thomas Langmann	
2009	Plus belle la vie	Edith Delvaux	Several	TV series (11 episodes)

== Dubbing ==
Year	Title	Role	Actress	Notes
1970-71	Mahō no Mako-chan	Mako	Kazuko Sugiyama	TV series (48 episodes)
1981-84	The Kabocha Wine	Lydia		TV series (95 episodes)
1981-86	The Fall Guy	Jody Banks	Heather Thomas	TV series (112 episodes)
1982	Night Shift	Belinda Keaton	Shelley Long	
1982	The Dark Crystal	Kira	Lisa Maxwell	
1983	Never Say Never Again	Domino Vitali	Kim Basinger	
1984	Glass Mask	Maya Kitajima	Masako Katsuki	TV series (23 episodes)
1984-87	Kimagure Orange Road	Sabrina		TV series (18 episodes)
1985	Ladyhawke	Isabeau d'Anjou	Michelle Pfeiffer	
1985	Water	Television P.A.	Darcy Flynn	
1985-87	The Colbys	Fallon Carrington Colby	Emma Samms	TV series (18 episodes)
1986	Peggy Sue Got Married	Delores Dodge	Lisa Jane Persky	
1986	Cobra	Ingrid Knudsen	Brigitte Nielsen	
1986	The Money Pit	Anna Crowley	Shelley Long (2)	
1987	Superman IV: The Quest for Peace	Lacy Warfield	Mariel Hemingway	
1987	Throw Momma from the Train	Beth	Kim Greist	
1987	Outrageous Fortune	Lauren Ames	Shelley Long (3)	
1987-88	Saint Seiya	June & Natasha	Hiromi Tsuru	TV series (2 episodes)
1988	The Presidio	Patti Jean Lynch	Jenette Goldstein	
1988	Mystic Pizza	Katherine "Kat" Arujo	Annabeth Gish	
1989	When Harry Met Sally...	Alice	Lisa Jane Persky (2)	
1989-91	Captain N: The Game Master	Princess Lana	Venus Terzo	TV series (49 episodes)
1989-92	Ranma ½	Annabelle, Géraldine, Frédérique & Grandma		TV series (18 episodes)
1990	Pacific Heights	Patty Palmer	Melanie Griffith	
1990	The Bonfire of the Vanities	Maria Ruskin	Melanie Griffith (2)	
1990-91	Twin Peaks	Laura Palmer	Sheryl Lee	TV series (18 episodes)
1991	Shattered	Nancy Mercer	Debi A. Monahan	
1991	K2	Cindy Jameson	Julia Nickson-Soul	
1991	City Slickers	Bonnie Rayburn	Helen Slater	
1992	Single White Female	Hedra "Hedy" Carlson	Jennifer Jason Leigh	
1992	Diggstown	Emily Forrester	Heather Graham	
1992	Memoirs of an Invisible Man	Ellen	Patricia Heaton	
1992	Shining Through	Linda Voss	Melanie Griffith (3)	
1992	A Stranger Among Us	Emily Eden	Melanie Griffith (4)	
1992-93	Melrose Place	Rhonda Blair	Vanessa A. Williams	TV series (32 episodes)
1993	The Nightmare Before Christmas	Sally	Catherine O'Hara	
1993	Bank Robber	Candy	Lisa Spikerman	
1993-94	The Bots Master		Herself	TV series (40 episodes)
1993-2012	Days of Our Lives	Lexie Carver	Renée Jones	TV series (1226 episodes)
1994	The Flintstones	Wilma Flintstone	Elizabeth Perkins	
1994	Reality Bites	Vickie Miner	Janeane Garofalo	
1994-2002	Friends	Rachel Green	Jennifer Aniston	TV series (194 episodes)
1995	Lord of Illusions	Jennifer Desiderio	Sheila Tousey	
1996	Brassed Off	Sandra	Melanie Hill	
1996	Dream for an Insomniac	Allison	Jennifer Aniston (2)	
1996	Mulholland Falls	Katherine Hoover	Melanie Griffith (5)	
1997	The Nanny	Morgan Faulkner	Jane Sibbett	TV series (1 episode)
1997	Just Shoot Me!	Lorena	Shannon Maureen Brown	TV series (1 episode)
1997	Ivanhoë - Chevalier du roi	Rowena	Herself	TV series (1 episode)
1997-2000	Honey, I Shrunk the Kids: The TV Show	Diane Szalinski	Barbara Alyn Woods	TV series (66 episodes)
1997-2003	Buffy the Vampire Slayer	Drusilla / Diane Szalinski	Juliet Landau / Barbara Alyn Woods (2)	TV series (18 episodes)
1998	Can't Hardly Wait	Denise Fleming	Lauren Ambrose	
1998-99	L.A. Doctors	Dr. Sarah Church	Sheryl Lee (2)	TV series (22 episodes)
1999	The Iron Giant	Annie Hughes	Jennifer Aniston (3)	
1999	Office Space	Joanna	Jennifer Aniston (4)	
2000	Chicken Run	Ginger	Julia Sawalha	
2000	Nurse Betty	Betty Sizemore	Renée Zellweger	
2000	Twice in a Lifetime	Nancy Waldron	Markie Post	TV series (1 episode)
2000	Jackie Chan Adventures	Jade's Mother		TV series (1 episode)
2000	Mom's Got a Date with a Vampire	Lynette Hansen	Caroline Rhea	
2000-04	Angel	Drusilla	Juliet Landau (2)	TV series (8 episodes)
2001	Rock Star	Emily Poule	Jennifer Aniston (5)	
2001-02	Malcolm in the Middle	Karen	Amy Farrington	TV series (2 episodes)
2001-02	The Young and the Restless	Alex Perez	Alexia Robinson	TV series (6 episodes)
2002	The Good Girl	Justine Last	Jennifer Aniston (6)	
2002	Kingdom Hearts	Sally		Video game
2003	Shade	Eve	Melanie Griffith (6)	
2003	Bruce Almighty	Grace Connelly	Jennifer Aniston (7)	
2003	L'Oréal	Jennifer Aniston	Jennifer Aniston (8)	Commercial
2003	Kingpin	Marlene McDillon Cadena	Sheryl Lee (3)	TV series (6 episodes)
2004	Along Came Polly	Polly Prince	Jennifer Aniston (9)	
2004	Murder in Suburbia	Lauren Jackson	Katie Blake	TV series (1 episode)
2004	Crossing Jordan	Detective Annie Capra	Arija Bareikis	TV series (5 episodes)
2005	Capote	Marie Dewey	Amy Ryan	
2005	Derailed	Lucinda Harris	Jennifer Aniston (10)	
2005	Kingdom Hearts II	Sally		Video game
2005-06	One Tree Hill	Elizabeth 'Ellie' Harp	Sheryl Lee (4)	TV series (9 episodes)
2006	Volver	TV Host	Yolanda Ramos	
2006	Friends with Money	Olivia	Jennifer Aniston (11)	
2006	The Break-Up	Brooke Meyers	Jennifer Aniston (12)	
2006	Agatha Christie's Marple	Gwenda Halliday	Sophia Myles	TV series (1 episode)
2006	House	Stephanie	Sheryl Lee (5)	TV series (1 episode)
2007	Dirt	Tina Harrod	Jennifer Aniston (13)	TV series (1 episode)
2007-09	Dirty Sexy Money	Andrea Smithson	Sheryl Lee (6)	TV series (12 episodes)
2007-12	Gossip Girl	Dorota Kishlovsky	Zuzanna Szadkowski	TV series (79 episodes)
2008	Marley & Me	Jennifer Grogan	Jennifer Aniston (14)	
2008	The Love of Her Life	Becky	Marya Delver	TV movie
2008	Sense and Sensibility	Charlotte Palmer	Tabitha Wady	TV mini-series
2008	Pushing Daisies	Annabelle Vandersloop	Mary Kay Place	TV series (1 episode)
2009	He's Just Not That Into You	Beth Murphy	Jennifer Aniston (15)	
2009	Love Happens	Eloise	Jennifer Aniston (16)	
2009	Uncharted 2: Among Thieves	Elena Fisher	Emily Rose	Video game
2009	Bonux	The Mother		Commercial
2009	Desperate Housewives	Laura Miller	Barbara Alyn Woods (3)	TV series (1 episode)
2010	The Bounty Hunter	Nicole Hurley	Jennifer Aniston (17)	
2010	The Switch	Kassie Larson	Jennifer Aniston (18)	
2010	Cougar Town	Glenn	Jennifer Aniston (19)	TV series (1 episode)
2010	Alan Wake	Alice Wake		Video game
2011	Texas Killing Fields	Lucie Sliger	Sheryl Lee (7)	
2011	Just Go with It	Katherine Murphy	Jennifer Aniston (20)	
2011	Horrible Bosses	Dr. Julia Harris	Jennifer Aniston (21)	
2011	Wakfu		Herself	TV series (1 episode)
2012	Wanderlust	Linda Gergenblatt	Jennifer Aniston (22)	
2013	We're the Millers	Sarah "Rose" O'Reilly	Jennifer Aniston (23)	
2014	Automata	Dr. Susan Dupré	Melanie Griffith (7)	
2014	Horrible Bosses 2	Dr. Julia Harris	Jennifer Aniston (24)	
2015	Cake	Claire Bennett	Jennifer Aniston (25)	
2015	She's Funny That Way	Jane Claremont	Jennifer Aniston (26)	
2016	Mother's Day	Sandy Newhouse	Jennifer Aniston (27)	
2016	Storks	Sarah Gardner	Jennifer Aniston (28)	
2016	Office Christmas Party	Carol Vanstone	Jennifer Aniston (29)	
2017	The Yellow Birds	Maureen Murphy	Jennifer Aniston (30)	
