= Asterix and Obelix vs. Caesar =

1999 film by Claude Zidi

- French theatrical release poster
- Astérix & Obélix contre César
- Directed by: Claude Zidi
- Written by: Gérard Lauzier
- Based on: Asterix by: René Goscinny; Albert Uderzo
- Produced by: Vittorio Cecchi Gori; Claude Berri
- Starring: Christian Clavier; Gérard Depardieu; Roberto Benigni; Claude Piéplu; Gottfried John
- Cinematography: Tony Pierce-Roberts
- Edited by: Hervé de Luze; Nicole Saunier
- Music by: Jean-Jacques Goldman; Roland Romanelli
- Production companies: Katharina; Renn Productions; TF1 Fims Production; Bavaria Film; Bavaria Entertainment; Melampo Cinematografica
- Distributed by: AMLF (France); Cecchi Gori Group (Italy); Constantin Film (Germany)
- Release date: 3 February 1999
- Running time: 110 minutes
- Countries: France; Italy; Germany
- Language: French
- Budget: FFR 275 million ($48.5 million)
- Box office: $101.6 million

Asterix and Obelix vs. Caesar (French: Astérix & Obélix contre César), called in the United Kingdom and the Commonwealth Asterix and Obelix Take On Caesar, is a 1999 fantasy adventure comedy film directed by Claude Zidi, the first installment in the Asterix film series based on Goscinny and Uderzo's Astérix comics. The film combines plots of several Astérix stories, mostly Asterix the Gaul (Getafix's abduction), Asterix and the Soothsayer, Asterix and the Goths (the Druid conference), Asterix the Legionary (Obelix becoming smitten with Panacea) and Asterix the Gladiator (the characters fighting in the circus) but jokes and references from many other albums abound, including a humorous exchange between Caesar and Brutus taken from Asterix and Cleopatra, and the villain Lucius Detritus is based on Tullius Detritus, the main antagonist of Asterix and the Roman Agent (known as Tortuous Convolvulus in the English translation of the comic).

At the time of its release, the film was the most expensive production in French cinema of all time, making it the most expensive production in France for the twentieth century. It was a box-office success and would be followed by a sequel, Asterix & Obelix: Mission Cleopatra, released in 2002.

== Plot ==
Julius Caesar is celebrating his victory over all of Gaul, but Lucius Detritus has kept from him that one village has managed to resist them. Detritus travels to the garrison near the village where Caius Bonus (Crismus Bonus), the garrison's commanding Centurion, explains that the Gauls have a magic potion, which makes them invincible. Detritus decides to capture the potion for himself, and hearing that the clever Asterix and permanently invincible Obelix are the backbone of the Gaulish forces, attempts and fails to eliminate them.

A false soothsayer arrives at the village and predicts the arrival of Romans and treasure; despite Asterix's protests, the village believe him, wherefore when a Roman tax collector arrives, they drive off his forces and take the gold. The "soothsayer" later drugs and hypnotises Asterix to create a diversion while he recaptures the tax money; but news of the theft reaches Caesar, who comes to the garrison himself, demanding the legion attack. Upon witnessing the defeat of his army, he demands Detritus subdue the village or be fed to the lions.

Detritus disguises himself and some men as Druids and kidnaps Panoramix (Getafix) at a Druid conference. Asterix disguises Obelix as a legionary, and they enter the garrison to rescue the Druid, but are separated. Asterix joins Getafix in the dungeon, where the pair resist Detritus' demands to make the magic potion, until he tortures Idefix (Dogmatix). Detritus uses the potion to throw Caesar into a cell (locked in an iron mask), and takes command with an oblivious Obelix as his bodyguard. Obelix later helps Asterix, Getafix, Dogmatix, and Caesar escape.

Caesar co-operates with the Gauls to defeat Detritus, who mounts an attack on the villagers using his own magic potion. To defeat him, Panoramix brews a special version of the potion which creates dozens of duplicates of Asterix and Obelix. Caesar is returned to power, and grants the village its freedom.

=== Differences from the books ===
- It is revealed early in the film that the magic potion used by the Gauls only lasts for ten minutes. Such a short time limit is not implied in the original books, such as disguised legionary Caligula Minus holding a rock up for several hours in Asterix the Gaul or crooked adviser Codfix retaining superhuman strength until well into the daytime after drinking a ladleful of potion at night in Asterix and the Great Divide.
- In the book Asterix and the Roman Agent, a character named Detritus (in the original French version) was an agent of Caesar who was a master of manipulating people. In the movie Detritus appears to be more based on Crismus Bonus from Asterix the Gaul or Felonius Caucus from the book Asterix and the Big Fight.
- The fraudulent fortune-teller Prolix is based on the character of the same name in Asterix and the Soothsayer; as in the book, Asterix is the only villager who does not believe Prolix's false prophecies. In the film, Prolix manages to escape with stolen gold (which he conned the villagers into stealing from the Romans) and is not seen again, whereas in the book Prolix is ultimately exposed as a phony when the Gauls managed to surprise him (thereby proving he could not really see the future).
- The plotline of someone stealing a chest filled with gold comes from Asterix and the Cauldron, where Asterix is tasked with guarding a cauldron filled with money belonging to Whosemoralsarelastix, the chief of a fellow Gaulish village. The aforementioned is the one who has the gold stolen back from the village in order to avoid paying his taxes to the Romans as opposed to the soothsayer Prolix who does so in the film. Additionally, in the book the money is stolen by making a hole in the back of Asterix's hut while Asterix stands guard in the front of his house. In the film, Asterix is drugged and hypnotized into believing Obelix is Caesar resulting in a fight and causing a distraction for Prolix and his associates to steal the money and escape.
- Getafix's great-grandfather, who appears in the movie, is not mentioned in any of the books.
- In the books, Obelix's affection for Panacea was mostly comedic. In the movie, the romance is played for dramatic effect and is taken much more seriously.
- The unnamed wife of village elder Geriatrix is depicted as intensely concerned about her husband getting hurt in the film (she runs after him desperately telling him to not join in when the villagers have a fish fight and later when they attack a Roman legion) - in the books Mrs Geriatrix seems to be casually dominant over her husband, who humbly does everything she tells him to.

== Cast ==
Character	Original actor	English voice
Asterix	Christian Clavier	Olaf Wijnants
Obelix	Gérard Depardieu	Terry Jones
Tortuous Convolvulus	Roberto Benigni	John Pirkis (Lucius Detritus)
Vitalstatistix	Michel Galabru	Douglas Blackwell
Getafix	Claude Piéplu	John Baddeley
Prolix	Daniel Prévost	Harry Barrowclough
Cacofonix	Pierre Palmade	David Holt
Panacea	Laetitia Casta	Denise Rivera
Mrs. Geriatrix	Arielle Dombasle	Kate Harbour
Geriatrix	Sim	David Graham
Impedimenta	Marianne Sägebrecht	Edita Brychta
Julius Caesar	Gottfried John	Peter Marinker
Crismus Bonus	Jean-Pierre Castaldi	Rodney Beddal
Fulliautomatix	Jean-Roger Milo	David Cocker
Unhygienix	Jean-Jacques Devaux	Kerry Shale
Tragicomix	Hardy Krüger Jr.	David Graham
Malosine	Michel Muller	Dominic Borrelli
Anorexia	Olivier Achard	Derek Griffiths
Still	Jacques Delaporte	Geoffrey Bayldon
Druids	Philippe Lehembre	Geoffrey Bayldon
Druids	Jérôme Chappatte	Dominic Borrelli
Druids	André Chaumeau	David Graham
Druids	Paul Rieger	Derek Griffiths
Old Druid	Pierre Lafont	Dominic Borrelli
Complaintcontrix	Gaëtan Blum	Geoffrey Bayldon
Mathusalix	Jean-Yves Thual	Derek Griffiths
Gallic Sentinel	Martial Courcier	David Graham
Legionnaire in the Thickets	Jean-Marc Bellu	Geoffrey Bayldon
Fish Villagers	Pascal Librizzi	David Graham
Fish Villagers	Philippe Beautier	Dominic Borrelli
Fish Villagers	Lionel Robert	Derek Griffiths
Olibrius	Patrick Massieu	David Graham
Ticketdebus	Herbert Fux	Geoffrey Bayldon
Trolleybus	Beppe Clerici	Derek Griffiths
Brutus	Didier Cauchy	Dominic Borrelli
Stupid Man	Jean-Marie Paris	David Graham
Turtle Soldiers	Guillaume de Jouvencel	Derek Griffiths
Turtle Soldiers	Xavier Offant	Dominic Borrelli
Gallic Brawler	Jean-Marc Huber	Derek Griffiths
Mahout	Jürgen Lill	Geoffrey Bayldon
Roman Soldier	Olivier Parthonnaud	David Graham
Legionnaire	Holger Breiner	Dominic Borrelli
Dancers	Bénédicte Bos	Jessica Martin
Dancers	Alexandra Naudet	Jessica Martin
Dancers	Lydie Nury	Jessica Martin
Dancers	Julie Salgues	Jessica Martin

== Soundtrack ==
Soundtrack by Jean-Jacques Goldman and Roland Romanelli

- "Elle ne me voit pas" - 4:26
- "Lei non vede me" - 4:26
- "Asterix et Obelix contre César" - 2:20
- "L'Embuscade" - 2:07
- "L'Amour" - 3:52
- "Le Cirque Encore" - 5:15
- "La Serpe D'or" - 4:07
- "Falbala" - 1:48
- "Le Devin" - 2:43
- "L'Amour Toujours" - 3:45
- "Les Hallucinations D'Astérix" - 2:56
- "La Potion Magique" - 3:14
- "Bélenos" - 7:18
- "Obélix" - 3:44

== Reception ==
The film had the widest opening in France, being released on 780 screens. It had a record number of admissions on its opening day with 446,724, surpassing the 427,291 who attended The Visitors II: The Corridors of Time. After five days, it had sold 2.2 million tickets for a box office gross of $13.2 million.

== Accolades ==
- Golden Screen (1999)
- Bogey Award in Silver (1999)
- Bavarian Film Award (2000)

== Video game ==
An action video game based on the film, developed by Tek 5 and published by Cryo Interactive, was released for the PlayStation and the PC.

== See also ==
- Asterix films (live action)
