= Asterix & Obelix: Mission Cleopatra =

- French theatrical release poster
- Astérix et Obélix : Mission Cléopâtre
- Directed by: Alain Chabat
- Written by: Alain Chabat
- Based on: Asterix and Cleopatra by René Goscinny; Albert Uderzo
- Produced by: Claude Berri
- Starring: Gérard Depardieu; Christian Clavier; Jamel Debbouze; Monica Bellucci; Claude Rich
- Cinematography: Laurent Dailland
- Edited by: Stéphane Pereira
- Music by: Philippe Chany
- Production companies: Katharina/Renn Productions; TF1 Films Production; Chez Wam
- Distributed by: Pathé Distribution (France, United Kingdom and Switzerland); Miramax Films (Select territories; through Buena Vista International)
- Release date: January 30, 2002
- Running time: 107 minutes
- Countries: France; Germany
- Language: French
- Budget: $54.4 million (€50 million)
- Box office: $131 million

Asterix & Obelix: Mission Cleopatra (French: Astérix et Obélix : Mission Cléopâtre) is a 2002 fantasy comedy film written and directed by Alain Chabat and adapted from the comic book series Asterix by René Goscinny and Albert Uderzo. Based on the 1965 book Asterix and Cleopatra, which had previously been adapted into a 1968 animated film, it is the second installment in the Asterix film series, following Asterix and Obelix vs. Caesar (1999). Christian Clavier and Gérard Depardieu reprise their roles as Asterix and Obelix, alongside newcomers Jamel Debbouze, Monica Bellucci, Claude Rich, Gérard Darmon, Édouard Baer, Dieudonné, as well as Chabat himself. At the time, it was the most expensive French film ever made.

A critical success, it was also a major box office success in France, becoming its most successful film in 36 years and second biggest commercial success of all time after 1966's La Grande Vadrouille.

== Plot ==
Infuriated by belittlements, Queen Cleopatra makes a deal with Julius Caesar. If the Egyptians built a palace at Alexandria in three months, which is larger than Caesar's palace in Rome, he must acknowledge that Egypt was the greatest of nations. To perform this task, Cleopatra hires the architect Numerobis, on pain of death and much to the dismay of Cleopatra's usual architect, Pyradonis (Amonbofis in French version). He and his secretary Papyris discuss the druid Getafix (Panoramix in the original French), whose potion empowers its drinkers, and Numerobis goes in search of him.

Numerobis arrives in Gaul and persuades Getafix to embark with him to Alexandria. Once they arrive, they find construction has started already with many workers. Pyradonis realizes he must stop Numerobis from finishing the palace within the deadline by sabotage. First he attempts to start a uprising among the workers and gains their support because their working hours are too long and they are whipped too often. Getafix cooks a new potion which gives everyone super strength, allowing them to dramatically increase the pace of construction. Pyradonis them gets the shipping company to throw the shipments of stone into the Nile. Obelix attempts to climb the Great Sphinx and breaks off its nose, using his super strength to lift the structure and place the broken nose under it, crushing it.

Later, after Pyradonis gets Asterix, Obelix and Getafix trapped in a pyramid, Obelix drinks three drops of the potion and breaks a path for them to escape. They still get lost but Idefix (the dog) sneaks in and shows them the way out. After framing them for the attempted assassination of Cleopatra, Pyradonis finally decides to inform Caesar about the potion's use and the potential victory of Cleopatra. Caesar knows the Gauls (having failed to capture their village multiple times) and decides to besiege the construction site using Trebuchets until Asterix, Obelix and Getafix surrender. Numerobis, Papyris and the three Gauls defend the site and decide to inform Cleopatra of Caesar's actions. Meanwhile, Pyradonis and Numerobis, after drinking the potion, fight in the site until Numerobis finally wins the duel. Cleopatra arrives on the battlefield and reprimands Caesar's lack of sportsmanship. The Romans are forced to stop the siege and assist in continuing the construction, which is finished on time. The palace is inaugurated, and Caesar willingly names Egypt the greatest Empire there ever was. Numerobis wins a large amount of gold, Getafix receives manuscripts from the Library of Alexandria; Cleopatra and Caesar fall in love. All the protagonists partake in a banquet (including some of the movie's Roman antagonists).

== Cast ==
Character	Original actor	English voice
Asterix	Christian Clavier	David Coburn
Obelix	Gérard Depardieu	Dominic Fumusa
Edifis	Jamel Debbouze	Yul Vazquez
Otis	Édouard Baer	David Cowgill
Cleopatra	Monica Bellucci	Diane Neal
Julius Caesar	Alain Chabat	T. Scott Cunningham
Getafix	Claude Rich	Philip Proctor
Artifis	Gérard Darmon	Tom Weiner (Criminalis)
Cellularservis	Isabelle Nanty	Mary Elizabeth McGlynn
Kittypus	Chantal Lauby	Edie Mirman
Sucettalanis	Marina Foïs	Bridget Hoffman
Gluteus Maximus	Dieudonné	Lex Lang
Caius Lucius	Jean-Paul Rouve	Tom Kenny
Gimmeakis	Noémie Lenoir	Peggy O'Neal
Tiler	Zinedine Soualem	Sean McPhillips
Narrator	Pierre Tchernia	Erik Bergmann
Captain Redbeard	Bernard Farcy	Bob Papenbrook (Captain Bloody Beard)
Crustaceous	Jean Benguigi	Barry Stigler
Redbeard’s Daughter	Sophie Noël	Lia Sargent (Bloody Beard's Daughter)
Pegleg	Michel Crémadès	Philip Proctor
Pirate Lookout	Mouss Diouf	Stuart Robinson (Crow's Nest Lookout)
Sculptor	Abdel Soufi	Stuart Robinson
Caius Gazpachoandalus	Pierre Tchernia	Jonathan Nichols

=== Additional Voices ===
- English voice: David Coburn (Banquet Doorman), David Cowgill (Old Hayseed), Lex Lang (Jailer, Gaul Forest Centurion), Tom Kenny ("My Bad" Soldier), Stephen Apostolina (Hutchus, "Superpower" Soldier #2, Flying thru Intersection Soldier), Steve Blum (Starskyus, "Superpower" Soldier #1), Steve Bulen (Documentary Narrator, Catapult Commander, Slave Driver with Horn), Dan Edelstein (Roman on Horseback), Jason Harris Katz (Young Hayseed, Cat), Stuart Robinson (Roman Drill Instructor), Michael Sorich (Cleopatra's Portraitist, Bribed Boatman), Matt Adler, Kirk Baily, Steve Cassling, Elisa Gabrielli, Steve Kramer, Matthew Labyorteaux, Paul Pape

=== Additional actors ===
- Original actor: Dominique Besnehard (The Taster), Emma de Caunes (Caesar's Secretary), Édouard Montoute (Nexusis), Michel Elias

== Soundtrack ==
- "Mission Cleopatra" – Snoop Dogg and Jamel Debbouze
- "Asterix and Cleopatra" – Philippe Chany
- "I Got You (I Feel Good)" – James Brown
- "Yakety Sax" – Boots Randolph
- "The Imperial March (Darth Vader's Theme)" – John Williams
- "Ti amo" – Umberto Tozzi and Monica Bellucci
- "Chi mai" – Ennio Morricone
- "Walk Like an Egyptian" – Deep Forest feat. Beverly Jo Scott
- "Gaz-L" – JoeyStarr

== Release ==
The film had the widest opening in France at the time, opening on 950 screens.

== Home media ==
In the United Kingdom, it was watched by 570,000 viewers on television during the first half of 2005, making it the most-watched foreign-language film on UK television during that period.

== Reception ==
The film was a huge box office success in France where it sold over 14 559 509 tickets, becoming one of the most successful French films ever. It sold 22 799 038 tickets in Europe overall.

Despite the film's success, it was disliked by Asterix co-creator Albert Uderzo, who thought that Chabat's adaptation was not true to the comic's spirit and did not appreciate Debbouze's performance. This led him to reject the project of a live action adaptation of Asterix in Spain planned by producer Claude Berri.

== See also ==
- Asterix films (live action)
