= Asterix at the Olympic Games =

Comic book album

Asterix at the Olympic Games (Astérix aux Jeux olympiques)
- Date: 1972
- Series: Asterix

Creative team
- Writers: René Goscinny
- Artists: Albert Uderzo

Original publication
- Date of publication: 1968
- Language: French

Chronology
- Preceded by: Asterix and the Chieftain's Shield
- Followed by: Asterix and the Cauldron

Asterix at the Olympic Games is the 12th comic book album in the Asterix series. Serialized in Pilote issues 434–455 in 1968 (to coincide with the Mexico City Olympics), it was translated into English in 1972 (to coincide with the Munich Olympics). The story satirizes performance-enhancing drug usage in sports.

== Plot ==
At the Roman camp of Aquarium near the Gauls' village, Gluteus Maximus, an athletic Roman legionary, is chosen as one of Rome's representatives for the upcoming Olympic Games in Greece. Gaius Veriambitius, his centurion, hopes to share in the glory of Olympic victory. While training in the forest, Gluteus Maximus encounters Asterix and Obelix, who unintentionally outdo him at running, then javelin and boxing, thanks to the power of the magic potion. Demoralised, he consigns himself to sweeping the Roman camp instead of training. When Veriambitius asks Vitalstatistix that Gluteus Maximus be left alone, Vitalstatistix decides the Gauls should enter the Olympic Games as well. Veriambitius argues they cannot, as Romans are the only non-Greeks allowed, but Asterix rationalizes that as Gaul is part of the Roman Empire, they are technically Romans (despite their resistance to Roman rule), making them a Gallo-Roman team, demoralising the centurion and his legionary further. The Gauls hold trials that prove inconclusive as everyone is dosed with the magic potion and thus do everything at the same top speed and strength. Eventually, they decide to register only Asterix and Obelix as competitors.

The entire (male) population of the village travels to Olympia in Greece (aboard a galley where they have to do the rowing), where Asterix and Obelix register as athletes (with Getafix as their coach) and the others all enjoy a holiday. When Gluteus Maximus and Veriambitius discover that the Gauls have come to compete, they are left in despair (Vitalstatistix telling them "We're not stopping you entering, it's just that we're going to win"), and this despair spreads among all the Roman athletes. They give up training and spend all their time having elaborate parties, washing their uniforms and sweeping the whole area. The scent from their feasts eventually causes the Greek competitors to complain about their own healthy food. Alarmed, the Greeks send a judge to warn the Romans that even if they think drinking will somehow make them better athletes, it will be held against them as all artificial stimulants are forbidden, prompting Veriambitius to tell him about the Gauls' magic potion. The Gauls are dejected by the news that victory is not as certain as they had expected, but Asterix decides to compete anyway. Obelix, being permanently affected by the potion, now cannot compete and anyway doesn't quite understand what's going on – he thinks he's been dismissed just because he fell into a cauldron and wonders if telling the officials he fell into a regular pot or amphora will change anything.

At the games, Asterix and the Roman athletes are beaten at every turn by the Greeks, causing a dilemma to the Olympic officials. Although their victories prove what they've believed all along (that Romans are decadent barbarians and the Greeks are perfect beings), too much success will reflect badly on the country's reputation, so they announce a special race for just Romans. After the announcement, Asterix and Getafix start talking, very loudly, about a cauldron of magic potion left in an unguarded shed. Eager to win, the other Roman athletes steal the potion that night.

The race begins, and the Roman athletes easily beat Asterix - they all overtake him and cross the finish line simultaneously. After the race, Getafix accuses them of having used magic potion and, when the Romans deny the accusation, Asterix sticks his tongue out at them. When the Romans return the gesture, it is revealed that Getafix had added an extra ingredient to this particular batch of potion and the Romans now have blue tongues from drinking it. They are disqualified, and Asterix is declared the winner.

The Gauls return home for their traditional banquet. Getafix notices Asterix hasn't brought his Palm of Victory home. Asterix explains he gave it to someone who needed it more: Gluteus Maximus. Gluteus' apparent victory is shown to have greatly pleased Julius Caesar, who promotes Maximus to centurion and Veriambitius to tribune.

== Notes ==
- Geriatrix is named for the first time in this volume.
- The cart bringing the male Gauls to their inn after arriving in Greece plays the role of a coach.

== Film adaptation ==
A live action movie of this book was released in France in January 2008 to coincide with the Beijing Olympics. Even though it is similar to the original story, there are some differences. The main one being instead of the whole village taking part in the games, only Asterix, Obelix, Getafix, Dogmatix, and a new character named Lovesix take part in the games in order for Lovesix to win the heart of, and show his worthiness for, princess Irina. There is also another subplot about Julius Caesar's son Brutus, who also wants to marry the princess, overthrow his father and take over the Roman empire.

== Goscinny and Uderzo cameo ==
Authors Rene Goscinny and Albert Uderzo appear on page 29 in a carved bas-relief at the front of the Olympic Village. Goscinny is calling Uderzo a 'despot' and Uderzo replies with 'tyrant'. The two are pacifying a bull, implying that creating an Asterix story is a Herculean task.
