= Jamel Debbouze =

French actor, comedian and director (born 1975)

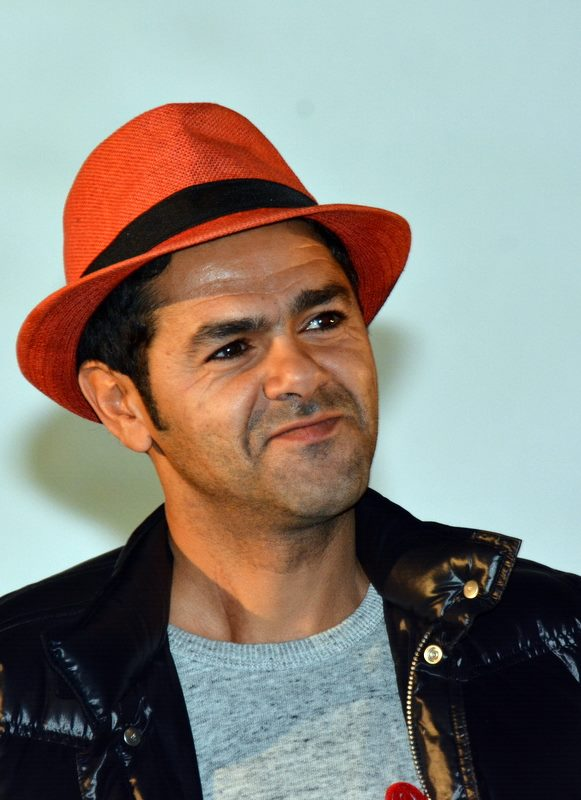
- Debbouze in 2016
- Born: 18 June 1975 (age 51); Paris, France
- Occupations: Actor, comedian, filmmaker
- Years active: 1992–present
- Spouse: Mélissa Theuriau (m. 2008)
- Children: 2
- Website: www.jameldebbouze.fr

Jamel Debbouze (French pronunciation: [dʒamɛl dəbuz]; Arabic: جمال دبوز, romanized: Jamāl Dabūz; born 18 June 1975) is a French-Moroccan actor, comedian and filmmaker. Best known for his stand-up comedy sketches, he also worked with director Alain Chabat in several films and other notable French comedians such as Florence Foresti, Élie Semoun, Fred Testot and Gad Elmaleh. Debbouze has starred in a number of box-office and critical successes, including Amélie (2001), Asterix & Obelix: Mission Cleopatra (2002), Days of Glory (2006) and Houba! On the Trail of the Marsupilami (2012). He is the producer and presenter of the Canal+ television show Jamel Comedy Club (2006–present).

== Life ==
Jamel Debbouze was born in Paris, France. His family, from Taza, moved back to Morocco the following year. They returned in 1979 and settled in Trappes in 1983, in the Paris region, where he spent the rest of his childhood. He has five younger siblings: Mohamed, Hayat, Karim, Rachid and Nawel.

On 17 January 1990, at the Trappes railway station, Debbouze and another boy of the same age were attempting to cross the track and both were hit by the Paris-Nantes train, travelling at 150 km/h. Debbouze lost the use of his right arm, and the other boy, the son of the Réunion-born singer Michel Admette, was killed. Admette and his wife brought proceedings against Debbouze—who was 14 years old at the time—for manslaughter. The case ended in a nolle prosequi. In December 2004, Debbouze was going to perform on stage on the French island of Réunion, but cancelled, claiming illness, as Michel Admette's family had organized a demonstration against his arrival. He has since never set foot on Reunion.

In 1995, Debbouze was spotted by the bosses of Radio Nova, Jacques Massadian and Jean-François Bizot, who made him famous (Massadian would become his manager). He debuted on Radio Nova, with a film review show, Le Cinéma de Jamel and on television around 1996–1997 on cable channel Paris Première, in a TV show co-produced by Radio Nova and the channel. He took Le Cinéma de Jamel to television on Canal+ in 1998. On the same channel, he contributed to another show, H, along with Éric Judor and Ramzy Bedia.

He acted in the movies Zonzon (1998), international box-office hit Amélie (2001), domestic hit Asterix & Obelix: Mission Cleopatra (2002), and Angel-A (2005, directed by Luc Besson).

In 2006, he acted in the historical movie Days of Glory (which he co-produced), paying tribute to the North African soldiers who fought for France during the Second World War. For this movie, he got the prize for best male actor at the 59th edition of the Cannes Film Festival with Samy Naceri, Roschdy Zem, Sami Bouajila and Bernard Blancan.

In April 2008, Debbouze opened a comedy club, called Le Comedy Club, in Paris aimed at launching newcomers on the stand-up scene.

On 29 March 2008, Debbouze became engaged to French journalist and news anchor Mélissa Theuriau; the two married on 7 May 2008 and subsequently had two children.

In 2009, Debbouze collaborated with the rap band 113 and Awa Imani for the project Maghreb United of Rim'K'.

On 1 December 2010, Debbouze's new DVD named Made in Jamel featuring the likes of Gad Elmaleh, Florence Foresti, Élie Semoun, Stromae, Didier Bourdon, Youness Ait Benouissaden, Hanane Nader, Noureddine Oussayah and Sophie Mounicot was released.

His show, Jamel improvise, debuted in January 2011, before playing every evening's Tout sur Jamel from 1 to 20 January at the Casino de Paris.

He was the chairman of the 2013 César Awards.

== Career ==
=== First works ===
In 1990, Debbouze met Alain Degois, an educator who organized theater improvisation workshops, and joined his troupe. With this troupe, he took part in the French Championship of Improvisation in 1991 and toured Quebec and Morocco. In 1992, he got his first part in a film called Les Pierres Bleues du Désert. After this film, Debbouze wanted to work as an actor and create his own show. This happened in 1995 with the show C'est Tout Neuf which had been enjoyed a lot. Then he had an approximative role on the radio program Radio Nova and took part in the television program Nova Premiere where he was noticed by Canal+.

=== Debbouze's various shows ===
In 1998, Debbouze played Jamel Dridi, an operator, in the hospital sitcom, H on Canal+, alongside fellow comedians Eric and Ramzy. By the time the series ended in 2002, Debbouze had achieved national fame.

In March 1999, Debbouze started his new show Jamel en Scène. In this show, Debbouze talked about his beginnings, his childhood and show business. The show played at La Cigale and then at the Bataclan in Paris. He went on tour throughout France in 2000. At the end of the year, he returned to Paris with his show at the Olympia for three weeks.

In 2002, Debbouze returned with a new show, 100% Debbouze. For three years this show played in the top Parisian theaters: the Casino de Paris, the Bataclan, Le Zénith, and the Olympia. He then toured France, Morocco, Tunisia, Switzerland, and Belgium. The DVD of the show went on sale in 2004, and sold more than 1 million copies.

In 2006, Debbouze became the presenter of a new program, Jamel Comedy Club, which featured a half-hour of the new generation of French humorists each week. With this troupe, Debbouze went to the Casino de Paris in 2007 for a new show, Le Jamel Comedy Club Envahit le Casino de Paris. This show was very successful, its run was extended and it also played in Canada.

=== Cinematic works ===
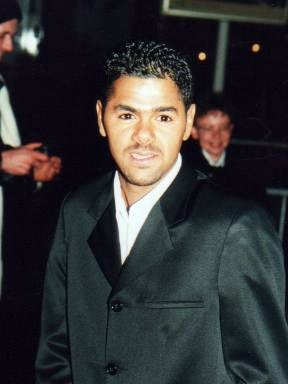
Debbouze at the 2001 César Awards

In 1992, the seventeen-year-old Debbouze appeared in his first film, Les Pierres Bleues du Désert. The film tells the story of a young boy who is persecuted because he believes in the existence of blue stones in the desert. It was the first of numerous film roles for Debbouze. In 1996, he played a small part in Les Deux papas et la maman, a film by Jean-Marc Doval with Smaïn and Arielle Dombasle. Three years later he received his first big role in a feature film called Le Ciel les oiseaux et ta ... mère! (Boys on the Beach). This comedy was successful, with more than one million tickets sold. Over the next two years he continued his stage shows, before returning to film with the highly successful Le fabuleux destin d'Amélie Poulain. He was nominated for his part in this film for the César Award for Best Supporting Actor in 2002. In 2002, Debbouze appeared in another big French film, Asterix & Obelix: Mission Cleopatra directed by Alain Chabat. This successful film was seen by 14,000,000 spectators. In 2005, he had the leading role in Luc Besson's film Angel-A.

In 2006, Debbouze played one of the most important parts of his career in the film Indigènes (Days of Glory in the United States). The film told the story of four North African soldiers who participate in the liberation of France during World War II. Debbouze, Samy Naceri, Sami Bouajila and Roschdy Zem shared the prize for the best male performance at the 2006 Cannes Film Festival.

=== Television work ===
In 1996, he took part for the first time in a TV show called Nova première on Paris Première. He was noticed on this show by some producers from Canal+ who hired him to present a show called Le cinéma de Jamel. For New Year's Eve in 2000, Debbouze created a TV show for this occasion called the Jamel show. Numerous French comedians such as Bruno Solo, Alain Chabat, Élie Semoun, and Dieudonné appeared in this show. In April 2003, he took part in 6 commercials for Orangina.

In 2024, Debouzze appeared in the opening ceremony of the 2024 Summer Olympics in Paris playing as a torchbearer who doesn't realise that the ceremony isn't going to be held in a stadium until he enters the Stade de France and seeing that it's completely empty.

== Personal life ==
On 29 March 2008, Debbouze got engaged to French journalist Mélissa Theuriau; the two were married on 7 May 2008. They had a son on 3 December 2008 named Léon and a daughter named Lila on 28 September 2011.

Growing up in Trappes, Debbouze became friends with fellow actor Omar Sy and professional footballer Nicolas Anelka.

== Filmography ==
Year	Original title	English title	Role
1992	Les pierres bleues du désert		
1996	Les Deux papas et la maman	Two Dads and One Mom	
1996	Y a du foutage de gueule dans l'air		
1998	Zonzon		Kader
1998–2002	H (TV series)		Jamel Dridi / Djamel Dridi
1998	Un pavé dans la mire		The prison guard
1999	Le Ciel, les oiseaux et... ta mère!	Boys on the Beach	Youssef
1999	Rêve de cauchemar		Saïd
1999	Les Petits souliers		Zinedine Haouita
2000	Elie annonce Semoun		various characters
2000	Granturismo		François
2000	Dinosaur		Zini (French voice only)
2001	Le fabuleux destin d'Amélie Poulain	Amélie	Lucien
2002	Asterix & Obelix: Mission Cléopatre	Asterix & Obelix: Mission Cleopatra	Numérobis / Edifis
2002	Le Boulet	Ball and Chain / Dead Weight	The Malian guard (uncredited)
2003	Les Clefs de bagnole	The Car Keys	An actor who refuses to shoot with Lawrence / Voice of the modelling-clay dog
2004	She Hate Me		Doak (also executive producer)
2005	Angel-A		André Moussah
2006	Indigènes	Days of Glory	Saïd Otmari (also a co-producer)
2008	Astérix aux jeux olympiques	Asterix at the Olympic Games	Numérobis
2008	Parlez-moi de la pluie	Let's Talk About the Rain	Karim
2009	Inside Jamel Comedy Club (TV series)		Jamel (also producer)
2010	Hors la loi	Outside the Law	Saïd
2011	360		Algerian man
2011	Poulet aux prunes	Chicken with Plums	Houshang / Beggar
2011	Hollywoo		Farres
2012	Sur la piste du Marsupilami	HOUBA! On the Trail of the Marsupilami	Pablito Camaron
2013	Né quelque part	Homeland	Cousin
2013	La marche	The Marchers	Hassan
2013	Monsters University		Art (French voice only)
2015	Pourquoi j'ai (pas) mangé mon père	Why I Did (Not) Eat My Father	Edward (voice; also director and screenwriter)
2016	La vache	The cow	Hassan
2018	Alad'2		Shah Zaman / Yanis
2019	Toy Story 4		Ducky (French voice only)
2019	The Lion King		Timon (French voice only)
2022	Le Nouveau Jouet	The New Toy	Sami

== Shows ==
Year	Title
1996	C'est tout neuf
1999	Jamel en scène
2000	Jamel Show
2004	Jamel 100% Debbouze
2007	Le Jamel Comedy Club Envahit Le Casino De Paris
2009	Le Jamel Comedy Club Show
2010	Made in Jamel
2011	Tout sur Jamel
2011	Le Marrakech du rire
