= Obelix =

Cartoon character in the French comic book series Asterix

Publication information
- Publisher: Dargaud
- First appearance: Asterix the Gaul (1959)
- Created by: René Goscinny; Albert Uderzo

In-story information
- Abilities: Permanent superhuman strength, provided by magical potion

Obelix (/ˈɒbəlɪks/ OB-əl-iks; French: Obélix [ɔbeliks]) is a cartoon character in the French comic book series Asterix. He works as a menhir sculptor and deliveryman as well as one of the primary defenders of the Gaulish village, and is Asterix's best friend. Obelix is noted for his obesity, the menhirs he carries around on his back and his superhuman strength. He fell into a cauldron of the Gauls' magic potion when he was a baby, causing him to be the only Gaul in Asterix's village who is in a permanent state of superhuman strength. Because of this already enormous strength, Obelix is not allowed to drink the magic potion ever again, a ban he regards as being tremendously unfair. Other characteristics are his simplemindedness, his love and care for his dog Dogmatix, his anger when someone refers to him as being "fat", his enthusiasm for hunting and eating wild boars, and beating up Romans. His catchphrase is: "Ils sont fous ces romains", which translates into "These Romans are crazy!", although he considers nearly every other nationality, even other Gauls, to be just as strange.

The character was portrayed by actor Gérard Depardieu in the first four Asterix live-action films until the role was taken over by Gilles Lellouche in 2023's Asterix & Obelix: The Middle Kingdom.

== Character ==
Obelix is Asterix's closest friend (they even have the same birthday—although this is inconsistent with the comic Obelix and Co., where only Obelix's birthday is celebrated). He generally works as a menhir delivery man. His passions in life are hanging around with Asterix, fighting, hunting and eating wild boar, making and carrying his menhirs, and beating up Roman legionaries (and occasionally collecting their helmets as trophies). Obelix has a little dog named Dogmatix (Fr. Idéfix), whom he adores. His parents live now in Condate (as seen in Asterix and the Actress) and his distant cousin Metallurgix, a famous golden sickle maker, lives in Lutetia (as seen in Asterix and the Golden Sickle).

Obelix's favourite food is roast wild boar which he usually hunts with Asterix, but he has a voracious appetite, and will try eating nearly anything with few exceptions; in Asterix and Obelix All at Sea and Asterix in Britain he seems not to like boiled boar. In fact, he eats nuts and oysters in the shell, and is completely oblivious to drugs, spicy food and poison, possibly due to the permanent effects of the magic potion. However, when he consumes alcohol, he gets very drunk very quickly, as seen for example in Asterix in Britain where he enjoys sampling different barrels of wine trying to find a barrel containing magic potion, or in Asterix and the Laurel Wreath, where both he and chief Vitalstatistix get drunk during a banquet, much to the shame of the latter's wife Impedimenta. Although he has his own house, Obelix is occasionally shown staying overnight at Asterix's.

Obelix owns the quarry where he chisels the menhirs himself. It is never directly stated what the menhirs are mostly used for aside from being Obelix’s personal blunt weapons. It is hinted that they are also just oversized knick-knacks; however they are probably a running-gag regarding the origins of the mystery surrounding Menhirs in ancient Europe, with the joke being that Obelix delivered them. Obelix usually trades the stones away for whatever he needs, resulting in the village having a literal field of menhirs.

Obelix is kind-hearted, but socially inept—possibly because his strength means that others have had to adapt to him instead of vice versa. He is still not completely aware of his own strength and almost invariably breaks any door he gently knocks on, making him a human battering ram. He is frequently used as a human battering ram for opening locked doors or breaking through walls. Similarly, he is unaware that others do not share his superhuman strength, and shows great surprise when others are crushed by what he calls "a little menhir", or when Asterix attempts to explain to him that a small dog like Dogmatix cannot lift a menhir. He also has little interest in subjects of formal education or intellectual pursuits, since sheer strength usually solves his problems; he generally leaves any decisions to Asterix. However, Obelix is not completely stupid. In Asterix and the Normans he deduces from various clues that Cacofonix the bard has gone to Lutetia to pursue a career in popular music: this unusual display of intelligence on Obelix's part surprises Getafix. He also surprises Asterix in Asterix and the Black Gold by reeling off a dictionary definition of wild boar in conversation (including the Latin taxonomical classification). He can also be quite dangerous when angered.

While cheerfully violent and enjoying a good fight, Obelix is far from brutal or sadistic: he tends to view fighting as a game and is generally friendly and polite (to the point of inappropriate courtesy) towards his opponents. He extends this benevolence even towards the Romans, whom he rarely seems to view as oppressors but more as less-willing participants in his rough-housing (The Romans themselves seem to view him as a terrifying ogre, whose infamy has spread across the entire Roman army). His other favored pastimes are dancing (which he apparently is very good at), and occasionally drinking goat's milk to excess (as he rarely imbibes in alcohol).

Like Asterix, Obelix is a bachelor, but he is easily smitten by a pretty face. He harbours a hopeless crush on Panacea, the daughter of Soporifix (one of the other villagers), and occasionally other young women, most notably Mrs. Geriatrix (which enrages her husband). However, one may think that he will eventually find a mate and have children since in Asterix and the Class Act, he is shown to be the founder of a long dynasty of French warriors that lasted well into the 20th century.

Obelix's trademark phrase is "These Romans are crazy" ("Ils sont fous ces romains": in the Italian translation, it is "Sono pazzi questi Romani", which can be shortened to S.P.Q.R., Rome's motto), although he has applied a variant of it to nearly every group he's met in his travels: "These Britons are crazy", "These Corsicans are crazy", etc. This remark is followed by him tapping his forehead. It is a parody of the quote "These Gauls are crazy", which Julius Caesar famously said while describing the Gauls' fighting style during his conquest of the region.

== Strength ==
Unlike the other villagers, Obelix has no need to drink the druid Getafix's magic potion that gives superhuman strength, because he fell into the cauldron as a baby and its effect on him became permanent. Obelix is tall and massive. He is about 6 feet 6 inches (198 cm) tall and he weighs more than 500 pounds (230 kg). The story of that incident is told in How Obelix Fell into the Magic Potion When he was a Little Boy. Since this effect was not intended or expected, Getafix refuses to allow him even one more drop except under the most dire circumstances (either out of fear for his life, or fear for the lives of others should the inattentive and uncoordinated strongman become any stronger), which annoys Obelix greatly. (In Asterix and Obelix All at Sea, it is revealed that too much of the potion can turn the drinker to stone; exactly how much is not known, but a whole cauldron will certainly do the trick. This appears to only work on grown people as Obelix did not turn to stone as a baby, or may simply occur after drinking an excessive amount while still under the effects of a previous dose). However, in Asterix and Cleopatra, Getafix gives him a few drops to open a door in the Great Pyramid's Labyrinth but he comments that he does not see much difference between "before and after the potion" though this is presumably because Obelix is used to accomplishing any physical task with ease.

Although it has been clearly stated by both Getafix (in Asterix the Gaul) and Asterix (in Asterix and the Laurel Wreath) that the magic potion does NOT grant invulnerability (Getafix has a potion for that but it is only mentioned in Asterix the Gaul), meaning that they could be injured by the Romans in their fights but their raw strength generally prevents the Romans getting the chance to do so, the same does not seem to be true of Obelix. He does not even notice when attackers attempt to knock him unconscious with blows to the head, when Roman spearheads are stuck in his bottom in Asterix in Corsica or when anyone else attempts to harm him in any way. This may imply that Obelix, either by stupidity or ignorance, simply does not notice or react to the pain that should be inflicted, or that the potion has enhanced his overall strength, since it has been shown to increase the drinker's endurance allowing them to run faster, to such a point where his muscles allow him to effortlessly absorb the attacks in question. Most of the occasions where Obelix demonstrates invulnerability include him being attacked physically rather than with sharp objects, as in Asterix and the Magic Carpet, when an arrow accidentally hits his bottom and he yells in agony, and thus showing that Obelix is not above physical pain.

Obelix does sometimes display twisted views, especially when it comes to the relationship between the Gauls and the Romans. As far as he is concerned the more Romans he can beat up the better and nobody should deny him this, not even the "selfish" Roman victims themselves:

- In Asterix in Britain, he dismisses the claim that the Romans have invaded Britain; he believes that the Britons dragged the Romans over there in order to have all the fun for themselves. During a rugby match, Obelix is bored until he sees how violent the game can get, and is overjoyed, recommending that they play rugby in Gaul.
- In Asterix in Corsica, it is revealed that the villagers attack the Romans at least once a year in order to celebrate the Gaulish victory at Gergovia. When the Romans leave their camps in order to avoid the attacks, Obelix sees this behaviour as crazy and detrimental to their "friendly" relationship.
- In Asterix and Obelix All at Sea, he has a dream (or nightmare as he puts it) in which the Romans pull out of Gaul. He's horrified at the idea of such a dream coming true. He also declares that the idea of peace with the Romans is offensive to the memory of Vercingetorix. Far more likely is the fact that peace will mean that he will not be able to bash the Romans anymore, a prospect he dreads. He then comments on the good "sense" of the Romans in attacking the village (although they were actually merely planning a parade to welcome an admiral).
- The Roman civil war between Caesar and Pompey features in both Asterix the Legionary and Asterix and the Actress. When he witnesses a battle between Roman troops, Obelix murmurs "What a waste!". But this is not so much on the wasted lives as the fact that it means that he has fewer Romans to bash himself.

== Portrayal ==
Albert Augier voiced Obelix in a 1960 radio play. For the animated films, he has been voiced by Jacques Morel in the first three, Pierre Tornade in all films during the '80s and '90s, as well as the videogames Asterix & Obelix XXL and Asterix & Obelix XXL 2: Mission: Las Vegum, Jacques Frantz in the 2006 film Asterix and the Vikings and the videogame Asterix at the Olympic Games, and currently Guillaume Briat since the 2014 film Asterix: The Mansions of the Gods. In the English dubs of the animated films, he has been voiced by Hal Brav, Michael Kilgarriff, Billy Kearns, Bernard Bresslaw, Rosey Grier, Howard Lew Lewis, Brad Garrett, C. Ernst Harth, and Nick Frost.

In the live action films, Gérard Depardieu played Obelix until Gilles Lellouche took over the role for Asterix & Obelix: The Middle Kingdom. The English dubs for these films have featured Obelix's voice being provided by Terry Jones, Dominic Fumusa, and Paul Bandey.

Gilles Lellouche would later reprise the role of Obelix for the 2025 Netflix animated miniseries, Asterix and Obelix: The Big Fight. Ben Crowe provides Obelix's voice for the English dub of the series.

== Name ==
Obelix's name is a pun on obélisque (obelisk), suggested by his rotund physique and his habit of casually carrying heavy stone monoliths (menhir). It might be an allusion to the obelus (obèle), a typographical mark ("†") often found with the asterisk, after which Asterix is named.

== See also ==
- List of Asterix characters
- Obelignathus
