= Adriana Hunter =

British translator of French literature

Adriana Hunter is a British translator of French literature. She is known for translating over 100 French novels, such as Fear and Trembling by Amélie Nothomb or The Girl Who Played Go by Shan Sa. She has been short-listed for the Independent Foreign Fiction Prize twice. In 2011 she won the Scott Moncrieff Prize for her translation of Véronique Olmi's Beside the Sea. In 2013, she won the 27th Annual Translation Prize founded by the French-American Foundation and the Florence Gould Foundation for her translation of Electrico W by Hervé Le Tellier (2013). She is also a contributor to Words Without Borders. She lives in Kent, England. In 2017, she became the English translator for new comic albums in the Asterix series.

== Translations from French ==
The dates refer to the publication of the English translation.

- The Disappearance: A Primer of Loss by Geneviève Jurgensen (2000).
- Five Photos of My Wife by Agnès Desarthe (2001).
- The Darkest Red by Viviane Moore (2001).
- Fear and Trembling by Amélie Nothomb (2002).
- Telling Lies by Sophie Marceau (2001).
- 9.99: A Novel by Frédéric Beigbeder (2002).
- Good Intentions by Agnès Desarthe (2002).
- Death in the Dordogne by Louis Sanders (2002).
- The White Way by Viviane Moore (2002).
- The Girl Who Played Go by Shan Sa (2003).
- The Englishman's Wife by Louis Sanders (2003).
- The Sexual Life of Catherine M by Catherine Millet (2003).
- How I became Stupid by Martin Page (2004).
- Holy Smoke by Tonino Benacquista (2004).
- All That I Have by Laurent Joffrin (2004).
- Grey Souls by Philippe Claudel (2005).
- Someone Else by Tonino Benacquista (2005).
- UV by Serge Joncour (2005).
- Oscar and the Lady in Pink by Eric-Emmanuel Schmitt (2005).
- Framed by Tonino Benacquista (2006).
- The Woman in the Row Behind by Françoise Dorner (2006).
- Empress by Shan Sa (2006).
- The Unforeseen by Christian Oster (2007).
- Death of an Ancient King by Laurent Gaudé (2007).
- Kick the Animal Out by Véronique Ovaldé (2007).
- When I Was a Soldier by Valérie Zenatti (2007).
- A Bottle in the Gaza Sea by Valérie Zenatti (2008).
- Chez Moi by Agnès Desarthe (2008).
- Eldorado by Laurent Gaudé (2008).
- Noir: A Novel by Olivier Pauvert (2008).
- Five Photos of My Wife by Agnès Desarthe (2008).
- Alexander and Alestria: A Novel by Shan Sa (2009).
- And My See-through Heart by Véronique Ovaldé (2009).
- Scandalous by Laura D (2009).
- Once on a Moonless Night by Dai Sijie (2010).
- In the Train by Christian Oster (2010).
- Where We Going, Daddy?: Life with Two Sons Unlike Any Others by Jean-Louis Fournier (2010).
- Tehran, Lipstick and Loopholes by Nahal Tajadod (2010)
- Enough about Love by Hervé Le Tellier (2011).
- The Intervention of a Good Man by Hervé Le Tellier (2011).
- Beside the Sea by Véronique Olmi (2012).
- Climates by André Maurois (2012).
- The Conflict: How Modern Motherhood Undermines the Status of Women by Elisabeth Badinter (2012).
- Life Is Short and Desire Endless by Patrick Lapeyre (2012).
- Balzac's Omelette: A delicious tour of French food and culture with Honore de Balzac by Ankha Muhlstein (2012).
- The Crab and the Lamb by Manu Cornet (2012).
- Holy Smoke by Tonino Benacquista (2012).
- Noah's Child by Eric-Emmanuel Schmitt (2012).
- My Brother Simple by Marie-Aude Murail (2012).
- The Diary of a Nose: A Year in the Life of a Parfumeur by Jean-Claude Ellena (2013).
- The Foundling by Agnès Desarthe (2013).
- Two Small Footprints in Wet Sand: A Mother's Memoir by Anne-Dauphine Julliand (2013).
- Under the Tripoli Sky by Kamal Ben Hameda (2013).
- Electrico W by Hervé Le Tellier (2013).
- Chez Moi by Agnès Desarthe (2013).
- The Son by Michel Rostain (2013)
- The Red Collar by Jean-Christophe Rufin (2015).
- Reader for Hire by Raymond Jean (2015).
- The Travels of Daniel Asher by Déborah Lévy-Bertherat (2015).
- A Special Day by Anne-Dauphine Julliand (2015).
- Couple Mechanics by Nelly Alard (2015).
- Her Father's Daughter by Marie Sizun (2016).
- The Passion of Mademoiselle S. by Jean-Yves Berthault (2016).
- The Gardens of Consolation by Parisa Reza (2016).
- The Pen and the Brush by Anka Muhlstein (2017).
- Who You Think I Am by Camille Laurens (2017).
- Asterix and the Chariot Race by Jean-Yves Ferri and Didier Conrad (2017).
- Hitler, My Neighbor by Edgar Feuchtwanger with Bertil Scali (2017)
- Who You Think I Am by Camille Laurens (2017).
- Woman at Sea by Catherine Poulain (2018)
- How to Find Love in the Little Things by Virginie Grimaldi (2018).
- The Last of Our Kind by Adélaïde de Clermont-Tonnerre (2018).
- The Twelve Tasks of Asterix by Albert Uderzo and René Goscinny (2018).
- All Happy Families by Hervé Le Tellier (2019)
- Bakhita by Véronique Olmi (2019)
- If: A Mother's Memoir by Lise Marzouk (2019)
- Asterix and the Chieftain's Daughter (comics) by Jean-Yves Ferri and Didier Conrad (2019)
- Chasing the Stars by Virginie Grimaldi (2019).
- This Little Family by Inès Bayard (2020)
- All About Sarah by Pauline Delabroy-Allard (2020)
- The Heart, Frida Kahlo in Paris by Marc Petitjean (2020)
- Sapiens: A Graphic History volume 1 by Yuval Noah Harari, David Vandermeulen and Daniel Casanave (2020)
- The Life I Was Meant to Live by Julien Sandrel (2020).
- My Sardinian Summer by Michaël Huras (2020)
- I Just Wanted to Save My Family by Stéphane Pélissier (2021).
- Back to Japan by Marc Petitjean (2021).
- Winter Flowers by Angélique Villeneuve (2021).
- The Anomaly by Hervé Le Tellier (2021).
- Asterix and the Griffin (comics) by Jean-Yves Ferri and Didier Conrad (2021).
- Camille Pissarro: The Audacity of Impressionism by Anka Muhlstein (2023).
- Asterix and the White Iris by Fabcaro, illustrated by Didier Conrad (2023).
