= Manu Cornet =

- Born: Emmanuel Cornet; 21 January 1981 (age 45); Paris, France
- Education: École alsacienne Lycée Saint-Louis; École normale supérieure
- Years active: Late 2000s–present
- Employer(s): Google; Twitter
- Website: ma.nu

"Organizational Charts" by Manu Cornet

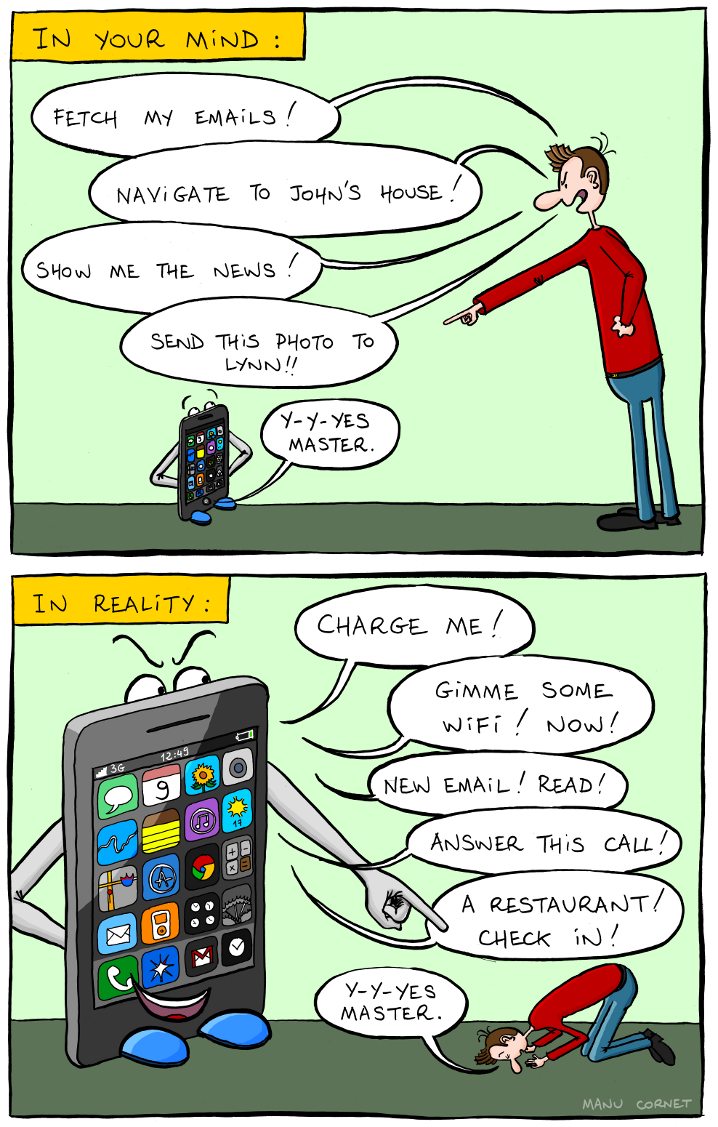
"Mobile Relationship" by Manu Cornet

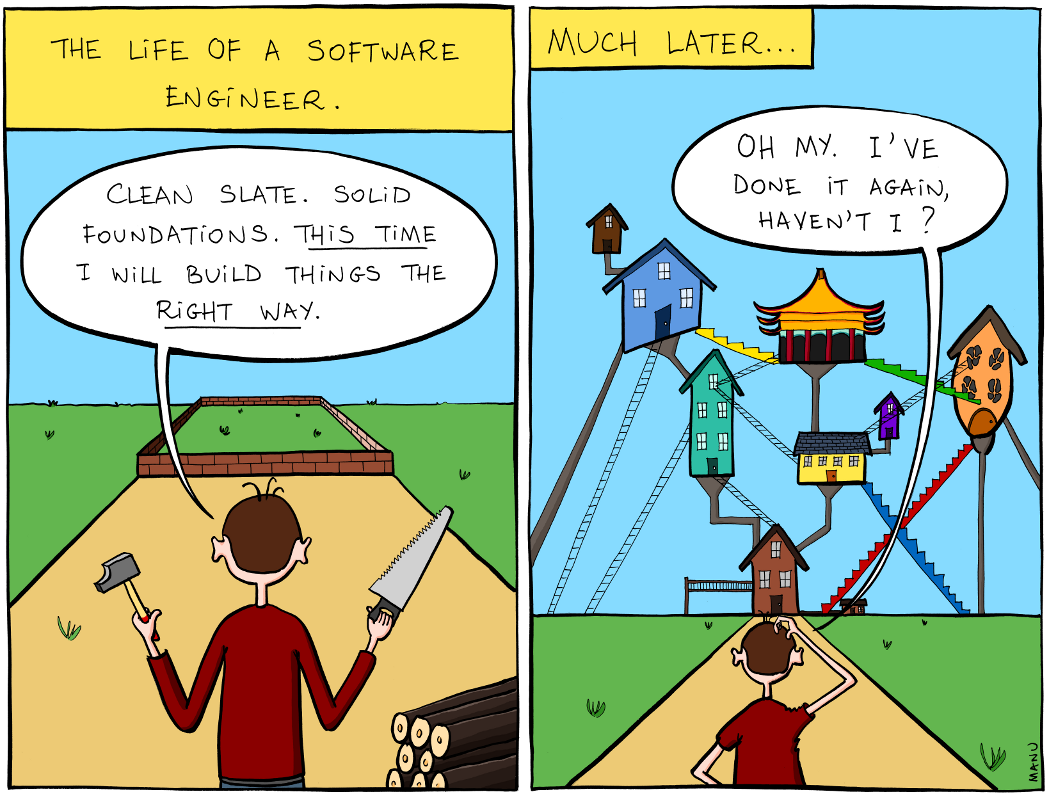
"Life of a software engineer" by Manu Cornet

Emmanuel Cornet (born 21 January 1981) is a French software engineer, freelance cartoonist, writer and musician who worked at Google and Twitter from 2007 until 2021.

== Education ==
Born in Paris, Cornet was educated at the École alsacienne and the Lycée Saint-Louis before studying Informatics, Physics and Maths at the École normale supérieure.

== Career ==
Cornet worked at Google from 2007 until 2021. He joined Twitter in 2021, but said he had been laid off in 2022 shortly after the acquisition of Twitter by Elon Musk.

=== Cartoonist ===
Cornet is known for his cartoons, some of which were published in The New York Times, Der Spiegel, Mashable, Daring Fireball and Business Insider.

His "Organizational Charts" cartoon was quoted by Satya Nadella on the first page of his book, Hit Refresh, as one of the motivations making him want to change the organizational culture at Microsoft.

=== Publications ===
Cornet wrote The Crab and the Lamb, edited by Geneviève Jurgensen and translated into English by Adriana Hunter. It is the first-person account of Cornet's experience with cancer diagnosis and treatment. His second book, Goomics, was published in 2018 and is about his experiences working for Google. His publications include:

- Goomics, volume 1 & 2
- Graphic Nobel, volume 1 & 2
- The Crab and the Lamb
