= The Anomaly (novel) =

2020 novel by Hervé Le Tellier

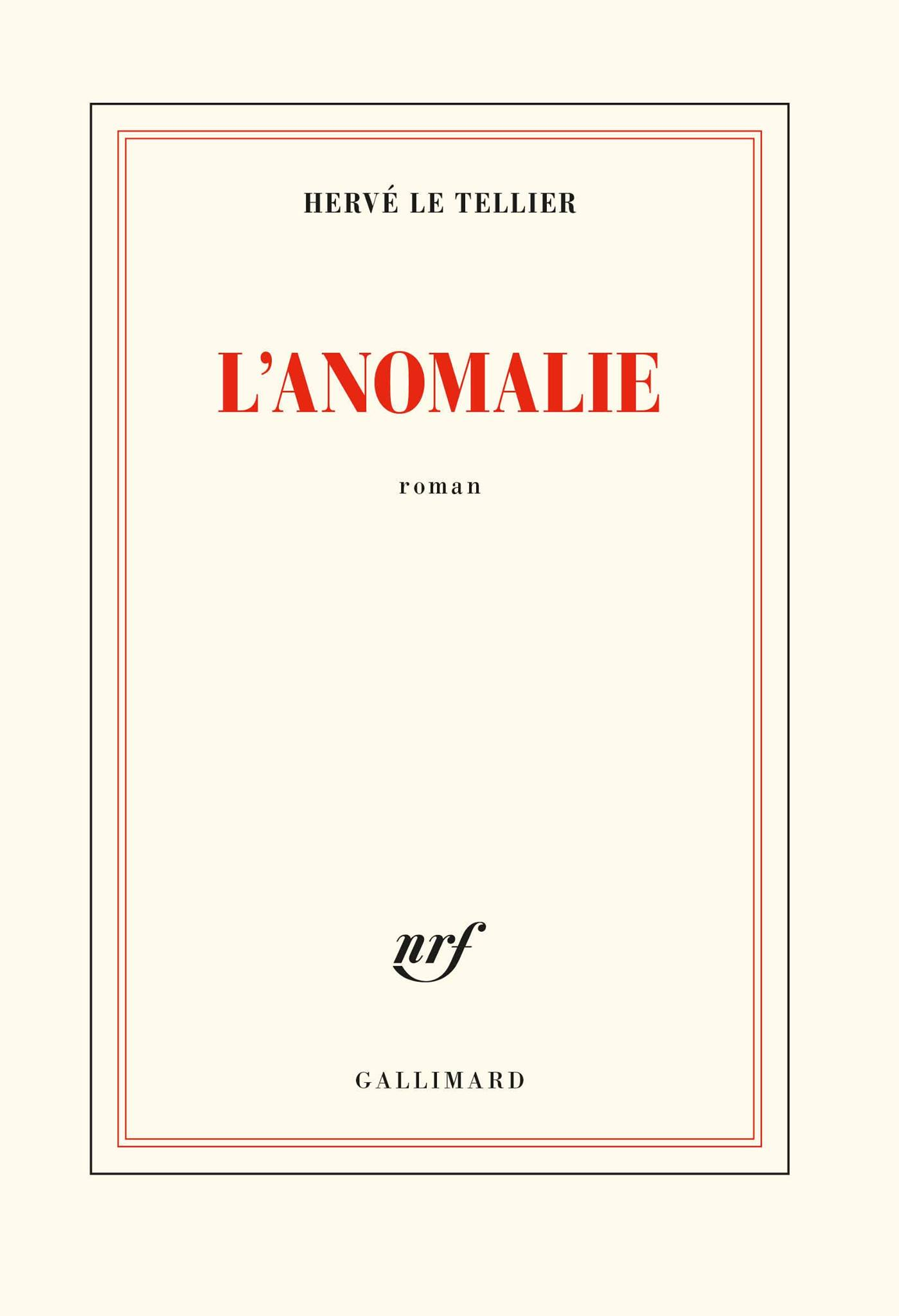
- 2020 Gallimard 'Collection Blanche' edition
- Author: Hervé Le Tellier
- Original title: L'Anomalie
- Translator: Adriana Hunter
- Language: French
- Genre: Science fiction
- Publisher: Éditions Gallimard
- Publication date: 20 August 2020
- Publication place: France
- English publication date: 23 November 2021
- Pages: 336
- Awards: Prix Goncourt (2020)
- ISBN: 978-2-0728-9509-8
- OCLC: 1187223605
- Dewey Decimal: 843/.914
- LC Class: PQ2672.E11455 A86 2020

The Anomaly (French: L'Anomalie) is a 2020 science fiction novel by French writer Hervé Le Tellier. It was published by Éditions Gallimard on 20 August 2020. An English translation by Adriana Hunter was published by Other Press on 23 November 2021.

The novel received positive reviews from the literary press. It received the Prix Goncourt on 30 November 2020.

== Summary ==
An Oulipian work, it is structured around three parts, "As Black as the Sky" (Aussi noir que le ciel), "Life Is a Dream, They Say" (La vie est un songe dit-on), and "Song of Oblivion" (La chanson du néant), whose names are taken from the poetry of Raymond Queneau. The novel asks several questions about the reality of the world and fiction.

On March 10, 2021, Air France Flight 006 from Paris is forced to fly through a cumulonimbus supercell of unprecedented size during a routine landing at John F. Kennedy International Airport. Over the following few months, the passengers from this flight go about their normal lives. Several encounter milestones, such as marriage, pregnancy, breakup, and death.

Among the passengers, Victor Miesel, a writer and translator, abruptly writes a book manuscript titled The anomaly from start to finish, then commits suicide. The posthumous publication of the manuscript garners widespread publicity, recognition, and acclaim for its deceased writer.

On June 24, 2021, an exact duplicate of Air France Flight 006 from March 10, populated by exact duplicates of all passengers and crew on board, appears in the sky over Kennedy Airport and attempts landing. This triggers the United States Department of Defense enacting Protocol 42, a highly unconventional air traffic emergency response protocol, devised by two MIT statistics researchers as an in-joke.

The two MIT alumni are unwittingly requisitioned to supervise the detention of the duplicate passenger jet and passengers by multiple U.S. security agencies, and to lead a forum of scientists to explain this impossible incident. The assembled scientists gradually gravitate towards the incident as evidence for the simulation hypothesis, even as they agonize over its unfalsifiability. Unbeknownst to the public, the Chinese government, having secretively captured a duplicate passenger jet of a different flight, has independently postulated the simulation hypothesis as well.

World governments jointly publicize the duplication of over two hundred human beings, committing substantial expense to providing protection and anonymity for the duplicated persons. The duplicates from the June flight are allowed to meet their counterparts from the March flight, arriving at mutual arrangements for co-existence. Some of these pairs find amicable ways to share the same life, while others experience painful upheavals. The living Miesel steps back into his writing career, his newfound fame giving him a second chance to meet a missed connection.

As media coverage popularizes the simulation hypothesis, apocalypticism rises in the general public. In a televised debate, a philosopher suggests that the duplicated flight was a test to the inhabitants of their simulated reality, while Miesel argues that human behavior will not change as a result. Later, in October 2021, another duplicate of Air France Flight 006 appears, and is destroyed by fighter jets under new procedures replacing Protocol 42. The narrative describes a rippling effect felt all across the world as text gradually disappears from the page, line by line.

== Style ==
Organized like a "novel of novels", L'Anomalie begins with the presentation of several characters, in as many chapters written according to the stylistic codes of different genres, from thriller to the psychological novel, from littérature blanche to the introspective narrative. The reader quickly understands that an event, the "anomaly" of a Paris–New York flight in March 2021, is the link between all these characters.

Annick Geille wrote that Le Tellier seems inspired by the "postmodern science fiction" of the cyberpunk subgenre. The work is structured similarly to that of a television series script. The novel contains many literary allusions.

Le Tellier described the novel as a scoubidou.

== Characters ==
In order of appearance in the novel.

- Blake – Hitman, French, leading a double life.
- Victor Miesel – Unsuccessful writer who committed suicide before publishing his latest novel: L'Anomalie, which developed a cult following. The character was inspired by two dead writers, including Edouard Levé, and two living writers, friends of Le Tellier. Hervé Le Tellier published a portrait of Miesel, illustrated by Frédéric Rébéna, in Libération on 1 August 2021.
- Lucie Bogaert – French film editor. Her relationship with André, an architect thirty years her senior, is dysfunctional.
- David Markle – American airline pilot who suffers from pancreatic cancer that was detected too late.
- Sophia Kleffman – Seven-year-old girl; daughter of a United States soldier serving in Afghanistan and Iraq.
- Joanna Woods – African-American lawyer defending a large pharmaceutical firm.
- Slimboy – Nigerian gay singer, tired of living a lie.
- Adrian Miller – American mathematician of probability, teacher at Princeton University.
- Meredith Harper – British mathematician of topology, teacher at Princeton University.
- Jamy Pudlowski – Agent of the Federal Bureau of Investigation, in charge of Psychological operations (PSYOP).
- André Vannier – French architect, manager of Vannier & Edelman. His relationship with Lucie, who is thirty years younger than him, is threatened.

== Final page ==
The final page of the novel is in the form of a calligram. The last sentence leaves the reader with some work of creative interpretation. The letters, in increasing number, disappear from the page while the width of the lines decreases until there is only one character. It is an invitation to readers to restore an absent text. The first words are easy to guess: "et la tasse à café rouge de mar e I y da la ma de ctor" can be read "et la tasse à café rouge de marque Illy dans la main de Victor Miesel," and the following sentence could be: "et le diamant noir sur la bague d'Anne Vasseur."

The rest of the work is more difficult. Among others, there is the series of letters "u.l.c.é.r.a.t.i.o.n.s.," a reference to the extended heterogrammatic poem "Ulcérations" by Georges Perec, which in 1974 was the first publication of La Bibliothèque oulipienne. The last three letters can be read as forming the word "fin" (English: end) vertically. The five preceding letters—"sable"—indicate another possible meaning: "sable fin" (English: fine sand) evokes the granularity of time. However, if these last lines in the shape of an hourglass provide a key to the novel, it is a deliberately incomplete key. During a round table discussion held on 14 May 2021 at the Maison de la Poésie in Paris, Hervé Le Tellier and nine of the translators of L'anomalie spoke at length about the final page. While confirming the existence of an underlying text, the author refused to make it known, preferring to leave it to readers and translators to reconstruct it.

== Publication and sales ==
On 4 January 2021, the novel reached a circulation of 820,000 copies. On 6 May 2021, a circulation of one million copies was declared by Éditions Gallimard and GfK; this figure constitutes a threshold rarely reached by a Prix Goncourt-winning novel.

According to Challenges, thirty-seven translations were in progress as of January 2021. As of June 2022, the novel had been translated into 45 languages and sold in countries such as the United States, Germany, Japan, but also in Uzbekistan and Estonia.

On 2 June 2022, the novel was published in pocket (poche) format through Gallimard's Folio collection.

An English translation by Adriana Hunter was published by Other Press on 23 November 2021 (ISBN 978-1-63542-169-9).

== Reception ==
Upon its release, the novel was selected to compete for the Prix Goncourt, Prix Renaudot, Prix Médicis, Prix Décembre, Prix du roman Fnac and Prix Wepler. It was awarded the Prix Goncourt on 30 November 2020. The prize was announced through a Zoom video link, the first time in history, due to the COVID-19 pandemic. The prize was also delayed, in solidarity with bookstores that were forced to shut down due to lockdowns.

== Derivative works ==
The writer Pascal Fioretto wrote a pastiche of the novel, entitled L'Anomalie du train 006 de Brive, published by Éditions Herodios in June 2021. Hervé Le Tellier wrote the preface to the book.

=== Television adaptation ===
During an online "literary café" organized by the Escales des Lettres on April 16, 2021, Hervé Le Tellier announced that a television adaptation of the novel is in production.
