= List of Maghrebis =

Listed below are Maghrebis of note.

== Modern ==
=== Musicians ===
- Faouzia Ouihya – Moroccan-Canadian singer-songwriter, born in Casablanca

=== Other notables ===
- Touria Chaoui (1936–1956), first female Maghrebi and Moroccan pilot at the age of fifteen

== Ancient ==
- Shoshenq I, Egyptian Pharaoh of Libyan origin, founder of the Twenty-second dynasty of Egypt.
- Tefnakht, Pharaoh of Libyan origin, who reigned 732–725 BC
- Masinissa, King of Numidia, North Africa, present day Algeria and Tunisia
- Jugurtha, King of Numidia
- Juba II, King of Numidia
- Macrinus, Roman emperor for 14 months in 217 and 218
- Lusius Quietus, governor of Judaea under the emperor Trajan
- Quintus Lollius Urbicus, governor of Britannia from 138 to 144
- Terence, (Publius Terentius Afer), Roman writer
- Apuleius, Roman writer ("half-Numidian, half-Gaetulian")
- Marcus Cornelius Fronto, Roman grammarian, rhetorician and advocate, was born at Cirta in modern Algeria
- Tertullian, an early Christian theologian (born in the highly multiethnic, Phoenician-founded city of Carthage)
- Saint Monica of Hippo, Saint Augustine's mother
- Arius, who proposed the doctrine of Arianism
- Donatus Magnus, leader of the Donatist schism
- Gelasius I between 492 and 496
- Victor I between 186 and 201
- Miltiades between 311 and 314
- Tacfarinas, who fought the Romans in the Aures Mountains,
- Firmus, who fought the Romans Between 372 and 375
- Gildo, who fought the Romans in 398
- Abd ar-Rahman I (731–788), his mother was a Berber.
- Al-Mansur (712–775), his mother was a Berber. Generally regarded as the real founder of the Abbasid Caliphate, his descendants Al-Mahdi, Harun al-Rashid etc. were therefore also partially Berber.
- Tariq ibn Ziyad, one of the leaders of the Moorish conquest of Iberia in 711.
- Adrian of Canterbury, Abbot of St Augustine's Abbey in Canterbury
- Dihya or al-Kahina
- Aksil or Kusayla
- Salih ibn Tarif of the Berghouata
- Abbas Ibn Firnas, inventor and aviator who made the first attempt at controlled flight
- Ibn Tumart, founder of the Almohad dynasty
- Yusuf ibn Tashfin, founder of the Almoravid dynasty
- Ibn Battuta (1304–1377), Moroccan traveller and explorer
- Abu Yaqub Yusuf I, who had the Giralda in Seville built.
- Abu Yaqub Yusuf II, who had the Torre del Oro in Seville built.
- Ziri ibn Manad founder of the Zirid dynasty
- Muhammad Awzal (ca. 1680–1749), prolific Sous Berber poet (see also Ocean of Tears)
- Muhammad al-Jazuli, author of the Dala'il al-Khairat, Sufi
- Abu Ali al-Hassan al-Yusi
- Imam al-Busiri, poet and author of the famous poem Qasida Burda – lived in Alexandria

== People of mixed Maghrebi and European ancestry ==
=== Modern ===
- Cédric Ben Abdallah (Ben) – French humorist, Algerian father and French mother
- Yasmine golotchoglova – French youtubeuse, Russian father and algérian mother
- Robert Abdesselam – French politician and tennis player, Algerian father and French mother
- Ramzi Abid – Canadian professional ice hockey player, Tunisian father and Scottish mother
- Karima Adebibe – English model and actress, Moroccan father and Greek-Irish mother
- Damien Saez – French musicien, Spanish father and algérian mother
- Fu'ad Aït Aattou – French Actor, Moroccan Berber father and French mother
- Isabelle Adjani – French actress, Algerian father and German mother
- Alejandro Agag – Spanish businessman and former politician, Algerian father and Spanish mother
- Laurent Agouazi – Soccer player, Algerian father and French mother
- Natacha Amal – Belgian Actress, Moroccan father and Russian mother
- Amina Allam – Moroccan model, Moroccan father and Finnish mother
- Aure Atika – French actress, French father and Moroccan mother
- Malika Ayane – Italian singer, Moroccan father and Italian mother
- Malika zouhali–worrall – English documentary filmmaker, English father and Moroccan mother
- Jordan Bardella – French politician, President of the National Rally (previously the National Front) since September 2021 (Acting), Algerian great-grandfather
- Samir Barris – Belgian singer, Algerian father and Flemish Belgian mother
- Alain Bashung – French singer, songwriter and actor, Algerian father and French mother
- Kader Belarbi – French choreographer, Algerian father and French mother
- Mehdi Belhaj Kacem – French-Tunisian actor, philosopher, and writer, Tunisia father and French mother
- Catherine Belkhodja – French artist, actress and film director. Algerian father and a French mother
- Jeanne Benameur – French writer, Tunisian father and Italian mother
- Djemila Benhabib – Canadian opponent of Muslim fundamentalism, Algerian father and Cypriot mother
- Malik Bendjelloul – was a Swedish documentary filmmaker, journalist and former child actor. He directed the 2012 documentary Searching for Sugar Man, which won an Academy Award and a BAFTA Award, Algerian father and Swedish mother
- Farouk Bermouga – French actor, Algerian father and French mother
- Big flo et oli – French band, Argentine father and Algerian mother
- Dany Boon – French actor, Algerian father and French mother. Best-paid actor in European film history
- Assaad Bouab – Moroccan actor, Moroccan father and French mother.
- Tarik O'Regan – English musician, Irish father and Algerian mother
- Ali Boulala – Swedish professional skateboarder, Algerian father and Swedish mother
- Josef Boumedienne – Swedish professional hockey defenceman, Algerian father and Finnish mother
- Nina Bouraoui – French writer, Algerian father and French mother
- Daniel Brückner – Soccer player, Algerian father and German mother
- Bushido – German Rapper, Tunisian father and German mother
- Mehdi Carcela-González – Moroccan Soccer player, Spanish father and Moroccan mother
- Samir Carruthers – English Soccer player, Irish-Italian father and Moroccan mother
- Nicolas Cazalé – French actor, French father and Algerian mother
- Liassine Cadamuro – French footballer, Italian father and Algerian mother
- Sara Chafak – Finnish beauty pageant titleholder, Moroccan father and Finnish mother
- Manuel da Costa – Soccer player, Portuguese father and Moroccan mother
- Gérald Darmanin – Minister of the Interior since 2020, Algerian grandfather
- Jean-Baptiste Djebbari – Minister for Transport, Algerian great-grandfather
- Sofia Essaidi – Moroccan French singer, Moroccan father and French mother
- Michaël Fabre – French Soccer player, Algerian father and French mother
- Adrien Gallo – French musician and actor, French father and Algerian mother
- Julien Gerbi – French race car driver, Tunisian/French father and Algerian mother
- Mehdi El Glaoui – French actor, Moroccan father and French mother
- Brice Guilbert – French singer, French father and Moroccan mother
- Karim Hendou – Algerian Soccer player, Algerian father and Ukrainian mother
- Hédi Kaddour – French writer, Tunisian father and French mother
- Hakim El Karoui – French politician, Tunisian father and French mother
- Saïd El Khadraoui – Belgian politician, Moroccan father and Flemish Belgian mother
- Sami Khedira – German football player, Tunisian father and German mother
- Rani Khedira – German football player, Tunisian father and German mother
- Jonas Hassen Khemiri – Swedish novelist, Tunisian father and Swedish mother
- Marina Kaye – French singer, French father and Algerian mother
- Reem Kherici – French actress, Tunisian father and Italian mother
- Myriam El Khomri – current French Minister of Labour (2016), Moroccan father and French mother
- Taïg Khris – French inline skater, Algerian father and Greek mother
- Simone Lahbib – Scottish actress, Algerian father and Scottish mother
- Mehdi Lacen – French Soccer player, Algerian father and Italian mother
- Hind Laroussi Tahiri – Dutch singer, Moroccan father and Dutch mother
- Maïwenn Le Besco and Isild Le Besco – French actress, Algerian grandfather
- Amine Lecomte – Soccer player, French father and Moroccan mother
- Jalil Lespert – French actor, French father and Algerian mother
- Sheryfa Luna – French singer, Algerian father and French mother
- Ali Magoudi – French psychoanalyst and writer, Algerian father and Polish mother
- Yannis Marshall – French dancer, English father and Algerian mother
- Florian Makhedjouf – Soccer player, Algerian father and Italian mother
- Elyas M’Barek – German Actor, Tunisian father and German mother
- Carl Medjani – French Soccer player, Algerian father and French mother
- Mourad Meghni – French footballer, Algerian father and Portuguese mother
- Kad Merad – French actor, Algerian father and French mother
- Maxime Mermoz – French Rugby player, French father and Algerian mother
- MC Rene – German rapper, Moroccan father and German mother
- Arnaud Montebourg – French politician, Algerian grandfather, France's Minister of Industrial Renewal
- Mehdi Mostefa – French Soccer player, Algerian father and French mother
- Marcel Mouloudji – French singer and actor, Algerian father and French mother
- Cyril Mourali – French actor, Tunisian father and French mother
- Chazia Mourali – Dutch TV presenter, Tunisian father and Dutch mother
- Kerim Mrabti – Swedish Soccer player, Tunisian father and Swedish-Finnish mother
- Lee Lamrani Ibrahim "Lightning" Murray – British-Moroccan cage fighter turned gangster, Moroccan father and English mother
- Samy Naceri – French actor, Algerian father and French mother
- Mehdi Nebbou – French actor, Algerian father and German mother
- Marie-José Nat – French actress, Algerian father and French mother
- Malika Nedir – Swiss TV presenter, Algerian father and Swiss mother
- Juliette Noureddine – French singer, Algerian grandfather
- Laurette Onkelinx – Belgian politician, Belgian father and Algerian mother
- Artur Partyka – Polish high jumper, Algerian father and Polish mother
- Pnl – French band, Corsica father and Algerian mother
- Édith Piaf – French singer, Moroccan great-grandfather
- Jérome Polenz – Soccer player, Algerian father and German mother
- Daniel Prévost – French comedian, Algerian father and French mother
- Karim Rekik – Dutch football player, Tunisian father and Dutch mother
- Damien Saez – French singer, Spanish father and Algerian mother
- Leila Sebbar – French writer, Algerian father and French mother
- Adam Sioui – Canadian college and international swimmer, Algerian father and Canadian mother
- Myriam Sif – Moroccan singer, Moroccan father and Hungarian mother
- Hedi Slimane – French fashion designer, Tunisian father and Italian mother
- Benjamin Stambouli – Soccer player, Algerian father and French mother
- Jacques Villeret – French actor, Algerian father and French mother
- Najat Vallaud-Belkacem – first French woman to be appointed Minister of Education, Higher Education, and Research on 25 August 2014, Moroccan father and Spanish grandmother
- Karim Ziani – French footballer, Algerian Algerian father and French mother
- Enzo Zidane (1995-), Luca Zidane (1998-), Elyaz Zidane (2005-) - Soccer players, Algerian father
- Claude Zidi – French film director, Algerian father and French mother
- Malik Zidi – French actor, Algerian father and French mother
- Kenza Zouiten – Swedish fashion blogger, Moroccan father and Swedish mother

Maxime Mermoz- French father and algérian mother

=== Ancient ===
- Septimius Severus, Roman Emperor who reigned from 14 April 193 until his death in 211
- Augustine of Hippo, Latin Church Father, one of the most important figures in the development of Western Christianity
- Abd-ar-Rahman III, Emir and Caliph of Córdoba (912–961) of the Umayyad dynasty in al-Andalus

== People of mixed Maghrebi and Asian ancestry ==
- Erika Sawajiri – Japan-based actress, model, and musician. Japanese father and an Algerian Berber mother
- Maïwenn Le Besco and Isild Le Besco – French actress, Algerian grandfather, Vietnamese grandfather

== See also ==
- Maghrebis
