= Agnès Desarthe =

French writer

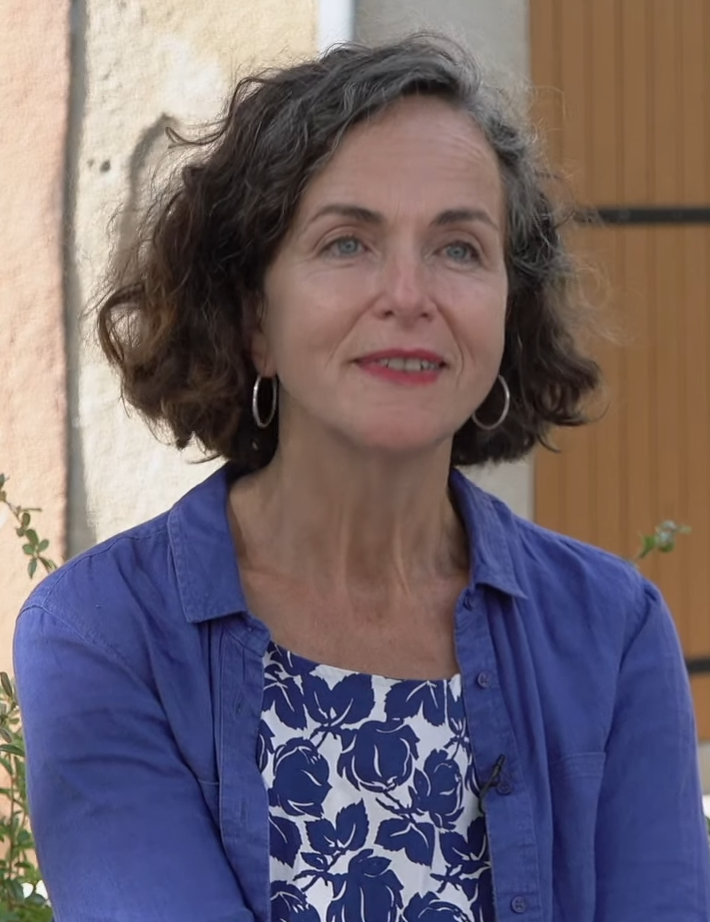
- Agnès Desarthe in 2021
- Born: Agnès Naouri; 3 May 1966 (age 60); Paris, France
- Occupations: Novelist; children's writer; translator
- Spouse: Dante Desarthe
- Children: 4
- Relatives: Laurent Naouri (brother)
- Writing career
- Language: French
- Years active: 1990–present
- Notable awards: Prix du Livre Inter (1996); Prix Renaudot des lycéens (2010)
- Website: www.agnesdesarthe.com

Agnès Desarthe (née Naouri; born 3 May 1966) is a French novelist, children's writer and translator.

== Biography ==
Desarthe was born on 3 May 1966 in Paris. She is the daughter of the pediatrician and writer Aldo Naouri. She is married to filmmaker Dante Desarthe, son of actor Gérard Desarthe. They have four children. Her brother is the opera singer Laurent Naouri. She studied English literature.

She started her career as a translator. In 1992, she published her first novel. She became a prolific writer of children's books. In 1996 she was awarded the Prix du Livre Inter for her second novel Un secret sans importance. Her most successful novel, Chez Moi (French: Mangez-moi), has been translated into over 15 languages. One of her more recent novels, Dans la nuit brune, received the Prix Renaudot des lycéens in 2010. Her novels are published in France by Éditions de l'Olivier and in the UK by Portobello Books.

== Awards and honours ==
- 1996: Prix du Livre Inter for Un secret sans importance
- 2007: Prix Maurice-Edgar Coindreau for Les papiers de Puttermesser (translation of The Puttermesser Papers by Cynthia Ozick)
- 2007: Prix Laure Bataillon for Les papiers de Puttermesser (translation of The Puttermesser Papers by Cynthia Ozick)
- 2009: Prix Marcel Pagnol for Le Remplaçant
- 2009: Prix du roman Version Femina - Virgin Megastore for Le Remplaçant
- 2010: Prix Renaudot des lycéens for Dans la nuit brune
- 2012: Prix littéraire 30 millions d'amis (a.k.a. Goncourt des animaux) for Une partie de chasse
- 2014: Prix Anna-de-Noailles of the Académie Française for Comment j'ai appris à lire
- 2015: Prix littéraire du Monde for Ce cœur changeant
- 2015: Chevalier of the Legion of Honour

=== Nominations ===
- 2002: Independent Foreign Fiction Prize shortlist for Five Photos of My Wife
- 2002: Jewish Quarterly-Wingate Prize shortlist for Five Photos of My Wife
- 2003: International Dublin Literary Award longlist for Five Photos of My Wife
- 2021: Prix Goncourt second selection for L'éternel fiancé

== Bibliography ==
=== Novels ===
- Quelques minutes de bonheur absolu. Éditions de l'Olivier. 1993
- Un secret sans importance. Éditions de l'Olivier. 1996
- Cinq photos de ma femme. Éditions de l'Olivier. 1998
  - Five Photos of My Wife. Translated by Hunter, Adriana. Flamingo. 2001. ISBN 978-0-00-710091-0.
- Les bonnes intentions. Éditions de l'Olivier. 2000
  - Good Intentions. Translated by Hunter, Adriana. Flamingo. 2002. ISBN 978-0-00-710093-4.
- Le principe de Frédelle. Éditions de l'Olivier. 2003
- Mangez-moi. Éditions de l'Olivier. 2006
  - Chez Moi. Translated by Hunter, Adriana. Portobello Books. 2009. ISBN 978-1-84627-102-1.
- Le Remplaçant. Éditions de l'Olivier. 2009
- Dans la nuit brune. Éditions de l'Olivier. 2010
  - The Foundling. Translated by Hunter, Adriana. Portobello Books. 2012. ISBN 978-1-84627-411-4.
- Une partie de chasse. Éditions de l'Olivier. 2012
  - Hunting Party. Translated by Hills, Christiana. Unnamed Press. 2018. ISBN 978-1-94470-071-3.
- Ce cœur changeant. Éditions de l'Olivier. 2015
- La Chance de leur vie. Éditions de l'Olivier. 2018
- L'éternel fiancé. Éditions de l'Olivier. 2021
- Le Château des Rentiers. Éditions de l'Olivier. 2023
- L'Oreille Absolue. Éditions de l'Olivier. 2025
- Qui se ressemble. Éditions Libella. 2026

==== Children's novels ====
- Je ne t'aime pas, Paulus. L'École des loisirs. 1992
- Abo, le minable homme des neiges.illustrations by Claude Boujon. L'École des loisirs. 1992
- Les Peurs de Conception. L'École des loisirs. 1992
- La Fête des pères. L'École des loisirs. 1992
- Le Mariage de Simon. illustrations by Anaïs Vaugelade. L'École des loisirs. 1992
- Le Roi Ferdinand. L'École des loisirs. 1992
- Dur de dur. L'École des loisirs. 1993
- La Femme du bouc émissaire. illustrations by Willi Glasauer. L'École des loisirs. 1993
- Benjamin, héros solitaire. L'École des loisirs. 1994
- Tout ce qu'on ne dit pas. L'École des loisirs. 1995
- Poète maudit. L'École des loisirs. 1995
- L'Expédition. illustrations by Willi Glasauer. L'École des loisirs. 1995
- Je manque d'assurance. L'École des loisirs. 1997
- Les pieds de Philomène. illustrations by Anaïs Vaugelade. L'École des loisirs. 1997
- Les grandes questions. L'École des loisirs. 1999
- Les trois vœux de l'archiduchesse. illustrations by Anaïs Vaugelade. L'École des loisirs. 2000
- Petit prince Pouf. illustrations by Claude Ponti. L'École des loisirs. 2002
- Le monde d'à-côté. L'École des loisirs. 2002
- À deux c'est mieux. L'École des loisirs. 2004
- Comment j'ai changé ma vie. L'École des loisirs. 2004
- Igor le labrador. illustrations by Anaïs Vaugelade. L'École des loisirs. 2004
- C'est qui le plus beau ?. illustrations by Anaïs Vaugelade. L'École des loisirs. 2005
- Je ne t'aime toujours pas, Paulus. L'École des loisirs. 2005
- Les frères chats. illustrations by Anaïs Vaugelade. L'École des loisirs. 2005
- La Cinquième saison. L'École des loisirs. 2006
- Je veux être un cheval. illustrations by Anaïs Vaugelade. L'École des loisirs. 2006
- L'histoire des Carnets de Lineke. L'École de Loisirs. 2007
- La plus belle fille du monde. L'École de Loisirs. 2009
- Mission impossible. illustrations by Anaïs Vaugelade. L'École des loisirs. 2009
- Dingo et le sens de la vie. illustrations by Anaïs Vaugelade. L'École des loisirs. 2012
- Le Poulet fermier. illustrations by Anaïs Vaugelade. L'École des loisirs. 2013
- Mes animaux (anthology). illustrations by Anaïs Vaugelade. L'École des loisirs. 2014

=== Short fiction ===
- "Il ne se passe jamais rien ici". La Rencontre (anthology). Paris: Éditions Prisma. 2010. ISBN 978-2-8104-0119-2. OCLC 777928294.
- Ce qui est arrivé aux Kempinski (short story collection). Éditions de l'Olivier. 2014. ISBN 978-2-8236-0416-0.

=== Plays ===
- Les Chevaliers
- Le Kit

=== Nonfiction ===
- V.W. Le mélange des genres. co-written with Geneviève Brisac. Éditions de l'Olivier. 2004; book about Virginia Woolf
- Lois Lowry. L'École des loisirs. 2011; children's book about Lois Lowry
- Comment j'ai appris à lire. Éditions Stock. 2013
- Le roi René. Éditions Odile Jacob. 2016; biography of René Urtreger
- Maurice Sendak. co-written with Béatrice Michielsen and Bernard Noël. L'École des loisirs. 2016; children's book about Maurice Sendak

=== Prefaces ===
- Virginia Woolf. Journal intégral, 1915-1941. collection La Cosmopolite. Éditions Stock. 2008; translated by Marie-Ange Dutartre and Colette-Marie Huet ISBN 978-2-234-06030-2

=== Translations ===
- Aimee Bender: L'ombre de moi-même. Éditions de l'Olivier. 2001
- Aimee Bender: Des créatures obstinées. Éditions de l'Olivier. 2007
- Alice Thomas Ellis: Les habits neufs de Margaret. Éditions de l'Olivier. 1993
- Alice Thomas Ellis: Les ivresses de Madame Monro. Éditions de l'Olivier. 1993
- Alice Thomas Ellis: Les égarements de Lili. Éditions de l'Olivier. 1994
- Alice Thomas Ellis: Les oiseaux du ciel. Éditions de l'Olivier. 1995
- Anne Fine: Le jeu des sept familles. L'École des loisirs. 1995
- Anne Fine: Comment écrire comme un cochon. L'École des loisirs. 1997
- Anne Fine: Billy le transi. L'École des loisirs. 2006
- Jean Fritz: La longue marche: Les 9000 kilomètres qui ont amené Mao au pouvoir. L'École des loisirs. 1990
- Mary Downing Hahn: La saison des méduses. L'École des loisirs. 1996
- Polly Horvath: Une fille intrépide. L'École des loisirs. 2010
- M.E. Kerr: Est-ce bien vous, Miss Blue ?. L'École des loisirs. 1990
- Tony Kushner: Brundibar. illustrations by Maurice Sendak. L'École des loisirs. 2005
- Elena Lappin: La marche nuptiale. Éditions de l'Olivier. 2000
- Elena Lappin: Le nez. Éditions de l'Olivier. 2002
- Gail Carson Levine: Belle comme le jour. L'École des loisirs. 2008
- Leo Lionni: Monsieur MacSouris. L'École des loisirs. 1993
- Lois Lowry: Anastasia, demande à ton psy !. L'École des loisirs. 1990
- Lois Lowry: Compte les étoiles. L'École des loisirs. 1990
- Lois Lowry: Anastasia, à votre service. L'École des loisirs. 1991
- Lois Lowry: La centième chose que j'aime chez toi, Caroline. L'École des loisirs. 1991
- Lois Lowry: Le passeur. L'École des loisirs. 1994
- Lois Lowry: Anastasia Krupnick. L'École des loisirs. 1996
- Lois Lowry: C'est encore Anastasia. L'École des loisirs. 1997
- Lois Lowry: Anastasia connaît la réponse. L'École des loisirs. 1999
- Lois Lowry: Toute la vérité sur Sam. L'École des loisirs. 1999
- Lois Lowry: Anastasia avec conviction. L'École des loisirs. 2002
- Lois Lowry: Le nom de code d'Anastasia. L'École des loisirs. 2004
- Lois Lowry: Messager. L'École des loisirs. 2004
- Lois Lowry: Une carrière de rêve pour Anastasia . L'École des loisirs. 2005
- Lois Lowry: Le bal d'anniversaire. L'École des loisirs. 2011
- Betty MacDonald: Madame Bigote-Gigote. L'École des loisirs. 1991
- Betty MacDonald: Madame Bigote-Gigote a plus d'un tour dans son sac. L'École des loisirs. 1991
- Patricia MacLachlan: Nous sommes tous sa famille. L'École des loisirs. 1994
- James Marshall: Pieds de cochons. illustrations by Maurice Sendak. L'École des loisirs. 2001
- Jay McInerney: La belle vie. Éditions de l'Olivier. 2007
- Jay McInerney: Moi tout craché. Éditions de l'Olivier. 2009
- Alice Munro: Un peu, beaucoup, passionnément, à la folie, pas du tout. Éditions Points. 2019
- Anaïs Nin: L'intemporalité perdue et autres nouvelles. NiL. 2020
- Cynthia Ozick: Les papiers de Puttermesser. Éditions de l'Olivier. 2007
- Cynthia Ozick: Corps étrangers. Éditions de l'Olivier. 2012
- Louise Plummer: Je m'appelle Susan. L'École des loisirs. 1993
- Chaim Potok: L'arbre du ciel. L'École des loisirs. 2000
- Chaim Potok: Le Roi du ciel. L'École des loisirs. 2001
- Peggy Rathmann: À quatre pattes les bébés sont partis. L'École des loisirs. 2005
- Peggy Rathmann: L'agent Boucle et Gloria. L'École des loisirs. 2005
- Emma Richler: Sœur folie. Éditions de l'Olivier. 2004
- Louis Sachar: Pas à pas. L'École des loisirs. 2006
- Philippe Sands: La Dernière Colonie. Éditions Albin Michel. 2022.
- Allen Say: Allison. L'École des loisirs. 1998
- Allen Say: Le bonhomme Kamashibai. L'École des loisirs. 2006
- Ann Herbert Scott: Sur les genoux de maman. L'École des loisirs. 1993
- Maurice Sendak: Mini-bibliothèque. L'École des loisirs. 2010
- Peter Spier: Cirque Mariano. L'École des loisirs. 1992.
- Chris Van Allsburg: Le balai magique. L'École des loisirs. 1993
- Ellen Weiss: Le Pôle-Express : Un voyage au pays du Père Noël. L'École des loisirs. 2004
- Virginia Woolf: La maison de Carlyle et autres esquisses. Mercure de France. 2004
