= Suicide (novel) =

2008 novel by Edouard Levé

- English edition
- Author: Édouard Levé
- Translator: Jan Steyn
- Language: French
- Publisher: Gallimard (French); Dalkey Archive Press (English)
- Publication date: 2008
- Publication place: France
- English publication date: March 2010
- Media type: Print
- Pages: 128
- ISBN: 978-1-56478-628-9

Suicide is a short novel by Édouard Levé noted for its precise language and seemingly random structure meant to imitate human memory.

An excerpt of Suicide titled Life in Three Houses appeared in the April 2011 issue of Harper's.

== Plot ==
The work's prose is a second person narration detailing disconnected episodes about "you", the narrator's friend that committed suicide some twenty years before. The descriptions are never more than a few paragraphs long. They culminate and characterize "you".

After the main body of the work (the prose), there are pages of verse that "your wife" found in "your desk drawer". They are written in first person with the word "me" ending almost every line of each tercet in the English translation.

== Major themes ==
One of the work's major themes is the coherence of a human life. The narrator and "you" see human life as an absurd collection of meaningless events, but "your" suicide gives previously meaningless actions meaning. "Your" suicide organizes "your" life into a coherent narrative. The narrator claims that "your" suicide has actually become the beginning of "your" life story. The book, fittingly, begins by recounting "your" suicide.

== Levé's suicide ==
Much of the analysis and interpretation of Suicide hinges on the fact that ten days after giving the text to his publisher, Levé hanged himself. The book has been interpreted as autobiographical. It has also been viewed as an internal dialogue between the two sides of Levé ("you" and "I").

Throughout the work, Levé ensures "your" motivations for committing suicide are unknown to the narrator and, consequently, the reader. In the book, "you" leave open a comic book to a two-page spread as an explanation of "your" suicide. But, when "your wife" sees "you" dead, she knocks over the comic book. Nobody knows which page "you" thought explained "your" suicide.

Contrastingly, Levé is said to have left a suicide note. Some reviewers say these differences between the book and Levé's own life were meant to separate the book from Levé's own act.
