= Josiah S. Carberry =

Fictional professor, used in jokes

Josiah Stinkney Carberry is a fictional professor, created as a joke in 1929. He is said to still teach at Brown University, and to be known for his work in "psychoceramics", the supposed study of "cracked pots" (a play on words of the term crackpot).

== History ==
The joke originated when Classics professor John William Spaeth Jr. (1895–1973), posted a false notice for a Carberry lecture on a bulletin board at Brown on January 24, 1929. The lecture's title was "Archaic Greek Architectural Revetments in Connection with Ionian Philology"; when asked to elaborate, Spaeth provided fictional details about the professor's family and academic interests.

According to legend, Carberry pursued his bachelor's degree at the University of Chicago followed by his PhD at Harvard University. On completing his education, he joined Brown University as a professor of Psychoceramics. Since then, Carberry has traditionally been scheduled to lecture every Friday the 13th and February 29 at Brown, and a general mythology has grown around him and his family. Jars, many of them cracked pots, are placed in many of the administrative buildings as well as the libraries and students can donate change to Professor Carberry on these days. Students have inserted references to him in otherwise serious journals, as any such reference which fails to point out his non-existence undermines the reputation of those works. Legal philosopher Joel Feinberg, whose teaching career began with a two-year stint at Brown, carried on a long and apparently furious feud with Carberry in the acknowledgement sections of his many books. Carberry was also known at Wesleyan University in Middletown, Connecticut, from about 1930, when Spaeth moved from Brown University to join the Wesleyan faculty.

== Traditions ==
Each Friday the 13th and leap day is "Josiah Carberry Day" at Brown. The year of Brown's founding, 1764, was a leap year starting on Sunday. Only these years and common years beginning on Thursday have three occurrences of Friday the 13th.

Often lectures are scheduled where Carberry fails to show up, and cracked pots are put outside the libraries for donations to the Josiah S. Carberry Fund, which Carberry set up "in memory of my future late wife, Laura," for the purchase of books "of which I might or might not approve." The bookplate bears a calendar for February with Friday the 13th and Sunday the 29th printed in red. This month only occurs in a leap year starting on Thursday, such as 1976, 2004, and 2032. Below this is the Latin motto "Dulce et Decorum Est Desipere in Loco", which translates as "It is pleasant and proper to be foolish once in a while."

Named after Carberry are a snack bar at Brown (Josiah's or Jo's for short) where they serve sandwiches known as "carberrys" and the library's card catalog (Josiah). Carberry also writes letters to The Brown Daily Herald, Brown's student newspaper, published in the April Fool's Day issue. A Brown-affiliated student housing cooperative (Carberry House) took his name from 1970 until its closure in 1998. Professor Carberry also appeared in an American Express commercial in the 1970s. Additionally, the documentation for logging into password-protected areas of the Brown University website often uses "jcarberr" as the example username.

On October 3, 1991, at the First Annual Ig Nobel Prize Ceremony, Carberry was awarded an Ig Nobel Prize for Interdisciplinary Research, making him one of three fictional winners. He was commended as a "bold explorer and eclectic seeker of knowledge, for his pioneering work in the field of psychoceramics, the study of cracked pots."

According to Martha Mitchell's Encyclopedia Brunoniana, "On Friday, May 13, 1955, an anonymous gift of $101.01 (Note: equivalent to $1,214 in 2025) was received by the University from Professor Carberry to establish the Josiah S. Carberry Fund in memory of his 'future late wife.' A condition of the gift was that, henceforth, every Friday the 13th would be designated 'Carberry Day,' and on that day friends of the University would deposit their loose change in brown jugs to augment the fund, which is used to purchase 'such books as Professor Carberry might or might not approve of.' Students have followed this tradition ever since, and 275 books had been purchased with the proceeds, as of April 2018.

Professor Carberry has been the subject of articles in a number of periodicals, including The New York Times, which proclaimed him 'The World's Greatest Traveler' on the front page of its Sunday travel section in 1974, and in Yankee magazine, where he was 'The Absent-Bodied Professor' in 1975.

== Fictional assistant ==
Carberry's assistant is a man referred to as Truman Grayson, who has the unfortunate habit, wherever he and Carberry travel, of being bitten by something that begins with the letter "A".

== Publications under the name of J. S. Carberry ==
- Carberry, Josiah S. (October 1, 1934). "Another Catullus to Another Lesbia". The Classical Weekly. 28: 23. ProQuest 1296357038.
- Quinn, John J.; Carberry, Josiah S. (1987). "Bulk and Surface Plasmons in Artificially Structured Materials". IEEE Transactions on Plasma Science. 15 (4): 394–410. Bibcode:1987ITPS...15..394Q. doi:10.1109/TPS.1987.4316723. S2CID 41071176.
- Carberry, Josiah (January 1, 2006). "The only thing worse than yet one more bad trilogy". In Di Filippo, Paul (ed.). Plumage from Pegasus. Wildside Press. pp. 75–82. ISBN 978-0-8095-5610-6.; his position and institutional affiliation are given as "Professor of English, Brown University at San Diego", and the paper is claimed to be a reprint from The Journal of Popular Culture. The editor, Paul Di Filippo, is a resident of Providence, Rhode Island, where Brown University is located.
- Carberry, Josiah S. 2013. Paradigm shifts in assessing crackpot methodologies. Brown University Studies in the Humanities 13: 1–13. Cited in "Comparing methods of collecting proverbs: Learning to value working with a community", Peter Unseth, 2014, GIALens 8.3.
- Crossref publishes example papers under the name Josiah Carberry to demonstrate metadata. One such example is "Toward a Unified Theory of High-Energy Metaphysics: Silly String Theory"
- Carberry, Josiah. "The Global State of Psychoceramics Research". Annals of Psychoceramics B. ISSN 5555-5152. OCLC 5127210589.
- Carberry, Josiah. "Toward a Unified Theory of High-Energy Metaphysics: Silly String Theory". Journal of Psychoceramics. 5 (11). OCLC 4824578670.
- Carberry, Josiah. "Dog: A Methodology for the Development of Simulated Annealing". Journal of Psychoceramics. 5 (11). OCLC 4938249934.
- A letter purportedly authored by Professor Carberry was published in the British Medical Journal in 2016, in response to an article published in the same journal concerning the sugar content of children's fruit drinks.
- Carberry has a demonstration account used in training examples by the standard ORCID authority control system, Crossref and others to demonstrate interoperation among scholarly communication systems without relying on the uniqueness of a name. He is assigned ORCID 0000-0002-1825-0097.
- Carberry, Josiah S. "Cracked - Notes Toward a Fragile Epistemology". AK&KZ Publishing.

== See also ==
- List of Ig Nobel Prize winners
- List of practical joke topics
- Jean-Baptiste Botul, a fictional French philosopher
