= Ali Magoudi =

French psychoanalyst and writer

Ali Magoudi (born 4 January 1948 in Paris) is a French psychoanalyst and writer, born of an Algerian father and a Polish mother, raised in the French language.

He was awarded the "Prix Botul" in 2005.

== Bibliography ==
- 1986: Approche psychanalytique des toxicomanes, with Caroline Ferbos, PUF
- 1986: François Mitterrand. Portrait total, with Pierre Jouve, Carrère
- 1987: Jacques Chirac. Portrait total, with Pierre Jouve, Carrère
- 1987: Comment choisir son psychanalyste, under the pseudonym Oreste Saint-Drôme, Éditions du Seuil, series "Point-virgule" #48
- 1988: Comment se débarrasser de son psychanalyste. 15 scénarios possibles, plus un, under the pseudonym Oreste Saint-Drôme, Le Seuil, "Point-virgule" #59
- 1988: Les Dits et les non-dits de Jean-Marie Le Pen. Enquête et psychanalyse, with Pierre Jouve, La Découverte
- 1989: Le Ronfleur apprivoisé. Petite encyclopédie pratique à l'usage des ronchopates et de leurs victimes, under the pseudonym Oreste Saint-Drôme, Le Seuil, 1989
- 1995: Comment cultiver son petit écolier, under the pseudonym Oreste Saint-Drôme, La Découverte, 1990, 2001; L.G.F., #13827
- 1992: Quand l’homme civilise le temps, La Découverte
- 1992: Comment se débarrasser de ses parents… sans crime, ni châtiment, under the pseudonym Oreste Saint-Drôme, La Découverte
- 1989: Dictionnaire inespéré de 55 termes visités par Jacques Lacan, under the pseudonym Oreste Saint-Drôme, Le Seuil
- 1996: La Lettre fantôme, Éditions de Minuit
- 2000: Comment choisir son psychanalyste, with Frédéric Pagès, under the pseudonym Oreste Saint-Drôme, La Découverte
- 1999: Manifeste pour une Europe souveraine, with Jérôme Monod, Éditions Odile Jacob
- 2004: Le Monde d’Ali. Comment fait-on une psychanalyse quand on est Polonais, chirurgien, arabe, élevé dans le Sentier, Albin Michel
- 2005: Les Rendez-vous. La psychanalyse de François Mitterrand, Maren Sell
- 2009: J'vais vous dire un truc... : Les plus belles déclarations de Nicolas Sarkozy, La Découverte
- 2011: Un sujet français, Albin Michel
