= Jean-Baptiste Botul =

Fictional French philosopher

Jean-Baptiste Botul is a fictional French philosopher created in 1995 by the journalist Frédéric Pagès and other members of a group calling itself the Association of the Friends of Jean-Baptiste Botul. Originating as a literary hoax, the names of both Botul and his philosophy of botulism derive from botulism, an illness caused by the bacterium Clostridium botulinum, and ultimately from the Latin word botulus, meaning 'sausage'. References to Botul were first made in publications by members of the association and later turned up in texts by writers who were not party to the hoax and thought Botul was a real person, notably the French philosopher Bernard-Henri Lévy. There is now an annual Botul Prize awarded for a book that mentions Botul.

== History ==
The hoax began in 1995, when Frédéric Pagès, a journalist for the satirical weekly newspaper Le Canard enchaîné (The Chained Duck) and a former professor of philosophy, invented Jean-Baptiste Botul and his chief work, entitled The Sexual Life of Immanuel Kant. The general idea behind Botul and botulism was that philosophy is too vital to be left solely in the hands of professional philosophers.

Various authors afterwards referred to this work—some facetiously and some seriously—including the philosopher and TV personality Bernard-Henri Lévy, who quoted from it extensively in his 2010 book On War in Philosophy. Lévy afterwards acknowledged that he had fallen for the "well-rigged" hoax.

== Fictional biography ==
Pagès created a fictitious history for Botul, as follows: Botul was supposedly born on August 15, 1896, in the French village of Lairière in the south-central Aude department. Affiliating himself with the oral tradition in philosophy, he left no official writings; instead, what is known of his thought comes from transcribed speeches and fragments of correspondence. He is said to have been a friend of the writer Marcel Proust and to have been engaged for a time to the politician and former spy Marthe Richard. Other famous people placed in his orbit include the writers Simone de Beauvoir, Lou Andreas-Salomé, Marie Bonaparte, Jean Cocteau, Jean Giraudoux, Stefan Zweig, and Andre Malraux, and the Mexican revolutionaries Pancho Villa and Emiliano Zapata. In 1946 he supposedly emigrated to Paraguay with a hundred German families fleeing the advancing Soviet armies, and there he is said to have founded a town, 'Nueva Königsberg', governed by the principles of Kantian philosophy. His death date is given as August 15, 1947.

In his philosophical work, Botul is presented as an expert in the work of Immanuel Kant, with special attention to Kantian morality.

=== Fictional works ===
- The Sexual Life of Immanuel Kant
- Landru: Precursor of Feminism: The Unpublished Correspondence Between Henri Désiré Landru and Jean-Baptiste Botul
- Nietzsche and the Noonday Demon
- Soft Metaphysics
- Hole in All: Correspondence to Myself

== Association of the Friends of Jean-Baptiste Botul ==
The Association of the Friends of Jean-Baptiste Botul was founded in 1995, at the same time as Botul himself, and its founders include Pagès, writers Hervé Le Tellier and Jacques Gaillard, actor Patrice Minet, economist Bertrand Rothé, and Emmanuel Brouillard, who holds the title of curator of the Botul Museum. The association's founders are also known as the core botulien (Botulian core) and the NoDuBo (Noyau Dur Botulien, Botulian hard core).

The association contributes to the creation of Botul's oeuvre. This includes most prominently The Sexual Life of Immanuel Kant as well as Nietzsche and the Noonday Demon; Landru: The Precursor of Feminism; and Soft Metaphysics. The first two of these have since been published by the French press Éditions Mille et une nuits.

The association also organizes various annual events, including a banquet. Association members all sit on the jury that is responsible for awarding the annual Botul Prize.

== Botul Prize ==
Since 2004, an annual Botul Prize has been awarded for a work that mentions Botul. It is awarded under the auspices of a Foundation for Botul Botulism.

=== Prize winners ===
- 2004: Jacques Gaillard, for Mes aventures en Haute Savoie (My Adventures in Haute-Savoie)
- 2005: Ali Magoudi, for Rendez-vous (Appointments), and Jean-Hugues Lime, for Le Roi de Clipperton (The King of Clipperton)
- 2006: Patrice Minet, for Moi et la Reine d'Angleterre (Me and the Queen of England)
- 2007: Emmanuel Brouillard, for Trois claques à Balzac (Three Slaps at Balzac)
- 2009: Bertrand Rothé, for Lebrac, trois mois de prison) (Lebrac: Three Months in Prison)
- 2010: Bernard-Henri Lévy, for De la guerre en philosophie (On War in Philosophy)
- 2011: Frédéric Lordon, for D'un retournement l'autre
- 2012: Jacques Colombat for Alexandre Jacob, le forçat intraitable (Alexander Jacob: The Intractable Convict)
- 2013: Nathalie Peyrebonne, for Rêve général (General Dream)
- 2016: Hervé Le Tellier, for Moi et François Mitterrand (Me and François Mitterrand)

== See also ==
- Josiah S. Carberry, a fictional professor of Brown University
