= Pauline Delabroy-Allard =

French writer

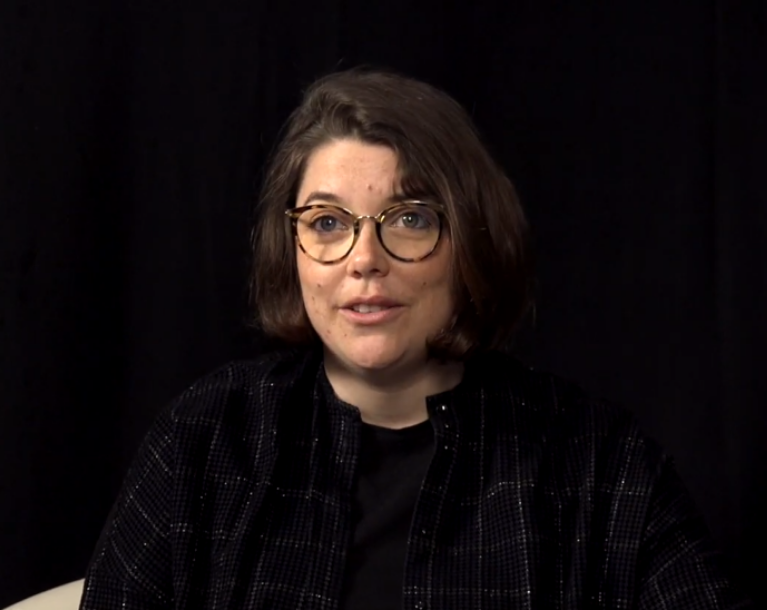
- Born: 1988 (age 37–38)
- Known for: Writer

Pauline Delabroy-Allard (born 1988) is a French writer. Her first novel, Ça raconte Sarah, was published by Les Éditions de Minuit in 2018. The book was shortlisted for the Prix Goncourt and won several awards, including the Prix du Style and the France Culture-Télérama student novel prize. An English translation of the novel was published in 2020, appearing in the UK as All About Sarah and in the US as They Say Sarah.

== Biography ==
Pauline Delabroy-Allard is the daughter of writer Jean Delabroy. After studying classics, she was a bookseller, an usherette in a cinema, and a librarian in a high school.

== Career ==
In 2013, she co-authored a first book with Kim Hullot-Guiot, La littérature expliquée aux matheux. That same year she released an acclaimed short film, Voyage en Mère inconnue (Journey to an Unknown Mother), about her life as a single mother, unexpectedly abandoned by her first partner, the father of her eldest daughter. She also contributes to the online magazine En attendant Nadeau.

In 2018, her first novel was published by Les Éditions de Minuit. Ça raconte Sarah received significant critical acclaim and won the Prix des Booksellers de Nancy / Le Point and the Prix Envoyé par la poste. The book was shortlisted for the Prix Goncourt and for the Prix Goncourt des lycéens. Delabroy-Allard also received the Polish, Romanian, and Swiss Goncourt List Prizes. That year, she won the Prix du Style as well as the France Culture-Télérama student novel prize.

Adriana Hunter translated the novel into English. The book was published in the UK by Harvill Secker as All About Sarah and in the US by The Other Press as They Say Sarah. In an interview with The Guardian, Delabroy-Allard revealed that she wrote it to get the story out of her head and then stuck it in a drawer." She said, “I didn’t expect anyone would want to publish it.”
