= Empress (novel) =

2006 book by Shan Sa

- First edition (French)
- Author: Shan Sa
- Original title: Impératrice
- Translator: Adriana Hunter
- Language: French
- Genre: Historical biographical novel
- Publisher: HarperCollins
- Publication date: May 2, 2006
- Publication place: France
- Media type: Print (hardcover)
- Pages: 321 pp (first edition)
- ISBN: 0-06-081758-5
- OCLC: 63245630
- Dewey Decimal: 843/.92 22
- LC Class: PQ3979.2.S47 I4713 2006

Empress (French: Impératrice) is a French biographical novel written by Shan Sa, a French author who was born in Beijing. It focuses on Empress Wu Zetian, from her upbringing to her rise to power from concubine to the first Empress of China. The historical fiction novel is told from her point of view (first person POV), and discusses her motivations in her court and love life.

== Awards ==
The book received the Paperback Readers' Award (French: Prix des lecteurs du Livre de Poche for Littérature) in 2005.
