= Véronique Olmi =

French playwright and novelist

Veronique Olmi
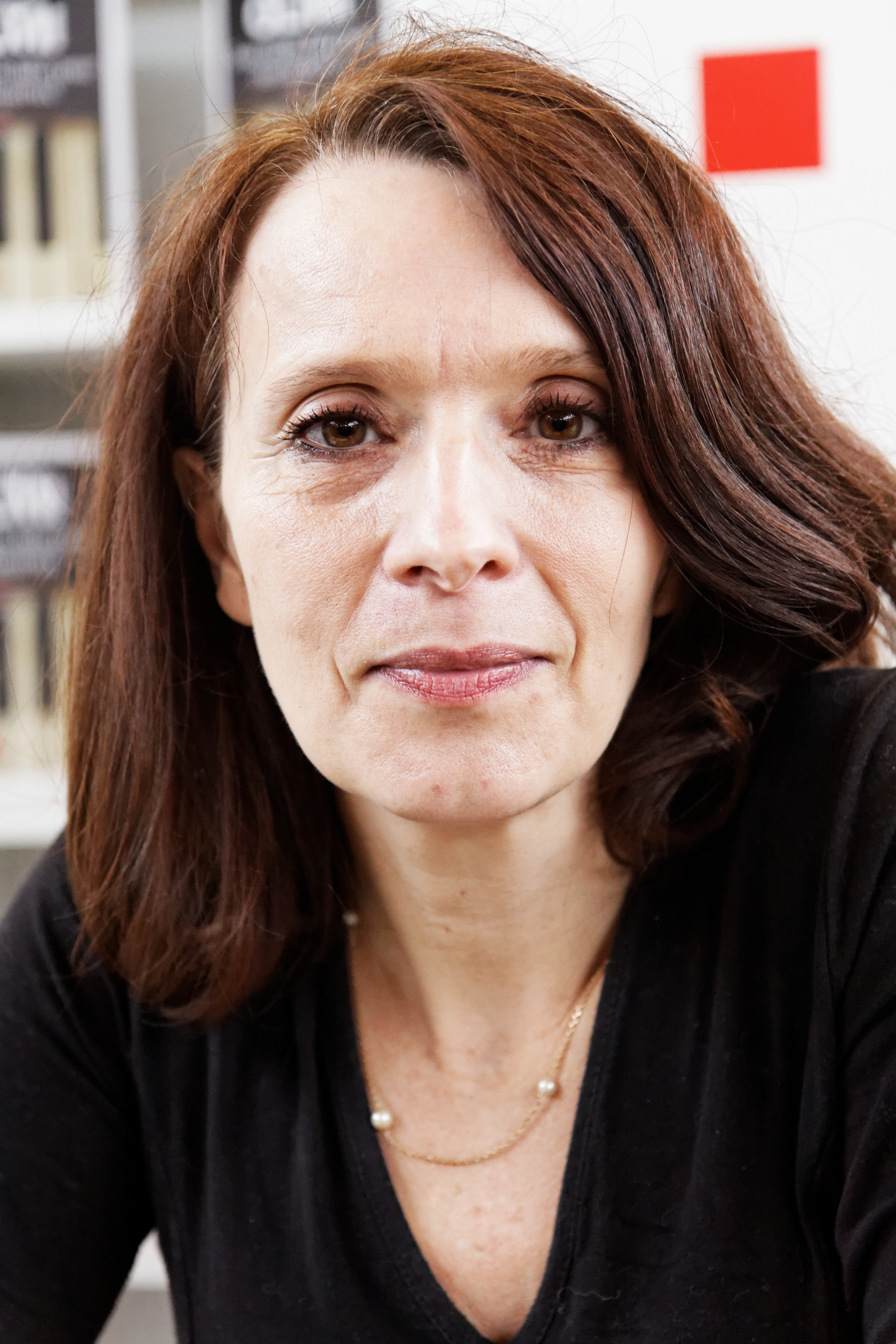
- Olmi in 2013
- Born: 1962 (age 63–64); Nice, France
- Occupations: Playwright, novelist and actor

Véronique Olmi (born 1962) is a French playwright and novelist. She won the Prix Alain-Fournier emerging artist award for her 2001 novella Bord de Mer. It has since been translated into several European languages. Olmi has published a dozen plays and half a dozen novels.

== Bibliography ==
Theatre

- 1996: Le Passage, Édition de l'Arche
- 1997: Chaos debout/Les nuits sans lune, Édition de l'Arche
- 1998: Point à la ligne/La Jouissance du scorpion, Édition de l'Arche
- 2000: Le Jardin des apparences, Actes Sud
- 2001: Mathilde, Actes Sud
- 2006: Je nous aime beaucoup, Éditions Grasset
- 2009: Une séparation, Triartis
- 2014: Des baisers, pardon Avant-Scéne

Novels

- Bord de mer, Actes Sud, 2001 et 2003, (translated as Beside the Sea by Adriana Hunter, published by Peirene Press)
  - Prix Alain-Fournier in 2002, Babel, J'ai lu
- Numéro six, Actes Sud, 2002 Babel, J'ai lu, Biblio Collège et Biblio lycée.
- Un si bel avenir, Actes Sud, 2003 Babel
- La petite fille aux allumettes, Stock, 2004
- La pluie ne change rien au désir, Grasset, 2005 le Livre de Poche
- Sa passion, Grasset, 2007. Le Livre de Poche
- La Promenade des russes, Grasset, 2008 Le Livre de Poche
- Le Premier Amour, Grasset, 2010 Le Livre de Poche
- Cet été-là, Grasset, 2011, Le Livre de Poche
  - Prix Maison de la Presse 2011
- Nous étions faits pour être heureux, Albin Michel, 2012, Le Livre de Poche
- La Nuit en vérité, Albin Michel, 2013
- J’aimais mieux quand c’était toi, Albin Michel, 2015
- Participe au recueil "Nous sommes CHARLIE" 60 écrivains unis pour la liberté d'expression. janvier 2015
- Bakhita: A Novel of the Saint of Sudan, Editions Albin Michel, 20117
- Les Évasions particulières, Albin Michel, 2020, (translated as Daughters Beyond Control by Alison Anderson, published by Europa Editions)
- Le gosse, Albin Michel, 2022.

Théâtre

- Un autre que moi, Albin Michel, 2016

Short stories

- Privée, Édition de l'Arche, 1998

Biographie Théâtre en France:

- 1997: Le Passage directed by Brigitte Jaques-Wajeman (Vidy Lausanne, Les Abbesses théâtre de la Ville) Prix de La fondation La Poste
- 1998: Chaos debout directed by Jacques Lassalle (Festival officiel d'Avignon. Les Abbesses théâtre de la Ville)
- 1998: Point à la ligne directed by Philippe Adrien (Vieux Colombiers Comédie française) Prix CIC Théâtre
- 2000: Le jardin des apparences directed by Gildas Bourdet (La Criée. Théâtre Hebertot) Nomination aux Molières meilleur auteur. Molière meilleur acteur pour Jean-Paul Roussillon.
- 2002: Mathilde directed by Didier Long (Théâtre du Rond Point)
- 2006: Je nous aime beaucoup directed by José Paul (Petit Théâtre de Paris)
- 2009: Une séparation (Mise en espace Christophe Correia auFestival de la correspondance de Grignan) Prix Beaumarchais-Durance.
- 2011: "Vivre-écrire-vivre" : adaptation de la correspondance de Tsvétaïeva à Konstantin Rodzevitch. Mise en espace Richard Brunel, au Festival de la correspondance de Grignan
- 2013: Une séparation directed by Jean-Philippe Puymartin and Anne Rotenberg (Théâtre des Mathurins)

Screenwriter:

- Bord de mer for Bagherra Production
- Un souvenir for Jade Production et France 2

Actress:

- À demain Modigliani (V. Olmi) (directed by François Lazaro)
- Je nous aime beaucoup (V. Olmi) (directed by José Paul)
- Le Diable (M. Tsvétaïeva) (directed by D.M. Maréchal)
- La Reine de Nacre (Bernard Werber) (réalisation Bernard Werber)
- Un mariage d'écriture et d'amour (Carson Mc Cullers) (mise en espace Anne Rotenberg)
- Les nuits sans lune (V.Olmi) (mise en espace Doris Mirescu)
- Bord de mer (V. Olmi)
- La Jouissance du scorpion (V.Olmi)
- Une Séparation (V.Olmi) (directed by Jean-Philippe Puymartin et Anne Rotenberg)

Mise-en-scène: "Rilke, Pasternak, Tsvetaïeva, la correspondance inachevée" avec Michael Lonsdale, Paris, Maison de la Poésie
