= Hervé Le Tellier =

French author; winner of the 2020 Prix Goncourt

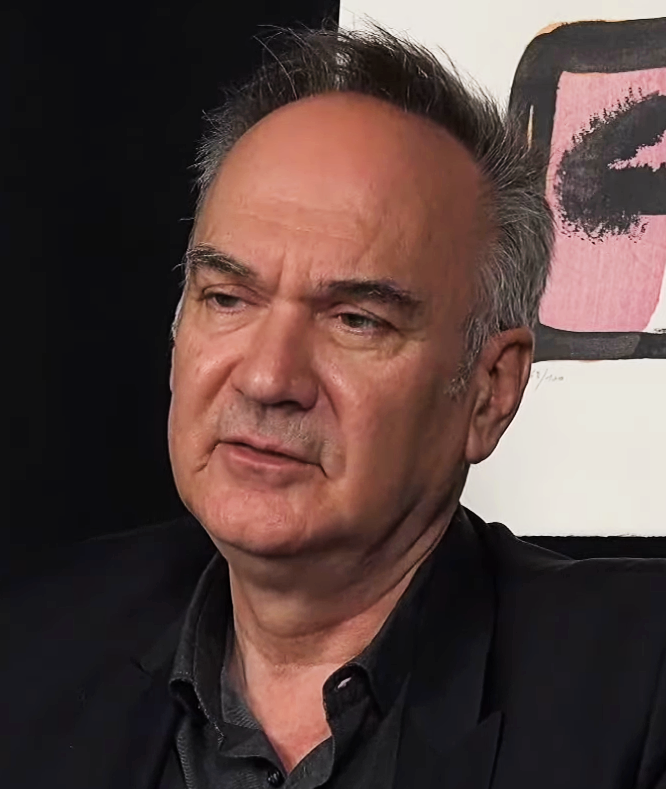
- Hervé Le Tellier in 2021
- Born: April 21, 1957 (age 69); Paris, France
- Education: Centre de formation des journalistes de Paris
- Occupations: Novelist; poet; journalist
- Writing career
- Language: French
- Notable awards: Prix Goncourt (2020)
- Literary movement: Oulipo

Hervé Le Tellier (French pronunciation: [ɛʁve lə tɛlje]; born 21 April 1957) is a French writer and linguist, and a member of the international literary group Oulipo (Ouvroir de Littérature Potentielle, which translates roughly as "workshop of potential literature"). He is its fourth president. Other notable members have included Raymond Queneau, Georges Perec, Italo Calvino, Jacques Roubaud, Jean Lescure and Harry Mathews. He won the 2020 Prix Goncourt for The Anomaly.

== Biography ==
Born in Paris, Le Tellier started his career as a scientific journalist, and joined Oulipo in 1992. As an author, he came to general attention in 1998 with the publication in France of his book Les amnésiques n'ont rien vécu d'inoubliable, a collection of one thousand very short sentences all beginning with "Je pense que" (I think that), published in English as A Thousand Pearls (for a Thousand Pennies). His rather complex novel Le voleur de nostalgie is a tribute to the Italian writer Italo Calvino. He is also one of the participants of Papous dans la tête, the cult literary quiz of France Culture, the French cultural radio station.

He became in 2002 a daily contributor to the website of the newspaper Le Monde with a short satirical chronicle called Papier de verre ("sandpaper"). He founded, with Frederic Pages and others, the "Association of Friends of Jean-Baptiste Botul" to promote this fictitious philosopher and his school of "Botulism".

One of his most recent publications is Esthétique de l’Oulipo (The Aesthetics of Oulipo), a very personal essay on literature under constraint, considered from a linguistic perspective.

Seven of his books have been translated into English, from Enough about love (Other Press) to The Sextine Chapel (Dalkey Archive).

== Award ==
- 2020: Prix Goncourt for The Anomaly (French: L'anomalie). He is the first member of Oulipo to win the Goncourt.

== Published books ==
- Sonates de bar, short stories, 1991.
- Le Voleur de nostalgie, novel, 1992.
- La Disparition de Perek, 1997.
- Les amnésiques n'ont rien vécu d'inoubliable, 1998 (A Thousand Pearls (for a Thousand Pennies))
- Inukshuk, 1998, videograms by Jean-Baptiste Decavèle.
- Joconde jusqu'à cent, 1999.
- Zindien, 2000, poetry, illustrated by Henri Cueco.
- Encyclopaedia Inutilis, short stories, 2002.
- Joconde sur votre indulgence, 2002.
- Cités de mémoire, 2003, (Sighted cities)
- La Chapelle Sextine, novel, 2005 (The Sextine Chapel).
- Esthétique de l'Oulipo, essay, 2006.
- Je m'attache très facilement, novel, 2007 (The Intervention of a Good Man).
- Les Opossums célèbres, poetry, portmanteau words, illustrated by Xavier Gorce, 2007.
- Assez parlé d'amour, novel, Éditions Jean-Claude Lattès, 2009 (Enough About Love).
- L'Herbier des villes, urban haïkaï, Éditions Textuel, 2010.
- Eléctrico W, novel, Éditions Jean-Claude Lattès, 2011.
- Contes liquides, written under the nom de plume Jaime Montestrela, short stories, Éditions de l'Attente, 2013, Grand Prix de l'Humour Noir.
- Demande au muet, socratic dialogs, Editions Nous, 2014.
- Moi et François Mitterrand, 2016, Editions Jean-Claude Lattes.
- Toutes les familles heureuses, 2017, Editions Jean-Claude Lattes⁴ (All Happy Families).
- L'anomalie, 2020, Éditions Gallimard
- Le nom sur le mur, 2024, Éditions Gallimard

=== In English ===
- The Sextine Chapel, translated by Ian Monk, Dalkey Archive Press, 2011. ISBN 978-1-56478-575-6
- A Thousand Pearls (for a Thousand Pennies), translated by Ian Monk, Dalkey Archive Press, 2011, ISBN 1-56478-636-6.
- Enough About Love, translated by Adriana Hunter, Other Press, 2011, ISBN 978-1-59051-399-6
- The Intervention of a Good Man, translated by Adriana Hunter, Other Press, 2011, ISBN 978-1-59051-492-4
- Electrico W, translated by Adriana Hunter, Other Press, 2013, ISBN 978-1-59051-533-4. For her translation, Adriana Hunter won the 27th Annual Translation Prize founded by the French-American Foundation and the Florence Gould Foundation.
- All happy families, translated by Adriana Hunter, Other Press, March 2019, ISBN 978-1-59051-938-7.
- Atlas inutilis, in French Contes liquides, "Fluid fables", translated by Cole Swensen, Black Square Editions, 2018, ISBN 978-0-9860050-9-1.
- The Anomaly, translated by Adriana Hunter, Other Press, November 2021, ISBN 978-1-63542-169-9.

=== In English, with Oulipo ===
- Oulipo Compendium, Atlas Press, 1998
- Winter Journeys, Atlas Press, 2000
