= The Gardens of Consolation =

2015 French novel by Parisa Reza

- Cover of 1st English edition, 2016
- Author: Parisa Reza
- Original title: Les jardins de consolation
- Translator: Adriana Hunter
- Language: French
- Publisher: Gallimard, Europa Editions
- Publication date: 2015
- English publication date: 2016
- ISBN: 9781609453503

The Gardens of Consolation (Les jardins de consolation) is the first novel by Iranian-French writer Parisa Reza.

It was awarded the 2015 Prix Senghor and the 2017 Prix littéraire Québec-France Marie-Claire-Blais.

== Plot ==
The story concerns a couple who marry and move to Tehran. They are illiterate and their son is brilliant. They witness changes in power in Iran and their son became a follower of the politician Mohammad Mosaddegh.

== Publication history ==
The first edition of Les jardins de consolation was published in 2015 (Paris:Gallimard, ISBN 9782070147649). An English translation by Adriana Hunter was published in 2016 (New York:Europa Editions, ISBN 9781609453503), and a Persian translation by Abolfazl Allahdadi in 2022 (Borj).
