= Enough About Love =

2009 novel by Hervé Le Tellier

- First edition cover (JC Lattès)
- Author: Hervé Le Tellier
- Original title: Assez parlé d'amour
- Translator: Adriana Hunter
- Language: French
- Set in: Paris
- Publisher: JC Lattès
- Publication date: 26 August 2009
- Publication place: France
- English publication date: 1 February 2011
- Media type: Print
- Pages: 279
- ISBN: 978-2-7096-3342-0 (French first edition)
- OCLC: 434020252
- Dewey Decimal: 843/.914
- LC Class: PQ2672.E11455 A92 2009

Enough About Love (French: Assez parlé d'amour) is a 2009 French novel by Hervé Le Tellier. It was first published by JC Lattès on 26 August 2009. The novel was translated into English by Adriana Hunter and published by Other Press on 1 February 2011.

== Plot ==
Though its title may suggest otherwise, Enough About Love's main topic is love. As Le Tellier writes in the prologue, "Any man—or woman—who wants to hear nothing—or no more—about love should put this book down."

According to the Other Press website, Enough About Love concerns the following:

Anna and Louise could be sisters, but they don’t know each other. They are both married with children, and for the most part, they are happy. On almost the same day, Anna, a psychiatrist, crosses paths with Yves, a writer, while Louise, a lawyer, meets Anna’s analyst, Thomas. For our four characters, their lives are unexpectedly turned upside down by the arrival of love. For Anna, meeting Yves has brought a flurry of excitement to her life and made her question her values, her reliable husband, and her responsibilities to her children. For Louise, a successful career woman in a stable and comfortable marriage, her routine is uprooted by the youthful passion she feels for Thomas. Enough About Love captures the euphoria of desire through tender and unflinching portraits of husbands, wives, and lovers.

== Format ==
A member of OuLiPo and a former mathematician, Le Tellier follows sets of literary constraints based on mathematics to spur literary creation. In Enough About Love, he suggests that he used a game of Abkhazian dominoes to help structure the plot. Le Tellier says that a dimension of play essential to his writing and that he "like[s] when a constraint leads [him] away from an expected path." "I’m confronted with a text that astonishes me, even though it’s my own. It’s a rare pleasure."

The chapters are named after their major players. The text contains a lot of dialogue, making the novel feel somewhat like a play, and sentences are often short. Le Tellier incorporates many different forms of narrative, including emails, pages from a character's book, a script of an academic lecture, footnotes detailing Jewish parables, a homage to his friend the French writer Edouard Levé, and tour-guide pamphlets, and says that his ability to do this is part of what he likes about the form of novel.

== Reception ==
On the whole, reviews for Enough About Love have been positive.

Publishing Perspectives said in their review that ran on January 30, 2011, written by Gwendolyn Dawson, that Enough About Love was "highly recommended". "The overall effect is kaleidoscopic, the characters’ ever-shifting emotions and interactions slide against each other to reveal different shades and nuances. Enough About Love’s complex structure supports and enhances its story, and Adriana Hunter’s adept English translation delivers all the playfulness and complexity of the original." Dawson ultimately describes the novel as a "stunningly intimate portrayal of love, leaving the reader feeling like a voyeur who stumbled upon an open bedroom window, uncomfortable and thrilled at the same time."

World Literature Today called Enough About Love a "smart, droll, finely crafted novel" in their May/June 2011 review of it. In the same article, mention is made about what the novel says about writing: "This is a book about love, certainly, but it is also a book about love stories, and the way in which those stories play out according to their own logic. Watching Hervé Le Tellier conduct that process as he leads his characters in and out of love, one is reminded that literature, too, is an affair of the heart."

Newcity Lit wrote in their review on February 23, 2011, that "Le Tellier creates a sophisticated cast who form the love quartet at the center of this novel" and that his "prose is beautiful in its simplicity, its honesty." They praise his somewhat unconventional format, saying that the short sentences "[speak] volumes with their brevity," and that the various narrative forms used "excel at breaking up the narration." Ultimately, they say that, "sometimes witty and humorous, sometimes tragic and serious, “Enough About Love” is a lot like love. Both leave you wanting more."
