= Maghrebis =

Inhabitants of Maghreb region

المغاربيون al-Maghāribiyyun

Regions with significant populations
- Maghreb
- Algeria: 47,400,000
- Morocco: 38,670,000
- Tunisia: 12,135,000
- Libya: 7,112,000
- France: 5,326,000
- Mauritania: 4,975,000
- Israel: 750,000–950,000
- Canada^{[c]}: 274,425

Languages
- Maghrebi Arabic; Berber languages

Religion
- Predominantly: Sunni Islam; Minority: Judaism, Ibadi Islam
- ^{a} Without Ceuta and Melilla.: ^{b} Primarily in France, where nearly half of all Maghrebis in Europe reside.; ^{c} Primarily in Quebec, which has the largest Maghrebi community in North America.; Population statistics from the CIA World factbook (July 2011 pop est.)

Maghrebis or Maghrebians (Arabic: المغاربيون, romanized: al-Maghāribiyyun) are the inhabitants of the Maghreb region of North Africa. It is a modern Arabic term meaning "Westerners", denoting their location in the western part of the Arab world. Maghrebis are predominantly of Arab and Berber origins.

== Name ==
Maghrebis were known during ancient and medieval times as the Mauri and Moors. The word Moor is of Phoenician origin. The etymology of the word can be traced back to the Phoenician term Mahurin, meaning "Westerners", from which the ancient Greeks derive Mauro, and from which Latin derives Mauri.

The Arabic term maghrib (Arabic: مغرب) was given by the first Muslim Arab settlers to the recently conquered region located west of the Umayyad capital of Damascus in the 7th century AD. It initially referred to the area extending from Alexandria in the east to the Atlantic Ocean in the west.

== Religion ==
Historic records of religion in the coastal Mediterranean Maghreb show its inclusion in the Classical World, with coastal colonies established first by Phoenicians, Greeks, and later extensive conquest and rule by the Romans. By the 2nd century common era, the area had become a center of Latin-speaking Christianity. Both Roman settlers and Romanized Berbers converted to Christianity. The region produced figures such as Christian Church writer Tertullian (c. 155 – c. 202); and Christian Church martyrs or leading figures such as St Cyprian of Carthage (c. 210 – 258); Saint Monica; her son the philosopher Augustine of Hippo (354 – 430); and Julia of Corsica (5th century). The region was a birthplace of many Christians movements such as Arianism and Donatism, which have since been abandoned.

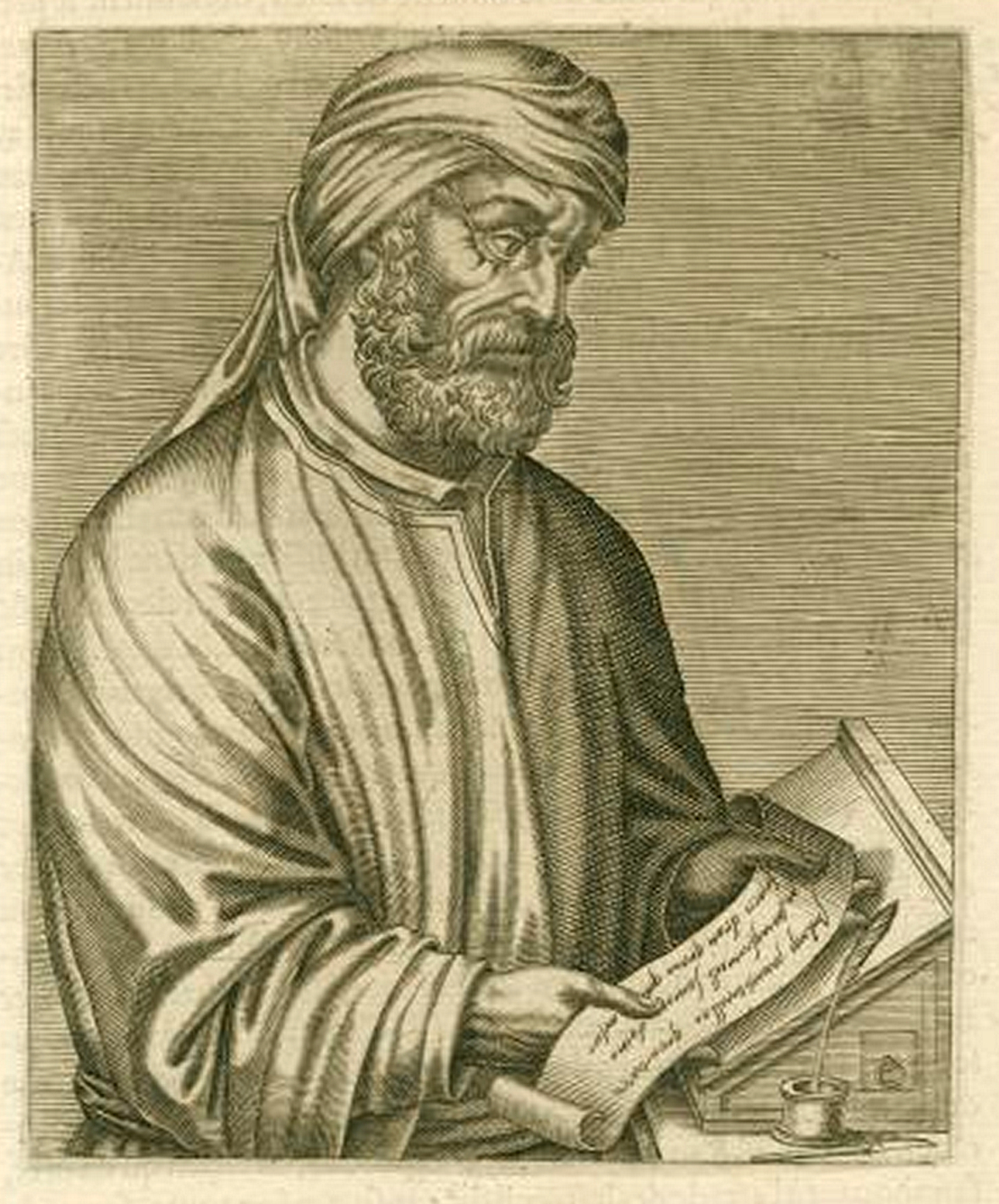
Tertullian

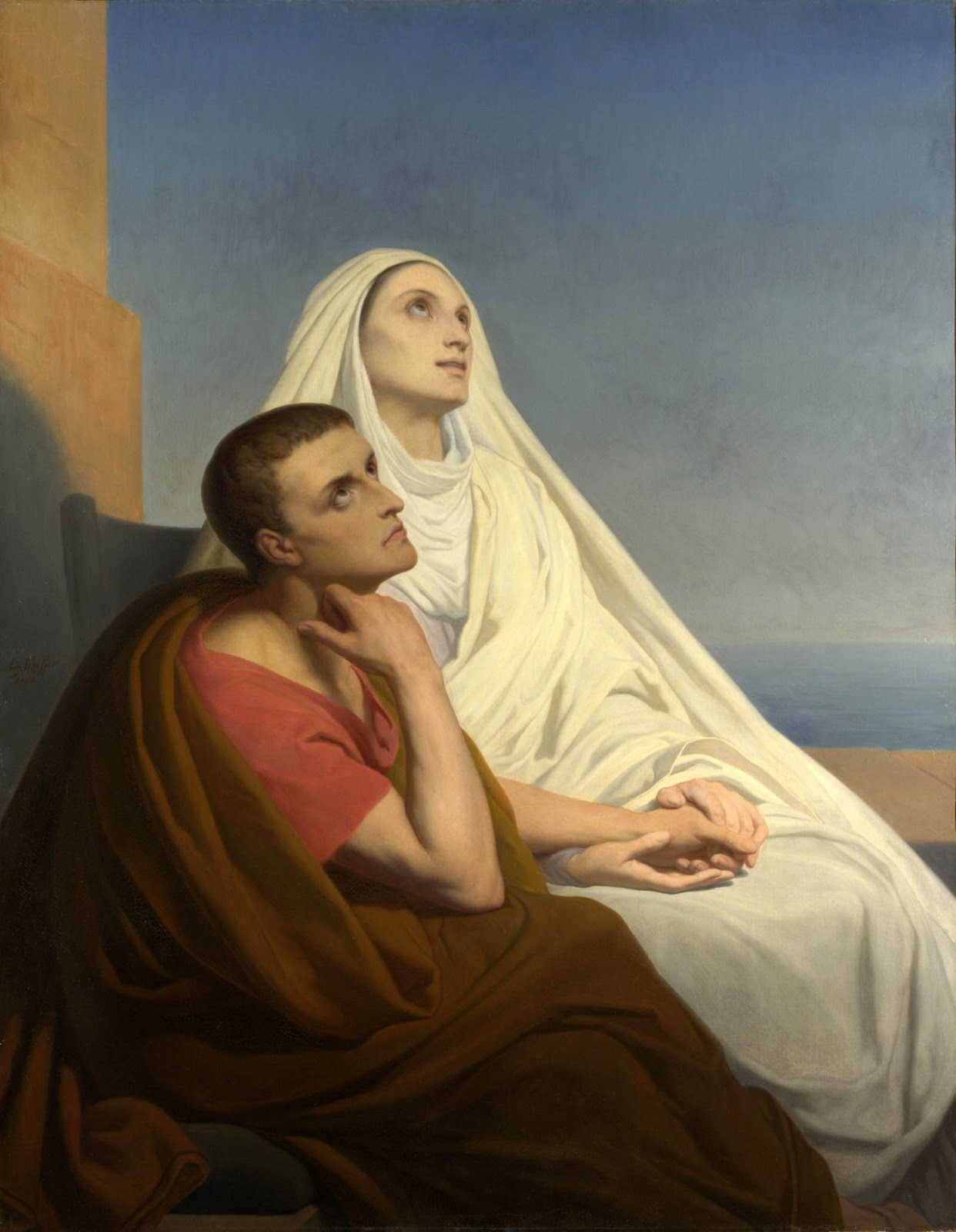
Saint Augustine and Saint Monica

The domination of Christianity ended when Arab conquests brought Islam to the Maghreb in 647. Carthage fell in 698; the remainder of the Maghreb followed in subsequent decades. Gradual Islamization proceeded, although surviving letters showed correspondence from regional Christians to Rome until the 9th century. Throughout the Maghreb, Christianity remained a living faith. Christian bishoprics and dioceses continued to be active, with relations continuing with Rome. As late as Pope Benedict VII (974-983) reign, a new Archbishop of Carthage was consecrated. Evidence of Christianity in the region faded throughout the 10th century.

During the seventh century, the region's peoples began their nearly conversion to Islam. Local Jewish communities (Maghrebi Jews) historically thrived throughout the region; there also exists a small Local Christian community. Conversions to Christianity, especially to Evangelicalism, during colonial times mostly in Algeria has increased there population in the region. especially in Kabylie

Most Muslims follow the Maliki school of Sunni Islam. Small Ibadi communities remain in some areas. A strong tradition of venerating marabouts and saints' tombs is found throughout regions inhabited by Berbers. Any map of the region demonstrates the tradition: the proliferation of "sidi"s show places named after the marabouts. As with certain other religious traditions, this significantly decreased during the 20th century. A network of zawiyas traditionally helped perpetuate basic literacy in Arabic and knowledge of Islam in rural regions.

== Diaspora ==
=== France ===
Maghrebis have settled mainly in the industrial regions in France, especially in the Île-de-France and Mediterranean regions. Many famous French people like Édith Piaf, Isabelle Adjani, Arnaud Montebourg, Alain Bashung, Dany Boon, Gérald Darmanin and many others have Maghrebi ancestry.

According to Michel Tribalat, a researcher at INED, there were more than 4.6 million people of Maghrebi origin (with at least one Maghrebi grandparent from Algeria, Morocco or Tunisia) living in France in 2011 (3 million in 1999). Below is a table of population of Maghrebi origin in France in 2011, numbers are in thousands:

Country of origin (2011)	Immigrants	1st generation born in France	2nd generation born in France (aged under 60 only)	Total
Algeria	737	1 170	563	2 470
Morocco	679	698	130	1 507
Tunisia	246	280	129	655
Total Maghreb	1 662	2 148	821	4 631

Note: for second generation born in France only individuals under 60 are taken into account.

According to Institut national de la statistique et des études économiques (the French National Institute for Statistics and Economic Studies), 16% of newborns in France between 2006 and 2008 have at least one Maghrebi grandparent born in the Greater Maghreb.

In 2005, the percentage of young people under 18 of Maghrebi origin (at least one immigrant parent) were about 7% in Metropolitan France, 12% in Île-de-France, 13% in Lyon, 21% in Perpignan, 22% in the department of Seine-Saint-Denis, 37% in 18th arrondissement of Paris and 40% in several arrondissements of Marseille.

2005	Seine-Saint-Denis	Val-de-Marne	Val-d'Oise	Lyon	Paris	France
Total Maghreb	22.0%	13.2%	13.0%	13.0%	12.1%	6.9%

According to other sources between 5 and 8 million people of Maghrebin origin live in France, and between 150,000 and 300,000 people of Maghrebin origin live in Canada.

== See also ==
- Berbers
- Maghrebi Arabs
- Arabized Berbers
- Maghrebi Jews
- List of Maghrebis
- Muslim conquest of North Africa
- Moors
- Barbary Coast
