= Édouard Levé =

French writer, photographer, and painter (1965–2007)

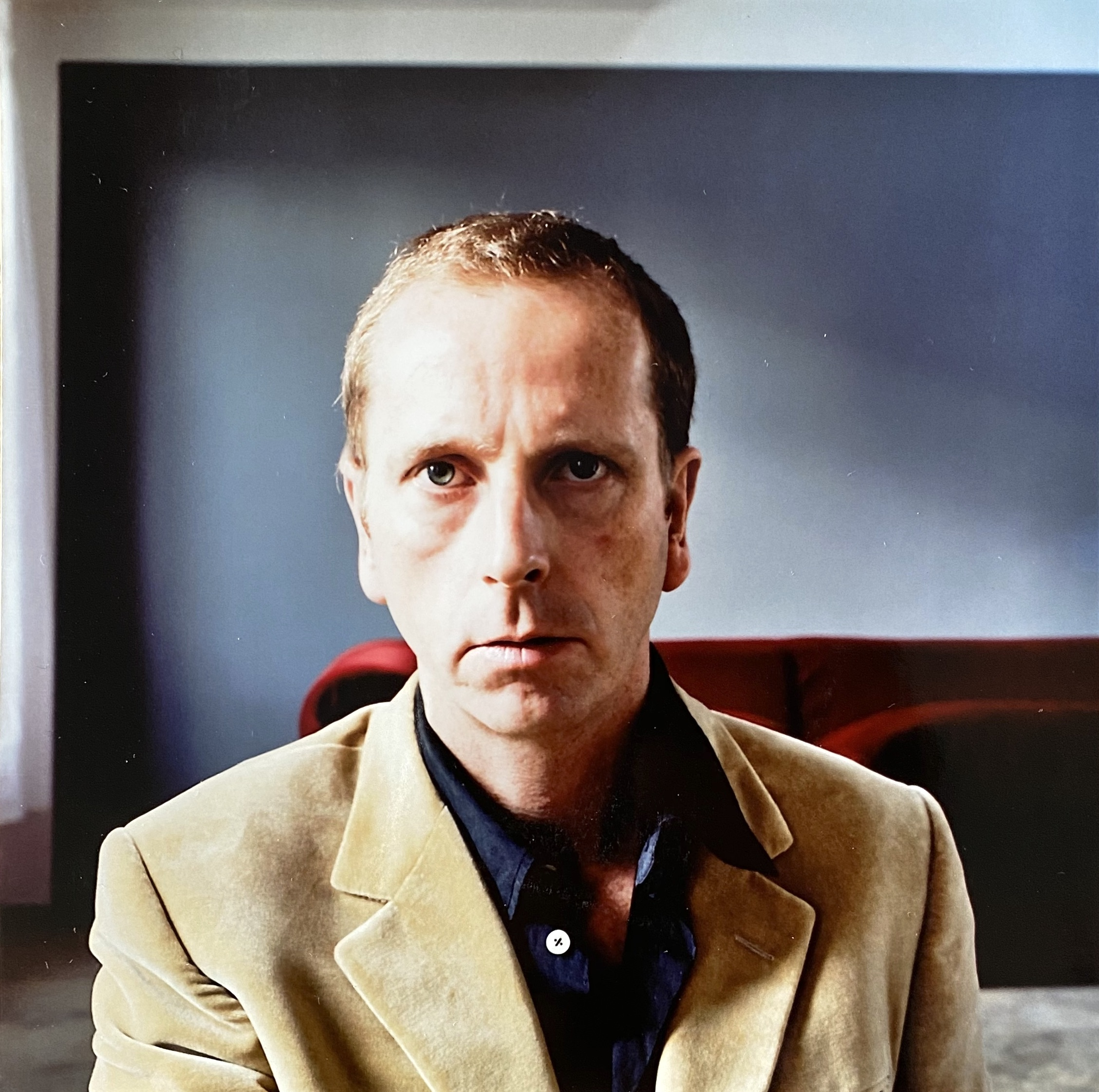
- Born: 1 January 1965; Neuilly-sur-Seine, France
- Died: 15 October 2007 (aged 42); Paris, France
- Education: ESSEC Business School
- Occupations: Writer; photographer; painter
- Notable work: Autoportrait (2005); Suicide (2008)

Édouard Levé (1 January 1965 – 15 October 2007) was a French writer, photographer, and painter.

== Early career ==
Levé was born in Neuilly-sur-Seine on 1 January 1965. He was self-taught as an artist and studied business at the elite ESSEC Business School. He began painting in 1991. Levé made abstract paintings but abandoned the field (claiming to have burned most of his paintings) and took up color photography upon his return from an influential two-month trip to India in 1995.

== Books and photographs ==
Levé's first book, Oeuvres (2002), is an imaginary list of more than 500 non-existent conceptual artworks by the author, although some of the ideas were taken up as the premises of later projects actually completed by Levé (for example the photography books Amérique and Pornographie).

Levé traveled in the United States in 2002, writing Autoportrait and taking the photographs for the series Amérique, which pictures small American towns named after cities in other countries. Autoportrait consists entirely of disconnected, unparagraphed sentences of the authorial speaker's assertions and self-description, a "collection of fragments" by a "literary cubist."

His final book, Suicide, although fictional, evokes the suicide of his childhood friend 20 years earlier, which he had also mentioned in "a shocking little addendum, tucked nonchalantly...into Autoportrait." He delivered the manuscript to his editor ten days before he took his own life at 42 years old.

== Reception and influence ==
A chapter in Hervé Le Tellier's novel Enough About Love pays homage to Edouard Levé, who appears as the character Hugues Léger, and to his book Autoportrait, the introspective and fragmentary style of which is imitated in an extract of a book titled Definition.

Gérard Gavarry's book Expérience d'Edward Lee, Versailles (P.O.L., 2009) takes as its inspiration one hundred photos by Levé.

== Awards and honors ==
- 2013 Best Translated Book Award, shortlist, Autoportrait

== Bibliography ==
=== Narratives ===
- Œuvres (P.O.L, 2002). Works, trans. Jan Steyn (Dalkey Archive, 2014)
- Journal (P.O.L, 2004). Newspaper, trans. Jan Steyn and Caite Dolan-Leach (Dalkey Archive, 2015)
- Autoportrait (P.O.L, 2005). Autoportrait, trans. Lorin Stein (Dalkey Archive, 2012)
- Suicide (P.O.L, 2008). Suicide, trans. Jan Steyn (Dalkey Archive, 2011)

=== Art books ===
- Angoisse (Philéas Fogg, 2002)
- Reconstitutions (Philéas Fogg, 2003). Bringing together the restaged photographs of Actualités and Quotidien.
- Amérique (Léo Scheer, 2006). Photographs from American towns sharing names with world cities.
- Fictions (P.O.L, 2006). "Enigmatic" groups of black-clad people against a black background

=== Photography series ===
- 1996–1998: Homonymes (portraits of ordinary people with the same names as famous people)
- 1998: Reconstitutions - Rêves Reconstitués
- 2000–2002: Angoisse, Philéas Fogg (photographs taken around the city of Angoisse, whose name in French means "anguish")
- 2001–2002: Reconstitutions - Actualités (staged and anonymized photos playing on the stereotypes of press photography)
- 2002: Reconstitutions - Pornographie (clothed models in pornographic positions)
- 2003: Reconstitutions - Rugby (models in street clothing posed in rugby positions sans ball)
- 2003: Reconstitutions - Quotidien (newspaper or magazine photographs, restaged with actors who are anonymized and in everyday clothing against a black background)
