= Patrick Lapeyre =

French writer

- Born: 1949 (age 76–77); Pantin
- Writing career
- Language: French
- Notable work: La vie est brève et le désir sans fin
- Notable awards: Prix Femina

Patrick Lapeyre (French pronunciation: [patʁik lapɛʁ]) is a French writer, and winner of the Prix Femina, in 2010, for his seventh novel, La vie est brève et le désir sans fin.

Lapeyre was born in 1949 in Pantin. He attended the École Normale Supérieure with Alain Finkielkraut and Pascal Bruckner before studying literature at the Sorbonne. After becoming a teacher, he published his first novel, Le corps inflammable, in 1984. He received the Prix du Livre Inter in 2004 for L'Homme-soeur and the Prix Femina in 2010 for La vie est brève et le désir sans fin.

== Bibliography ==
- Le corps inflammable (novel, 1984); J'ai lu, 1988, ISBN 2-277-22313-1
- La lenteur de l'avenir (novel, 1987); Editions Gallimard, 2008, ISBN 2-07-033852-5
- Ludo et compagnie (novel), P.O.L, 1991, ISBN 2-86744-209-5
- Welcome to Paris (novel), P.O.L., 1994, ISBN 2-86744-402-0
- Sissy, c'est moi (novel), P.O.L, 1998, ISBN 2-86744-592-2
- L'Homme-soeur (novel, 2004), P.O.L., 2005, ISBN 2-86744-986-3
- La vie est brève et le désir sans fin (novel), P.O.L., Paris 2010, ISBN 978-2-8180-0603-0
  - Life Is Short and Desire Endless, (translated by Adriana Hunter). Other Press, 2012, ISBN 9781590514856
