= Shan Sa =

French author and painter

- 山飒
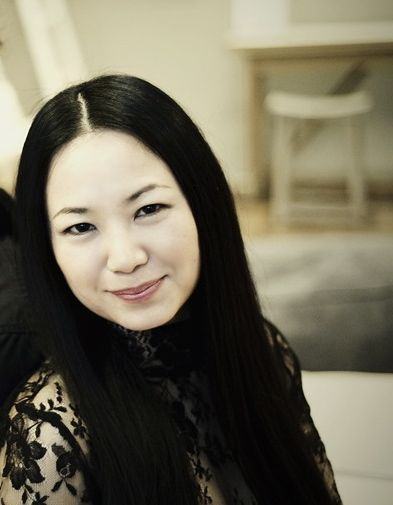
- Shan Sa
- Born: Yan Ni; October 26, 1972 (age 53); Beijing
- Occupations: author, painter
- Writing career
- Pen name: Shan Sa
- Genre: Romance
- Notable work: The Girl Who Played Go

Chinese name
- Traditional Chinese: 山颯
- Simplified Chinese: 山飒
Transcriptions
Standard Mandarin
- Hanyu Pinyin: Shān Sà

Birth name
- Traditional Chinese: 閻妮
- Simplified Chinese: 阎妮
Transcriptions
Standard Mandarin
- Hanyu Pinyin: Yán Nī

Shan Sa (山飒) is the pseudonym of Yan Ni (阎妮; born October 26, 1972, in Beijing, China), a French author and painter. The Girl Who Played Go was the first of her novels to be published outside France, and won the Prix Goncourt des Lycéens (a prize voted by secondary school students). Her second novel to appear in English translation was Empress (2006). She was awarded chevalier of the Ordre des Arts et des Lettres in July 2009 and chevalier of the Ordre national du Mérite in May 2011.

Shan Sa is also a painter with exhibitions in Paris, New York, and Shanghai.

== Biography ==
Shan Sa was born as Yan Ni in Beijing, China, to a scholarly family. She adopted the pseudonym Shan Sa from a poem by the Tang dynasty poet Bai Juyi. At age 8, she published her first poetry collection, and went on to obtain the first prize in the national poetry contest for children under 12 years, an event that created a public upheaval. After graduating from secondary school in Beijing, she moved to Paris in August 1990 thanks to a grant by the French government. Settling there with her father, a professor at the Sorbonne University, she quickly adopted the French language. In 1994, she finished her studies of philosophy. From 1994 to 1996 she worked as a secretary of painter Balthus. Thereafter she published her first two novels and a collection of poetry, meeting with great critical acclaim including the 1998 Prix Goncourt du Premier Roman (Prix Goncourt for first novel) for Porte de la paix céleste. In 2001 she reached the top of her success with the publication of her most famous book so far, The Girl Who Played Go (La Joueuse de Go in French). The book received good feedback from readers and was awarded a number of prizes, including the 2001 Prix Goncourt des Lycéens (Prix Goncourt of the High-school students) and has been translated to 32 languages.

== Bibliography ==
- Yan Ni's Poems (阎妮的诗, 1983).
- Porte de la paix céleste (Gate of Celestial Peace) (1997).
- Les Quatre Vies du saule (The Four Lives of the Willow) (1999).
- La Joueuse de go (The Girl Who Played Go) (2001).
- Impératrice (Empress) (2003), based on the life of Empress Wu of Zhou
- Les Conspirateurs (Conspirators) (2005)
- Alexandre et Alestria (Alexander and Alestria) (2006)
- La Cithare nue (The Ghost Empress) (2010)

== Awards ==
- Winner of the Prix Goncourt du Premier Roman for Porte de la paix céleste (Gate of Celestial Peace) in 1998.
- Winner of the Prix Cazes-Brasserie Lipp for Les Quatre Vies du saule (The Four Lives of the Willow) in 1999.
- Winner of the Prix Goncourt des Lycéens in 2001 and the 2004 Kiriyama Prize for fiction for La Joueuse de go (The Girl Who Played Go).
