= Christian Oster =

French writer (born 1949)

Christian Oster (born 1949) is a French writer. He has written more than a dozen novels, and he is also a prolific author of children's books. Noted works include My Big Apartment (1999) which won the Prix Médicis, and The Cleaning Woman (2001). The latter was adapted into a film by Claude Berri.
