= Anne-Dauphine Julliand =

French woman writer (born 1973)

Anne-Dauphine Julliand (born 23 November 1973) is a French woman writer. Her two published works are Deux petits pas sur le sable mouillé (Two Small Footprints in Wet Sand: A Mother's Memoir) in 2011 and Une journée particulière in 2013, essays recounting her family life experience with the serious illness of two of her children. She then made the documentary film Everyday Heroes (Et les mistrals gagnants), released in 2017.

== Life ==
Julliand was born in Paris. She studied journalism, then wrote, first in the daily press.

In July 2000, she married and had four children: Gaspard, Thaïs, Azylis and Arthur.

In 2006, her daughter Thaïs, born 29 February 2004 is diagnosed as a bearer of a metachromatic leukodystrophy, a rare form of lysosomal storage disease, and therefore has a very short life expectancy. In 2007, Thais died of her disease, while her younger sister Azylis was also found to be a bearer of leukodystrophy. Thanks to a hematopoietic stem cell transplantation, the disease progresses more slowly in her than in Thaïs. Azylis finally dies on 20 February 2017.

== Work ==
In 2011, Julliand published Deux petits pas sur le sable mouillé, which tells the story of the life, illness and death of Thaïs, at "Les Arènes" publishing house; this testimony is a great success, with 260,000 copies sold.

This book received the 2011 testimony prize of Le Pèlerin and is translated into twenty languages. In an interview with Famille chrétienne, she testifies to her Catholic faith and how it has been strengthened in the face of her daughter's hardships and sufferings. She says that love is the only cure and that she sees God behind this love, God's compassion.

On 23 May 2013, she published Une journée particulière, which recounts from her point of view the day of February 29, 2012, the day when Thaïs would have been eight years old.

In 2016, she made a feature-length documentary film Et les Mistrals gagnants on the theme of children and disease, in line with her book Deux petits pas sur le sable mouillé . The film was released on 1 February 2017. In 2024, she published her book Ajouter de la vie aux jours.
