= Hit Refresh =

Nonfiction book by Satya Nadella

- Author: Satya Nadella
- Language: English
- Genre: Nonfiction
- Publisher: HarperCollins
- Publication date: 2017
- Publication place: United States
- Media type: Print (hardback and ebook)
- ISBN: 978-0062652508 (hardback)

Hit Refresh: The Quest to Rediscover Microsoft's Soul and Imagine a Better Future for Everyone is a nonfiction book by Satya Nadella and co-authors Jill Tracie Nichols and Greg Shaw, with a foreword by Bill Gates, published in 2017. Nadella announced that the profits from the book would go to Microsoft Philanthropies and through that to nonprofit organizations.

Hit Refresh entered the New York Times Bestseller List in the nonfiction category at #5 and reached #4. A special annotated version of the book was given to each Microsoft employee.

== Summary ==
In Hit Refresh, Nadella interweaves his story of growing up in India and moving to the United States, his experiences at Microsoft before becoming CEO, and his ideas for changing the corporate culture. He often illustrates his statements with anecdotes about cricket and the challenges he has personally faced with his son's medical problems. Nadella includes three areas of future interest for Microsoft: artificial intelligence (AI), quantum computing, and mixed reality.

== Reception ==
Forbes said "Hit Refresh is optimistic about ways that tech will augment humans, grow the number of mid-tech jobs, and lead to social surplus." The Register described the book as "a sanitised rather than revelatory account of change at Microsoft". The reviewer at the Star Tribune notes "He is cautious in his storytelling but does delve into some of the decisionmaking, including buying Minecraft and repairing the company’s relationship with Samsung." The Washington Post characterizes it as "Part memoir, part leadership guide, part futurist vision of technology". Publishers Weekly says "Unpretentious and stirring, this well-written book provides surprising and welcome insights into a corporate giant." Kirkus Reviews says Hit Refresh is a "valuable blueprint for techies and others in a culture-change state of mind".
