= Aldo Naouri =

French paediatric psychologist and psychoanalyst (1937–2026)

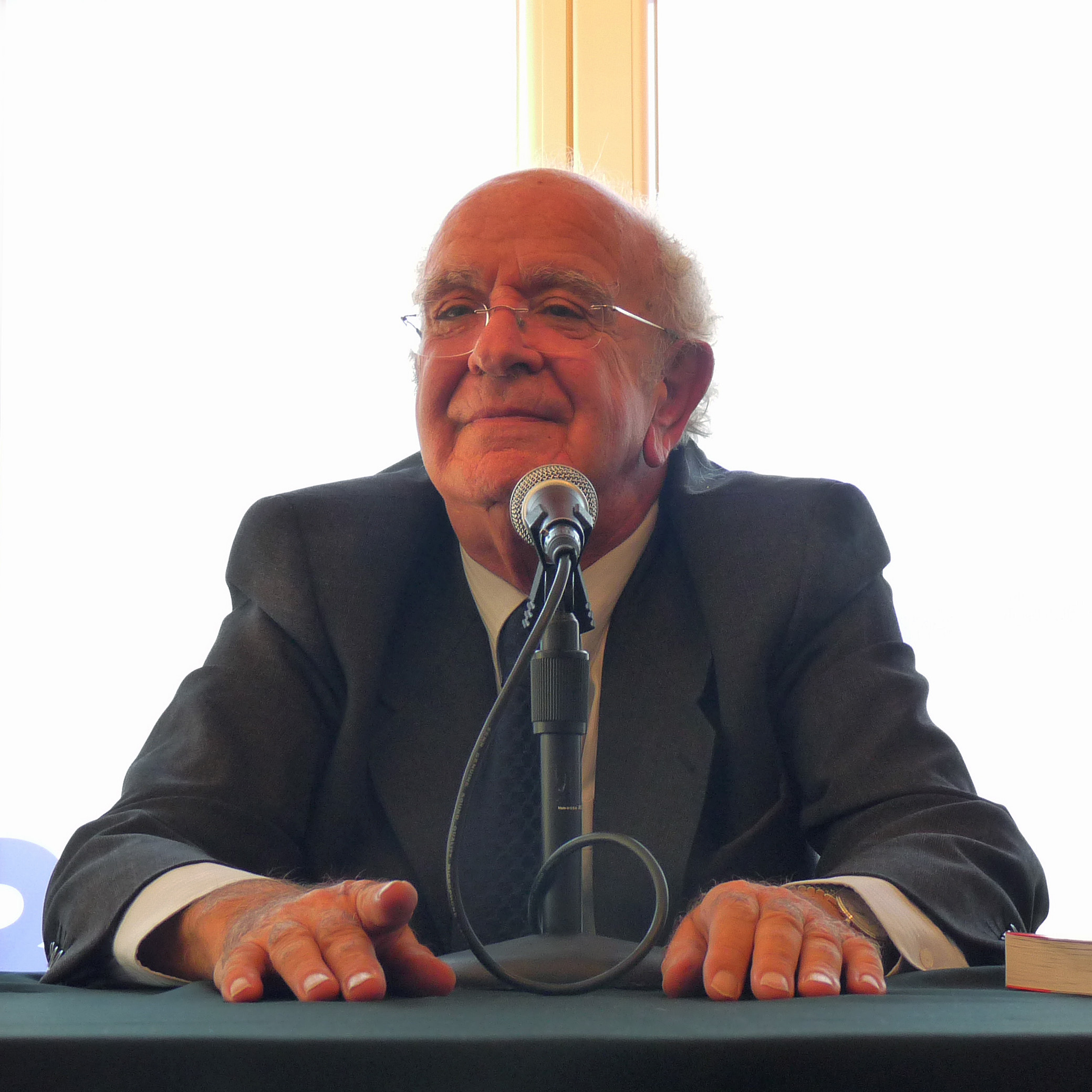
- Naouri in 2011
- Born: 22 December 1937; Benghazi, Italian Libya
- Died: 18 May 2026 (aged 88); Paris, France
- Education: University of Franche-Comté
- Occupations: Psychologist, psychoanalyst

Aldo Naouri (22 December 1937 – 18 May 2026) was a French paediatric psychologist and psychoanalyst.

== Life and career ==
Born into a Libyan Jewish family in Benghazi on 22 December 1937, Naouri was the tenth child of his illiterate, widow mother. In 1942, his family was expelled from Libya due to their French citizenship and settled in Orléansville, French Algeria. He began his studies in medicine at the University of Franche-Comté in Besançon in 1956. He specialised in pediatric psychology and centered much of his practice around psychoanalysis, particularly towards the end of his career.

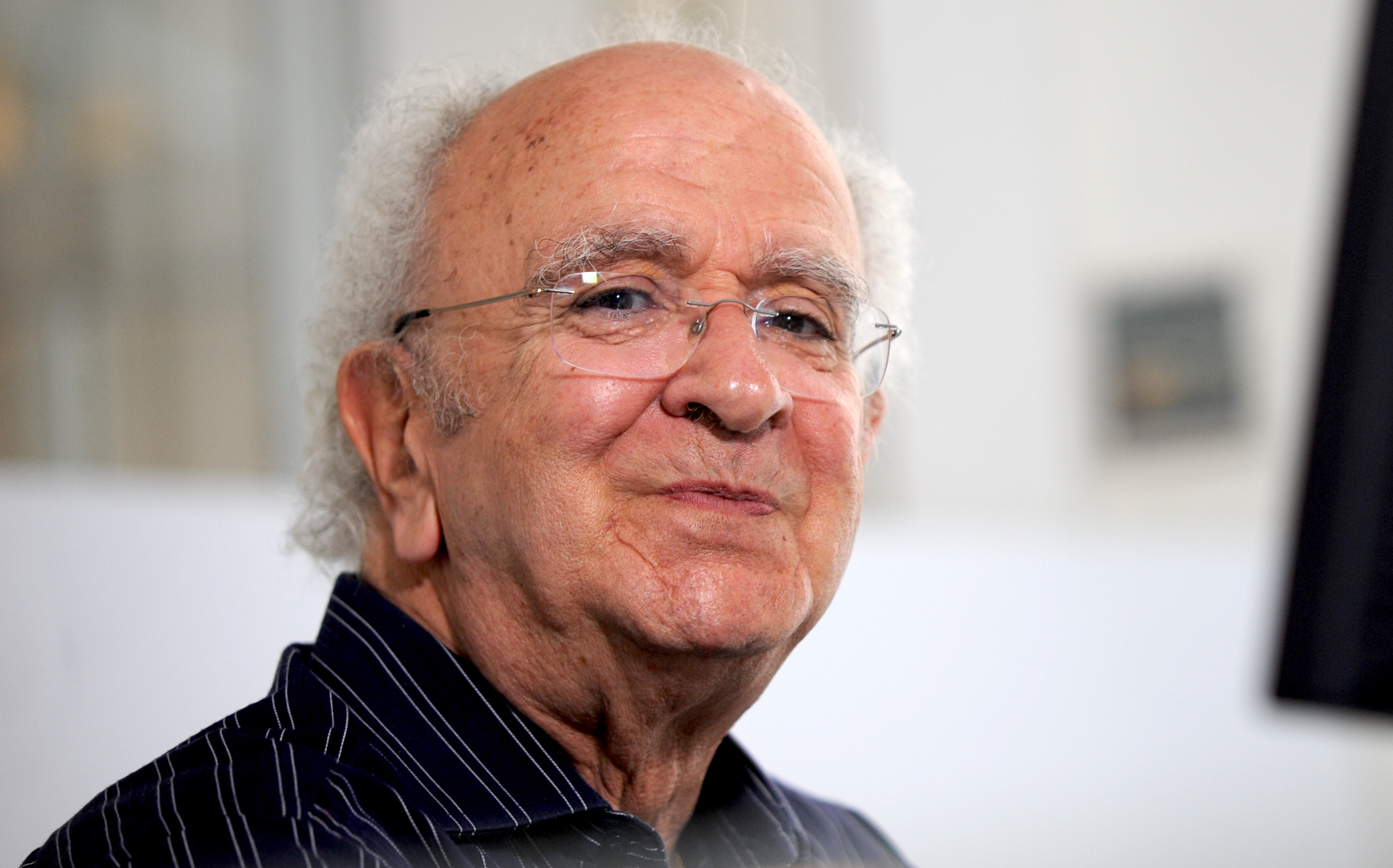
Aldo Naouri in 2010

Many of Naouri's statements sparked controversy, his stances deemed "reactionary" by Le Point. In 2013, controversy arose from statements made in his book Prendre la vie à pleine main, in which he recounted a time when he advised a new father to rape his wife after she had refused to have sex following childbirth. This statement was connected to another he made in 1998 regarding rape, which Janine Mossuz-Lavau said "totally disqualified" him. He attempted to justify his statement by saying he always condemns rape, including marital rape. He also faced criticism regarding his respect for the dignity of children in an open letter written by David Dutartre, a member of the Observatoire de la violence éducative ordinaire.

Naouri died in Paris on 18 May 2026, at the age of 88.

== Works ==
- L’Enfant porté (1982)
- Une place pour le père (1985)
- Parier sur l'enfant (1987)
- L’Enfant bien portant (1993)
- De l'inceste (1994)
- Le Couple et l’Enfant (1995)
- Les Filles et leurs mères (1998)
- Questions d’enfants (1999)
- Réponses de pédiatre (2000)
- L’Enfant bien portant (2004)
- Les Pères et les Mères (2004)
- Les mères juives n'existent pas (2005)
- Adultères (2006)
- Éduquer ses enfants. L'urgence d'aujourd'hui (2008)
- Faut-il être plus sévère avec nos enfants ? (2008)
- Les belles-mères, les beaux-pères, leurs brus et leurs gendres (2011)
- Prendre la vie à pleines mains (2013)
- Les couples et leur argent (2015)
- Entendre l'enfant (2017)
- Des bouts d'existence (2019)
- Ma mère : mon analyse et la sienne (2021)
