= The Girl Who Played Go =

2001 novel by Shan Sa

- French first edition
- Authors: Shan Sa, translated by Adriana Hunter
- Language: French, translated to English
- Published: Éditions Grasset 2001, English translation: Knopf Doubleday 2003
- Publication place: France
- Media type: Print
- Pages: 280 pp
- ISBN: 9782246797883

The Girl Who Played Go, originally published as La Joueuse de Go, is a 2001 French novel by Shan Sa set during the Japanese occupation of Manchuria. It tells the story of a 16-year-old Chinese girl who is exceptionally good at the game of Go, and her game with a young Japanese officer. It was translated into English in 2003 and has been translated into 32 languages in total.

The novel won a number of prizes, including the Prix Goncourt des Lycéens (Prix Goncourt of the High-school students) in 2001 and the Kiriyama Prize for fiction in 2004.

In 2004, the novel was adapted into a German stage production which premiered at Freies Werkstatt Theater.
