= Frédéric Pagès =

French journalist (born 1950)

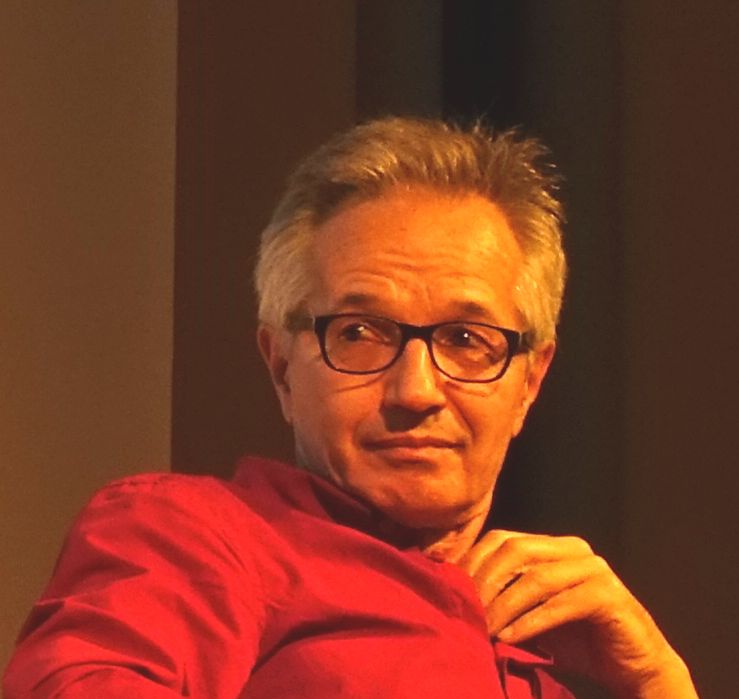
Frédéric Pagès at the Bibliothèque Mériadeck de Bordeaux on 17 October 2018

Frédéric Pagès (French: [paʒɛs]; born 1950) is a French journalist noted for his work with the satirical weekly, Le Canard enchaîné.

Pagès studied philosophy at University and worked as a high school teacher until 1985.

At Le Canard enchaîné, his humorous columns included Le Journal de Xavière T, a spoof diary of Xavière Tiberi, the wife of Jean Tiberi, then mayor of Paris, and, from December 2007, Le Journal de Carla B, a spoof diary of Carla Bruni, wife of President Nicolas Sarkozy.

The last of these was the subject of controversy when Karl Laske and Laurent Valdiguié published a book Vrai Canard, which alleged that the spoof diary was written by Pierre Charon, a political advisor to the French government, and used to pass on political messages. The editor of Le Canard enchaîné, Michel Gaillard, quickly debunked this claim by naming Frédéric Pagès as the writer.

== "Botulism" ==
Pagès has written two books of spoof philosophy under the name of a fictional philosopher, Jean-Baptiste Botul:

- La vie sexuelle d'Emmanuel Kant [The Sex Life of Emmanuel Kant]. Éditions Mille et une nuits. 1999. ISBN 2-84205-424-5.
- Nietzsche ou le démon de midi [Nietzsche, or The Midday Demon]. Éditions Mille et une nuits. 2004. ISBN 2-84205-873-9.

He founded the "Association of Friends of Jean-Baptiste Botul" to promote this fictitious philosopher and his school of "Botulism". In 2010, the hoax caught out the well-known TV philosopher Bernard-Henri Lévy, whose book De la guerre en philosophie used Botul as the primary source for his attack on Kant.
