= Asterix in Corsica =

Comic book album

Asterix in Corsica (Astérix en Corse)
- Date: 1979
- Series: Asterix

Creative team
- Writers: Rene Goscinny
- Artists: Albert Uderzo

Original publication
- Date of publication: 1973
- Language: French

Chronology
- Preceded by: Asterix and the Soothsayer
- Followed by: Asterix and Caesar's Gift

Asterix in Corsica (French: Astérix en Corse) is the twentieth volume of the Asterix comic book series, by René Goscinny (stories) and Albert Uderzo (artwork). It was originally serialized in Pilote issues 687–708 in 1973. It is the best-selling title in the history of the series, owing to its sales in the French market, but is one of the least-selling titles in the English language.

== Plot summary ==
Unlike most editions of the series, the map that is shown before the story begins does not present Gaul and a close-up of the village with the four surrounding Roman camps. Instead the reader is shown a map of Corsica and a multitude of camps around the coastline.

The story begins with a banquet celebrating the anniversary of Vercingetorix's victory at the Battle of Gergovia. As part of the celebrations, the indomitable Gauls always attack the local Roman camps; as a result, the Roman soldiers always go on "special manoeuvres" en masse to avoid the punch-up. On this particular year various people who have helped the Gauls against the Romans in previous books have been invited along with their wives (this may be because this was the last story published in Pilote magazine, or because this was the 20th album). They include:

- Petitsuix from Helvetia (Asterix in Switzerland),
- Huevos Y Bacon and son Pepe from Hispania (Asterix in Spain),
- Instantmix, the Gaulish restaurateur from Rome (Asterix the Gladiator),
- Anticlimax from Britain alongside Dipsomaniax the tavern-keeper, McAnix the Scotsman, O'veroptimistix the Irishman, and Chief Mykingdomforanos (Asterix in Britain),
- Drinklikafix of Massalia, Jellibabix of Lugdunum, Seniorservix from Gesocribatum (Asterix and the Banquet),
- Winesanspirix and his wife from Gergovia (Asterix and the Chieftain's Shield).

The Roman camp of Totorum, too, has visitors: three Roman soldiers escorting the Corsican leader Boneywasawarriorwayayix, exiled by Praetor Perfidius. He is left to spend the night in the Centurion's tent, to its owner's dismay. While the other camps are deserted, the Romans of Totorum have no option but to stay and be decimated by the Gauls and their friends, who discover Boneywasawarriorwayayix awakening from a long siesta (afternoon nap).

The proud Boneywasawarriorwayayix attends the Gaulish banquet and leaves the next day for Corsica with Asterix, Obelix and Dogmatix accompanying him. At Massalia, he hires a ship crewed by none other than the pirates. When the passengers go aboard it is too dark for the captain and the Gauls to recognise each other. But when, in the middle of the night, the pirates attempt to rob the Corsican and his three companions, they recognize the sleeping Gauls and the entire crew vacates the ship in a rowing boat.

The following morning, the passengers awake to find the ship is deserted. Boneywasawarriorwayayix then invites the Gauls to share a pungent Corsican cheese. Unaccustomed to the strong smell, they feel unwell, but then the Corsican realises that they are off the coast of his native island, abandons the cheese and excitedly swims ashore.

The arrival of the three men and dog is noticed by a Roman patrol. The Romans later investigate the ship but find nothing suspicious. As they leave, the pirates arrive to reclaim their vessel, only for a burning torch to ignite the Corsican cheese's fumes, blowing up the ship.

A keen young Roman called Courtingdisastus captures the pirate captain and takes him to Praetor Perfidius in the Roman city of Aleria. From him, the Romans learn that Boneywasawarriorwayayix, a known revolutionary leader, has returned from exile. Perfidius appoints Courtingdisastus to lead a party assigned to recapture Boneywasawarriorwayayix. But in fact, Perfidius has few illusions that the mission will be successful and starts making his own plans to flee Corsica, leaving his men in the lurch and sailing away with all the loot he has purloined from the Corsicans.

Courtingdisastus and his men go to Boneywasawarriorwayayix's village, but are faced by his second-in-command Carferrix, who intimidates them into fleeing. Meanwhile, the Corsican leader and the Gauls travel through the maquis to a rendezvous where several clan chieftains gather to plan their attack on Aleria to recover the wealth the Praetor has extracted from them.

The attack begins before Perfidius can make his escape. Boneywasawarriorwayayix then makes a proud and defiant speech stating that Corsica will never be ruled by an Emperor unless he is a Corsican himself.

After the victory over the Romans, a vendetta between the clans of Boneywasawarriorwayayix and Olabellamargaritix, fought over various but complicated age-old issues, is settled by the diplomatic Asterix. (However, when the Gauls leave, there are strong hints that other Corsican chieftains will resume the feud with Olabellamargaritix even if Boneywasawarriorwayayix has called his off).

The Gauls return home with fond memories of their trip.

== Commentary ==
- Throughout the album the stereotypical laziness of the Corsicans is satirized, often in combination with their well known siesta.

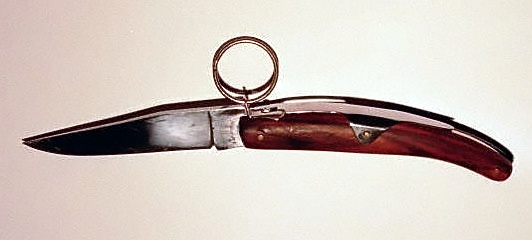
A vendetta knife, similar to those used in Corsica.

- The importance to Corsicans of honor and respect is satirized several times, as are their vendettas and fights. The knives they use are authentic vendetta knives.
- In the original French version, Boneywasawarriorwayayix is called Ocatarinetabellachitchix. Asterix at one point pronounces his name incorrectly as "O Marinella..." Both are songs by Corsican singer Tino Rossi: "Tchi-Tchi" and "Marinella". Further, in the comic strip, the secret password the Gauls need to give in order to get on the ship that will bring them to Corsica is also a reference to Rossi. "Vieni vieni" (in the French version) is also a song by Rossi.
- Ballot boxes being stuffed before the election starts is a reference to Corsican election fraud scandals.
- Wild pigs, chestnuts (used in many dishes and drinks on the island), old people sitting on benches commenting on things happening in their environment, and the notorious smell of Corsican cheese are referenced. This cheese is the infamous casgiu merzu which can be identified by the maggots springing away from the cheese as Boneywasawarriorwayayix attempts to slice it.
- The famous bushes (maquis) where in past centuries many highwaymen and Corsican nationalists hid are referenced. It is also notorious as a place where tourists easily get lost.
- The Corsican emperor Napoleon Bonaparte is referenced in:
  - The English name for Ocatarinetabellachitchix: "Boneywasawarriorwayayix", which is a reference to the sea chanty "Boney was a warrior" about Napoleon. (When Asterix mistakes his name in the English version he addresses him as "Wellingtonwasa...", a reference to Napoleon's British enemy Arthur Wellesley, 1st Duke of Wellington.)
  - Boneywasawarriorwayayix discovers Corsica is nearby by tasting the smell. Napoleon once said he could recognize his island with his eyes closed, just by smelling its scent. Even during his exile in Elba he could still remember the scent.
  - Asterix's remark that the Corsicans have "une grande armée" ("a large army") is a reference to the nickname for Napoleon's army.
  - Boneywasawarriorwayayix's remark that "le sommeil d'Osterlix" is very famous in their country (Osterlix is a Corsican clan leader in the album. "Le sommeil" means "the sleep". The sentence is a pun on "Le soleil d' Austerlitz" ("The sun of Austerlitz", named after Napoleon's famous victory in the Battle of Austerlitz)
  - And finally in Boneywasawarriorwayayix's speech towards Perfidius where he strikes the famous Napoleon pose and says "that Corsicans will only accept an emperor if he's Corsican".
- Boneywasawarriorwayayix is a caricature of the Corsican journalist Paul Gianolli.
- Roman Centurion Hippopotamus, of the camp where Boneywasawarriorwayayix is held, is based on Goscinny and Uderzo's friend Pierre Tchernia who also appeared in other stories.
- The stereotypes of Corsicans seen in the album (pride, vendetta, feuds, old men sitting and commenting, grim glares) are thought to apply also to the Cretans; Greek publishers Mamouthcomix released a special translation of the album in Cretan Greek. In the original Serbian edition of the episode, Corsicans speak in typical dialect of Montenegro, for similar reasons.
- For the first time in the series, children of the major characters are presented, with Fulliautomatix' son starting a row about fish with Unhygenix' son while in the company of several other unnamed children.

== In other languages ==
- Afrikaans: Asterix in Korsika
- Arabic: أستريكس فى جزيرة كورسيكا
- Catalan: Astèrix a Còrsega
- Corsican: Asterix in Corsica
- Croatian: Asterix na Korzici
- Czech: Asterix na Korsice
- Cretan Greek: Ο Αστερικάκης στην Κορσική
- Danish: Asterix på Korsika
- Dutch: Asterix op Corsica
- German: Asterix auf Korsika
- Greek: Ο Αστερίξ στην Κορσική
- French: Astérix en Corse
- Finnish: Asterix Korsikassa
- Italian: Asterix in Corsica
- Norwegian: Asterix på Korsika
- Polish: Asteriks na Korsyce
- Portuguese: Astérix na Córsega
- Serbian: Aстерикс на Корзици/Asteriks na Korzici
- Slovenian: Asterix na Korziki
- Spanish: Astérix en Córcega
- Swedish: Asterix på Korsika
- Turkish: Asteriks Korsika'da
