= Asterix in Lusitania =

2025 French comic album

Asterix in Lusitania (Astérix en Lusitanie)
- Date: October 28, 2025
- Series: Asterix

Creative team
- Writer: Fabcaro
- Artist: Didier Conrad

Original publication
- Date of publication: October 23, 2025
- Language: French

Translation
- Date: October 28, 2025
- Translator: Adriana Hunter

Chronology
- Preceded by: Asterix and the White Iris

Asterix in Lusitania is the forty-first album in the Asterix series. It is the second story to be written by Fabcaro and the seventh to be drawn by Didier Conrad, and was published on 23 October 2025.

== Plot ==
One day, Ekonomikrisis arrives at the Gaulish village carrying a passenger: a Lusitanian named Randomaxess, a former slave from the workforce for the Mansions of the Gods, who wants to ask the Gauls for help. Randomaxess states that his friend Umaminess, who produces a garum much loved by Julius Caesar, has been unjustly accused of trying to poison the latter and is about to be thrown to the lions. In fact, the poisoning attempt was masterminded by the Roman governor of Lusitania, Upwardlimobilus, with the aid of a local collaborateur named Fethermyness. By framing Umaminess, Upwardlimobilus hopes to promote his cousin Croesus Lupus' garum business, thus incurring Caesar's favor, getting himself promoted, and finally ascending to dictator after Caesar has met an unfortunate "accident".

Outraged, Vitalstatistix sends Asterix and Obelix to Lusitania to set things right, with Ekonomikrisis offering them a lift. After a very brief meeting with the Pirates, the Gauls and Randomaxess arrive at the latter's home village of Josemarina, where they meet Umaminess' distressed daughter Oxala. After resting in the village for the night, Asterix and Obelix travel to Olisipo (present-day Lisbon), where Umaminess is imprisoned, and investigate the dock warehouse where his garum was stored for its transport to Rome. There, Asterix notes how Croesus Lupus' garum supply now occupies most of the storage space, and he decides to pay him a visit. However, the Gauls are overheard by Fethermyness, who runs off to warn Upwardlimobilus and his henchman centurion Extraneus.

Asterix and Obelix go to Lupus' office, only to learn that he's currently not present, and as they exit the building, they are attacked by Extraneus and a troop of legionaries. After beating them up, they learn that a bounty has been placed on their heads, forcing them to travel in secret. They proceed to the prison, where they re-encounter two Gaulish tourists they met on the road to Olisipo, Oldogotrix and his wife Perlclutcha, who disguise them as Lusitanians. Infiltrating the facility by posing as new prison cooks, they meet with Umaminess, who informs them of Upwardlimobilus' role in the plot. With the help of Bouillabess, one of the prison cooks, they meet Nellia Furtado, whose family runs a restaurant and is regularly indentured into catering for Upwardlimobilus' orgies. One of these parties, exclusively for rich industrialists, is to take place the very next day on the governor's pleasure galley, for the occasion of Caesar's visit to Lusitania.

In order to both exonerate Umaminess and expose Upwardlimobilus, Asterix tricks Fethermyness into getting him and Obelix an invitation to the party by having Oldogotrix and Perlclutcha pose as wealthy businesspeople, and him and Obelix as their bodyguards. At the party the next evening, Asterix instructs Nellia to ply Fethermyness with a lot of wine. Once the snitch is drunk, Asterix tricks him into yelling out the truth about Upwardlimobilus' conspiracy at full volume, right in front of Upwardlimobilus and Caesar. The resulting brawl with Upwardlimoblilus' guards is quickly halted by Caesar, who has Upwardlimobilus, Croesus Lupus and Fethermyness arrested and Umaminess reinstalled as his primary garum supplier. After celebrating with their Lusitanian friends, Asterix and Obelix return to their village for the traditional triumphal feast.

== Trivia ==
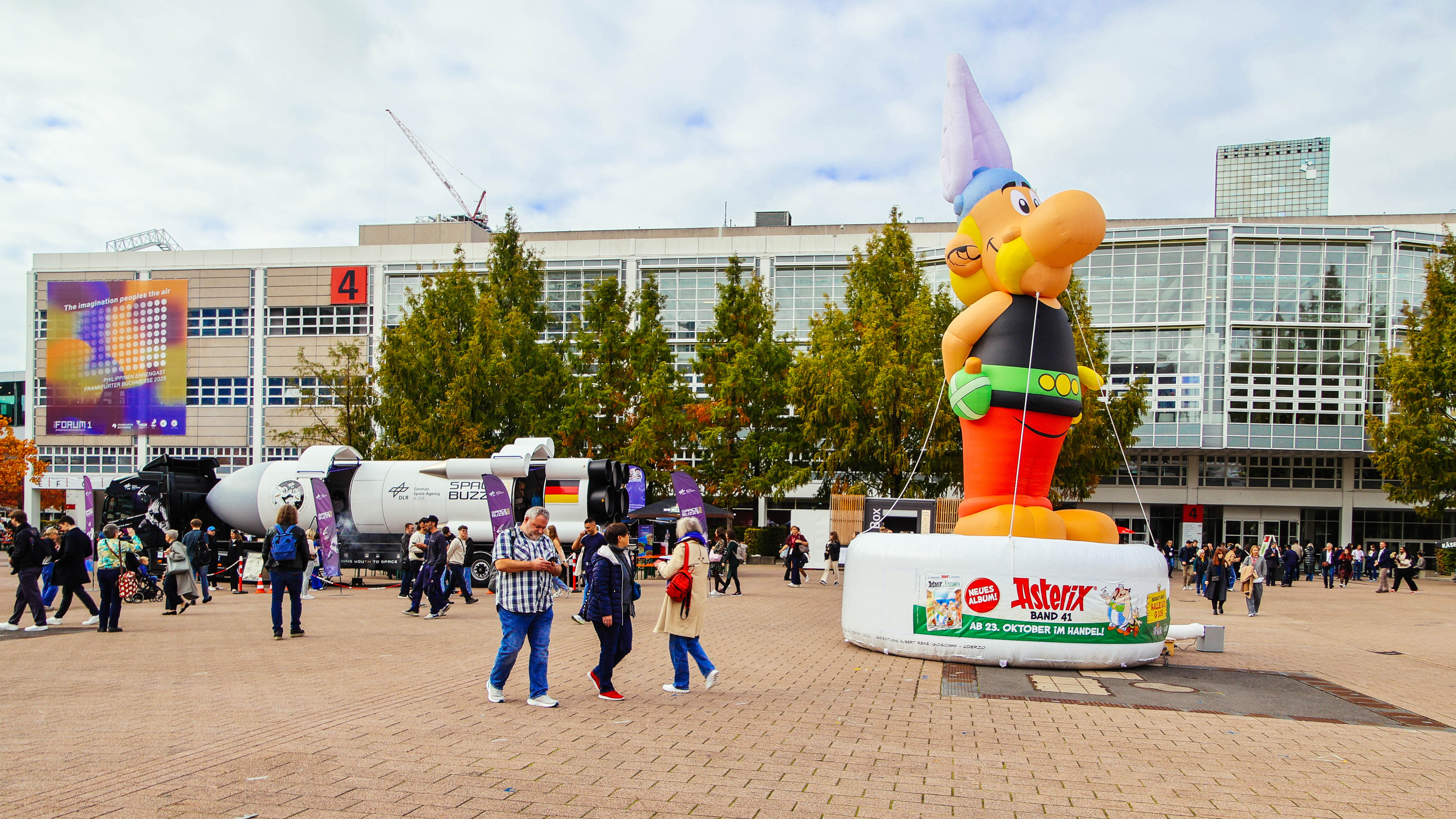
- Promotion for the 41st album at the Frankfurt Book Fair
  Didier Conrad based the Lusitanians' design on the work of Albert Uderzo in The Mansions of the Gods and in Asterix and the Chariot Race and used traditional Portuguese folkloric costumes as models for the females' costumes. A provisional cover for the book, shown in March of 2025, showed the three main protagonists standing on a Portuguese pavement painting representing two codfish.
- One month before the album's release, a teaser page was published which shows Asterix and Obelix getting interviewed about the upcoming story.
- Randomaxess ("Boulquiès in the original French version) was first seen as a nameless extra in The Mansions of the Gods scene where Squaronthehypotenus' slave workforce attempts to shirk their nighttime tree-felling job.
- The story's first panel contains a minor continuity error. In that scene Getafix states that he is still getting rock oil from Ekonomikrisis, which he used as a chief ingredient for his magic potion up until the events of Asterix and the Black Gold, where he replaced it with beetroot juice.
- When Asterix's troupe arrives in Lusitania, Randomaxess calls their landing area "Bem-Vindos". Bem-Vindos means "Welcome" and is also part of the name of a Portuguese television series.
- Throughout the story, puns are made on saudade, calçada Portuguese, pastel de nata, the companies Esso and FTSE, with an added "C", (Note: In the European Portuguese translation, these are replaced with ProtoGalp, a clear pun on Galp Energia, and PSI 20 respectively.) and the Carnation Revolution.
- Singer Nelly Furtado is referenced through a character named Nellia Furtado, and, in the British English translation, a delicatessen named Deli Furtado. The US English name "Vas & Co" for Deli Furtado is a pun on Vasco da Gama.
- During the final fight scene, Nellia is seen imitating the painting La Liberté Guidant le Peuple and (in the English version) singing about Ferdinand Magellan and Fernando Pessoa.
- Near the tavern Deli Furtado, there is a small child playing football wearing the colors of the Portuguese football team, who resembles a young Cristiano Ronaldo.
- The character Upwardlimobilus was also known as Richascroesus in other English translations. This is a reference to the idiom "as rich as Croesus."
- The album makes multiple references to Viriathus, known in Portuguese as Viriato, a shepherd (or hunter) turned military leader resisting Roman incursion during the Lusitanian Wars.
