= Marjorie Conrad =

French-American model and filmmaker

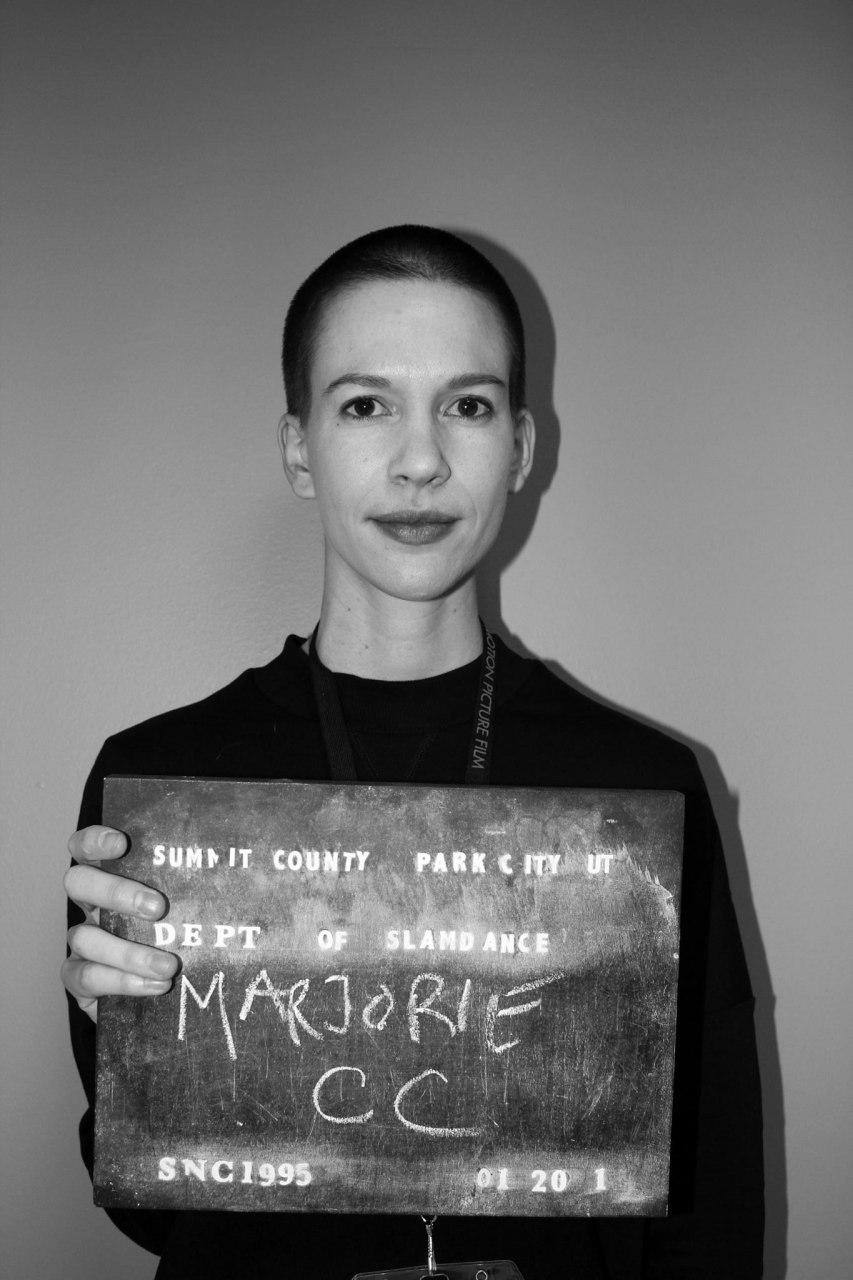
- Conrad at the 2016 Slamdance Film Festival
- Born: October 1, 1988 (age 37); Marseille, France
- Education: San Francisco State University
- Occupations: Filmmaker; model
- Years active: 2008–present
- Parent(s): Didier Conrad; Sophie Commenge
- Modeling information
- Height: 5 ft 11 in (1.80 m)
- Hair color: Brown
- Eye color: Brown
- Website: www.marjorie-conrad.com

Marjorie Conrad (born October 1, 1988) is a French-American filmmaker and model. She is known for being the eleventh eliminated contestant in the eleventh cycle of America's Next Top Model, and for her feature films Body Issues (2023), Desire Path (2020), and Chemical Cut (2016).

== Personal life ==
Conrad was born in Marseille to French parents Didier Conrad, a graphic novel artist of Swiss origin, and Sophie Commenge, a graphic novel scenarist of partial Italian ancestry. When she was eight years old, the family left France and relocated to Los Angeles, California after her father began working on the film The Road to El Dorado (2000) with DreamWorks Studio. Conrad and her brother did not learn English until beginning public schooling in California.

Conrad attended school in the Los Angeles Unified School District, and began pursuing filmmaking as a middle schooler. She then attended Cleveland High School and San Francisco State University, where she graduated summa cum laude with a degree in film production in 2011.

== Career ==
=== America's Next Top Model ===
In 2008, Conrad was scouted at the San Francisco State University campus bookstore for the eleventh cycle of America's Next Top Model.

After being the fourth contestant (after Sheena Sakai, Lio Tipton, and Nikeysha Clarke) selected as a cast member, Conrad was never placed below seventh. Her portfolio frequently garnered much praise from the judges. Conrad received two first call-outs which were both shot by photographer Mike Rosenthal (i.e. portraying the political issue of immigration during the voting-themed photoshoot in week one and embodying an award show mishap inspired by Tyra's Fiercee Awards in a dramatic photoshoot in week six).

She also won two challenges (i.e. her high-fashion take on the "Hunchback from Notre-Dame" impressed Tyra Banks during the Signature Pose Challenge, winning her diamonds at Rafinity Jewelry valued at 12k in week six and the commercial shoot challenge with model Mark Vanderloo judged by Paulina Porizkova where she was rewarded with a 10k shopping spree at G-Star Raw in week ten). Conrad during both her challenge wins chose to split and share the prize evenly with her friend and fellow contestant Tipton.

In week seven, challenge winner Elina Ivanova chose Conrad and Tipton to feature in a Seventeen Magazine holiday photoshoot.

Conrad survived her first-ever bottom two appearance over Ivanova who was eliminated in her third consecutive bottom two appearance in week nine. The judges eliminated Conrad eleventh in Amsterdam during her second consecutive bottom two appearance which Samantha Potter had survived for the second time.

=== Other Modeling ===
Post-Top Model, Conrad resumed her studies at San Francisco State University and signed with Look Model Agency from 2009–2011. Modeling credits included a cover and spreads in Fantasticsmag, opening a Marciano runway show, walking for the Parc 55 Hotel opening show, closing and a video shoot for the San Francisco Art Institute graduation show, several shoots and shows for diPietro Todd Salon, multiple shoots for Edo Salon, a shoot for Atelier Emmanuel, a trade show with Gina Khan Salon, in-store modeling for Neiman Marcus, and a video shoot for Macy's West and MAC Cosmetics. She has worked with San Francisco photographers Aubrey Trinnaman, Hideki Owa, Billy Winters, Tara Chumpelik, Christian Pollock, Tara Arrowood, Cody Rasmussen, RC Rivera, Jean-Baptiste Petispas, and Brittany McCall.

=== Film ===
Her 2011 graduate thesis film Limehouse won the Audience Award at the Juried Previews for the SFSU 51st Film Finals, was selected to close the Film Finals screening, won Best Narrative at the Excelsior Short Film Festival, and was praised by Sundance Feature Film Program Manager Cullen Conly. The short narrative film focused on San Francisco and featured legendary transgender pioneer Vicki Marlane in a rare and classic rendition of Lisa Kirk's Limehouse Blues.

After graduating with honors in 2011, Conrad moved from San Francisco to Los Angeles and set out to write her first feature script while working as a receptionist at World of Wonder Productions. It was there that she met her future cast members, including the late Ian Coster (son of Days of Our Lives actor Nicolas Coster, also performing in the film), Michael Lucid, Deven Green, David Keeps, and Stephen Saban, co-founder of Details. She fully funded the film using her earnings from World of Wonder, teaming up with SFSU alums Barret Hacia (Producer) and Mackenzie Mathis (Cinematographer). Conrad wore many hats for the project: writer, director, lead actress, executive producer, and editor.

Her surreal debut feature, titled Chemical Cut, world premiered at the top-tier 2016 Slamdance Film Festival as an Official Selection in the Narrative Competition. Marjorie was one of only two female directors accepted in the 2016 Narrative Feature lineup. In her dark comedy, "Irene, a 23-year-old artistic misfit, pursues a modeling career to escape her dead-end retail job but is quickly disillusioned by the cutthroat nature of the Los Angeles fashion world. Searching for identity and a kindred spirit while surrounded by competition, absurdity, and so many nude bras, Irene flounders until a mysterious woman's performance ignites her imagination." Programmer Marie Jamora explained, "Writer/Director/Editor/Lead Actress Marjorie Conrad developed the story from her own experience as a former model, and she shows us a world where mannequins are treated better than real women, verbal molestation is palpable, and the scariest predators of pretty girls are the other pretty girls." Chemical Cut had a positive critical reception, including the following favorable reviews from Hammer To Nail, Film Colossus, Beyond Chron, The Film Stage, Eat Drink Films, and Slug Magazine. The following interviews with the cast and crew were conducted by Twitch Film, World of Wonder hosted by James St. James, Film Colossus, The Park Record, The Art of Monteque, Screen Prism, Serving Cinema, Filmmaker Magazine, and MovieMaker Magazine. Other local radio and television interviews were conducted by Entertainment Journal, Park City Television, KPCW Radio, KXRK 96 Radio, Attention Deficit, UNLV Rebel Yell, P3 Update, International Screenwriting Association, and Examiner. The film was singled out as a festival highlight by AMFM Magazine, Variety, Twitch Film, Hammer To Nail, and The Davis Clipper, and the festival trailer was initially released on Indiewire. Filmmaker Magazine called the film "beguiling" and "intriguing," Slug Magazine described it as "a beautifully wrought film of the often fraught search for identity" and argued "the film manages to deftly explore questions of identity and creativity—perhaps drawing from Conrad's own experiences—through opulent shots, outrageous characters and an exquisite backdrop of heightened reality." While at the festival, Recreation Media secured the film's international rights. It screened at the ArcLight Hollywood on May 10, 2016 and the ArcLight Chicago on May 18, 2016 as part of the Slamdance Cinema Club. The film was nominated for the Indie Spirit Award and won the Female Eye Filmmaking Award at The New Hope Film Festival. It was an Official Selection at the 2016 Buffalo International Film Festival in the Domestic and ArtHouse Feature category. Marjorie was interviewed for BIFFX by actress Tilke Hill as part of a Women in Film panel with feature directors Stavroula Toska (Beneath The Olive Tree) and Victoria Negri (Gold Star). Chemical Cut was released on Amazon Prime Video and Marjorie Conrad's YouTube Channel.

Conrad's second feature film, Desire Path, premiered at the 2020 Mammoth Lakes Film Festival and won the Audience Award for Best Narrative Feature. Notable cast include Otto von Schirach and Amy Deanna. Film critic, curator, and artist Nikola Gocić cited Desire Path as one of his cinematic favorites of 2020, an "uncompromising sophomore feature–a deliberately paced, relentlessly elliptical and formally adventurous de(con)struction of the vampire subgenre." Gocić subsequently praised the 2021 version of the film: "Marjorie Conrad's grimly sensual mood piece–one of the finest experimental features I saw last year–gets a condensed, yet even more daring version which emphasizes the film's 'tactility'. And when I say 'tactility', I don't refer to it only in its literal sense, but also as in 'a half-remembered dream that gently touches your psyche before veiling it in uncanny ethereality'..." The 2021 version of Desire Path was released on Amazon Prime Video; both the 2020 and 2021 versions were released on Marjorie Conrad's YouTube channel.

Conrad's formally daring third feature, Body Issues, makes innovative use of body cam footage, a lack of visible human faces, and "an unreliable narrator as the only guide." It debuted at the 2023 Cine-Excess Film Festival in the UK, exploring "physical and familial alienation" central to the festival's theme. In his review, Nikola Gocić commends the film's bold, raw, and essayistic experimentation that "constantly keeps you guessing," describing the film as "a heavy dream in which you're enveloped in darkness, and lost in a place you can't recognize," its nightmarish atmosphere reminiscent of "Philippe Grandrieux and David Lynch (in the Inland Empire element)." The film was also programmed at the 2023 Bridge Film and Video Festival, the 2023 BizarroLand Film Festival, and the 2024 New Jersey Film Festival.

Conrad's mid-length experimental documentary, The Joyless Economy, was an official selection at the 2026 Cannes Film Festival, in the Directors' Fortnight section.

== Filmography ==
=== Film ===
Film
Year	Title	Role	Festival Screenings	Notes / Awards
2011	Limehouse	Director / Writer / Producer / Editor	SFSU 51st Film Finals	Audience Award
2011	Limehouse	Director / Writer / Producer / Editor	SFSU 51st Film Finals	Closed Film Finals
2011	Limehouse	Director / Writer / Producer / Editor	2011 Excelsior Short Film Festival	Best Narrative Award
2016	Chemical Cut	Director / Writer / Producer / Editor / Lead Actress	2016 Slamdance Film Festival	Official Selection – Narrative Competition
2016	Chemical Cut	Director / Writer / Producer / Editor / Lead Actress	2016 Slamdance Film Festival	Best Narrative Feature Award (Nominee)
2016	Chemical Cut	Director / Writer / Producer / Editor / Lead Actress	2016 New Hope Film Festival	Official Selection
2016	Chemical Cut	Director / Writer / Producer / Editor / Lead Actress	2016 New Hope Film Festival	Female Eye Filmmaking Award
2016	Chemical Cut	Director / Writer / Producer / Editor / Lead Actress	2016 New Hope Film Festival	Indie Spirit Award (Nominee)
2016	Chemical Cut	Director / Writer / Producer / Editor / Lead Actress	2016 Buffalo International Film Festival	Official Selection
2020	Desire Path (Festival Cut)	Director / Writer / Producer / Editor	2020 Mammoth Lakes Film Festival	World Premiere
2020	Desire Path (Festival Cut)	Director / Writer / Producer / Editor	2020 Mammoth Lakes Film Festival	Audience Award
2021	Desire Path (Final Cut)	Director / Writer / Producer / Editor	2024 New Jersey Film Festival Concert Series	Official Selection
2021	Desire Path (Final Cut)	Director / Writer / Producer / Editor	2025 Festival Fotogenia	Official Selection
2023	Body Issues	Director / Writer / Producer / Cinematographer / Actress / Editor / Sound Designer	2023 Cine-Excess Film Festival	Official Selection
2023	Body Issues	Director / Writer / Producer / Cinematographer / Actress / Editor / Sound Designer	2023 Bridge Film and Video Festival	Official Selection – Opening Film
2023	Body Issues	Director / Writer / Producer / Cinematographer / Actress / Editor / Sound Designer	2023 BizarroLand Film Festival	Official Selection – Closing Film
2023	Body Issues	Director / Writer / Producer / Cinematographer / Actress / Editor / Sound Designer	2023 Polish International Film Festival	Official Selection
2023	Body Issues	Director / Writer / Producer / Cinematographer / Actress / Editor / Sound Designer	2024 New Jersey Film Festival	Official Selection
2023	Body Issues	Director / Writer / Producer / Cinematographer / Actress / Editor / Sound Designer	2024 New Jersey Film Festival	Best Experimental Film Award
2023	Body Issues	Director / Writer / Producer / Cinematographer / Actress / Editor / Sound Designer	2024 New Jersey Film Festival	Festival Director's Citation Awards for Best Screenplay, Best Cinematography, Best Editing, and Best Music
2023	Body Issues	Director / Writer / Producer / Cinematographer / Actress / Editor / Sound Designer	2024 ReelHeart International Film Festival	Official Selection
2023	Body Issues	Director / Writer / Producer / Cinematographer / Actress / Editor / Sound Designer	2024 ReelHeart International Film Festival	Best Experimental Film Award
2023	Body Issues	Director / Writer / Producer / Cinematographer / Actress / Editor / Sound Designer	2024 ReelHeart International Film Festival	Best Editing Award (Nominee)
2026	The Joyless Economy	Director / Writer / Producer / Cinematographer / Editor / Sound Designer	2026 Cannes Film Festival, Directors' Fortnight	Official Selection

=== Television ===
Television
Year	Title	Role	Episode #	Notes / Awards
2008	America's Next Top Model (Cycle 11)	Self	2 – Top Model Inauguration	1st Place Photo Call-Out, shot by Mike Rosenthal
2008	America's Next Top Model (Cycle 11)	Self	7 – The Fiercee Awards	1st Place Photo Call-Out, shot by Mike Rosenthal
2008	America's Next Top Model (Cycle 11)	Self	7 – The Fiercee Awards	Won Reward Challenge – Best Signature Pose, shot by Tyra Banks
2008	America's Next Top Model (Cycle 11)	Self	12 – Good Times and Windmills	Finished 4th
2008	America's Next Top Model (Cycle 11)	Self	12 – Good Times and Windmills	Won Reward Challenge – Commercial Shoot with Mark Vanderloo
