= Asterix and the Magic Carpet =

28th volume of the Asterix comic book series

Asterix and the Magic Carpet (Astérix chez Rahàzade)
- Date: 1988
- Series: Asterix

Creative team
- Writers: Albert Uderzo
- Artists: Albert Uderzo

Original publication
- Date of publication: 1987
- Language: French

Chronology
- Preceded by: Asterix and Son
- Followed by: Asterix and the Secret Weapon

Asterix and the Magic Carpet is the twenty-eighth volume of the Asterix comic book series by René Goscinny (stories) and Albert Uderzo (illustrations). It was first published in 1987, and was translated into English in 1988. It is the fourth Asterix album to be published after the death of René Goscinny in 1977 and is thus both written and drawn by Albert Uderzo alone.

The full original French title was Astérix chez Rahàzade ou Le compte des mille et une heures (Asterix meets Orinjade or the 1001 Hours Countdown), a reference to Queen Scheherazade who tells the famous 1001 Nights collection of stories.

== Plot summary ==
Following the rebuilding of the Gaulish village after Brutus' attack in the previous story, Chief Vitalstatistix is trying to give a speech, when he is interrupted by the bard Cacofonix, whose song causes rain. This introduces Watziznehm the fakir, who falls from his flying carpet. Watziznehm explains he was searching for the village because he needs to make it rain in his country, a kingdom in the Ganges Valley, within the following 1001 hours, otherwise Princess Orinjade, daughter of Rajah Watzit, will be sacrificed to the gods. This prophecy is part of an evil scheme by Grand Vizier Hoodunnit, to seize the throne.

Vitalstatistix agrees to send the rain-making Cacofonix to India, accompanied by Asterix, Obelix, and Dogmatix. All five mount the flying carpet; but their journey is often interrupted either by Obelix's insistence on stopping for food, by Cacofonix's attempts to sing, and once by a lightning strike which forces them to replace the carpet. The Gauls eventually arrive in India with exactly 30 hours, 30 minutes, and 30 seconds to save Orinjade; but Cacofonix has lost his voice during the journey, and Rajah Wotzit's doctors proclaim that to regain his voice, Cacofonix must take an overnight bath in a combination of elephant milk, dung and hair. Accordingly, the Gauls and Watziznehm take Cacofonix to elephant-trainer Howdoo and set up the bath; but Hoodunnit sends his henchmen to kidnap the bard and take him to an elephants' graveyard to be trampled by the wild elephant herd.

Watziznehm, Asterix and Obelix set out to rescue the bard, but they are stopped by Owzat, Hoodunnit's fakir sidekick. While Watziznehm and Owzat curse each other, Asterix and Obelix escape to Howdoo, with whom they embark to the elephants' graveyard. After delays by tigers, monkeys, a rhinoceros and Hoodunnit's henchmen, they find Cacofonix alive and well, his smell having placated the elephants. Meanwhile, Watziznehm defeats Owzat and recovers the Gauls on his flying carpet.

At the execution grounds, Asterix saves Orinjade, while Watziznehm intercepts Hoodunnit. Cacofonix recovers his voice after a dose of magic potion, and sings, causing rain. At the victory feast in the palace, Obelix surmises that his fellow villagers might be having their customary banquet, this time without him. This is proven true; and at the banquet, some of the Gauls begin to express a desire to retrieve the bard, in fear of a drought, and Fulliautomatix the blacksmith, Cacofonix's habitual menace, appears to be missing him.

== Introducing ==
- Watziznehm – the fakir
- Watzit – the rajah
- Orinjade – the princess
- Hoodunnit – the scheming Grand Vizier
- Owzat – Hoodunnit's fakir henchman
- Howdoo – the elephant man

== Commentary ==
- An audiobook of Asterix and the Magic Carpet adapted by Anthea Bell and narrated by Willie Rushton was released on EMI Records' Listen for Pleasure label in 1988.
- This is the first reference to India in an Asterix book. Although some things are depicted in historical fashion (the Rigvedic deities, for example), many of the architectural details and styles of clothing are distinctly Islamic, as is the concept of a fakir. Islam was not brought to India until the late 11th century CE.
- As in Asterix in Switzerland and Asterix and Son, this volume has a rare dramatic overtone by the heroes' need to rescue an innocent from impending death.
- Orinjade's name is a play on the soft drink Orangeade. In the original French version the princess is called Rahàzade. The title of the comic is thus; "Astérix chez Rahàzade" ("Asterix meets Rahàzade"): a pun on the famous storyteller Scheherazade who told the 1001 Arabian nights stories.
- The gag that Cacofonix's singing induces rain was used for the first time in this album. It later appears in Asterix and the Secret Weapon.
- When Cacofonix sings in Vitalstatistix's hut, it begins to rain indoors (causing an angry Impedimenta to chase them outside). However, when he first sings in his own hut, it rains all over the village. (This can possibly be explained by Cacofonix sticking his head out a rear window of his hut, although the illustrations do not state this explicitly.)
- In the original French version Cacofonix (on page 18) starts singing a song "confused with another comic strip", according to the accompanying text. The song is indeed Bianca Castafiore's famous "jewels" aria from Charles Gounod's Faust, which she sings often in the Belgian comic strip The Adventures of Tintin.
- On page 23, the princess asks her handmaiden (named "Lemuhnade" in the English translation) "if she sees anything arriving", while awaiting the Gauls' arrival. This is a reference to the fairy tale of Bluebeard where Bluebeard's wife asks the same thing of her sister, while waiting for her brothers to rescue her.
- On page 29 Asterix, Obelix and Cacofonix eat caviar, "just a meal for poor people", according to the cooks. This is a reference to the fact that nowadays only rich people eat it.
- When Cacofonix sings in his own hut, after Watziznehm has crash-landed in the village, the song is "Raindrops Keep Fallin' on My Head" by B.J. Thomas.
- Hoodunnit makes a reference to another Goscinny character, Iznogoud, as his cousin and borrows his catchphrase by declaring that he will be Rajah instead of the Rajah. (page 43)
- Upon recovering his voice, Cacofonix sings Singin' in the Rain by Arthur Freed and Nacio Herb Brown. (In the English translation, he instead performs Feste's Song from Shakespeare's Twelfth Night.)
- Orinjade is one of the few to express a liking for Cacofonix's music; the others being Justforkix in Asterix and the Normans and Pepe in Asterix in Spain.
- When Owzat stops Watziznehm from passing, Obelix says "Not out": a reference to the sport of cricket, wherein bowlers appeal thus to the umpire. Cricket is extremely popular in India.
- When Orinjade is taken to be executed, the public call out the countdown, and Asterix and Co. rescue the princess when the count reaches zero; a reference to the development of the number zero in ancient India.
- As Watziznehm is a fakir, his avoidance of all luxury is frequently referred to. At a feast along the way from Gaul to India, Obelix eats a whole camel while Watziznehm is content with a single egg of caviar.
- The name Watziznehm may be a reference to the Salman Rushdie novel Midnights Children in which the narrators grandmother frequently uses the verbal tick "whatsitsname" in her speech.

== In other languages ==
- Ancient Greek: Αστερίκιος παρά Σακχαραζάδι
- Catalan: Astèrix a l'Índia
- Croatian: Asterix i leteći sag
- Czech: Asterix a Rahazáda
- Danish: Asterix i Østens fagre riger
- Dutch: Asterix in Indus-land
- Finnish: Asterix Intiassa – Tuhannen ja yhden tunnin matka (Asterix in India – The Thousand-and-One-Hour Journey)
- German: Asterix im Morgenland
- Greek: Ο Αστερίξ και η Χαλαλίμα
- Indonesian: Asterix dan Putri Rahazade
- Italian: Le mille e un'ora di Asterix
- Latin Asterix Orientalis
- Norwegian: Asterix og det flygende teppet
- Persian: استریکس و قالیچه ایرانی
- Polish: Asteriks u Reszehezady
- Portuguese: As 1001 horas de Astérix
- Russian: Астерикс и Волшебный ковер
- Serbian: Asteriks kod Šećerlemade (Šećerlemada is Orinjade's name in Serbian, itself being the word pun combining the name of Scheherazade from 1001 Nights and word šećerlema, meaning sweet candy)
- Spanish: Astérix en la India
- Swedish: Asterix i Indien
