= Asterix and the Chariot Race =

37th book in the Asterix series

Asterix and the Chariot Race (Astérix et la Transitalique)
- Series: Asterix

Creative team
- Writers: Jean-Yves Ferri
- Artists: Didier Conrad

Original publication
- Date of publication: 19 October 2017
- Language: French
- ISBN: 978-2-86497-327-0; 978-2-86497-328-7 (Version luxe)

Translation
- Publisher: Orion Children's Books
- Date: 2017
- ISBN: 978-1-5101-0401-3
- Translator: Adriana Hunter

Chronology
- Preceded by: Asterix and the Missing Scroll
- Followed by: Asterix and the Chieftain's Daughter

Asterix and the Chariot Race (French: Astérix et la Transitalique, "Asterix and the Trans-Italic") is the 37th book in the Asterix series, and the third to be written by Jean-Yves Ferri and illustrated by Didier Conrad. The book was released worldwide in more than 20 languages on 19 October 2017 with an initial print run of 5 million copies.

== Plot ==
Responding to criticism of the "deplorable" condition of Roman roads in the regions, Senator Lactus Bifidus proposes a chariot race across the Italic Peninsula to showcase the "excellent" roads. The race is open to all people of the known world. Julius Caesar endorses the race but insists that a Roman must win for the sake of unity across the Italic Peninsula. Otherwise, Bifidus will be banished and exiled to Cyrenaica (now eastern Libya).

In Gaul, Asterix and Obelix are taking Geriatrix to a dentist at a market in Darioritum, when a sibyl predicts Obelix will become a champion charioteer. Obelix then buys a sports chariot on credit, quits his menhir business and joins the trans-Italic race, accompanied by Asterix and Dogmatix. Over the course of the race, they encounter a range of competitors from other lands, as well as the people and cuisines of Ancient Italy. Their most important rival is the masked Coronavirus.

Only five teams manage to complete the race, with the two Gauls narrow victors over Julius Caesar, who had secretly joined the race as a replacement masked Coronavirus in an effort to save Rome's honor. Weary of the frantic pace of chariot racing, Obelix gives the trophy to Asterix, who hands it over to the Kushite team, who in turn give it to the Sarmatians. The trophy ends up with the perennially late Lusitanian team, who request the equivalent in sesterces. Obelix then declares he wants to return home and resume making menhirs.

=== Competitors ===
Team	Drivers	Chariot motif	Result	Additional information
Gauls	Obelix and Asterix	Gallic rooster	1st – Winners	Horses stolen from Romans in return for four menhirs.
Bretons	Madmax and Ecotax	Lions	Retired	Chariot sabotaged on leaving Parma.
Lusitanians	Bitovamess and Undaduress	Fish	5th	Although always late due to chariot maintenance, and despite finishing fifth, they end up with the trophy.
Kushites	Princesses Nefersaynefer and Kweenlatifer	Cheetah hieroglyph	2nd	Zebras pull their chariot. Kweenlatifer falls in love with Dogmatix.
Romans	Coronavirus and Bacillus; Julius Caesar	Aquila	Retired	The favorite, Coronavirus (real name Testus Terone), quits the race upon learning his co-driver cheated. Replaced by Julius Caesar, who almost wins but is immobilized by a pot-hole.
Pirates	Redbeard and Lookout	Jolly roger	Retired	They sink in marshes of Venexia.
Cimbri	Zerogluten and Betakaroten	Moose skull and antlers	Retired	Slaves of Bifidus, they sabotage many other chariots with the aim of ensuring victory for the Roman team. Eliminated when Obelix crushes their chariot.
Sarmatians	Tekaloadov and Wotaloadov	Bear	3rd	
Greeks	Yudabos and Attalos	Golden Fleece	4th	
Normans	Skinnidecaf and Gamefralaf	Shields	Retired	Quit the race because of homesickness due to good weather and civilization.
Persians	Unnamed	Bull	Retired	Eliminated due to sabotage.

There are several other teams, including a Belgian named Outinthastix and his compatriot, two competitors who resemble Hells Angels, two Goths in a wolf-motif chariot, as well as Helvetians, Ligurians, Etruscans, and Calabrians. There is even an Arab team with dromedaries and a Nordic team on a sled.

== Caricatures and references ==
- Some of the characters in the book are obvious caricatures of real-life people. The innkeeper in Parma resembles opera singer Luciano Pavarotti, while the famous Roman masked charioteer Coronavirus is modeled on racing driver Alain Prost, and the garum tycoon Lupus is modeled on former Italian prime minister Silvio Berlusconi. French media noted that Nefersaynefer and Kweenlatifer resemble Venus and Serena Williams. Reviewers also noted a waitress at the roadside inn in Tibur resembles Italian actress Sophia Loren.
- Coincidentally, the character named Coronavirus wore a mask, three years before widespread mask mandates during the COVID-19 pandemic.
- On page 24, the man sketching the race resembles Leonardo da Vinci. The statues and the mysterious beauty with the charming smile which Asterix and Obelix encounter in Florencia (Florence) are a nod to the city's later significance as the center and birthplace of the Italian Renaissance. The scenes in Sena Julia, where the racers are going in a circle searching for an inn, are a reference to the Palio di Siena and the Piazza del Campo.
- While passing Pompeii, Obelix temporarily forestalls a catastrophic eruption of Mount Vesuvius.

== Reception ==
Comics Review said the book is "furiously funny and hilariously jam-packed with timeless jibes and cracking contemporary swipes".

The book received renewed media attention in 2020 amid the COVID-19 pandemic because the charioteer favored to win the race goes by the name "coronavirus" and wears a face mask.

== Notes ==
- The English edition is the first Asterix album to be translated by Adriana Hunter, following the retirement of long-time translator Anthea Bell. At the end of the book, there is a message of thanks to Bell from the publishers for "her wonderful translation work on Asterix over the years".
- On page 24, Asterix and Obelix pass a group of Gaulish tourists with a "house-wagon". This type of conveyance previously appeared in Asterix in Spain (1969).
- On the race map, the city of Parma is marked with a leg of ham, which is in modern times one of its most famous exports.
- On page 40, a Helvetian friend of Asterix and Obelix from Asterix in Switzerland makes a cameo appearance.
- Beyond the Roman roadblock, Asterix and Obelix encounter "two indomitable Umbrians". The Umbri (as they were originally called) were conquered by Rome in 260 BC, and thus are an Italic counterpart of Asterix and his Gaulish companions.
- The Kushite princesses speaking only in hieroglyphs is probably a reference to the kingdom of Kush once belonging to the Egyptian empire.
