= List of Asterix volumes =

This is a list of all Asterix volumes, including the 41 official albums and various tie-ins.

All original French publishing dates and volume numbers are shown. Other translation publishing dates and volume numbering may differ.

== Comic Books ==
=== Goscinny and Uderzo (1961–1979, 2003, 2009) ===
#	Year	English Title	French Title	Main Setting	Plot
1	1961	Asterix the Gaul	Astérix le Gaulois	Asterix's village and Roman camp Compendium (no travel)	The Romans discover the secret of the Gauls' strength is the magic potion brewed by the druid Getafix, so they capture him and attempt to get the recipe out of him. It is up to Asterix and his wits to save Getafix.
2	1962	Asterix and the Golden Sickle	La Serpe d'or	Lutetia (Paris)	Getafix's sickle breaks, so Asterix and Obelix volunteer to go to Lutetia to buy a new one. But there is a mysterious sickle shortage our heroes must get to the bottom of.
3	1963	Asterix and the Goths	Astérix et les Goths	Germany	The druid Getafix is captured by a tribe of Goths, and Asterix and Obelix must rescue him.
4	1964	Asterix the Gladiator	Astérix gladiateur	Rome	Odius Asparagus, the prefect of Gaul, captures Cacofonix and sends him as a present to Caesar. Unimpressed by the bard, Caesar orders him to be thrown to the lions at the Circus Maximus. Asterix and Obelix hitchhike to Rome where they must become gladiators to rescue Cacofonix.
5	1965	Asterix and the Banquet	Le Tour de Gaule d'Astérix	Various French cities	Unsuccessful at conquering the village, the Romans decide to isolate it by building a stockade. To remove it, Asterix strikes a bet with the Romans that he and Obelix can travel throughout Gaul and back to the village with various Gaulish delicacies without the Romans being able to stop them. The route is a parallel to the modern Tour de France cycling event. In this adventure, Obelix gets his canine companion, Dogmatix.
6	1965	Asterix and Cleopatra	Astérix et Cléopâtre	Egypt	Caesar calls the Egyptians inferior to the Romans. Outraged, Cleopatra wagers that her people can build a grand monument in record time. Edifis, a bumbling, timid architect is asked to perform the miracle, and asks his old friend Getafix for help. Meanwhile, his rival and Caesar's agents attempt to sabotage the effort.
7	1966	Asterix and the Big Fight	Le combat des chefs	Asterix's village (no travel)	The Romans conspire with a Roman-friendly Gaulish village to declare a ritual winner-takes-all fight between village chiefs. A blow from one of Obelix's menhirs causes Getafix to lose his memory, leaving the Gauls without magic potion. The fight parodies professional boxing.
8	1966	Asterix in Britain	Astérix chez les Bretons	Britain	One small village in Britain still holds out against the Roman invaders. But with no magic potion, they need help, so Asterix's cousin Anticlimax comes to Gaul seeking aid.
9	1966	Asterix and the Normans	Astérix et les Normands	Asterix's village (no travel)	The Normans are fearless to the point of not even understanding the concept, so they travel to Gaul where they kidnap chief Vitalstatistix's cowardly visiting nephew Justforkix to teach them fear.
10	1967	Asterix the Legionary	Astérix légionnaire	North Africa	Asterix and Obelix join the Roman Legion (in a parody of the French Foreign Legion) in an attempt to find the conscripted fiancé of Panacea, a villager on whom Obelix has a big crush. With an eclectic group of foreigners, they are sent to North Africa to fight the traitor Scipio.
11	1968	Asterix and the Chieftain's Shield	Le bouclier Arverne	Cities in southern France: Acqua Calidae (Vichy), Gergovia, Nemessos (Clermont-Ferrand)	After too many banquets, chief Vitalstatistix is forced to visit a spa in the Arvernian countryside to nurse his sore liver. Meanwhile, Caesar orders his men to search the area for the shield of Vercingetorix, regarded as a patriotic symbol by the Gauls.
12	1968	Asterix at the Olympic Games	Astérix aux Jeux Olympiques	Greece	To participate in the Olympic Games in Greece, the Gauls register themselves as Romans. When the officials declare the magic potion to be a form of illegal doping, Asterix turns to his native abilities to compete.
13	1969	Asterix and the Cauldron	Astérix et le chaudron	Condatum (Rennes)	Whosemoralsarelastix, chief of a nearby village, asks Vitalstatistix to hide his village's money to prevent the Romans from taking it. When the money is stolen under his watch, Asterix is banished until he can repay the money and recover his honour.
14	1969	Asterix in Spain	Astérix en Hispanie	Spain	Pepe, the young and obstinate son of a Spanish chieftain, is kidnapped by the Romans and sent to Gaul. Asterix and Obelix rescue him and escort him back to Spain.
15	1970	Asterix and the Roman Agent	La Zizanie	Asterix's village (no travel)	A troublemaker is brought to Caesar in Rome; he was to be executed in the Circus Maximus, but is so conniving that the lions ate each other instead. Caesar sends him to the Gaulish village in an attempt to destroy unity.
16	1970	Asterix in Switzerland	Astérix chez les Helvètes	Switzerland	A poisoned Roman tax inspector is given sanctuary in the village. Asterix and Obelix are sent to Switzerland to recover edelweiss, which is needed to cure him.
17	1971	The Mansions of the Gods	Le Domaine des dieux	Asterix's village (no travel)	Caesar tries to dilute solidarity and weaken local customs in Gaul by creating a vacation resort near the village. The villagers sabotage the plan, first by magically replanting trees at the building site, and by creating a slaves' union; later by being obnoxious neighbors to the resident Romans.
18	1972	Asterix and the Laurel Wreath	Les Lauriers de César	Rome	Thoroughly chagrined by his obnoxious brother-in-law, Vitalstatistix gets drunk and boasts he will create a dish seasoned with Caesar's laurel wreath. He orders Asterix and Obelix travel to Rome to retrieve it.
19	1972	Asterix and the Soothsayer	Le Devin	Asterix's village (no travel)	In the absence of Getafix, a fraudulent seer seeks shelter in the Village during a storm. Camped in the forest, he makes predictions the villagers want to hear and asks them to provide items (food, alcohol and money) from which to "read" the future. He is later captured by the Romans and ordered to convince the Gauls to abandon their village. Only Asterix remains skeptical.
20	1973	Asterix in Corsica	Astérix en Corse	Corsica	As part of celebrations of the anniversary of Vercingetorix's victory at the Battle of Gergovia, the Gauls and their friends raid one of the nearby Roman camps. A stoic and composed prisoner is discovered, who reveals himself as Boneywasawarriorwayayix, a tribal leader from Corsica. Asterix and Obelix accompany him back to Corsica, to unite the quarrelling tribes against the Romans.
21	1974	Asterix and Caesar's Gift	Le Cadeau de César	Asterix's village	At the end of their career, legionaries are granted plots of land in Roman colonies for retirement. A perpetually inebriated soldier is given the Village, by Caesar's hand, which he promptly sells to an innkeeper for wine. The innkeeper sells his property and attempts to claim the village as his own. Upon discovering his ownership is void, he is pushed by his dominant wife to campaign to be elected chief, causing rivalries throughout the village. To complicate matter, the soldier arrives and asks the local legions' aid in reclaiming his village, since he didn't get enough wine for it.
22	1975	Asterix and the Great Crossing	La Grande traversée	North America and Denmark	Brewing the magic potion requires fresh fish, and Unhygienix has none since he imports them from Lutetia (Paris) (despite living by the sea). Asterix and Obelix set sail to catch fish, but become lost and end up on the other side of the ocean, discovering a New World, where they eventually become a legend to the Native American populace. Soon afterwards, a Viking explorer discovers America, and captures the first natives he finds (i.e. Asterix and Obelix) and brings them home. A running joke in this comic is that none of the races are able to understand one another, the Vikings speaking with Scandinavian vowels that the Gauls are unable to duplicate, but that their dogs are able to communicate perfectly.
23*	1976	Asterix Conquers Rome	Les 12 Travaux D'Asterix	various locations	To prove to his critics that the Gauls are mere mortals, Julius Caesar challenges the village to perform twelve tasks that only gods could perform, similar to the twelve tasks of Hercules. If they succeed, he will admit defeat and let them become the rulers of Rome, but if they fail, they will become his slaves. The challenge is accepted and Asterix and Obelix are chosen to represent the village, eventually succeeding in all tasks. (This comic book, published in 1976, is an adaptation of the animated film The Twelve Tasks of Asterix. The artwork is thought to be by Uderzo's brother Marcel. It has rarely been printed and usually excluded from the canonical list of Asterix volumes.)
23	1976	Obelix and Co.	Obélix et Compagnie	Asterix's village (no travel)	Caesar sends one of his advisors to the Gaulish village, in an effort to make them rich, decadent and utterly dependent on Rome. He starts by buying menhirs at ever-increasing prices, thus persuading most of the village to make useless menhirs, and in turn employing other villagers to hunt for their food. The plan goes awry when Caesar's treasury proves insufficient to fund the menhirs, and a campaign to sell them in Rome fails because of competition from Egyptian menhirs and slave-made Roman menhirs.
24	1979	Asterix in Belgium	Astérix chez les Belges	Belgium	When Vitalstatistix hears that Caesar has said the Belgians are the bravest of all the Gaulish peoples he heads to Belgium in a huff to show the world that his Armoricans are really the best.
32	2003	Asterix and the Class Act	Astérix et la rentrée gauloise	Most stories take place in Asterix's village	A collection of several short stories, including an experiment at different drawing and storytelling styles. Most stories are written by Goscinny.
34	2009	Asterix and Obelix's Birthday	L'Anniversaire d'Astérix et Obélix - le Livre d'Or		Several short stories, including some written by Goscinny.

=== Uderzo only (1980–2005) ===
After the death of Goscinny, Uderzo continued the series by himself, writing his own stories on subjects such as feminism and aliens, with travels to India and Atlantis.

#	Year	English Title	French Title	Setting	Plot
25	1980	Asterix and the Great Divide	Le Grand fossé	A fictional Gaulish village	Asterix and Obelix visit a village split in half by its rival chiefs. However, one chief's son and the other's daughter are in love, and together with Asterix and Obelix, they reunite the village. The dividing chasm is an allusion to the Berlin Wall, while the star-crossed lovers plot recalls Romeo and Juliet.
26	1981	Asterix and the Black Gold	L'Odyssée d'Astérix	The Middle East, Jerusalem	Getafix has run out of rock oil and sends Asterix and Obelix to Mesopotamia in search of it. They are accompanied by a Gaulish-Roman druid called Dubbelosix, who is really a double agent seeking to foul their mission. Includes a tribute to Goscinny, who was Jewish.
27	1983	Asterix and Son	Le Fils d'Astérix	Asterix's village (no travel)	A baby boy mysteriously turns up at Asterix's doorstep. No one in the village knows who he is, so Asterix is forced to be his adoptive father. Meanwhile, Roman legions led by Brutus are after the baby, who is actually Caesar's son, Caesarion.
28	1987	Asterix and the Magic Carpet	Astérix chez Rahazade	Iran, India	A fakir from far-away India travels to Asterix's village and asks Cacofonix to save his land from drought since his singing can cause rain. Cacofonix, accompanied by Asterix and Obelix, must travel to India aboard a magic carpet to save the life of the princess Orinjade, who is to be sacrificed to stop the drought.
29	1991	Asterix and the Secret Weapon	La Rose et le glaive	Asterix's village (no travel)	A feminist satire in which a female bard called Bravura replaces Cacofonix as school teacher and "liberates" the village women, causing the men to leave and live in the forest. Caesar secretly sends a battalion of female legionaries to conquer the village, having heard the Gauls will not strike a woman. The men and women have to settle their differences to overcome this threat.
30	1996	Asterix and Obelix All at Sea	La Galère d'Obélix	Atlantis	Left alone in Getafix's hut, Obelix drinks a cauldron of magic potion. He first turns to stone, then into a small boy. Meanwhile, a group of men have escaped from Roman slavery on board a ship. Together, they travel to Atlantis, hoping to make Obelix a grown man again.
31	2001	Asterix and the Actress	Astérix et Latraviata	Asterix's village (no travel)	A Roman actress poses as Panacea in order to steal back a fancy sword/scabbard and helmet belonging to Pompey, which Asterix and Obelix received for their shared birthday.
33	2005	Asterix and the Falling Sky	Le ciel lui tombe sur la tête	Asterix's village (no travel)	Rival aliens visit the Gaulish village in search of the Gaul's great weapon, which is "known throughout the universe". The aliens battle each other, and the magic potion later proves to have an unexpected side-effect on them.

=== Jean-Yves Ferri and Didier Conrad (2013–2021) ===
The series is no longer written by Albert Uderzo, but rather by Jean-Yves Ferri and illustrated by Didier Conrad – the first time the story creation has been shared between two people since Goscinny's death in 1977.

#	Year	English Title	French Title	Setting	Plot
35	2013	Asterix and the Picts	Astérix chez les Pictes	Caledonia	When Asterix and Obelix rescue a mysterious Pict named MacAroon, they must journey to Caledonia, to return him to his lady love, Camomilla, the adopted daughter of the old king. However, the treacherous chieftain MacCabeus – with the help of the Romans – plans to marry her and claim the throne.
36	2015	Asterix and the Missing Scroll	Le Papyrus de César	Asterix's village (no travel)	Julius Caesar has written a history of his campaigns in Gaul. His publisher, Libellus Blockbustus, advises him to cut a chapter detailing his defeats by the indomitable Gauls. A stolen copy of the censored chapter ends up with the Gauls, who take measures to ensure it will be remembered for future generations.
37	2017	Asterix and the Chariot Race	Astérix et la Transitalique	Italy	Obelix decides to join a chariot race across the homeland of the Romans, Italy, accompanied by Asterix and Dogmatix. The race takes them to Venexia, Florencia, Neapolis, Sena Julia and other locations.
38	2019	Asterix and the Chieftain's Daughter	La Fille De Vercingétorix	Asterix's Village (no travel)	Escorted by two Arvernes chiefs, a mysterious teenager has just arrived at the village. Caesar and his legionaries seek her, and for good reason. In the village, it is rumored that the father of the visitor is no other than the great Vercingétorix himself.
39	2021	Asterix and the Griffin	Asterix et le Griffon	±Barbarikon	When Julius Caesar launches an expedition to capture a griffin, Sarmatian shaman Fanciacuppov, to whom griffins are holy, asks Getafix for help. The Gaulish druid brings Asterix and Obelix, who team up with a band of female warriors to fight the Romans. Meanwhile, Dogmatix befriends a pack of wolves.

=== Fabcaro and Didier Conrad (2023–present) ===
Fabcaro replaces Jean-Yves Ferri as the writer of the series with Didier Conrad continuing to draw the comics.

#	Year	English Title	French Title	Setting	Plot
40	2023	Asterix and the White Iris	L'Iris blanc	Asterix's village, Lutetia	The morale among the Roman legions is low and the legionnaires are on the brink of mutiny. Chief medical officer Isivertuus has a plan to boost the morale using his "White Iris" doctrine. Isivertuus manages to almost completely placate the Gaulish village and seduces Impedimenta to travel to Lutetia with him, where he plans to give her to Caesar as a gift. Isivertuus's plan backfires when Vitalstatistix, longing after his wife, travels to Lutetia with Asterix and Obelix to rescue her.
41	2025	Asterix in Lusitania	Astérix en Lusitanie	Portugal	Asterix and Obelix visit Lusitania to thwart a corrupt governor's plot to frame a Lusitanian garum seller as the culprit of an assassination attempt on Julius Caesar and thus become a trusted advisor of Caesar, and ultimately to overthrow Caesar himself.

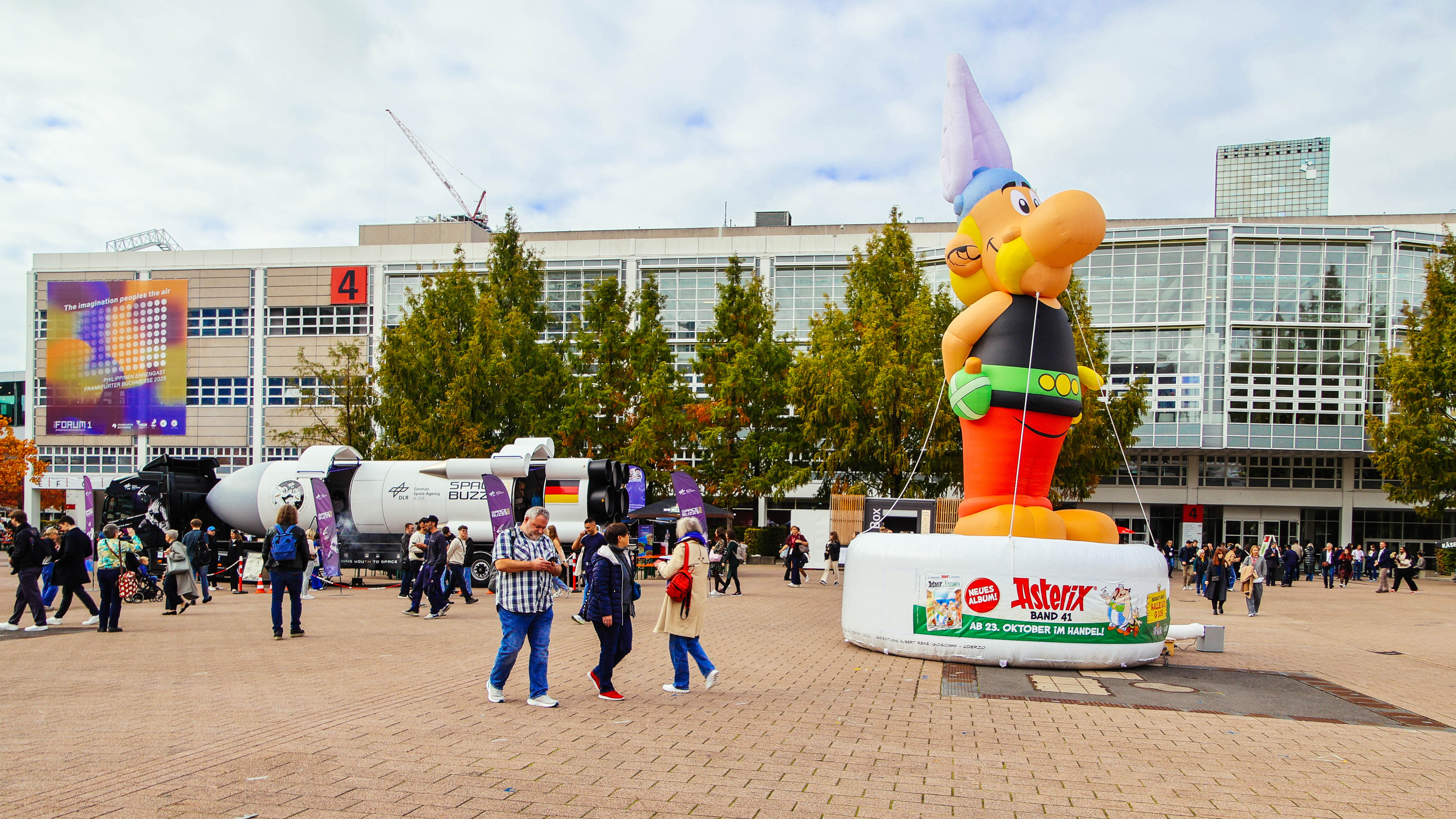
Promotion for Volume 41 at the Frankfurt Book Fair (2025)

=== Format ===
The storyline in a volume is typically 44 pages long; the exceptions are Asterix and the Golden Sickle, which is 42 pages, Asterix and the Goths, which is 43 pages, Asterix Conquers Rome, which is 28 pages, Asterix and the Chariot Race, which is 45 pages; and Asterix and the Class Act and Asterix and Obelix's Birthday: The Golden Book, both of which are collections of short stories.

== Text stories ==
In 1967, Goscinny and Uderzo produced a narrated adventure Le menhir d'or (The Golden Menhir) on vinyl, accompanied by an illustrated storybook to be read along with the record. The book was reprinted with a new recording accessible by download in 2020.

In the mid-1980s a series of illustrated text stories appeared, with some original art, but mostly taken and modified from existing albums. These were 26 pages in a smaller format than the normal albums with large print. They are aimed at a younger audience and were not enthusiastically received; translation into other languages was spotty. Unofficial fan translations to English of a few of these titles exist.

1. 1984 – Les Pirates (The Pirates)
2. 1985 – L'illustrissime Belcantus (The Illustrious Belacantus)
3. 1985 – L'abominable horrifix (The Dreadful Horrifix)
4. 1985 – Jericocorix (The Jericocorix)
5. 1986 – La course de chars (The Great Chariot Race)
6. 1986 – Le feu de pommes (The Apple Cider)
7. 1986 – Marmaille et pagaille (Kids and Chaos)
8. 1986 – L'eau du ciel (Water from Heaven)

In 1989 a final illustrated story appeared. The story was by Goscinny (in 1965) with new, original art by Uderzo. It was 32 pages and appeared in the larger format used for the regular albums. It was the only one that was published in English:

- 1989 – Comment Obelix est tombé dans la marmite du druide quand il était petit (How Obelix Fell into the Magic Potion When he was a Little Boy)

Also in 1989–90 the first eight illustrated stories were reprinted in some locales as four books, each containing two of the original stories.

- 1999 – Le livre d' Asterix le Gaulois

In 2007, Editions Albert René published Astérix et ses Amis (Asterix and friends), a collection of short Asterix stories written and drawn by, and in the distinctive styles of, a number of cartoonists other than Uderzo. The book was dedicated to Uderzo on the occasion of his 80th birthday and carries a foreword by Sylvie, his daughter.

== Film adaptations ==
Asterix films not based closely on a single book have had film books released in a format similar to the original albums, but with scenes from the films and a written story.

1. 1976 – The Twelve Tasks of Asterix (Les douze travaux d'Astérix); twelve short illustrated books, each covering one of the tasks, were also published.
2. 1985 – Asterix Versus Caesar (Astérix et la surprise de César)
3. 1989 – Operation Getafix, based on the film Asterix and the Big Fight (Astérix et le coup du menhir)
4. 1994 – Asterix Conquers America (Astérix et les indiens)
5. 2006 – Asterix and the Vikings (Astérix et les Vikings)
6. 2018 - Le Secret de la Potion Magique - text by Olivier Gay and illustrations by Fabrice Tarrin (Asterix: The Secret of the Magic Potion, this book had not been published in English)
7. 2023 - L'empire du milieu - text by Olivier Gay and illustrations by Fabrice Tarrin (Asterix & Obelix: The Middle Kingdom, this book had not been published in English)
