= Asterix and the White Iris =

2023 comic book

Asterix and the White Iris (L'Iris blanc)
- Series: Asterix

Creative team
- Writers: Fabcaro
- Artists: Didier Conrad

Original publication
- Date of publication: October 26, 2023
- Language: French

Chronology
- Preceded by: Asterix and the Griffin
- Followed by: Asterix in Lusitania

Asterix and the White Iris (French: L'Iris blanc) is the 40th book in the Asterix series, the first to be written by Fabcaro, and the sixth to be illustrated by Didier Conrad. It was published on October 26, 2023.

On release, Rich Johnston writing for the Bleeding Cool news and review website, stated that it "is my favourite Asterix book since original writer and co-creator Rene Goscinny died."

== Plot ==
Recently, Julius Caesar has been faced with mass insubordination and desertions in the Roman army. His chief medical officer Isivertuus has long formulated a plan, which he calls "White Iris", to improve the army's overall morale and health with psychological persuasion, and is therefore put in charge of a legion in Armorica for a test run. In turn, Caesar demands proof that his method works by challenging him to conquer the Gaulish village.

Isivertuus settles in Camp Totorum and pays regular visits to the Gaulish village, where he begins to endear himself to the locals using poetry and psychological finesse in order to undermine their will to resistance. The villagers begin adopting his advice, which leads to village life becoming uncharacteristically placid and the Romans and even the boars losing their natural fear of the Gauls. Worried, Asterix, Getafix and Vitalstatistix expel Isivertuus from the village, but the sage successfully seduces Impedimenta into accompanying him to Lutetia so Caesar can use her as leverage to force the Gauls' surrender. Asterix, Obelix and a very depressed Vitalstatistix rush after them.

The three Gauls follow Impedimenta and Isivertuus' trail to a theater in Lutetia, where Isivertuus has arranged his meeting with Caesar. Asterix, Obelix and Vitalstatistix burst onto the stage in mid-performance, triggering a fight with the Roman guards and a happy reunion between the chief and his wife. Amidst the disorder, Caesar arrives and sentences Isivertuus to death in the arena for his failure, but Asterix successfully pleads for clemency, and Isivertuus is instead sent to a temporary stint as a galley slave. Asterix and his friends return to their home, where everything has returned to normal without Isivertuus' continued influence.

== Commentary ==
- The character Isivertuus resembles the French intellectual Bernard-Henri Lévy. However, Fabcaro commented that the character was inspired by the Brazilian author Paulo Coelho, who is frequently ridiculed for his "kitschy mysticism".
- This album includes the first appearance of Impedimenta's wealthy brother Homeopathix and his wife Tapioca since Asterix and the Laurel Wreath.
- In this album, Lutetia is shown adapting several types of modern-day transportation. The West Armorica Great Northern (WAGN, which shares the same acronym as the British West Anglia Great Northern) chariot service refers to the now-rebranded TGV intercity train service, and a primitive version of the kick scooter is also introduced.
- A museum visited by Isivertuus and Impedimenta features parodies of famous works by Banksy, Christian Boltanski, Andy Warhol and Kazimir Malevich.
