= Asterix and the Roman Agent =

Comic book album

Asterix and the Roman Agent (La Zizanie)
- Date: 1972
- Series: Asterix

Creative team
- Writers: Rene Goscinny
- Artists: Albert Uderzo

Original publication
- Date of publication: 1970
- Language: French

Chronology
- Preceded by: Asterix in Spain
- Followed by: Asterix in Switzerland

Asterix and the Roman Agent (French: La Zizanie, "Discord") is the fifteenth volume of the Asterix comic book series, by René Goscinny (stories) and Albert Uderzo (illustrations). It first appeared as a serial in Pilote magazine issues 531–552 in 1970 and was translated into English in 1972.

== Plot summary ==
The resistance of the Gaulish village against the Romans causes friction between dictator Julius Caesar and the Roman Senate, whose power had been reduced by Julius Caesar. With their Magic Potion which gives them superhuman strength and is known only to their druid Getafix, they easily stand up against Rome and her laws.

At a meeting with his associates, it is suggested to Caesar that causing internal conflict between the Gauls will lead to their breakdown. He is then told by another Official about Tortuous Convolvulus, a natural troublemaker whose mere presence causes arguments, quarrels and fights. This had him sentenced to the lions in the circus, but his ability had the lions eat each other and he is still in prison. Impressed by his abilities, Caesar sends him to the Gauls. On the way, Convolvulus has the whole ship arguing, from the captain to the galley slaves; and when the pirates attack the ship, Convolvulus represents one of them as having been bribed earlier by himself, and thus provokes them to sink their own ship. The pirate chief realises their mistake, and comments that they don't even need the Gauls to make fools of themselves.

In the Gaulish village, things are being organised for Chief Vitalstatistix's birthday, whom all enjoy except Impedimenta, who complains against the acquisition of useless presents including a mounting collection of swords, shields, stuffed fish, and menhirs. Arriving in Gaul, Convolvulus moves into the nearby Roman camp of Aquarium and gets a description of the village inhabitants. He then gives a valuable vase to Asterix whom he describes as the "most important man in the village", to the annoyance of Chief Vitalstatistix. The other villagers take this announcement seriously until Impedimenta fights with the village's other women over their husbands' relative importances, and then privately dismisses her husband as a failure. Further rumors lead to the belief by many in the village that Asterix, who is close to Getafix the druid, has revealed the secret of the druid's Magic Potion to the Romans. Suspicion and paranoia increase, until the banquet to celebrate the Chief's birthday is held in sullen silence.

Leading this distrust are Fulliautomatix the blacksmith, Geriatrix the elder, and their wives. When Fullautomatix and Unhygienix spy on the Romans, they see a mock 'potion' being given to Roman soldiers. when their presence is noted, Convolvulus has a small legionary pretend to knock out his huge comrade Magnumopus, causing the two Gauls to flee back to the village. As a result, the Roman troops of Aquarium believe that they have the Magic Potion and insist on drinking the substitute. The real turning point in this ruse occurs when some of the deceived villagers voice their suspicions that Asterix and Getafix gave the secret of the Magic Potion to the Romans (which the latter takes offence to as his ancient secrets are only to be passed down to other Druids), thus giving Asterix and Getafix an excuse to announce a self-imposed exile, with Obelix accompanying them, wherein their purpose is to expose Convolvulus and teach the other Gauls a lesson in trust. Asterix and Getafix then confront Convolvulus and announce that they and Obelix shall leave the region (thus leaving the other Gauls defenseless). Taking them at their word, Convolvulus persuades the Roman commander, Centurion Platypus, to attack the village. The Gauls meanwhile take the Romans' fake potion back to the village, where it is proven useless and the ruse proven false. Convolvulus sees this and informs Platypus, who calls for an immediate attack, but Getafix makes some genuine Magic Potion. Platypus summons reinforcements after Asterix and Obelix repel his garrison.

After drinking the real Magic Potion, the Gaulish villagers defeat all four of the Roman garrisons that surround them. After winning the fight, Asterix, Getafix and Vitalstatistix thank Convolvulus for having "kept his word" and give him the vase he gave Asterix earlier. This tricks the Roman commander into believing that Convolvulus deliberately engineered their defeat. Convolvulus is sent back to Rome for punishment, but there is a strong hint that his peculiar talent will help him escape his sentence since he is already causing arguments on the ship taking him back.

In the village, Vitalstatistix apologizes to Asterix, and it is agreed to hold another birthday for Vitalstatistix himself. To test the villagers' conviction and make sure the previous incident will never happen again, Asterix arranges that Obelix carry him on a shield, after the fashion customary to Vitalstatistix, and thus causes another quarrel among the villagers over which of the men is the most heroic. When questioned by Vitalstatistix, Asterix claims to have merely been "test[ing]" the shield intended as the chief's birthday present. With all reconciled, the story ends with the traditional banquet, which doubles for a better celebration of Vitalstatistix's birthday.

== In other languages ==
- Brazilian Portuguese: A Cizânia
- Catalan: La zitzània
- Croatian: Zavadi pa vladaj (Divide and Rule)
- Czech: Nesvár
- Danish: Lus i Skindpelsen (Louse in the Fur Coat)
- Dutch: De intrigant
- Finnish: Asterix ja riidankylväjä (Asterix and the Sower of Arguments)
- German: Streit um Asterix (The Asterix Controversy)
- Greek: Η διχόνοια
- Hebrew: הסכסכן מרומא
- Hindi: एस्ट्रिक्स और रोमन घुसपैठिया (Estriks aur Roman ghuspaithiyaa)
- Indonesian: Sang Penghasut
- Irish: Asterix agus an Cealgaire
- Italian: Asterix e la zizzania
- Latin: Tumultus de Asterige
- Norwegian: Brann i rosenes leir (Fire in the Rosy Camp)
- Polish: Niezgoda
- Pontic Greek: Το Ζιζάνιον
- Portuguese: A Zaragata
- Spanish: La cizaña
- Serbian: Завади па владај / Zavadi pa vladaj (Divide and Rule)
- Swedish: Asterix och tvedräkten
- Turkish: Asteriks Fitneci

== Reception ==
It was described by the screenwriter Russell T Davies as "the finest book ever made".
