= Asterix and Son =

27th volume of the Asterix comic book series

Asterix and Son (Le Fils d'Astérix)
- Date: 1983
- Series: Asterix

Creative team
- Writers: Albert Uderzo
- Artists: Albert Uderzo

Original publication
- Date of publication: 1983
- Language: French

Chronology
- Preceded by: Asterix and the Black Gold
- Followed by: Asterix and the Magic Carpet

Asterix and Son (French: Le Fils d'Astérix, "Asterix's Son") is the twenty-seventh volume of the Asterix comic book series, created by author René Goscinny and illustrator Albert Uderzo. It was the third Asterix album to be written and illustrated by Uderzo.

== Plot summary ==
A baby boy mysteriously appears on Asterix's doorstep one sunny morning. Stung by speculation that he could be the father, Asterix sets out with Obelix to find the baby's parents. Their only clue is the embroidered linen of the baby's clothes and wrappings, suggesting he comes from a rich Roman family. The Romans attempt to kidnap the baby, at the behest of Marcus Junius Brutus, Caesar's adopted son. Getafix realizes that the baby was left in the village for its protection.

While in the village, the baby twice drinks the magic potion, first by accident when Obelix uses a half-full potion gourd as a feeding bottle; later, he falls into a nearly-empty cauldron of potion. The baby smashes the doors of several houses and harms the Roman spies sent to capture him, including a legionary disguised as a rattle peddler, and the Prefect of Gaul, Crismus Cactus, who is disguised as a nursemaid. Finally, Brutus takes matters into his own hands, attacking the village with his own legions and burning it to the ground. The men of the village entrust the baby to the women, before fighting the Romans. Brutus seizes the baby from the women and escapes with the help of the pirates, but soon Asterix and Obelix catch up with him and rescue the baby.

The unexpected arrival of Caesar and then Cleopatra resolves the mystery. The baby is their son, Caesarion. Brutus had sought to kill the baby in order to become sole heir to Caesar's property and fortune, so Cleopatra had the boy sent to the Gaulish village for his protection. Caesar exiles Brutus to Upper Germania and promises to rebuild the village. The story ends with a banquet on Cleopatra's royal barge.

== Trivia ==
- Uderzo said he received a lot of criticism for not setting the final banquet in the village.
- This is the only time the Romans successfully attack and destroy the village, although Caesar promises to have it rebuilt.
- Like Asterix in Switzerland, this album presents a rare dark tone as it touches on the possibility of an innocent's murder. The destruction of the village, Impedimenta's tearful failure at protecting the child, and the apparent Roman victory over the Gauls add to this tone.
- In the English translation, before Caesar sends Brutus to Upper Germania, he says Et tu, Brute?, which were the words he spoke before his death in Shakespeare's Julius Caesar.

== In other languages ==
- French: Le fils d'Astérix
- Catalan: El fill d'Astèrix
- Croatian: Asterixov sin
- Czech: Asterixův syn
- Dutch: De zoon van Asterix
- Finnish: Asterixin poika, also translated to Rauma dialect as Asteriksim boikkane mukul ("Asterix's boy tot")
- Galician: O fillo de Astérix
- German: Der Sohn des Asterix
- Greek: Ο γιος του Αστερίξ
- Indonesian: Bayi Asterix
- Irish: Asterix agus a Mhac
- Italian: Il figlio di Asterix
- Latin Filius Asterigis
- Norwegian: Asterix & sønn
- Portuguese: O filho de Astérix
- Polish: Syn Asteriksa
- Russian: Сын Астерикса
- Serbian: Asteriksov sin
- Spanish: El hijo de Astérix
- Swedish: Asterix & Son
- Turkish: Asteriks'in Oğlu
- Welsh: Asterix a'r Pwt Bach Twt
