= Les Innommables =

Franco-Belgian comics by Yann le Pennetier

- Cover of Aventure en jaune, showing (from left to right): Tony, Alix, Mac and Tim.
- Story: Yann le Pennetier
- Ink: Didier Conrad
- Date: 1980–2004

Les Innommables ("The Unnameables") is a Franco-Belgian comic series written by Yann le Pennetier and drawn by Didier Conrad. It began publication in serialized form in 1980 in Spirou magazine and was eventually published in album form by Dargaud.

The series recounts the adventures of three U.S. Army deserters – Mac, Tony and Tim – in 1949, as they trek across Asia and search for Alix, who is Mac's lover and a Chinese communist spy. Les Innommables is characterized by its black humor as well as frequent displays of nudity and violence – which eventually ended the series' run in Spirou.

The first edition of the album Alix-Noni-Tengu contained two alternative endings. In re-editions, only the second ending was retained. The character of Alix was made the subject of a seven-volume spin-off series, Tigresse blanche ("White Tigress"), set before the events of Les Innommables.

Les Innommables has been translated into German (Helden ohne Skrupel) and Dutch (De onnoembaren). The album Pas-de-mâchoire was nominated for the 2001 Angoulême International Comics Festival Prize for Scenario.

== Albums ==
The initial volumes Aventure en jaune and Shukumeï were published in 1983 by Temps Futurs and in 1987 by Bédéscope, respectively. The entire series was published by Dargaud from 1996 to 2004:

1. Shukumeï, 2002
  Le Cycle du Hong Kong ("The Hong Kong Cycle")
2. Aventure en jaune ("Adventure in Yellow", 1996)
3. Le Crâne du Père Zé ("Father Zé's Skull", 1994)
  Le Cycle du Lotus Pourpre ("The Purple Lotus Cycle")
4. Ching Soao, 1995
5. Au Lotus Pourpre ("At the Purple Lotus, 1995)
6. Alix-Noni-Tengu, 1996
  Le Cycle de Corée ("The Korea Cycle")
7. Cloaques, 1997
8. Poupée de bronze ("The Bronze Doll", 1998)
9. Pas-de-Mâchoire, 2000
  Le Cycle U.S.A. ("The U.S.A. Cycle")
10. À l'est de Roswell ("East of Roswell", 2002)
11. Au nord de White Sands ("North of White Sands", 2003)
12. Au sud-ouest de Moscou, ("South-east of Moscow, 2004)

A black-and-white magazine supplement, Matricule triple zéro (1996), takes place prior to the events of the albums, and recounts the desertion of the three protagonists.
