= Asterix and the Falling Sky =

2005 French comic book

Asterix and the Falling Sky (Le ciel lui tombe sur la tête)
- Date: 2005
- Series: Asterix

Creative team
- Writers: Albert Uderzo
- Penciller: Albert Uderzo
- Inker: Frederic Mebarki
- Letterer: Michel Janvier
- Colorist: Thierry Mebarki

Original publication
- Date of publication: September 2005
- Language: French

Chronology
- Preceded by: Asterix and the Class Act
- Followed by: Asterix and Obelix's Birthday: The Golden Book

Asterix and the Falling Sky (French: Le ciel lui tombe sur la tête, "The Sky Falls On His Head") is the thirty-third volume of the Asterix comic book series, the ninth solely written and illustrated by Albert Uderzo and the only volume to introduce science fiction elements into the otherwise historical comedy series. The book was intended as a tribute to Walt Disney and a satire on the state of the French comics industry. It was released on October 14, 2005 to commercial success, but was panned by the critics.

== Plot summary ==
An alien spaceship appears above the Gaulish village, causing nearly all of the people and animals to turn rigid. Only Asterix, Obelix, Getafix and Dogmatix are unaffected due to consumption of the magic potion. An alien named Toon emerges from the spherical spaceship. He is from the planet Tadsilweny and is accompanied by "superclone" security men. Toon turns off his ship's "anti-collision magnetic field", ending the paralysis of the village. He informs the Gauls he is on a mission to confiscate their "secret weapon" (Getafix's potion) that is "known throughout the universe", in order to prevent it from being seized by evil aliens called Nagmas.

Meanwhile, a Nagma has landed his spaceship in the nearby Roman camp of Compendium and seeks the "powerful deadly weapon". The Roman centurion Polyanthus gives him directions to the Gaulish village. Toon's army of superclones and the Nagma's "cyberat" robot warriors engage in battle. Asterix and Obelix enter the fray, and the Nagma attempts to abduct Getafix. The Nagma is eventually defeated, and Toon abandons his quest for the magic potion as its only discernible effect on the aliens is to cause them to temporarily increase to an enormous size. As he departs, Toon erases all memory of his visit from the village and the Roman camp.

== Reception ==
Falling Sky was a commercial success, but a critical disappointment. Ian Rankin, writing for The Guardian, described this Asterix volume as appearing to 'jump the shark' and 'not a success' which possibly prompted the subsequent eight-year hiatus during which author Uderzo handed over writing duties to a new team. St Mag called it a 'disappointment' with 'more dissatisfactions in the book than anything else'. Roy Boyd from Sling's and Arrows called it a 'confused and pointless tale'. Splinter describes it as 'polarising', and 'the strangest Asterix story' that most deviates from the classic feel of the series, whilst acknowledging the influences that led Uderzo into introducing such foreign elements into the comic. There were some favourable reviews, including from Wales Online who acknowledged that 'purists will probably be horrified', but states that the story contains all the classic elements of an Asterix adventure.

== Commentary ==
- The cover is a mirror image of that for the first Asterix adventure, Asterix the Gaul.
- The book is dedicated to Uderzo's older brother Bruno (1920–2004), who first recognized and encouraged his younger brother's talent for art.
- At the end of the book, there is a message from Uderzo, paying tribute to "the great creations" of Walt Disney.
- The story is seen as a satire of the 2003 United States-led invasion of Iraq on the pretext of possession of weapons of mass destruction. The extraterrestrial elements have been described as a parody of American cultural imperialism.
- Toon resembles Mickey Mouse. The name of his planet, Tadsilweny, is an anagram of Walt Disney, while Hubs is an anagram of Bush (viewed as a reference to then US President George W. Bush). Uderzo told France-Soir newspaper he was inspired by "what the Americans are going through today with Bush".
- Toon's "superclones" resemble Arnold Schwarzenegger dressed as Superman, while the Nagma resembles an insect-like Japanese manga character, very possibly inspired by Kamen Rider. Uderzo said he disliked manga comics and his aim was to poke fun at them, while paying tribute to Walt Disney.
- Nagma is an anagram of manga while the Nagma sage's name Akoaotaki is an anagram of Takao Aoki, the creator of the Beyblade manga series.
- Uderzo was adamant this would not be the final Asterix album, saying in a Financial Times interview, "No, no, no, it is not the last. Certain journalists believed this because the cover was the mirror image of the first Asterix album. That is indeed the case but it was not at all my intention to suggest it would be the last album."
- Although criticized for its science fiction elements, the book was a commercial success, breaking comic book sales records in 2005 when 2.4 million copies of the French-language version were sold in two months.

== Awards ==
- 2006 Eagle Award for Best European Comic
