= Chemical Cut =

2016 American film

Chemical Cut is an American independent film written and directed by Marjorie Conrad.

== Release ==
Chemical Cut premiered in the Narrative Feature Competition lineup at the 2016 Slamdance Film Festival, subsequently winning the Female Eye Filmmaking Award at the New Hope Film Festival and screening at the Buffalo International Film Festival. The film was presented by Slamdance Cinema Club and ArcLight Cinemas as part of the ArcLight Presents screening series in Hollywood and Chicago in May 2016.
