= Didier Conrad =

French comics artist and writer

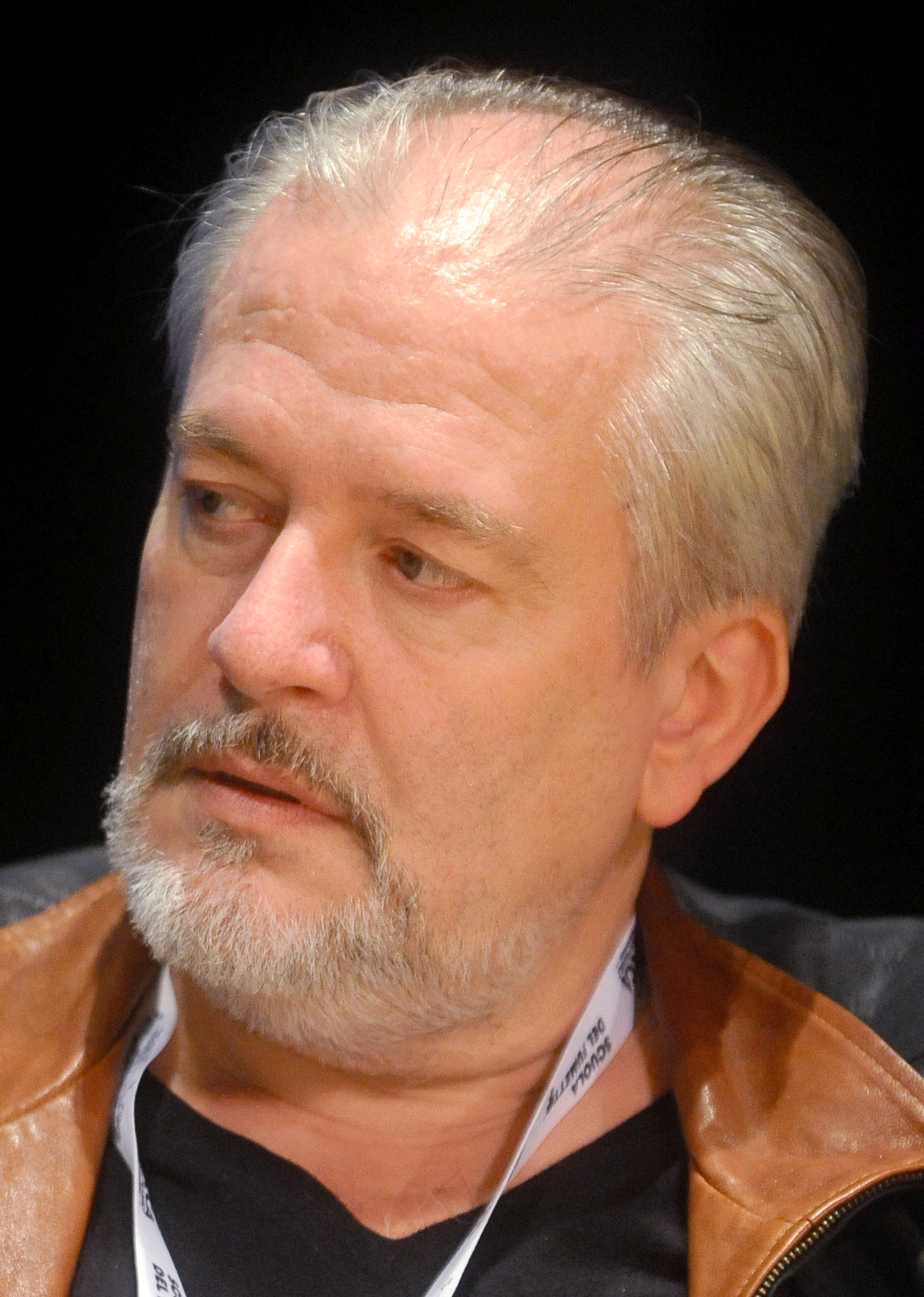
- Didier Conrad at Lucca Comics & Games 2015
- Born: 6 May 1959 (age 67); Marseille, France
- Website: Didier Conrad on Weebly

Didier Conrad (born 6 May 1969) is a French comics artist and writer. Since 2012, he has been the artist of the popular Asterix series.

== Biography ==
=== Beginnings ===
Didier Conrad was born in Marseille of parents originally from Switzerland. He developed a passion for comics and, at age 14, he sent a page to Journal de Spirou that was published in a page reserved for new talents. Five years later, in 1978, Conrad published his first comics series in the magazine: "Jason", written by Mythic. Spirou editor Thierry Martens put him in touch with another aspiring comics author also from Marseille: Yann Le Pennetier. The pair hit it off despite having quite different personalities and decided to work together.

=== Spirou years ===
After publishing a few short comics in Spirou together in which they collaborated on both the writing and art, Yann & Conrad were tasked by the new editor Alain de Kuyssche with adding doodles and jokes in the top margin of the magazine's pages. This was generally considered a chore by the magazine's contributors, but Yann & Conrad shook things up by spoofing and sometimes outright insulting the series straight below their work. This caused a controversy at the magazine, during which they were defended by the magazine's veteran artist André Franquin, who felt they were regenerating a now stale publication. The pair was next asked to devise an action series in the style of another Spirou star character, Buck Danny, then on a hiatus. They appeared to comply, teasing a new series to be called "Chuck Willys", apparently starring a square-jawed all-American war hero. This character however was run over by a Jeep in the second panel, never to be seen again, and the series retitled Les Innommables (the Unnamables). Les Innommables was originally written by Conrad, who was busy drawing "Jason", and drawn by Yann, but recognising their respective strengths, they eventually switched tasks. The series broke every possible taboo in a comics magazine aimed at children, featuring violence, sex and cruelty, and the pair were eventually sacked in 1982. During their period at Spirou, Conrad and Yann both still lived in Marseille and would spend the odd week in Brussels, staying in a guest room in the magazine's building. They later boasted that they would frequently break into the offices at night and read all the internal correspondence about themselves.

=== After Spirou ===
Yann and Conrad went in search of a new magazine to publish their work and ended up at Circus, a publication recently launched by publisher Glénat. Turning down a request to do more "top margin" works, they instead resurrected a series started earlier at Spirou and called "Bob Marone", a spoof of the best-selling pulp novel and comics series "Bob Morane" by Henri Vernes. Two albums telling a single time-travelling story about a hunt for a white dinosaur were published, but Yann and Conrad fell out before the end and Conrad finished the second story with his girlfriend Sophie Commenge (using the pen name "Lucie") as writer.

=== Without Yann ===
After parting with Yann, Conrad reduced his output and began working with Sophie Commenge, now using her real name, on a new character called Ernest Poildu, One album only came out, though a second story was partly published in a quarterly magazine. Conrad published no new album in the second half of the 1980s.

=== The return of Conrad ===
In 1990, Conrad returned to Dupuis, the publishing house behind Spirou magazine, which had somewhat modernised since the early 1980s and had launched a new album collection called "Aire Libre" giving authors some editorial freedom. Conrad reused his character Ernest Poildu in a new two-part story called "Le Piège Malais" ("The Malay Trap") and published a limited run album called "Tatum: La Machine Écarlate". He then produced a new series titled "Donito", the adventures of a little boy who talks to animals which is set in the Caribbean. For this series, Conrad finally turned his back on the provocations of his previous works and drew more inspiration from Walt Disney.

=== The return of Les Innommables ===
In 1994, Conrad reunited with Yann to resurrect their now cult series Les Innommables, which had ended abruptly when they were sacked by Spirou. The existing albums were remade and more episodes produced, turning the series into a more coherent saga with several successive story arcs, set respectively in Hong Kong, Korea and the US. The order of the albums was modified several times to fit the original one-shot stories within the saga.

=== Reunion with Yann ===
At the same time as Les Innommables returned, a spin-off series of the very popular Lucky Luke character by Morris appeared, titled Kid Lucky and purporting to show the character as a child, a popular trope in 1990s comics. This was credited to writer Jean Léturgie and artist Pearce, whose style resembled that of Conrad remarkably. When Morris and his publisher scrapped the series after two albums, it emerged that Pearce was actually Yann & Conrad sharing both writing and drawing duties as they had done at the beginning of their collaboration. The pair had decided to use a pen name for a series aimed at children to differentiate it from the rest of their joint output. Jean Léturgie and "Pearce" then launched a series in the same style called Cotton Kid and published five albums between 1999 and 2002.

In 1996, Conrad was hired by DreamWorks Animation to work on the film The Road to El Dorado. He moved to the United States to do so, but continued to work on comics as well, working simultaneously on Les Innommables, Kid Lucky then Cotton Kid, and more Bob Marone stories for Fluide Glacial magazine. Bob Marone was now written by Yann & Conrad and drawn by another artist, Yoann using the pen name Janus. Yann & Conrad also created a new spin-off series of Les Innommables titled Tigresse Blanche ("White Tiger") and focusing on the character of Alix Yin Fu, a female shaolin fighter and CCP trainee spy. This prequel series is set several years before Les Innommables, at the time of the Chinese Civil War. Conrad drew seven Tigresse Blanche albums in total, the first two written with Yann and another five with Sophie Commenge, now using the pen name Wilbur.

=== Asterix ===
In 2012, Albert Uderzo chose Conrad and writer Jean-Yves Ferri to take over the best-selling series Asterix, which Uderzo had created with René Goscinny in 1959 and continued on his own since the latter's death in 1977. Conrad and Ferri released the 35th Asterix adventure, Asterix and the Picts, in October 2013, and the 36th, Asterix and the Missing Scroll in October 2015. The 37th album, Asterix and the Chariot Race, was released on 19 October 2017; the 38th, Asterix and the Chieftain's Daughter, in 2019; and the 39th – their fifth – Asterix and the Griffin, in 2021.

For the 2023 release of the 40th Asterix album, Asterix and the White Iris, Conrad worked with a new scriptwriter, Fabcaro.
