= Fabcaro =

French cartoonist, writer and musician

Fabrice Caro
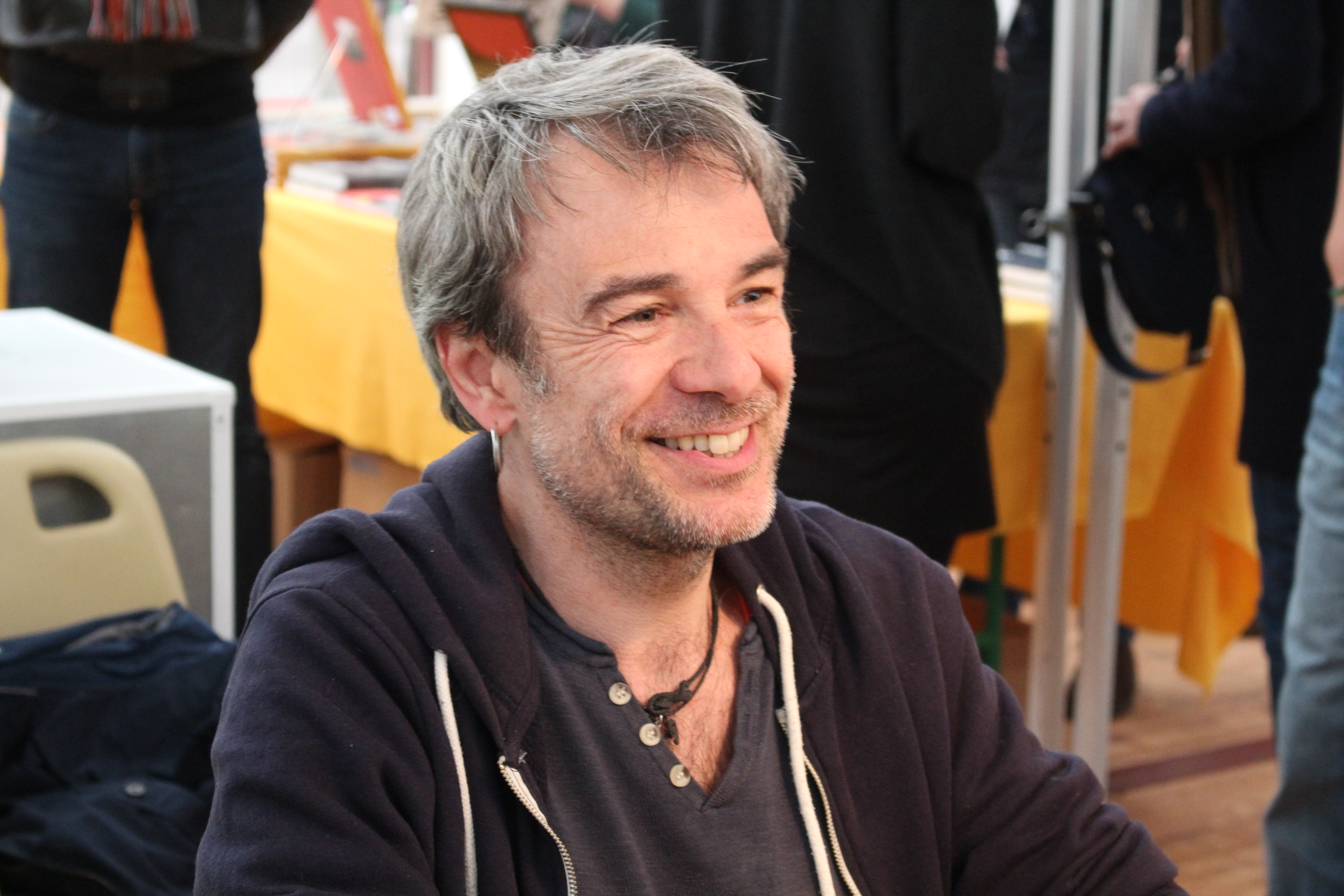
- Fabcaro at the Metz Book Festival in 2016
- Born: Fabrice Caro; 10 August 1973 (age 53) Montpellier, France

Fabrice Caro (born 10 August 1973), commonly known by his pen name Fabcaro, is a French novelist, comic book writer, and musician.

== Biography ==
Caro was born in Montpellier in 1973, the son of a cook and a cashier. After originally being educated as a physicist, he switched to teaching by enrolling in an IUFM, but then became a cartoonist and comic book writer in 1996, working for a variety of comics magazines. He participated in the work of several writing collectives, such as 6 Pieds sous terre and La Cafetière, and wrote, among others, the novel Figurec and the comic strip Zaï Zaï Zaï Zaï. He became well known for his absurdist humor.

On 20 December 2022, it was announced that he would take over as the writer of the popular Asterix comic books from Jean-Yves Ferri, his first album being Asterix and the White Iris, released on 26 October 2023. His second album, Asterix in Lusitania, was released on 23 October 2025.

In addition to his comic book career, Fabcaro is also a musician. In 1994, he founded the rock group Hari Om and released two solo albums, Les Amants de la rue Sinistrose (1999) and Shhherpa (2014).
