= Vendetta knife =

A vendetta knife (Corsican: vendetta corse) is a type of dagger associated with the vendetta, the traditional feuds of Corsica.
