= Asterix in Switzerland =

16th comic book in the Asterix series

Asterix in Switzerland (Astérix chez les Helvètes)
- Date: 1973
- Series: Asterix

Creative team
- Writers: Rene Goscinny
- Artists: Albert Uderzo

Original publication
- Date of publication: 1970
- Language: French

Chronology
- Preceded by: Asterix and the Roman Agent
- Followed by: The Mansions of the Gods

Asterix in Switzerland (French: Astérix chez les Helvètes, "Asterix in the land of the Helvetii") is the sixteenth volume of the Asterix comic book series, by René Goscinny (stories) and Albert Uderzo (illustrations). It was originally serialized in Pilote magazine issues 557–578 in 1970 and translated into English in 1973.

== Plot summary ==
Condatum's Roman governor Varius Flavus has been embezzling a majority of the local taxes in order to finance a debauched lifestyle of never-ending parties, sending only a pittance to Rome, until Quaestor Vexatius Sinusitus is sent to investigate. Flavus, upon finding the Quaestor will not be easy to corrupt, serves him poisoned food and provides inept doctors making absurd guesses at his ailment.

Realizing his life is in danger, Sinusitus sends for the druid Getafix, who instantly identifies the malady as attempted murder by poison. Getafix agrees to brew an antidote for Sinusitus but lacks an essential ingredient: a flower called the "silver star" (edelweiss), and sends Asterix and Obelix to Helvetia (Switzerland) to find it. He also insists that Sinusitus remain in the Gaulish village as a hostage – ostensibly to guarantee Asterix and Obelix's return, but secretly to protect Sinusitus from Flavus.

Asterix and Obelix reach Helvetia but soon run into difficulties set by the Romans, as Varius Flavus has warned his colleague in Helvetia, the equally-corrupt Curius Odus, of their arrival. Thus the Gauls find themselves continually chased and delayed by the Romans, but are assisted by the hotel manager Petitsuix, bank manager Zurix, and some Helvetian veterans who hold a celebration at Lake Geneva. During the celebration, Obelix is rendered senseless by plum wine, and the veterans are attacked by the Roman army; whereupon Asterix and some of the Helvetians, tying themselves to Obelix and each other, obtain the "silver star" from the mountainside, while the remaining Helvetians repel the Romans.

Later Varius Flavus comes to the village, expecting Sinusitus to be near death, either from the poison or execution by the Gauls after Asterix and Obelix have failed to return. Instead, the now-healthy Sinusitus marches out of Getafix's house, and empowered by the druid's magic potion, punches Flavus into the sky, announcing that he will now expose the corruption and sentence Flavus and Odus to their fate in the Circus in Rome. Vitalstatistix declares Sinusitus to have been the village's guest rather than its hostage, and the story ends with the usual banquet for the villagers, and Sinusitus is invited to it, making it the first banquet featuring a Roman as a guest.

== Commentary ==
- Following the protests of May 1968, Goscinny started introducing more "adult" themes such as the opening "orgy" scene which parodies Federico Fellini's debauched Roman film, Fellini Satyricon. The painted faces, feeling of ennui, mechanical gorging of elaborate food, and sado-masochistic punishments are balanced (in Helvetia) by the fastidiousness of the Swiss servants who keep cleaning up messes, washing whips, etc.
- The idea to send Asterix and Obelix to Switzerland was proposed by future French president Georges Pompidou. A handwritten note from Pompidou, when he was prime minister, urging the authors to write about Asterix among the Helvetians, was displayed in an Asterix exhibition at the National Library of France in 2013.
- This album features a rare dark overtone in that the plot involves a victim of attempted murder. The added element of potential death offers a startling but refreshing moment of drama in the otherwise whimsical series. Other stories that share a dramatic turn include Asterix and Son (where the village is destroyed) and Asterix and the Magic Carpet (in which a princess is threatened with being sacrificed).
- The comic contains several puns on typical Swiss features, such as the confidentiality and high level of security of Swiss banks, fondue, Swiss clocks (especially cuckoo clocks), the Helvetians' insistence on neutrality, yodeling, punctuality, alphorns (as an alternative form of carnyx), and – in one notable scene – the Swiss Federal Assembly.
- The comic suggests that modern mountain climbing was introduced when Asterix has the idea of him, Obelix and their Helvetian aides securing themselves with ropes, and sledding when Asterix accidentally rides Obelix down the mountainside.
- One scene with Asterix shooting a bow while a boy with an apple on his head fixes a target is a nod to the Swiss folk hero William Tell.
- In one panel, avalanches in the Alps are satirized when the Roman legionaire hanging on to Obelix cautions, "Stop shouting, you could easily start something off."
- Like always, this issue concludes with the celebrational village feast with Cacophonix being tied to the tree. However in this case he is not gagged. Nothing prevents his awful singing during the affair.

=== Changes in adaptation ===
- Bibendum (the Michelin logo) makes a brief guest appearance as the chariot wheel dealer in the original English translation; whereas the original French version used the Gaulish-warrior-like mascot of the French service station company Antar. The 2004 English re-print from Orion Books uses the French illustrations, thus rendering Obelix's joke about Bibendum's weight in the next panel nonsensical. ("Call me fat! Did you see his spare tyre?") (Different images of the wheel dealer.)

== In other languages ==
- Catalan: Astèrix al país dels helvecis
- Croatian: Asteriks kod Helvećana
- Czech: Asterix v Helvetii
- Danish: Asterix i Alperne
- Dutch: Asterix en de Helvetiërs
- Finnish: Asterix ja alppikukka ("Asterix and the Flower of the Alps")
- Galician: Astérix na Helvecia
- German: Asterix bei den Schweizern
- Greek: Ο Αστερίξ στους Ελβετούς, romanized: O Asteríx stous Elvetoús
- Icelandic: Ástríkur í Heilvitalandi
- Italian: Asterix e gli Elvezi
- Latin: Asterix apud Helvetios
- Norwegian: Asterix i Alpene ("Asterix in the Alps")
- Polish: Asteriks u Helwetów
- Portuguese: Astérix entre os Helvécios
- Serbian: Астерикс у Хелвецији, romanized: Asteriks u Helveciji
- Spanish: Astérix en Helvecia
- Swedish: Asterix i Alperna
- Turkish: Asteriks İsviçre'de

== See also ==
- Switzerland in the Roman era
